= Pigge =

- Frazione
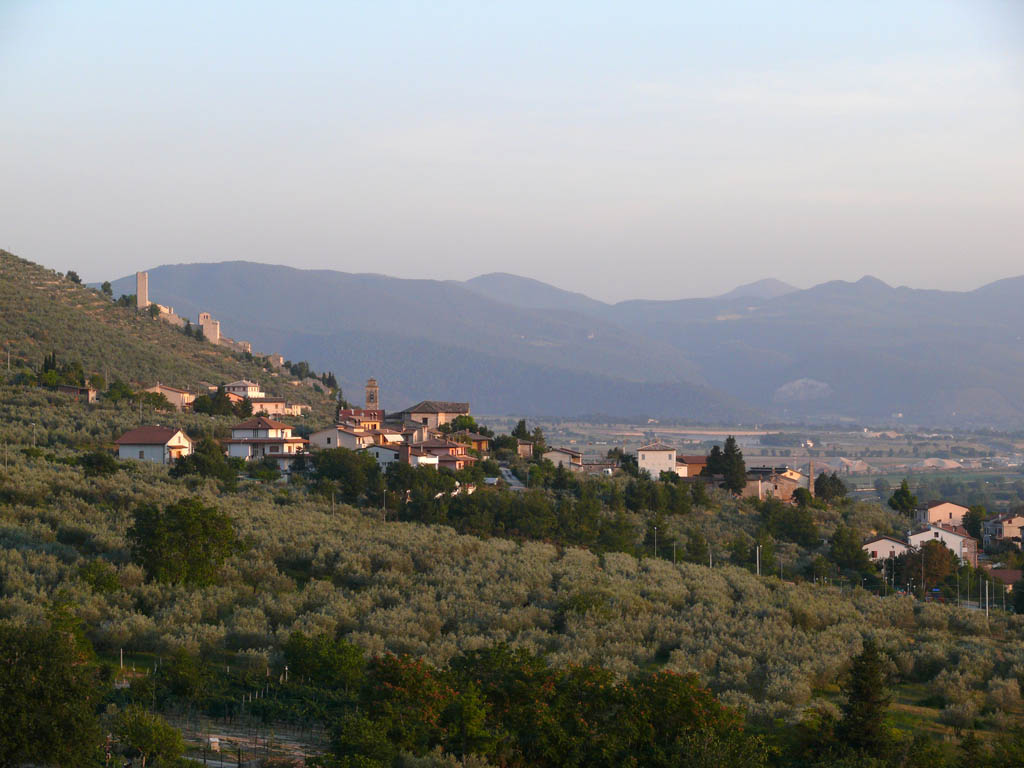
- Pigge

- Location of Pigge in Italy
- Coordinates: 42°51′N 12°45′E
- Country: Italy
- Region: Umbria
- Province: Perugia
- Comune: Trevi
- Elevation: 297 m (974 ft)

Population (2001)
  - Total: 463
- Time zone: UTC+1 (CET)
  - Summer (DST): UTC+2 (CEST)
- Dialing code: 0742

Pigge or Lapigge is a village in the Italian province of Perugia in east central Umbria, stretching from the plain of the Clitunno river up the lower SW flank of Mt. Serano, at 297 m above sea-level. It is a frazione of the comune of Trevi, which is 3 km NNW. Its population was 463 in 2003.

== History and main sights ==
Until at least the middle of the 20th century, the town's name was regularly Lapigge, still the technically correct form but rapidly falling out by apocope of a perceived article la ("the"). The origin of the toponym is in fact *Lapidie, from a stone bridge (Latin: pons lapideus) which in Roman times carried the Via Flaminia over the Clitumnus river.

Lapigge's oldest church is that of the former convent of S. Arcangelo, already mentioned in 1177 as a dependency of San Pietro in Bovara, but suspected by scholars to be considerably older, probably of the Lombard period. It has been much reworked over the centuries; over the main altar a fresco of the Umbrian school can be seen, depicting the Madonna and Child, attributed to Bartolomeo da Miranda. In 1646, an apparition of the Virgin Mary launched the church as a Marian sanctuary; the elegant Baroque belfry and the adjacent cloister date from the 17th century.

The church of S. Bernardino is a small single-apsed building in the Romanesque style, much reworked in the 17th and 18th centuries, with remains of a fresco of the Adoration of the Magi dated 1575.

The single-room hexagonal church of S. Maria del Ponte in the lower part of town, though in its present form dating to the 16th century and reworked in the 18th, replaces a medieval church; a medieval church of S. Bartolomeo has also disappeared.

== Transportation ==
The main highway bypasses the village.

The nearest train station is at Trevi, Umbria.
