= Castel San Giovanni, Castel Ritaldi =

Castel San Giovanni
- Frazione
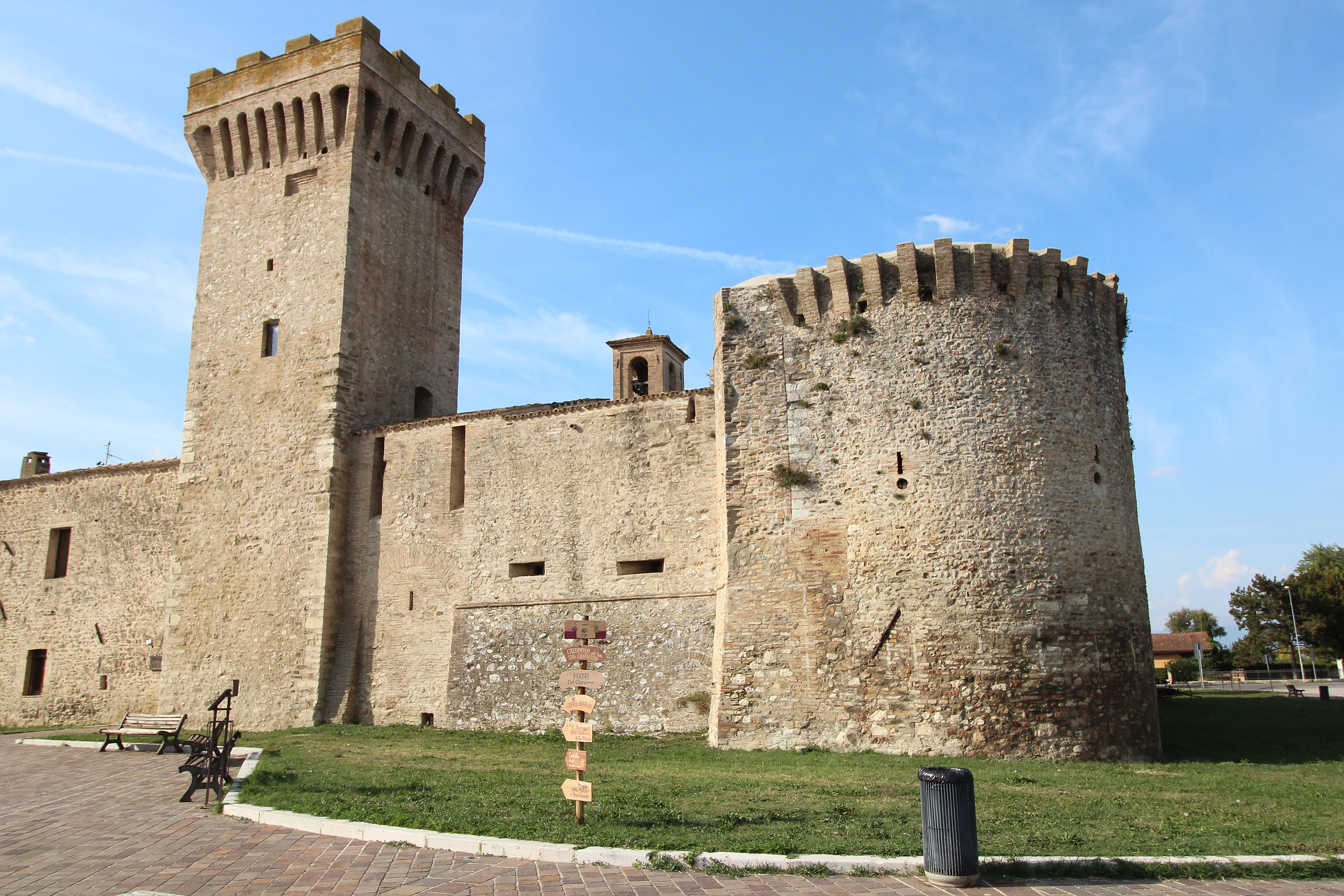
- Castel San Giovanni Tower.

- Location within Italy
- Coordinates: 42°50′14″N 12°42′24″E
- Country: Italy
- Region: Umbria
- Province: Perugia
- Comune: Castel Ritaldi
- Elevation: 225 m (738 ft)

Population (2021)
  - Total: 304
- Time zone: UTC+1 (CET)
  - Summer (DST): UTC+2 (CEST)
- Postcode: 06044
- Area code: 0743

Castel San Giovanni is a frazione of the comune of Castel Ritaldi in the Province of Perugia, Umbria, central Italy. It stands at an elevation of 225 metres (738 ft) above sea level. In 2021, it had a population of 304 residents.

Castel San Giovanni lies in the central part of the Umbrian Valley.

== History ==
Castel San Giovanni originated as a small castle built at the initiative of Cardinal Gil de Albornoz. It was at first dependent on the communities of Trevi and Spoleto. Later, it became an autonomous comune.

In 1875, it was incorporated into the municipality of Castel Ritaldi.
