= Santa Maria Assunta, Cerqueto =

Church building in Cerqueto, Italy

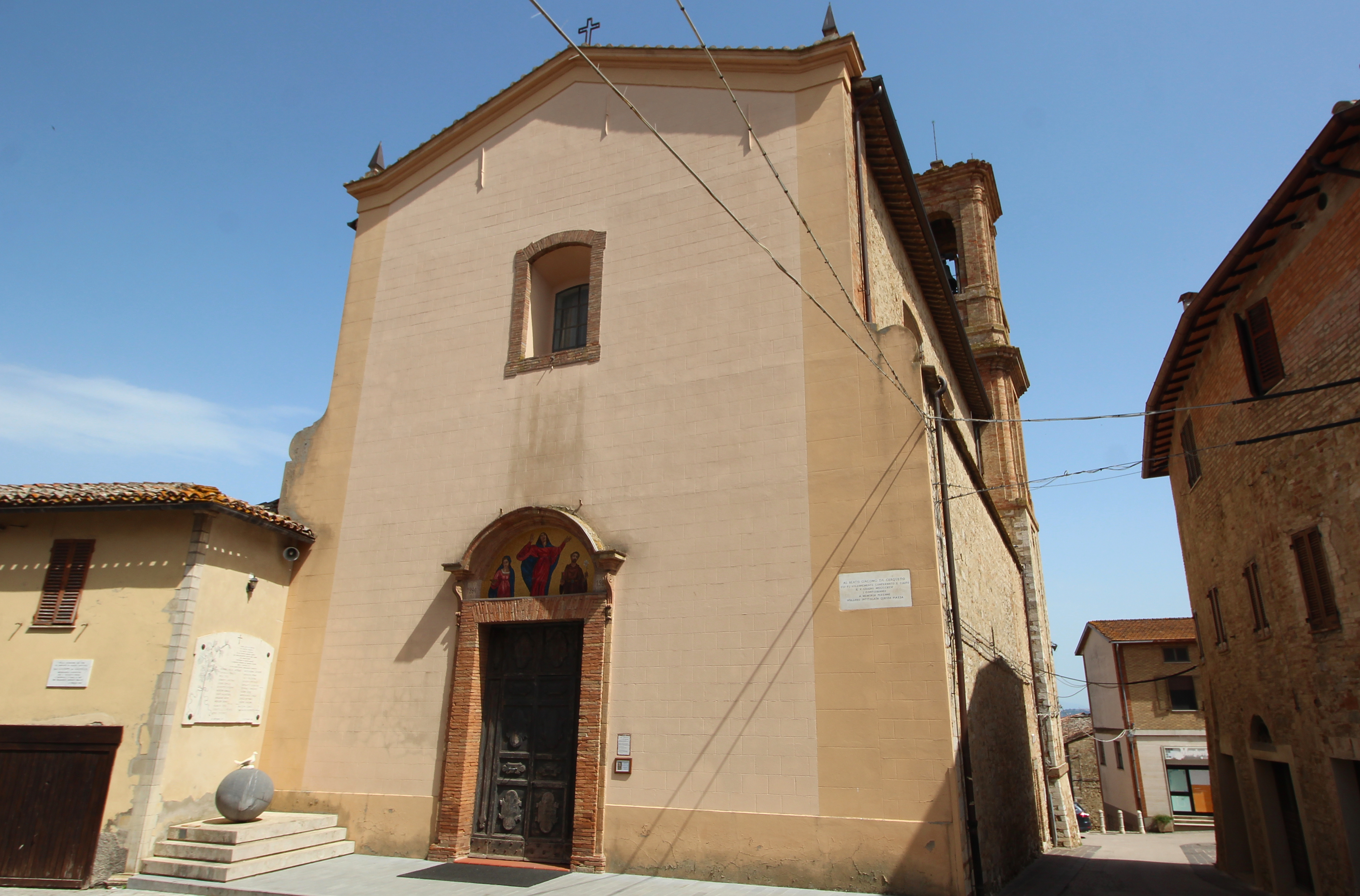
Santa Maria Assunta

Santa Maria Assunta is a Roman Catholic church located in the Piazza Beato Giacomo in Cerqueto, neighborhood of the town of Marsciano, Province of Perugia, region of Umbria, Italy.

A church was located at the site since 1163, and ins mentioned in documents of emperor Frederick Barbarossa. The interior contains a fresco depicting St Sebastian (1478) one of the earliest work of Pietro Vannucci. Fragments of a St Roch and St Peter remain. The church also has a 15th-century Crucifixion frescoed by Tiberio di Diotallevi of Assisi.
