= Manciano (disambiguation) =

Manciano may refer to several places in Italy:

- Manciano, a comune in the Province of Grosseto, Tuscany
- Manciano (Trevi), a frazione of Trevi in the Province of Perugia, Umbria
- Manciano, a locality of Morlupo in the Province of Rome, Lazio
- Manciano La Misericordia, a frazione of Castiglion Fiorentino in the Province of Arezzo, Tuscany
