= Bernardino Gagliardi =

Italian painter

Bernardino Gagliardi (1609–1660) was an Italian Baroque painter, generally producing frescos for churches. He joined the Academy of St Luke, becoming its president in 1655.

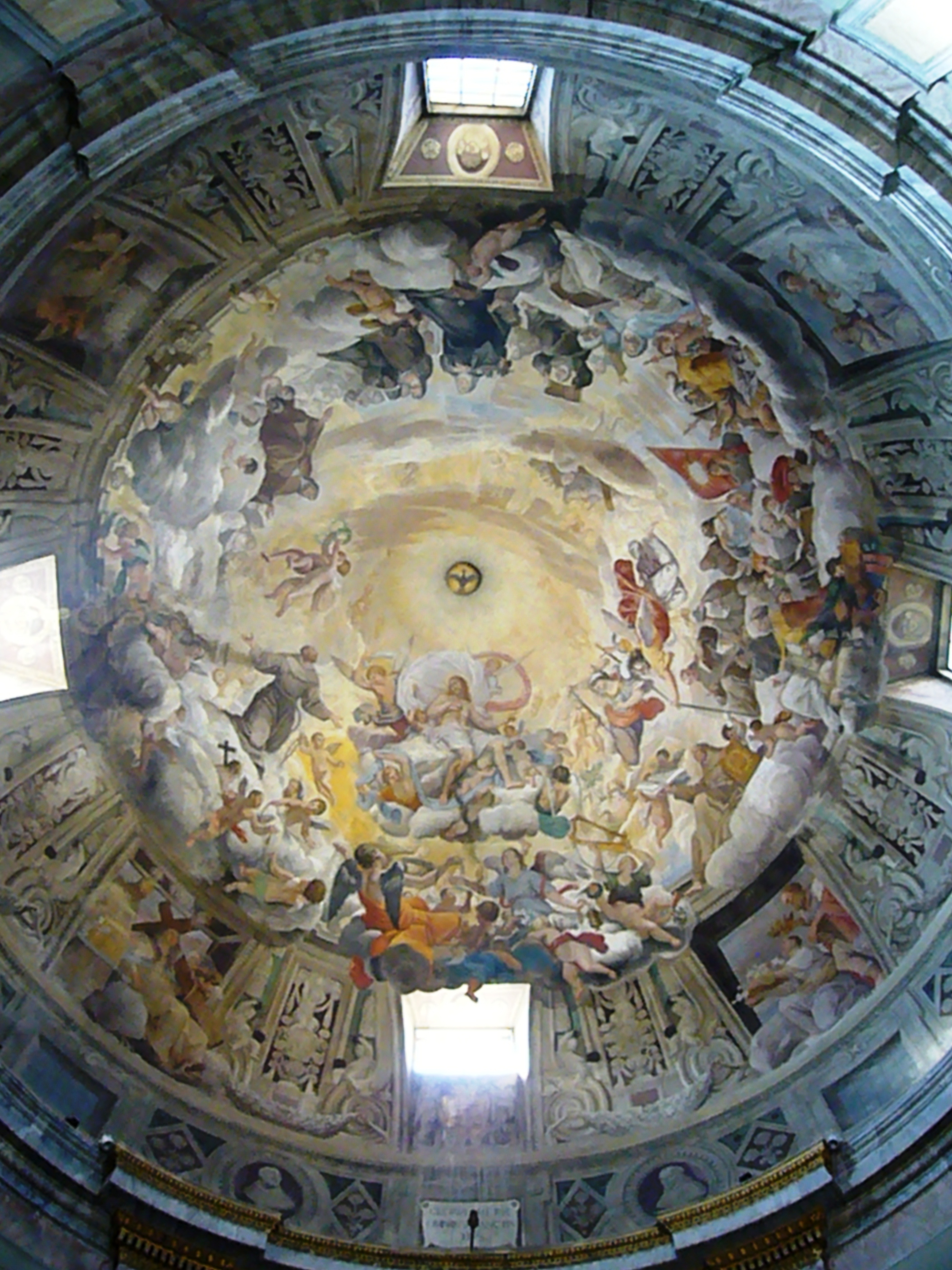
Cupola in San Bernardino ai Monti, Rome

== Biography ==
He was born in Città di Castello and initially trained with a painter and architect named Rinaldo Rinaldi in Castello. He moved to Rome to join the studio of Avanzino Nucci who was also from Città di Castello. In Rome, he painted for the churches of San Bernardino ai Monti and San Sebastiano al Palatino. Pope Urban VII knighted him with a Cross of the Order of San Maurizio. Gagliardi joined the Academy of St Luke and became its president in 1655.

In Rome, he painted the altarpiece San Pellegrino in the church of San Marcello al Corso. He also painted in the cloister of San Francesco in Trevi, Umbria. Also called Bernardo Gagliardi. He appears to be different from, and sometimes confused with, his contemporary, Filippo Gagliardi. He was instructed by Horatio Ferretti of Perugia.

He returned to Città di Castello, where he painted for the Cathedral and for the Church of San Giovanni Decollato. For the local seminary, he painted a Deposition. For the Church of Saint Mary of Combarbio, Anghiari, near Arezzo, he painted a fresco of the Assumption. This Assumption inspired Marco Benefial in his fresco for the Cathedral presbytery. Gagliardi died in Perugia in 1660.
