= Trevi, Umbria =

Trevi
- Comune
- Comune di Trevi
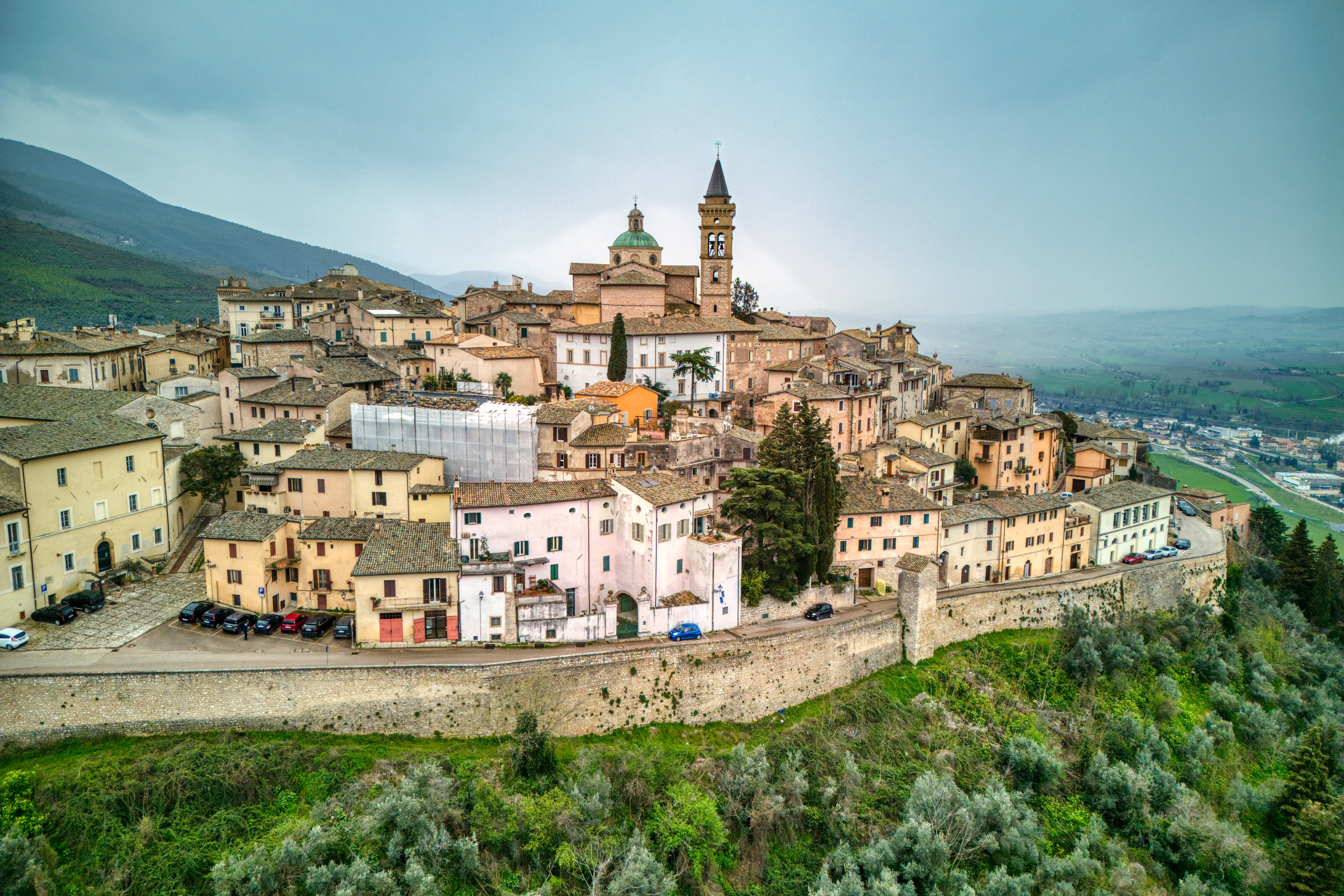
- View of Trevi

- Coat of arms

- Location within Italy Location within Umbria
- Coordinates: 42.877453°N 12.747751°E
- Country: Italy
- Region: Umbria
- Province: Perugia (PG)

Government
  - Mayor: Ferdinando Gemma

Area
  - Total: 71.2 km^{2} (27.5 sq mi)
- Elevation: 412 m (1,352 ft)

Population (1 January 2025)
  - Total: 7,927
  - Density: 111/km^{2} (288/sq mi)
- Demonym: Trevani
- Time zone: UTC+1 (CET)
  - Summer (DST): UTC+2 (CEST)
- Postal code: 06039 (hillside) and 06032 (valley)
- Dialing code: 0742
- Patron saint: St. Emilian
- Saint day: January 28
- Website: Official website

Trevi (Italian: [ˈtrɛːvi]; Latin: Trebiae) is an ancient town and comune (municipality) in Umbria, Italy, on the lower flank of Mount Serano overlooking the wide plain of the Clitunno river system.

Located in the Province of Perugia, it is 10 km (6 mi) south-southeast of Foligno and 20 km (12 mi) north of Spoleto. It is one of I Borghi più belli d'Italia ("The most beautiful villages of Italy").

Most of the town, densely inhabited and of decidedly medieval aspect, lies on sharply sloping terrain, only the very center being more or less flat. It commands one of the best views in Umbria, extending over 50 km (30 mi) in most westerly directions. Trevi is served by the Rome–Ancona railway as well as the Florence–Rome railway via Perugia.

Trevi is a member of Cittaslow.

== History ==
=== Antiquity ===
Historians traditionally place the foundation of Trevi in the mid-4th century BC. Trebia or Treba was an Umbrian city situated on the western slopes of the Apennines, between Fulginium and the sources of the Clitunno. Originally it lay in the plain on the banks of that river, as recalled by the phrase "Clitumnus fluvius qui Trevis civitatem Flaminiae interluit" in the Vatican gloss on Juvenal.

Whatever its earliest origin, whether Celtic or Etruscan, Trevi in antiquity was only a castle or fortress, and this memory survived in the place name Piazza della Rocca.

In the late 2nd century BC the town was taken by Rome. Pliny listed it among the municipalities of Umbria, and inscriptions mention the Trebiates. In the Itinerarium Hierosolymitanum it appears as Trevis, from which the present name developed.

After the end of Roman rule it passed under the Goths and later under the Lombards, as part of the Duchy of Spoleto.

Trevi became an episcopal see in the 3rd century and remained so, according to the chronicle of Gualdo, until the 9th century, or according to some writers until the 11th century.

=== Middle Ages and Early Modern era ===
In the Middle Ages it was included in the duchy of Spoleto and with it passed, together with other neighboring cities, under the dominion of the Church.

Innocent III united Trevi to Foligno, and it remained with that city while Foligno was Guelph; it again returned under Foligno during the rule of Ugolino II Trinci, vicar of the Church and lord of Foligno.

The municipality of Trevi emerged in 1213. Trevi suffered from siding now with the Guelphs and now with the Ghibellines. In 1310 the Perugians rode to Trevi, forcibly restored the Guelphs there, and expelled the opposing faction.

It was later ruled by Biordo Michelotti, then occupied by Niccolò Piccinino, and afterwards by Francesco Sforza. After the fall of Trinci power in 1439, it was subjected to other lords and later, having passed to the Church, was governed by the cardinal legates of Umbria. The city had a Mount of Piety established in 1469.

In 1513 the town was threatened with serious danger because of the hostility of Spoleto, whose forces came to besiege it with an army of 7,000 combatants, but, through the intervention of Perugia and Foligno, they abandoned the undertaking.

From the mid-15th century to the end of the 18th century it was governed within the framework headed by the governor-general of the province of Perugia and Umbria. Trevi was granted the title of city in 1784, under Pius VI.

=== Contemporary period ===
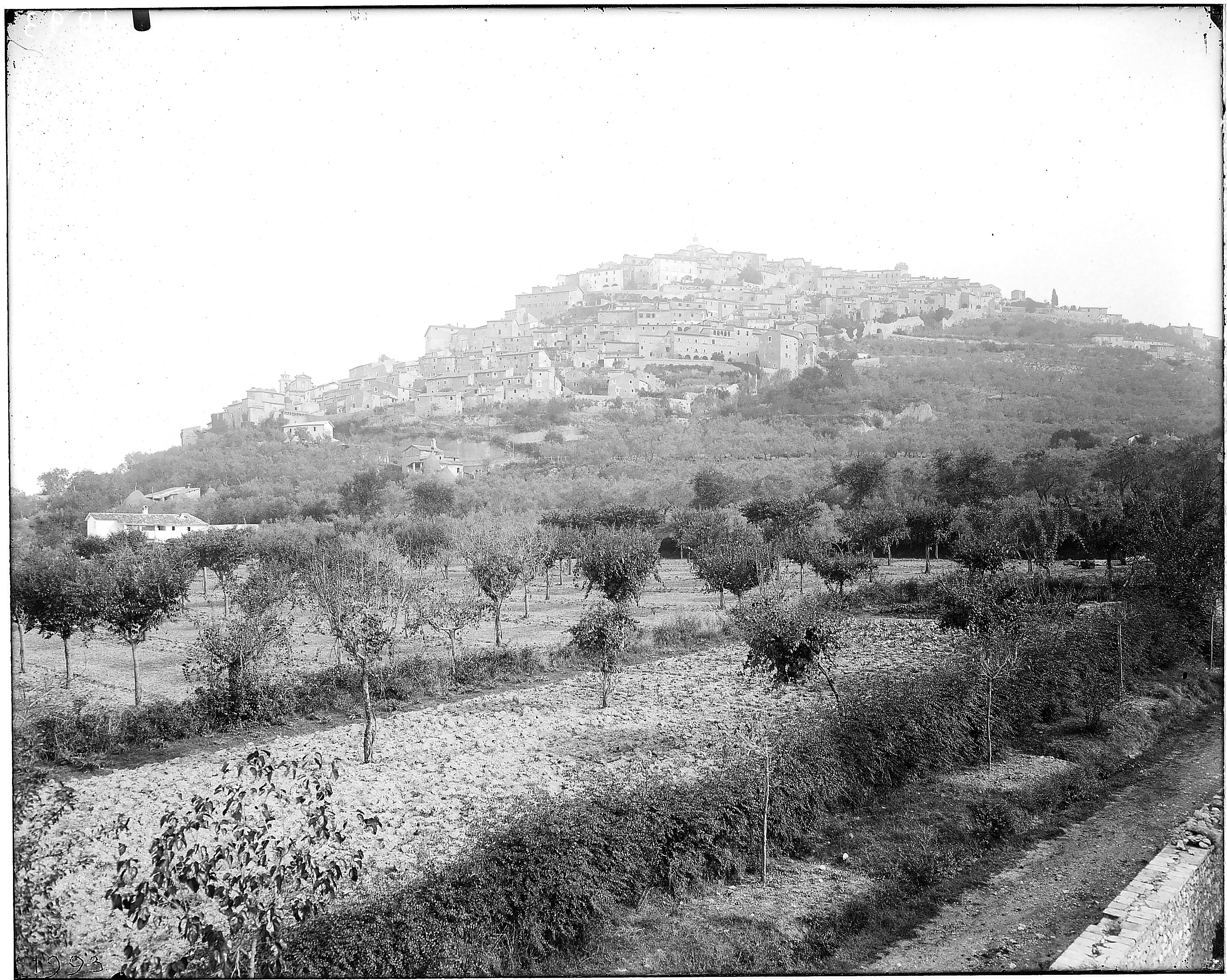
Trevi and surroundings, 1906

Between 1798 and 1799 Trevi came under the Roman Republic. From 1799 to 1809 papal rule was restored, before the town became part of the French Empire from 1809 to 1814. In 1814, after the French withdrew, Trevi returned to Church jurisdiction.

On 6 July 1816, by a motu proprio of Pope Pius VII, Trevi was classified as a community hosting a governor and placed within the Delegation of Spoleto. In 1817 it remained the seat of a governor, and Campello, Cerreto, Montesanto, and Sellano were placed under it.

In September 1860 Piedmontese troops captured the principal cities of the region. On 4–5 November 1860 Umbria voted in a referendum on annexation to the Kingdom of Italy, and on 17 December 1860 Trevi was annexed.

Trevi had 5,337 inhabitants in 1895.

== Geography ==
Trevi stands at 400 metres (1,300 ft) above sea level, between Foligno and Spoleto, on the summit of a hill entirely covered with olive trees. In the surrounding territory, the land is described as highly fertile. The hillside is covered with olive groves, while in the plain vegetables are cultivated.

The city stands on the summit and southern slope of a steep hill branching from Monte Petino and joining to the east with the Apennine range, overlooking the Umbrian Valley. It lies a short distance from the Via Flaminia, with Foligno 6 miles (9.7 km) to the north and Spoleto 12 miles (19 km) to the east.

In the mid-19th century, woodland reportedly consisted only of coppice groves.

The territory extends over 71 square kilometres (27 sq mi) from the valley (210 m) to Mts. Brunette (1422 m) and Serano (1429 m) and can be divided into three more or less equal zones: plain, hills, and mountain; each with its own characteristic vegetation. In the plain, the very fertile land is well irrigated by many watercourses, heirs for the most part to the Lacus Clitorius of Antiquity, and is suited to annual crops. The hills, of a very loose alkaline limestone with excellent drainage, are an ideal terrain for the intensive and highly specialized cultivation of olive trees that produce a very characteristic and highly prized oil. Finally, the mountains are covered in meadows and forests, primarily deciduous.

The natural environment of the territory as a whole remains largely unspoiled, this despite being significantly populated for millennia. The mountainous area is now witnessing a considerable depopulation — as elsewhere in Italy, in the second half of the 20th century settlements at the highest elevations have been rapidly losing their inhabitants to the plains. The most important growth areas since the period following World War II have been Borgo Trevi (commercial, residential, and offices), Pietrarossa (industrial), and Matigge (light and medium industry, commercial).

Many rivers and canals, none of them very large, run in a general south-to-north direction, converging into a single river near Bevagna. Their courses are by now highly artificial, the result of land and water management projects undertaken over many centuries, since they are recorded at least as early as the time of Theodoric the Great (6th century) and have continued down to our own time with the construction of dams and works to regularize the seasonal waters of the Marroggia that had been subject to frequent torrential overflows with sudden and disastrous results.

The most important of the year-round watercourses is the Clitunno River, celebrated in antiquity as the Clitumnus, whose deified waters were reputed to have miraculous properties and which have been lauded in prose and verse by Pliny the Younger, Propertius, Claudian, Addison, Byron and Carducci.

Trevi borders the following municipalities: Campello sul Clitunno, Castel Ritaldi, Foligno, Montefalco, Sellano, Spoleto.

=== Subdivisions ===
The municipality includes the localities of Cannaiola, Casco dell'Acqua, Corciano-Pigge, Coste, Coste San Paolo, Il Colle, La Valle, Le Corone, Manciano, Marroggia, Picciche, San Donato, San Lorenzo, San Pietro a Pettine, Santa Maria in Valle, Trevi.

In 2021, 804 people lived in rural dispersed dwellings not assigned to any named locality.

At the time, the most populous locality was Trevi proper (4,702). The historical subdivisions of Trevi proper are the terzieri of Castello, Matiggia e Piano; they come into play only for the Palio.

== Economy ==
The mainstays of Trevi's economy are olive oil and tourism.

The surrounding territory is described as fertile and productive, with olive cultivation being especially extensive. In the 19th century olive growing was so extensive that for several months it provided work to important oil mills and sustained a specialized export trade in prized olive oil. In the plain, irrigated vegetable cultivation also formed a significant part of local agricultural production.

Trevi is known for its long-standing olive oil production. The surrounding landscape includes olive groves, vineyards producing Trebbiano, and cultivated fields such as those used for the production of black celery. The Sentiero degli Ulivi connects Spoleto and Assisi and passes through the territory of Trevi at elevations of about 500 metres (1,600 ft) to 600 metres (2,000 ft), with scattered rural houses dating to the 16th century associated with olive cultivation.

The territory is known for the quality of its oil, a result of near-ideal calcareous soil with excellent drainage, just the right altitude for the cultivation of olive trees, and favourable climatic conditions on the west-facing lower slopes of the Apennine mountain range.

Trevi's good train and highway access has made the town the most convenient base for visiting central Umbria for those who rely on public transportation; the unusual number of good restaurants in the municipality is partly the cause, partly the result of increased tourism.

== Religion ==
=== Sant'Emiliano ===
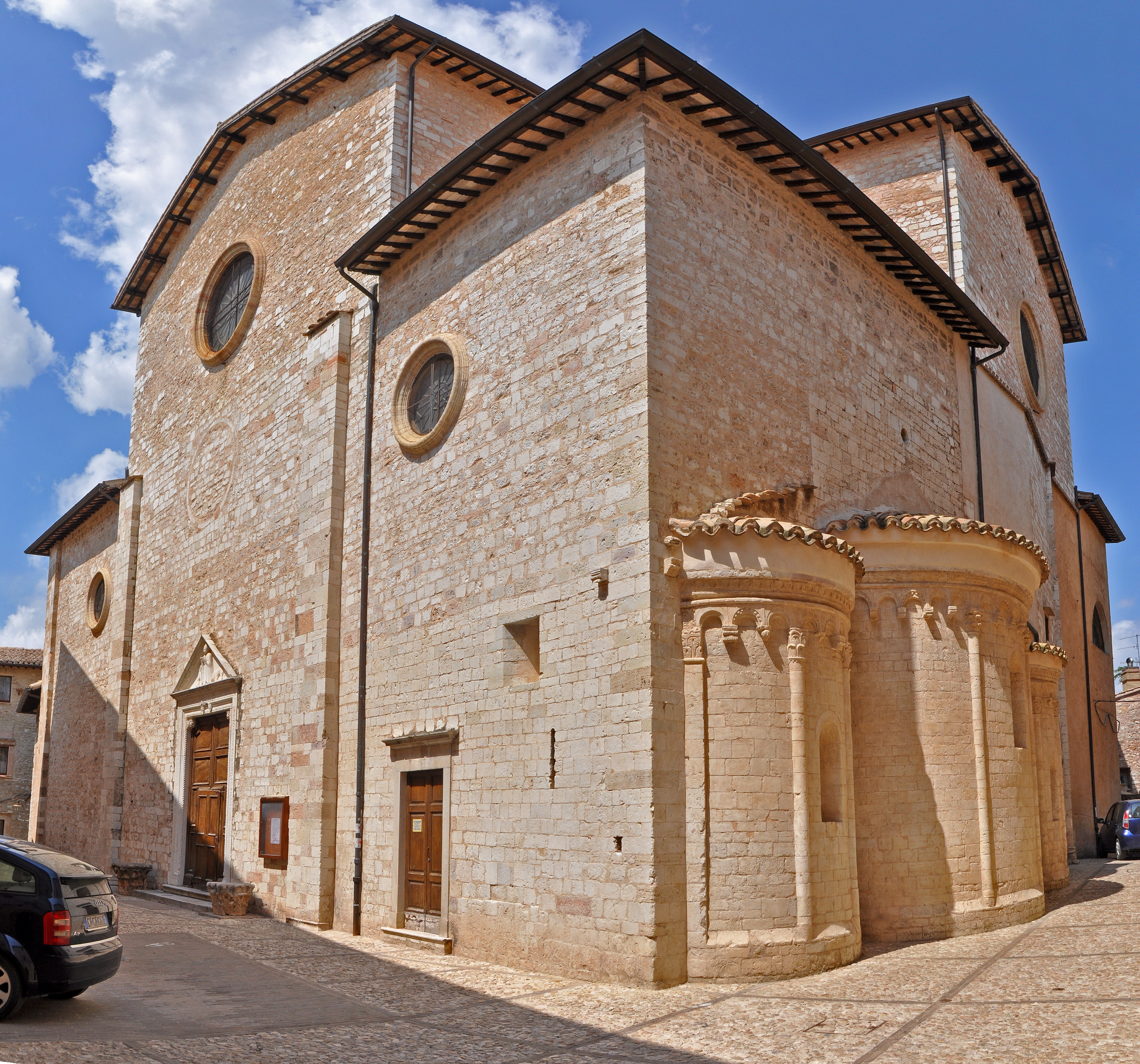
Rounded apses of the church of Sant'Emiliano

The church of Sant'Emiliano preserves on the exterior wall to the east the remains of a chapel decorated with three apses, a construction of the 11th century. The principal entrance has a rectangular form and ends in a pediment with the statue of Sant'Emiliano in the center and two lions at the sides caressing him.

The interior, in the left nave, contains three altars included within a single architectural composition in white stone from the Apennines. In the niches are the statues of Mary with Jesus in her arms and Saint Joseph. The central altar has a richer altar with fine carving, above which rise two pilasters whose cornices correspond to the columns of the lateral altars. The central part is crowned by an ornament bearing in low relief the figure of God blessing. This work was executed by maestro Rocco da Vicenza.

The baptismal font is a stone work from the beginning of the 16th century. Above it stands the statue of Saint John. On the right side of the entrance wall is an oil painting representing the Madonna della Cintura, and in small panels in a recess of the wall are painted scenes from the life of Christ. The stucco decoration and the painting were executed by Orazio Alfani and his son Domenico in 1580. The church is furnished with an organ.

=== Madonna delle Lacrime ===
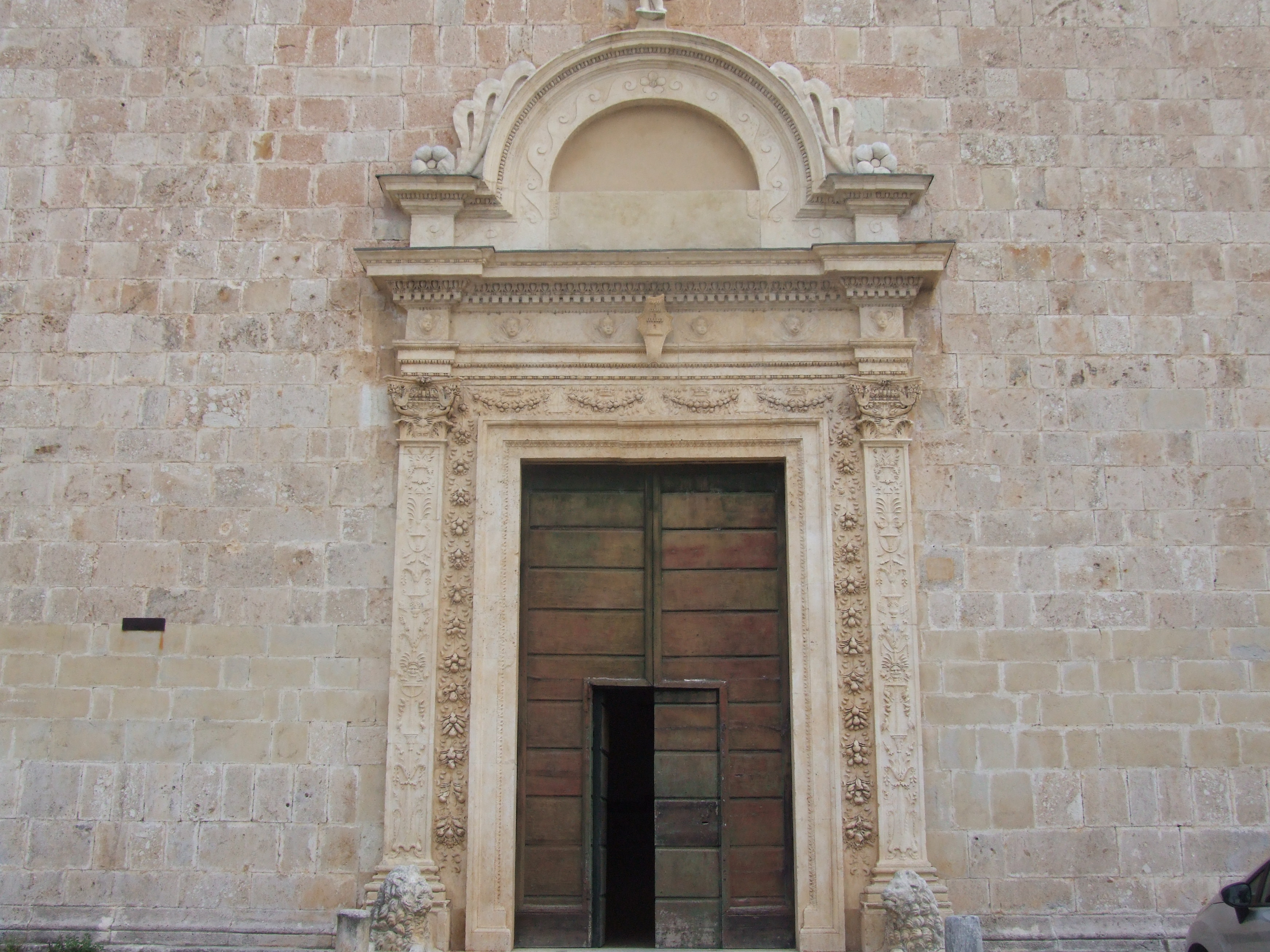
The Renaissance portal, with classical pilasters and ornate cornice by Giovanni di Gian Pietro

The sanctuary stands on the site of a rural house where, in 1483, an image of the Madonna with Child and Saint Francis had been painted for devotional purposes. On 5 August 1485 the image was said to have shed tears of blood, leading to the construction of the sanctuary, completed in 1522.

The church was built at the foot of Trevi, on the slope called San Costanzo, in 1487, from a design by maestro Antonio Fiorentino. The Olivetan monks of San Pietro di Bovara took possession of it on 1 March 1489, although the construction was not yet complete. Maestro Giovanni di Gian Pietro of Venice executed the entrance on the principal façade. He also made the cornice of the façade in 1511.

The interior has a Latin cross plan with a single nave and several chapels. Within the church are funerary monuments carved in pietra caciolfa belonging to members of the Valenti family. The same family commissioned the polychrome marble altar intended to house the image of the Madonna associated with the origin of the sanctuary.

On the entrance wall, to the left, is the fine monument of Benedetto Valenti with the apostrophus date CIↃIↃXLI (1541). In the unframed lateral spaces are frescoes in the manner of Zuccari. On the left wall, between the first and second recesses, is the monument to Subrezia Lucarini Valenti, with the bust of the deceased at the center, a work executed in 1564. Between the second recess and the pier of the crossing is the monument of Monte Valenti, who died in 1588.

The recess forming the left chapel contains notable frescoes executed by Lo Spagna on commission from the Canons Regular. They represent on the side walls Saint Ubald and Saint Joseph; in the arch above, two candelabra with decorated bands and in the center the emblem of the Holy Spirit; on the back wall, the transport of the body of the Redeemer; and above, in the semicircular section, Saint Augustine in episcopal vestments. At the sides of the lunette are seven figures of devotees, perhaps the patrons of the work, executed in 1520. The stoup is a 16th-century work.

In the right arm of the transept is the marble monument of Cardinal Erminio Valenti, who died in 1618. On the altar wall is a fresco of the Virgin with Jesus in her arms, a work of the 15th century, and this image gave rise to the construction of the church. On the right wall of the nave is the funerary monument to Filiberto Valenti, who died in 1624.

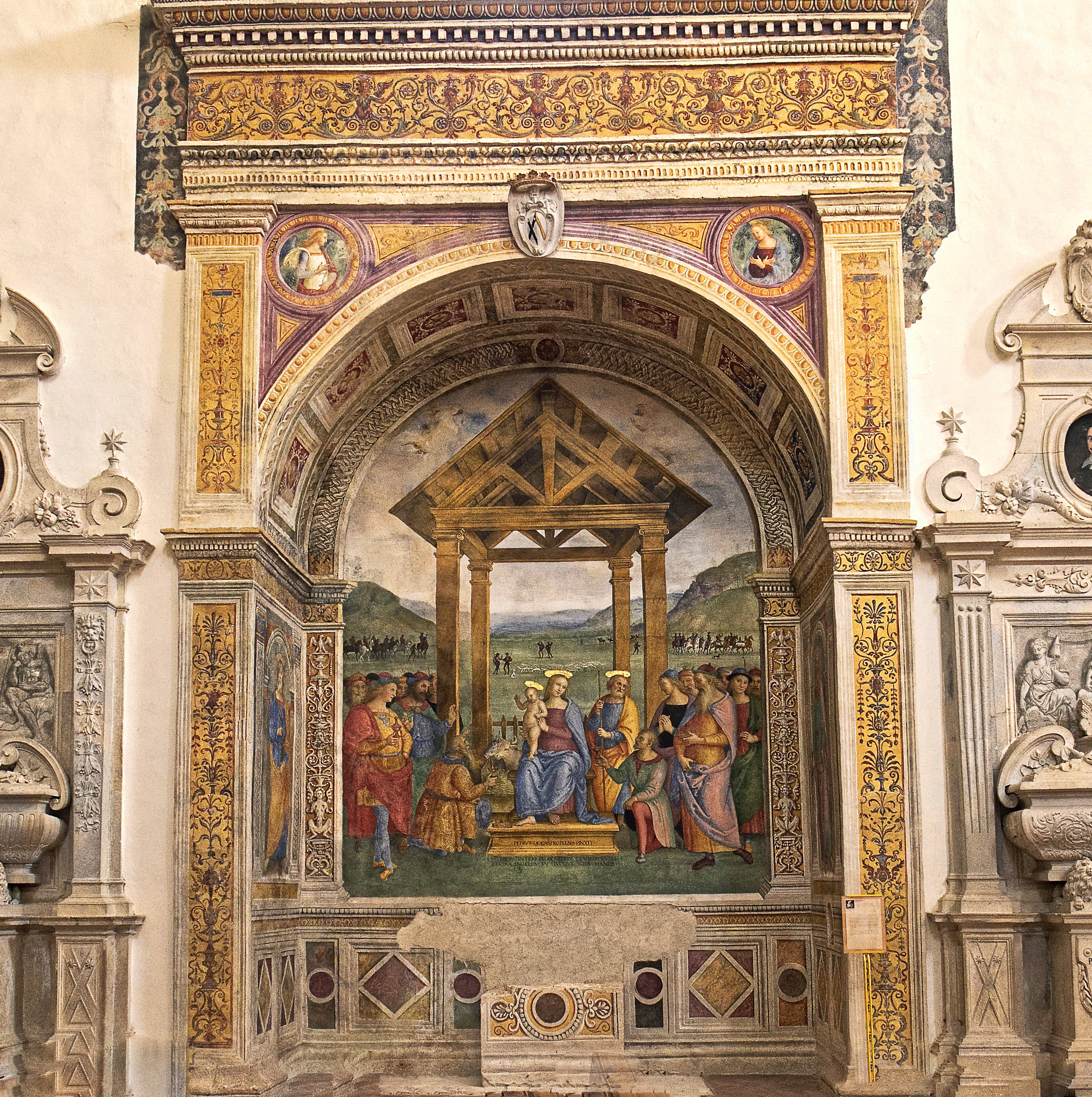
Fresco by Perugino in the sanctuary of Madonna delle Lacrime

The first recess and chapel contains frescoes by Perugino, executed in 1521. On the central wall is represented the Epiphany. A clear sky opens above a broad and delightful valley; the meadow leading to the hut is scattered with horsemen and shepherds, some intent on the flock, others listening to the announcement. Before the hut is the Virgin with Jesus in the act of blessing; on the left stands a kneeling king, while five other figures of his following advance, among them, in the central one, the portrait of the painter was recognized. Farther away the beasts of burden rest. On the right are Saint Joseph, the other two kings offering their gifts, and five pages. On the step of the Virgin’s throne is written: Petrus de Castro Plebis pinxit.

The second recess contains 16th-century frescoes representing the Baptist, Saint Anthony, Saint Roch, and four scenes from the life of the latter, and in the lunette the Annunciation of the Virgin.

In the sacristy is a small cinerary urn of gray alabastrine marble, with Roman reliefs and inscriptions, used as the basin for the lavabo water.

The church is managed by the Sisters of the Holy Family of Trevi.

=== Santa Maria di Pietrarossa ===
The church of Santa Maria di Pietrarossa lies to the north-west, 3 kilometres (1.9 mi) from Trevi. It was built on the remains of a large Umbro-Etruscan building, of which some carefully squared blocks of limestone from the Apennines remain, some of them 2 metres (6 ft 7 in) long. On three sides the church is surrounded by a portico supported by pilasters, with walls covered in frescoes.

Among these frescoes are Mary enthroned with Jesus; the Trinity with Mary and John at the sides; Saint Apollonia; Mary with Jesus; Mary seated and holding Jesus, who plays with a swallow; before them Saint Lucy, in a large fresco; the Crucifix, Mary, and Saint John, in a painting recalling the manner of Pierantonio da Foligno; Saint Michael; Saint Christopher in a gigantic figure; Mary with the Child turning toward a little bird held in the Virgin's hand; and on the step of the throne the inscription identifying the painter as Bartolomeo da Miranda and dating the work to 1438; Saint James, Saint Catherine, and various other saints.

The interior presents three small naves supported by pilasters. The walls, vaults, and apse are covered with frescoes by artists of the 15th century. The names of the artists read beneath the paintings are Valerio de Mutis, Bartolomeo de Miranda, and Bartolomeo di Tommaso. The high altar has a fine display with elegant ornament, the statues of Sant'Emiliano and the Baptist, and God the Father between two seraphim in low relief, an excellent work in stone from the Apennines attributable to Rocco da Vicenza.

=== Church and convent of San Martino ===
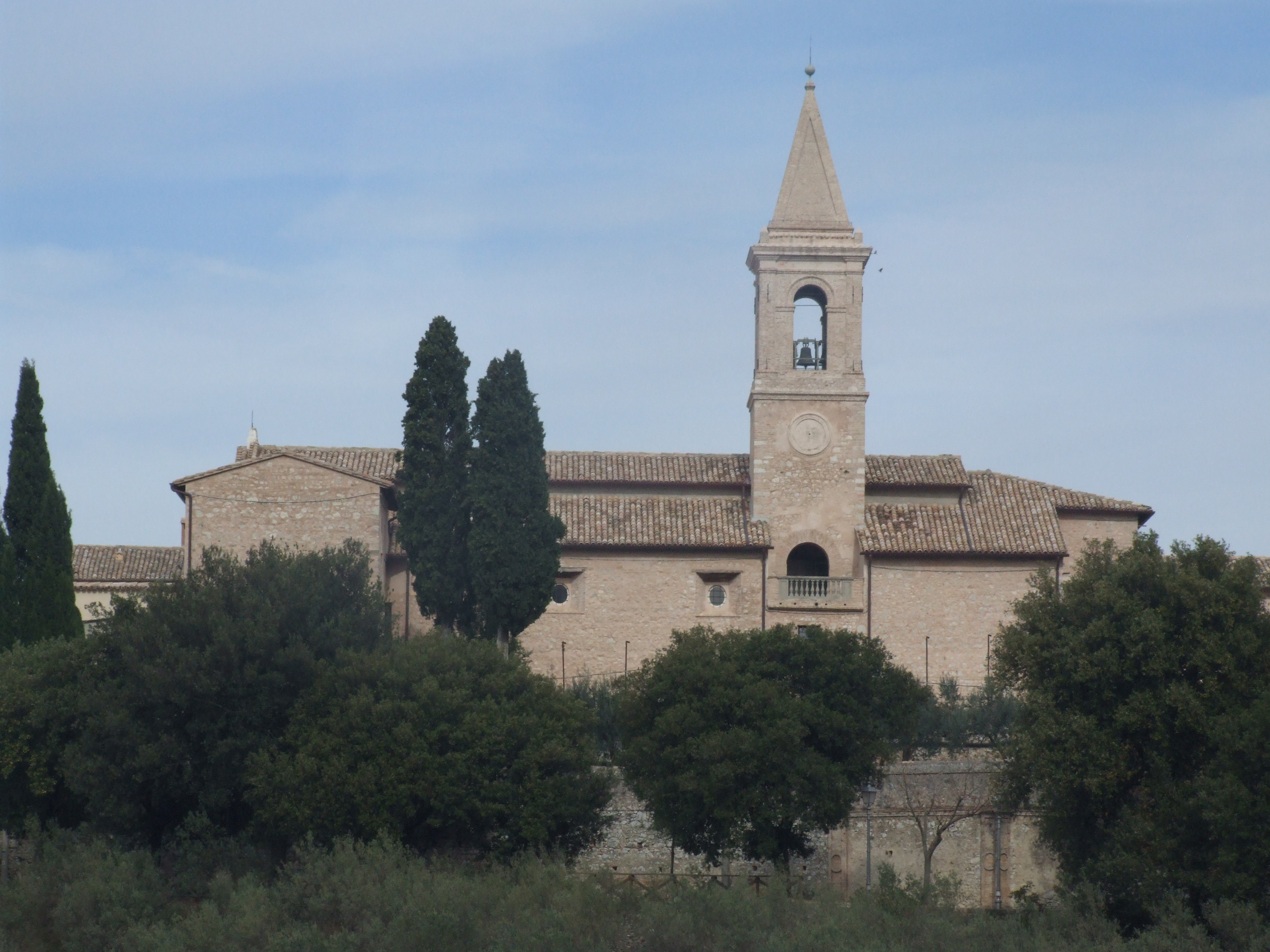
The complex and bell tower of the convent of San Martino, rising above dense cypress and olive growth

The church and convent of San Martino preserve on the altar wall of the outer chapel a large fresco within an architectural setting representing the Virgin on light clouds, surrounded by seraphim. Behind her shines a very limpid atmosphere, below bounded by a pleasant valley formed by hills and crossed by a watercourse, beyond which the city of Foligno appears. Before her kneel Saint Jerome, the Baptist, Saint Francis, and Brother Leo. The date is 1512. This painting is among the notable works of Lo Spagna.

On the right wall, the fresco of Sant'Emiliano is by Tiberio d'Assisi. The fresco above the entrance door, representing Mary with Jesus blessing, is also by that artist.

Inside, on the left is Saint Martin dividing his cloak with a poor man, a work attributable to a pupil of Spagna. On the right is the Virgin, Saint Francis, Saint Anthony, and angels, perhaps by Pierantonio da Foligno. On the high altar there formerly stood the remarkable painting of the Coronation of Mary by Spagna, now in the municipal picture gallery of Trevi.

=== Abbey of San Pietro a Bovara ===
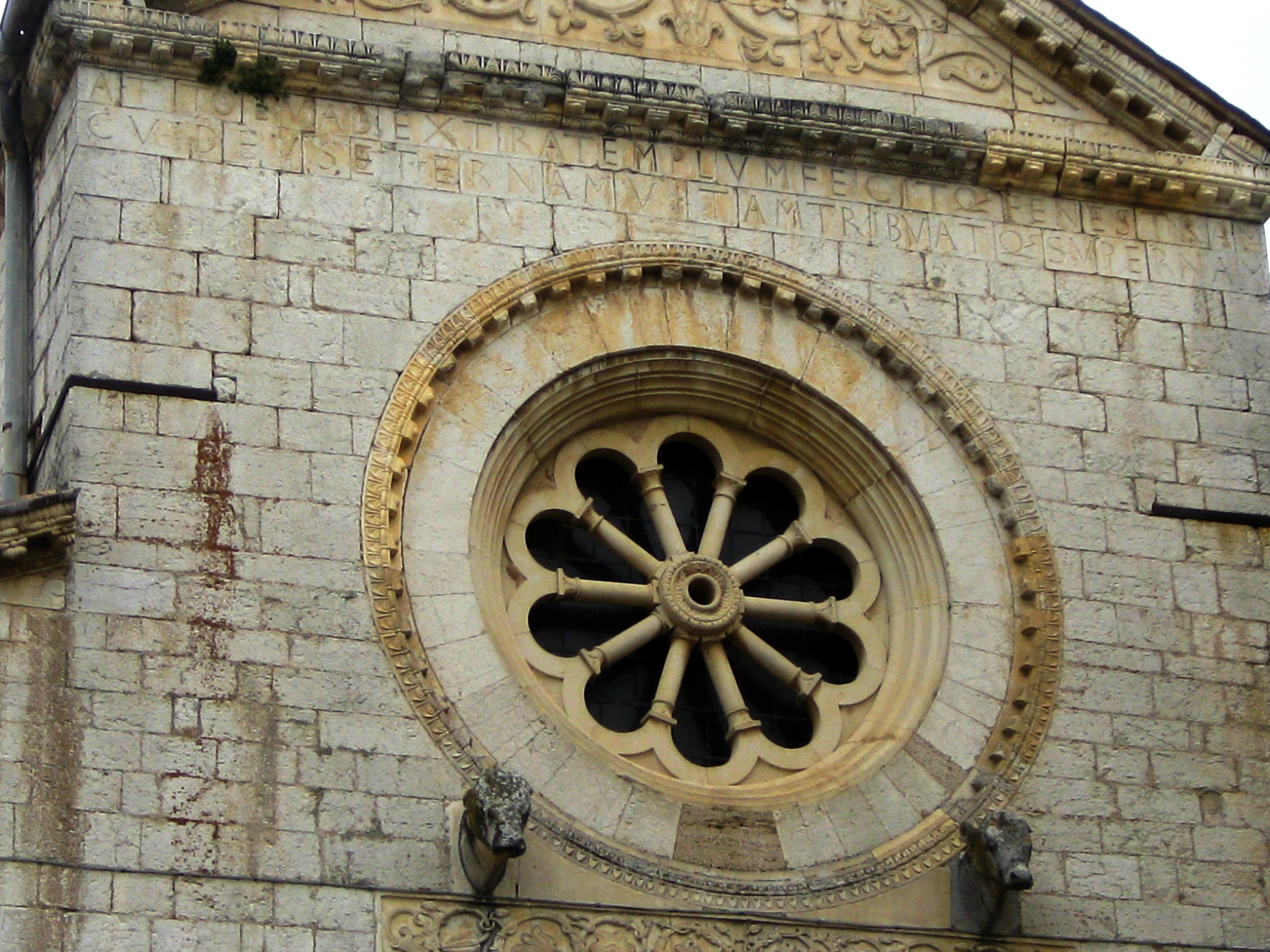
Rose window of the abbey of San Pietro a Bovara, beneath an inscribed frieze

The abbey of San Pietro is located between Trevi and Pissignano in the locality of Bovara. It is first mentioned in 1177 and remained an autonomous and powerful abbey until 1258, when it passed under the jurisdiction of the nearby Sassovivo Abbey. The adjoining church, dating to the 12th century, preserves the original structure of the façade and interior, except for the presbytery, rebuilt in 1622.

The church of San Pietro di Bovara has without foundation been connected by some writers with an ancient cattle market or forum boarium. No trace exists of any building more ancient than the church itself, which dates to the 12th century.

The façade was restored in the 16th century. In the pediment is set a marble sculpture with fine symbolic ornament of the 5th century, placed there at the time of those restorations. The bell tower is ancient in part, while the upper section dates from 1582.

The interior has three naves supported by columns with capitals decorated with simple foliage. Opposite the presbytery, in the central nave, is a small gallery with three little columns supporting pointed members, belonging to the first construction. The choir has seats and backs finely and elegantly carved.

In the chapel of the left nave is a wooden crucifix dated to the 14th century. According to tradition, Friar Pacifico experienced a vision of paradise before this crucifix during a journey with Saint Francis. The episode was later depicted by Giotto in the Basilica of Saint Francis in Assisi. The site is associated with the presence of Saint Francis, who is said to have frequented the church.

Near the abbey stands the Olivo di Sant'Emiliano, identified with the tree to which Saint Emilian, bishop of Trevi, was said to have been tied and killed in 304. The tree is about 9 metres (30 ft) tall and approximately 1,700 years old.

=== San Pietro a Pettine ===
The church of San Pietro a Pettine lies 0.5 kilometres (0.31 mi) north of Trevi. It is a 13th-century construction of dressed stone mixed with stones taken from ancient monuments. Inside, on the left wall, are frescoes of Saint Anthony of Padua with the date 1440 and of the Virgin enthroned with Jesus. On the right wall is a tempera panel representing the Crucifix, Saint John the Evangelist, the Virgin, Saint John the Apostle, a work of the school of Foligno.

=== Other religious buildings ===
The former convent church of Santa Croce contains on the altar wall a fresco of the Crucifix with four small angels at the sides. At the foot of the cross are Mary and Veronica supporting the fainting Virgin Mary, while on the right are Saint John the Evangelist and Mary Magdalene. Another compartment shows the Virgin enthroned with Jesus and the Annunciation. These works belong to the school of Giotto, although they were damaged by poor restorations.

The house of the United Hospitals, belonging to the Congregation of Charity, preserves an ancient frame ending in a pinnacle and bearing at the center a half-length figure of Christ with a sorrowful expression and kneeling angels. It is a tempera work on a gold ground from the 15th century, of the school of Foligno. At the center is a Nativity, a German work of the 16th century.

The church of the Conventual Fathers is described as particularly notable. The church of San Martino, belonging to the Reformed Fathers, contains a notable fresco. Outside the city are the establishments of the Capuchin Fathers and the Reformed Fathers.

Santo Stefano in Manciano, another monastery in Manciano, has only its church remaining.

== Culture ==
=== Palazzo Comunale ===
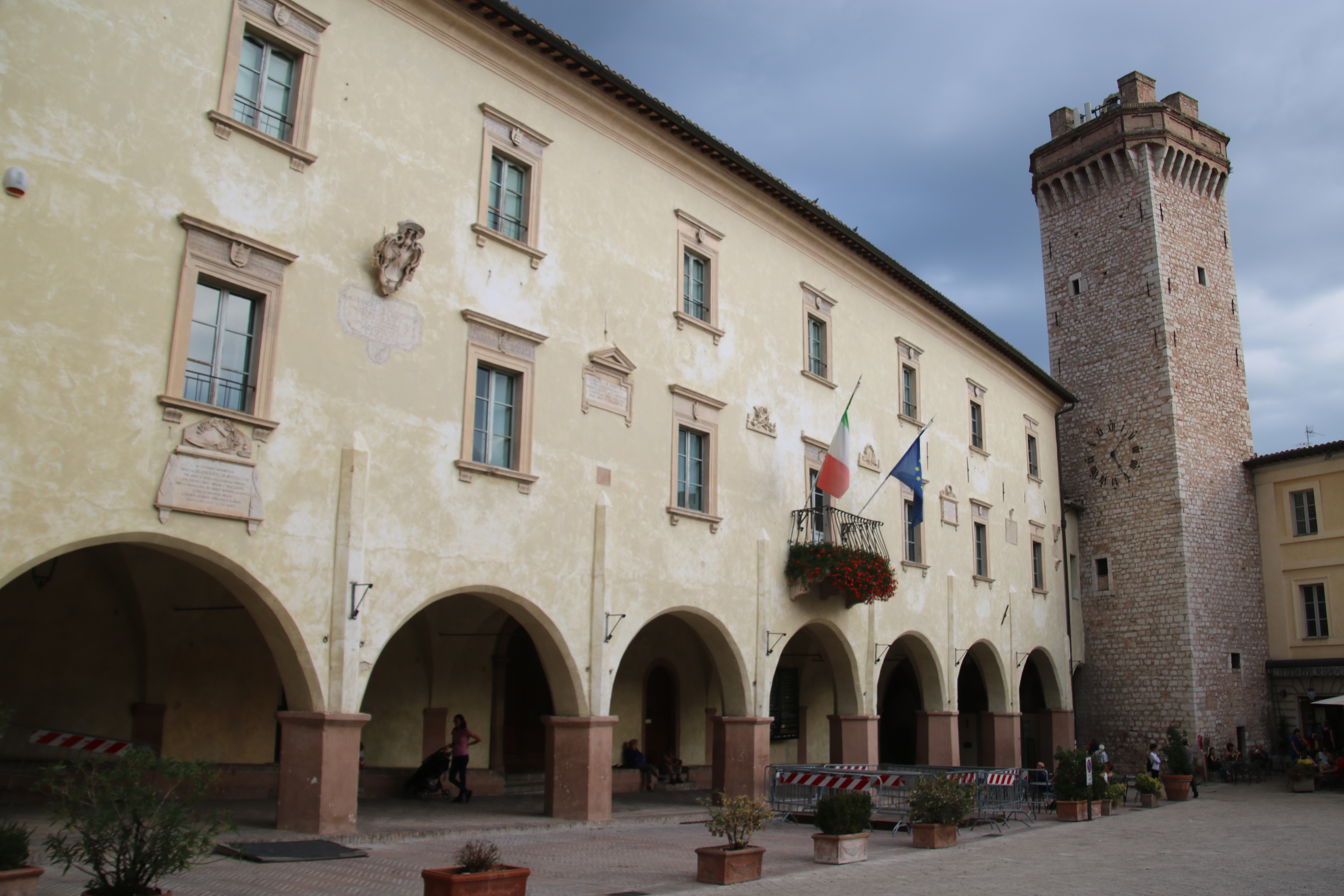
Palazzo comunale with arcaded loggia and adjacent crenellated tower

The municipal palace contains a collection of paintings. Among them is a large oil panel executed in 1522 by Giovanni Spagna. It is divided into several compartments and represents the Coronation of the Virgin, Saint Francis receiving the stigmata, Saint Martin dividing his cloak with a poor man, a view of Umbria, the perspective of the basilica of San Francesco at Assisi, and Saint Catherine.

The municipal palace also preserves a tempera painting of Saint Cecilia, likewise by Spagna; a half-length figure of Mary with Jesus by an imitator of Pinturicchio; the Assumption of the Virgin by a pupil of Guercino; the Burial of Jesus Christ, an oil panel by Sebastiano del Piombo; and a tempera triptych with scenes from the life of Jesus, an imitation of the school of Giotto executed at the end of the 14th century.

In one room are preserved several inscriptions from the Roman age and one from the 16th century.

The Palazzo Comunale dates to the 13th century and adjacent is a 14th-century tower, which served as a symbol of the medieval municipality.

=== Complesso Museale di San Francesco ===
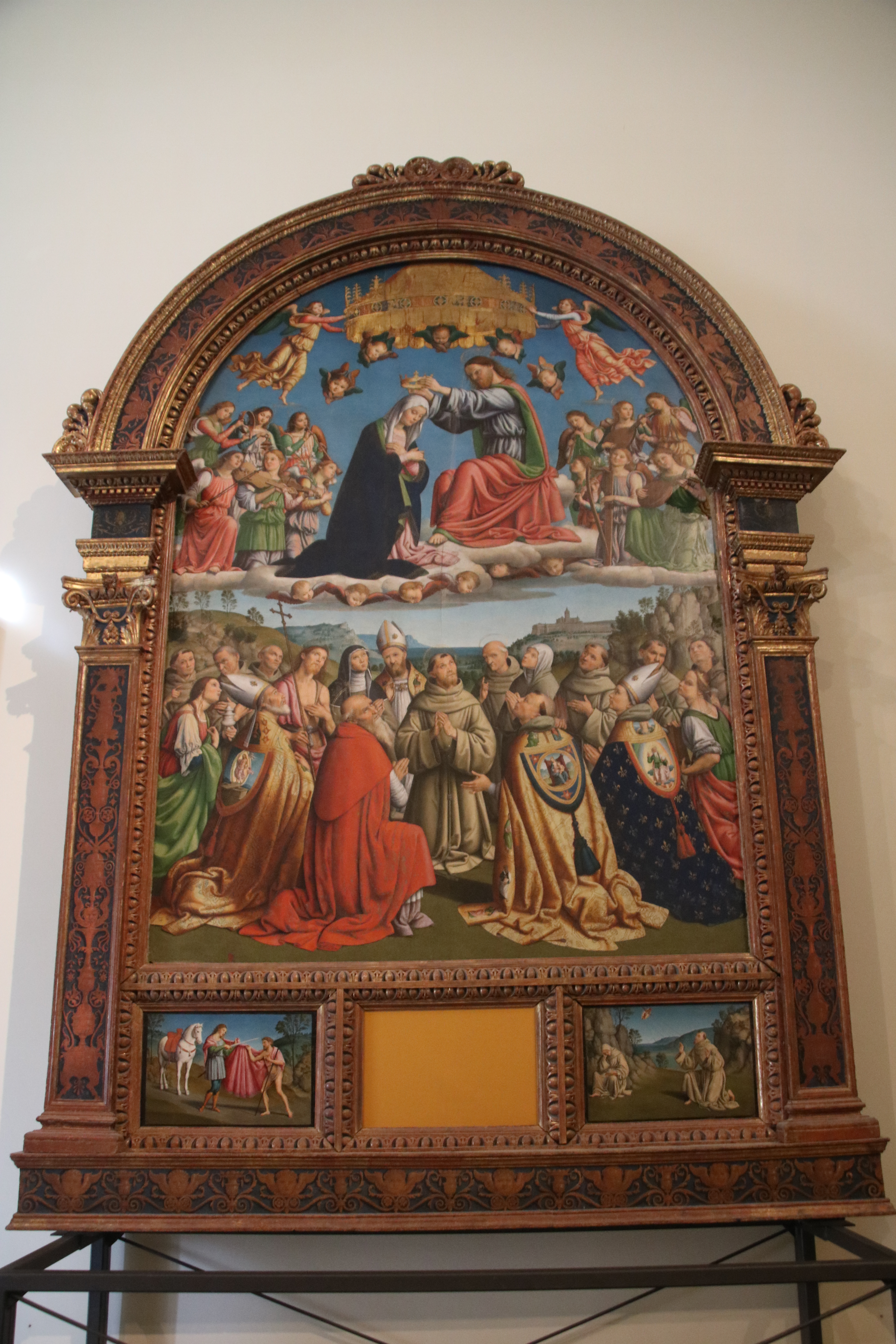
Coronation of the Virgin, a work by Lo Spagna dated 1522

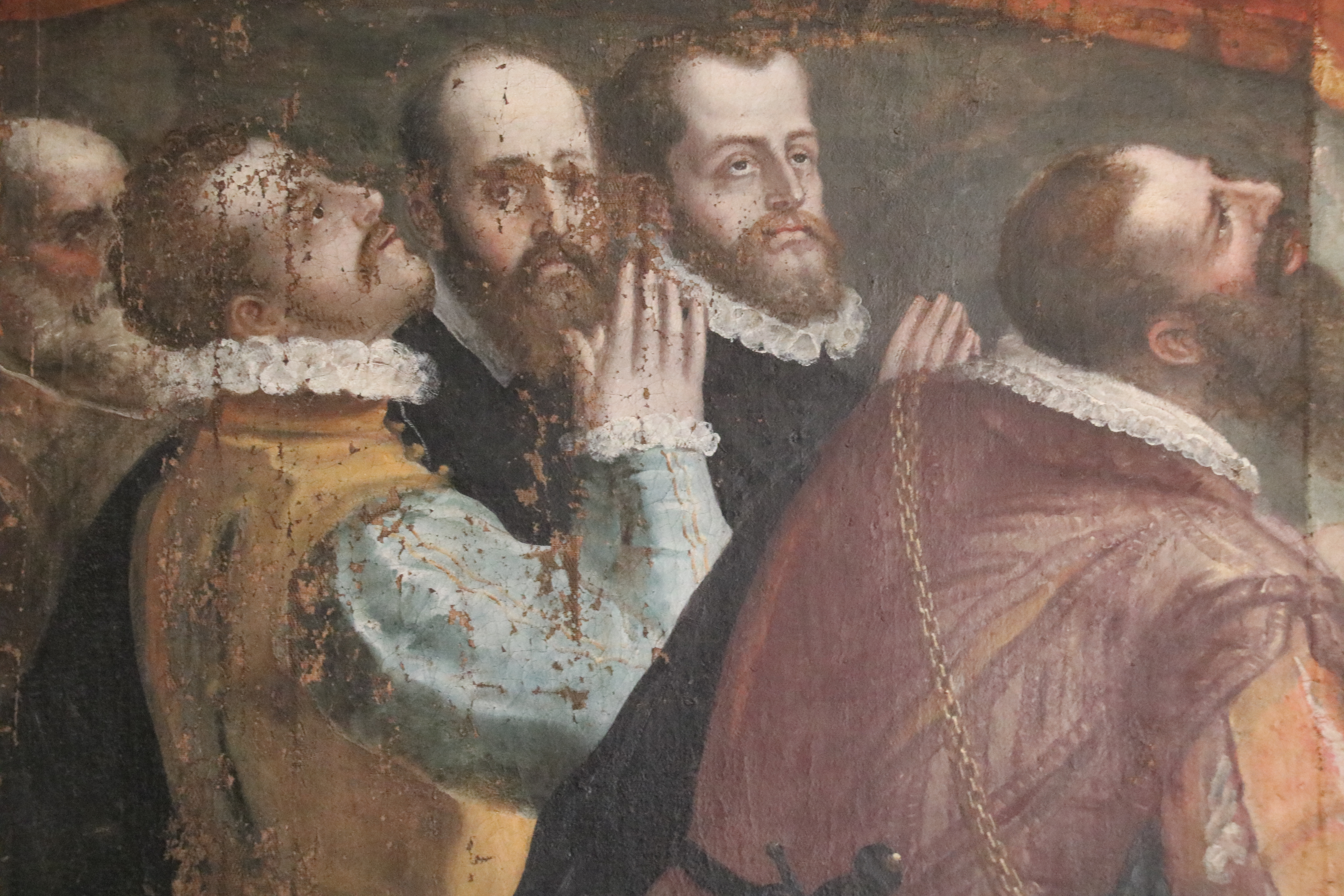
Men in ruff collars, detail from the Madonna of the Rosary by an Umbrian painter, possibly Ascensidonio Spacca

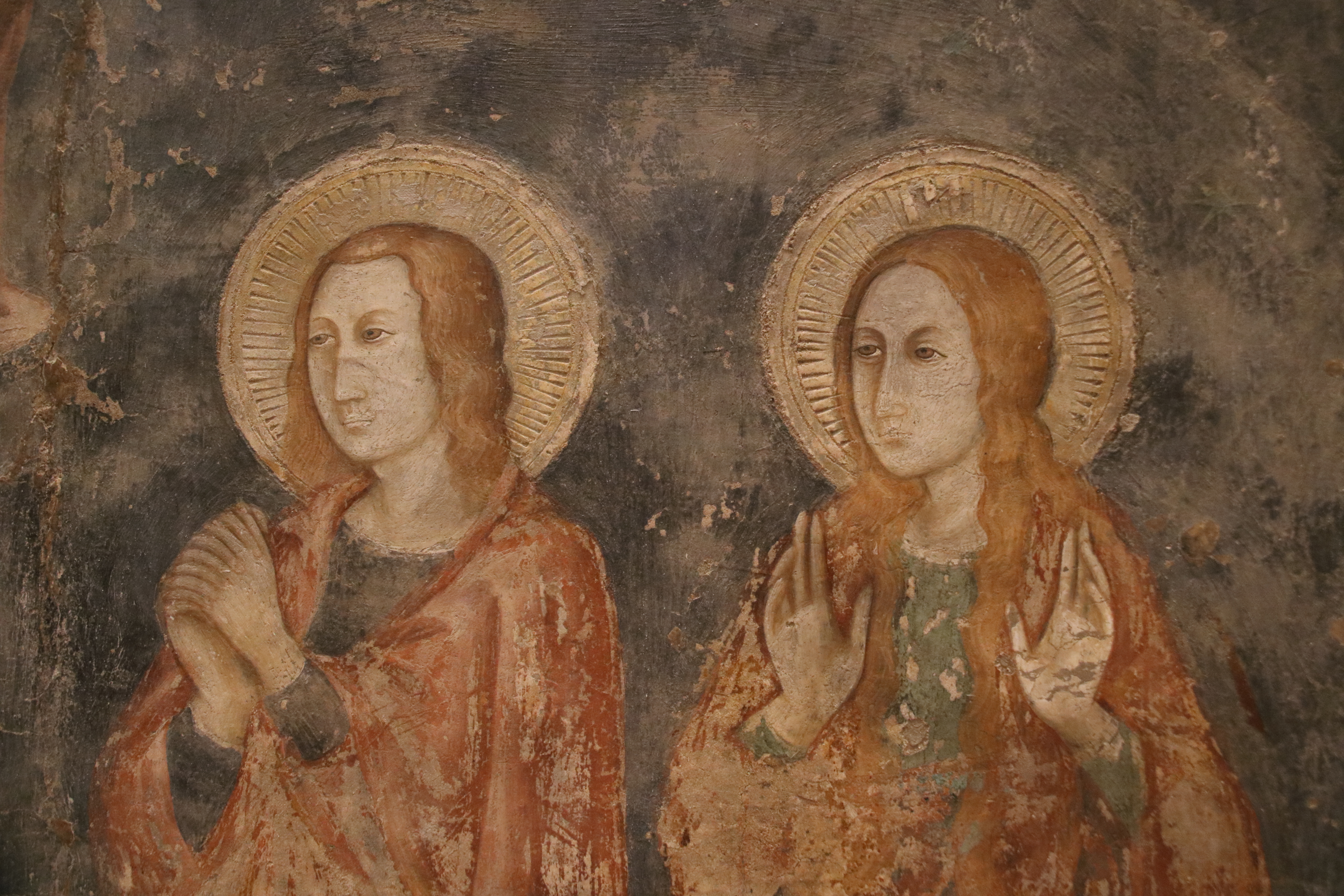
Haloed saints, detail from the Crucifixion by the Maestro di Fossa, c. 1330

The museum complex is housed in the former convent of San Francesco. The convent was built beginning in the 13th century and later rebuilt and decorated in the first half of the 17th century. The cloister is frescoed with scenes from the life of Saint Francis by Bernardino Gagliardi.

The ground floor contains an archaeological section with Italic and Roman finds, including grave goods from the Lombard necropolis of Pietrarossa, as well as materials relating to the history of the town and its territory. The upper floors house works acquired after the suppression of ecclesiastical property following Italian unification, including 14th-century panels and paintings dating from the 16th to the 18th centuries.

Among the works are a processional banner depicting the Madonna della Misericordia with monogram, attributed to a follower of Niccolò Alunno, and an Incoronazione della Vergine dated 1522 by Lo Spagna. The complex also includes the Museum of the Civilization of the Olive, dedicated to olive cultivation and oil production.

The most ornate side is the right side, chosen by the architect to serve as the façade. The principal entrance is decorated with elegant moldings and ends in a pointed arch. In the lunette is a 15th-century fresco representing Mary, Jesus, Saint Francis, and Saint Clare. The apse has the plan of three sides of a hexagon, and each face is divided by pilasters. In the central face opens a double-arched window with remains of colored glass.

The interior has a single nave covered by a fine and rich timber roof. In the 15th century the walls were completely decorated with paintings, now damaged by the addition of large altars and by whitewash.

The adjoining cloister was built in the 16th century and decorated with twenty lunettes painted in fresco with the Stories of Saint Francis. In the first lunette on the left appears the portrait of the painter, Bernardino Gagliardi, with the date 1614.

=== City walls ===
The city wall, dated to the 1st century BC, runs continuously without towers. It is built from small blocks of local white limestone, roughly shaped and laid in horizontal courses with mortar. About three quarters of its original line is still visible. The walls rest directly on a base of exposed bedrock, with added foundation supports likely from the medieval period. The construction follows the slope of the terrain. Three gates open along the line of the wall.

=== Other cultural sites ===
Palazzo Lucarini is a Renaissance building located opposite the church of Sant’Emiliano. It houses the Flash Art Museum, which hosts exhibitions of contemporary art.

Villa Fabri is located outside the town walls and contains frescoed interiors and a garden overlooking the plain of Spoleto.

== Holidays and events ==
The patron saint of Trevi is St. Emiliano; his feast is celebrated on January 27 with a night-time procession of the Illuminata, in which his statue is carried out of the Duomo around the city along the line of the earliest medieval walls.

Shrove Tuesday sees a public celebration in the main piazza, and August a 3‑week-long music festival; but the main annual festivals take place in October: the Palio on the first Sunday, the Celery and Sausage Fair (Sagra del Sedano Nero e della Salsiccia) on the third Sunday, and a historical pageant on the fourth Sunday.

=== Ottobre Trevano ===
Ottobre Trevano ("Trevian October") is an annual cultural event celebrated in the town of Trevi, during the month of October. The festivities are characterized by historical reenactments, community gatherings, and traditional competitions.

The celebrations commence with the Palio dei Terzieri, held on the first Sunday of October. Teams representing Trevi's historic neighborhoods, or terzieri (Castello, Matiggia, and Piano), participate in a distinctive cart race. Competitors push and pull a 430 kg wooden cart uphill along an 800-meter route through the town's medieval streets. The race starts at Porta Nuova and concludes in Piazza del Comune, where the runner known as the bàlio retrieves a symbolic key from the statue of the "Mora" and rings the city bell, symbolically reenacting the city's historical reconquest. The winning team is determined by the shortest completion time with the fewest penalties.

Another notable feature of Ottobre Trevano is the establishment of Cantinette, temporary taverns located throughout Trevi's historical center. These taverns serve traditional Umbrian cuisine and local wines, highlighting regional specialties such as Trevian olive oil, black celery, and sausage.

Additional activities throughout the month include historical parades, musical performances, artisan markets, and cultural exhibitions. The event concludes with a historical pageant on the fourth Sunday, depicting significant episodes from Trevi's medieval past through theatrical performances and processions.

Ottobre Trevano is a significant local tradition that emphasizes historical heritage, community participation, and regional gastronomy.

== Notable people ==
Among the notable men of Trevi were Battista Natalucci, secretary to Alfonso of Aragon; Fausto Valenti, famous archiater in Rome; Bernardo Mazzieri, archiater to Pope Eugene IV; Evangelista Urighi, physician to the Orsini and to Sixtus IV; Filippo Palazzi, known for his treatise published at Perugia in 1570, De vera methodo quibuscumque vulneribus medendis; Natimbene Valenti, celebrated jurist and reformer of the local statute; Ferdinando Valenti, consistorial advocate and author of renowned works in juridical and ecclesiastical matters; Durastante Natalucci and Muzio Petroni, historians; and Fanteo Palazzi and Sante Ponzio, men of letters.

In arms, distinction was won by Francesco Manenteschi, called da Pettino, who fought with Braccio da Montone and was prefect of the Genoese and of Martin V; Melchiorre Minerva, captain of the men of Spoleto and Trevi against the Trinci, who defeated the famous condottiere Barnabone at the gates of Foligno and decided the day of 9 September 1439, when Trinci dominion ended with the capture of Corrado II and his three sons; Giacomo Valenti, governor of the forces in Marittima, Campagna, and the duchy of Urbino; and Gaetano Valenti, papal general in Austria and Hungary.

Among other notable figures is the music master Tiberio Natalucci.
