= San Pietro in Bovara =

Church in Bovara, Italy

Coordinates: 42.859671°N 12.747193°E

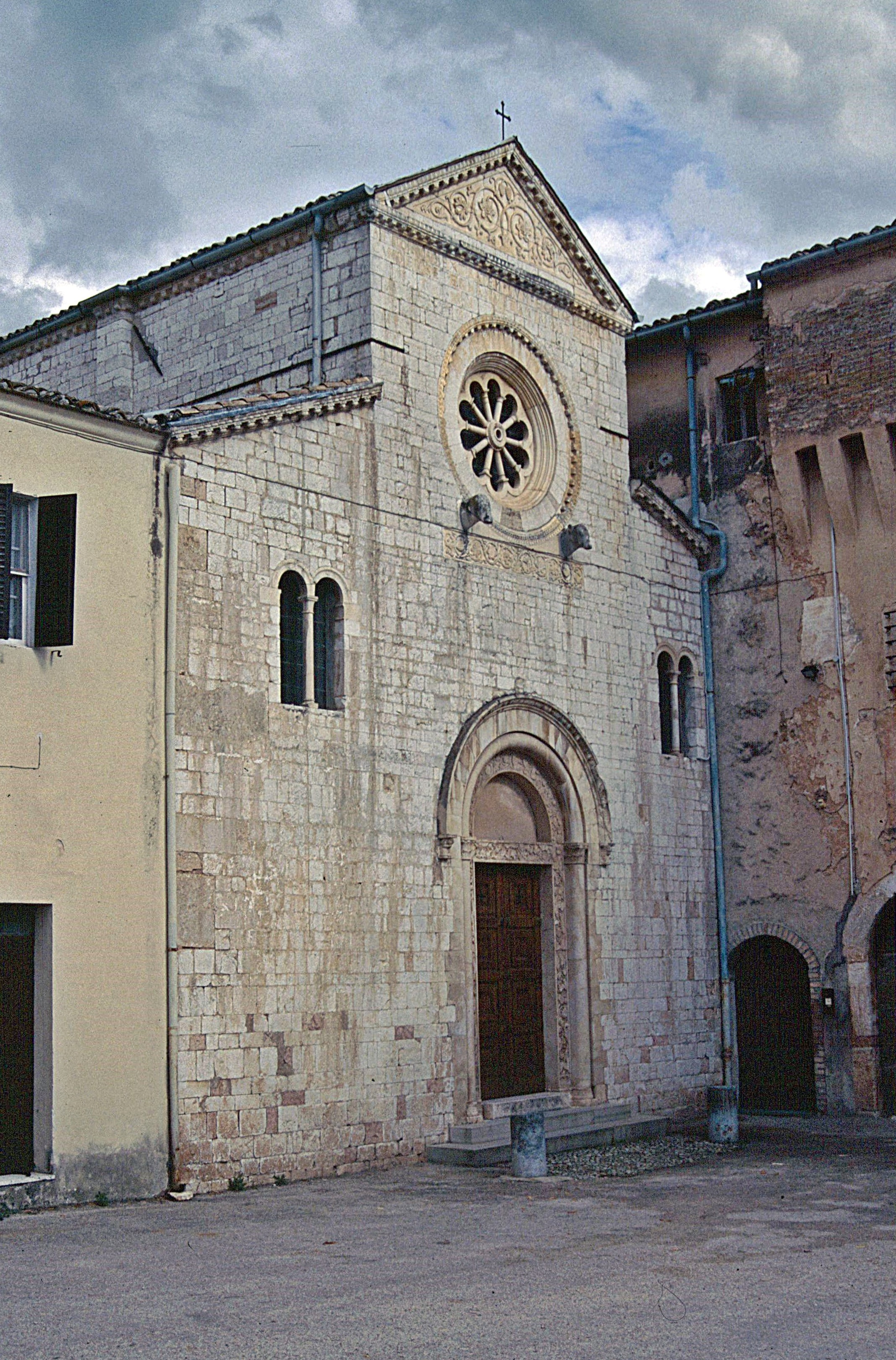
San Pietro in Bovara facade.

San Pietro in Bovara is a Romanesque and Gothic-style, Roman Catholic church and abbey located on Via Don Sturzo #2 in Bovara, a frazione of the town of Trevi, in the province of Perugia, region of Umbria, central Italy.

== History and description ==
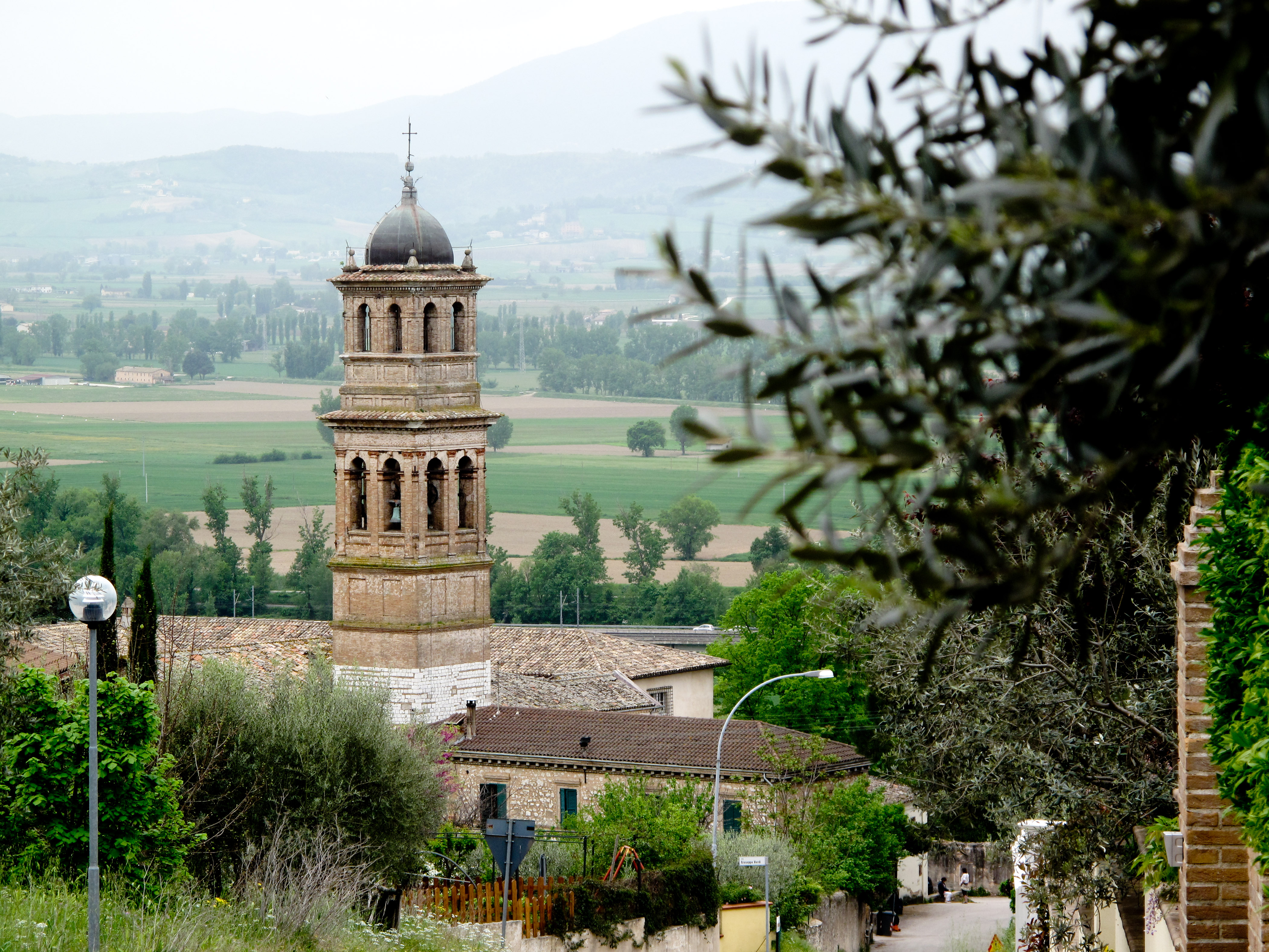
Bell-tower of San Pietro

A church and Benedictine abbey at the site is documented from the 12th century. An inscription below the facade tympanum mentions the name Atto who may the master involved in the construction of San Lorenzo in Spello and the Duomo of Foligno during 1120–1140. For the next three centuries, the abbey was torn by competing ownership by different orders and institutions. It is said St Francis and his follower Pacifico stayed at the abandoned abbey in the early 13th-century. In 1484, the abbey was granted to the Olivetan order, and remained so until suppressions in the 19th century. The church is now a parish church.

The facade was rebuilt in a generally Gothic arrangement with a tall nave, a large spoked rose window, and flanking mullioned windows. The rounded arch for portal has a floral decoration, although it is unclear to when it dates. Peculiar to this church are floral friezes below the rose window and two metal corbels in the shape of cow's heads. The interior naves are divided by heavy Romanesque columns. A 16th-century cloister is attached to the church. While the base of the bell-tower shows the white stone Romanesque construction, the elaborate domed higher stories date from the 17th century.
