= Castel Ritaldi =

- Comune
- Comune di Castel Ritaldi
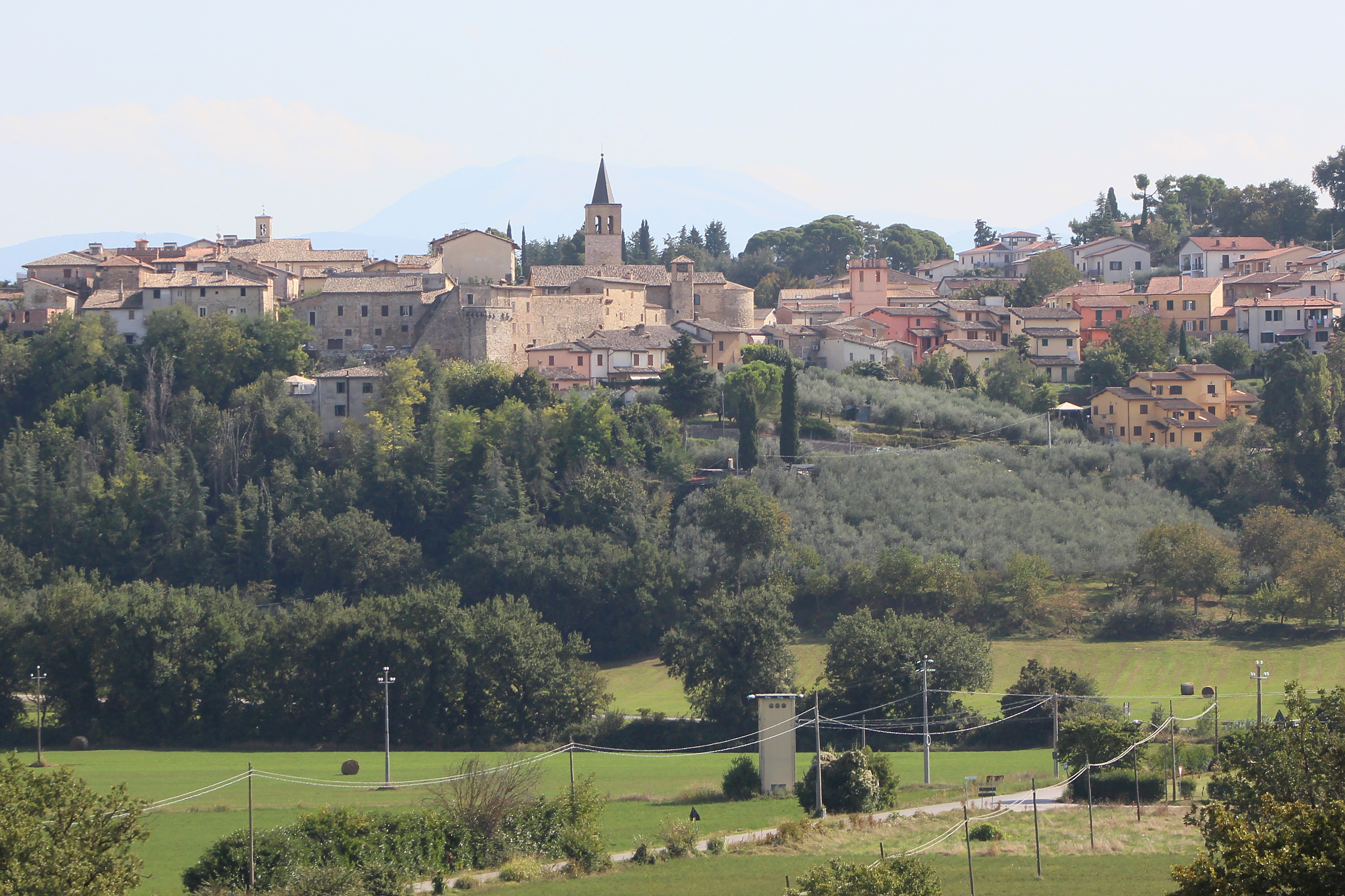
- Castel Ritaldi Castle

- Coat of arms

- Location within Italy Location within Umbria
- Coordinates: 42.823033°N 12.672453°E
- Country: Italy
- Region: Umbria
- Province: Perugia

Government
  - Mayor: Andrea Reali

Area
  - Total: 22.44 km^{2} (8.66 sq mi)
- Elevation: 297 m (974 ft)

Population (1 January 2025)
  - Total: 3,017
  - Density: 134.4/km^{2} (348.2/sq mi)
- Demonym: Castelritaldesi
- Time zone: UTC+1 (CET)
  - Summer (DST): UTC+2 (CEST)
- Postal code: 06044
- Dialing code: 0743
- Patron saint: Saint Marina
- Website: Official website

Castel Ritaldi is a comune (municipality) in the Province of Perugia in the Italian region Umbria, located about 40 km southeast of Perugia.

== Etymology ==
Castel Ritaldi takes its name from the Ritaldi family, described in 19th-century sources as an ancient feudal lineage of the area.

== History ==
Until the early 13th century, Castel Ritaldi was an imperial fief. Shortly after 1213 it passed under the authority of the Roman Curia, which governed it through a vicar responsible for justice and taxation, while certain feudal rights remained with the Lambardi, Cattanei and Litaldesi families.

Over the course of the 13th century the commune was drawn into the expansionist policy of Spoleto. By November 1247 it formed part of the district of Spoleto, and in June 1254 the feudal families formally ceded their remaining rights to the city. In 1298 the castle was forcibly resubmitted by Spoleto after resistance and ecclesiastical opposition.

Between 1572 and 1585 municipal statutes were compiled, giving formal shape to local institutions.

During the Roman Republic of 1798–1799 the municipality was included in the Department of Clitunno. Under French rule from 1809 to 1814 it was reorganized as a mairie. Following the reforms promoted by Cardinal Ercole Consalvi in November 1817, local government was entrusted to a gonfaloniere under the restored papal administration.

In 1849 the brief return of the Roman Republic interrupted papal rule, which was subsequently restored. After the conquest of Umbria by Piedmontese forces, a decree of 17 September 1860 dissolved existing municipal councils. Between 1860 and 1865 the commune was integrated into the administrative system of the Kingdom of Italy.

On 10 March 1865, under Law no. 2248, Castel Ritaldi risked suppression due to its small population. The municipal council opposed annexation to Montefalco on 11 February 1875. By royal decree of 29 June 1875 Castel San Giovanni was aggregated to the commune, raising the population to 1,658 inhabitants.

On 10 March 1927 the municipality was suppressed and reduced to a delegation dependent on Spoleto, but in 1932 it was restored as an autonomous commune.

== Geography ==
Castel Ritaldi is situated on a hilltop and lies about 5 miles (8.0 km) from Montefalco and 8 miles (13 km) from Spoleto. The hamlet of Colle del Marchese forms part of the municipality.

Castel Ritaldi borders the following municipalities: Giano dell'Umbria, Montefalco, Spoleto, Trevi.

=== Subdivisions ===
The municipality includes the localities of Borgo, Bruna, Casa Fiorelli, Casa Stendardo, Castel Ritaldi, Castel San Giovanni, Colle del Marchese, Mercatello, Pieve, Rotabella, San Lorenzo, Santa Lucia, Tervenano, Torre Grosso.

In 2021, 425 people lived in rural dispersed dwellings not assigned to any named locality. At the time, the most populous localities were Bruna (1,242), and Castel Ritaldi proper (543).

== Economy ==
In the mid-19th century, the majority of the population was engaged in agricultural work within the local territory. Grain production was considered sufficient, while wine was produced in abundance. Olive oil and acorns were also important products.

== Religion and culture ==
=== San Gregorio in Nido ===
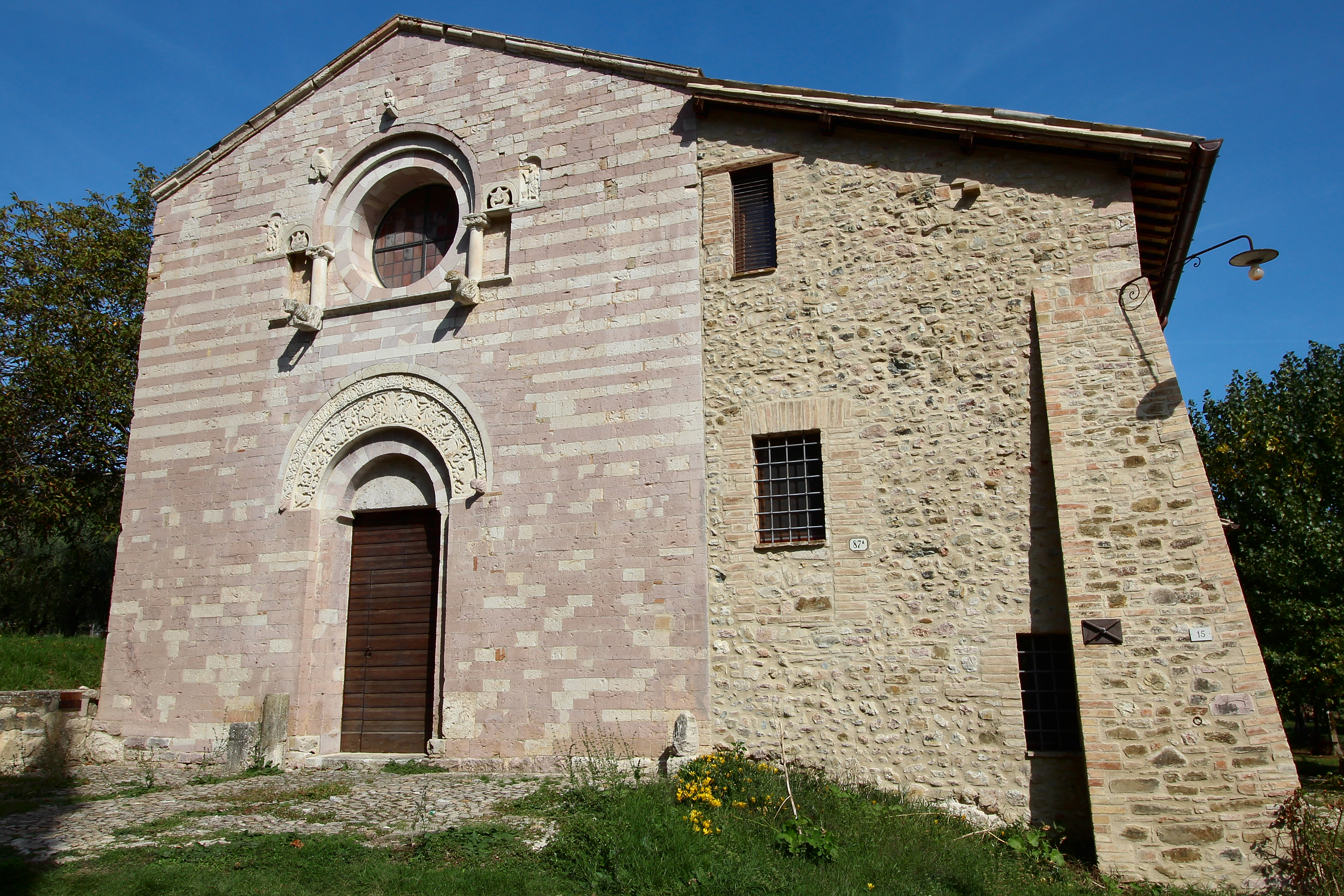
Church of San Gregorio

The pieve of San Gregorio in Nido stands along the road linking Castel Ritaldi to Colle del Marchese. Its façade, rebuilt after the 1997 earthquake, consists of alternating horizontal layers of white and red stone and features a recessed portal. Above the entrance arch, which bears the date 1141, are a sequence of carved scenes. Above the portal is a window with a multi-centered arch flanked by two niches containing columns with Ionic capitals. Surrounding these are symbols of the Evangelists and two demons beside figures of prophets. The star motif from the original rose window is mounted on the bell gable.

The earliest record of the church dates to 1066. Its structure was partly rebuilt in 1141, likely due to structural problems. It served as the parish church of Castel Ritaldi until 1828, when the title was transferred to a church within the town.

=== Santa Marina ===
The church of Santa Marina has a single nave with two large niches and two high-ceilinged chapels supported by trussed beams. A wooden statue with angels, kept in a case inside the church, depicts Saint Marina holding a child. The presbytery is raised by two steps and enclosed by an arch resting on two columns; beneath the former reticulated pavement is a crypt used by the Confraternity of the Most Holy Sacrament.

To the right of the altar is a niche with a fresco by Tiberio d'Assisi, depicting the Eternal Father on golden clouds with a globe and an iridescent arc, surrounded by seraphim and angels. Below are Saint Catherine of Alexandria, Tobiah with the archangel Raphael, and Pope Saint Sylvester I above a slain dragon.

To the left of the main altar stands another altar dedicated to the Madonna del Soccorso, accompanied by a panel painting dated 1509 showing the Virgin freeing a possessed child. The work is attributed to Francesco Melanzio. A 14th-century crucifix is preserved in the sacristy. The apse contains a 14th-century fresco with numerous saints.

The chapel of Saint Anthony Abbot preserves fragmentary frescoes and an altar dedicated to Saint Marina next to the sacristy.

=== Sanctuary of Madonna Bruna ===
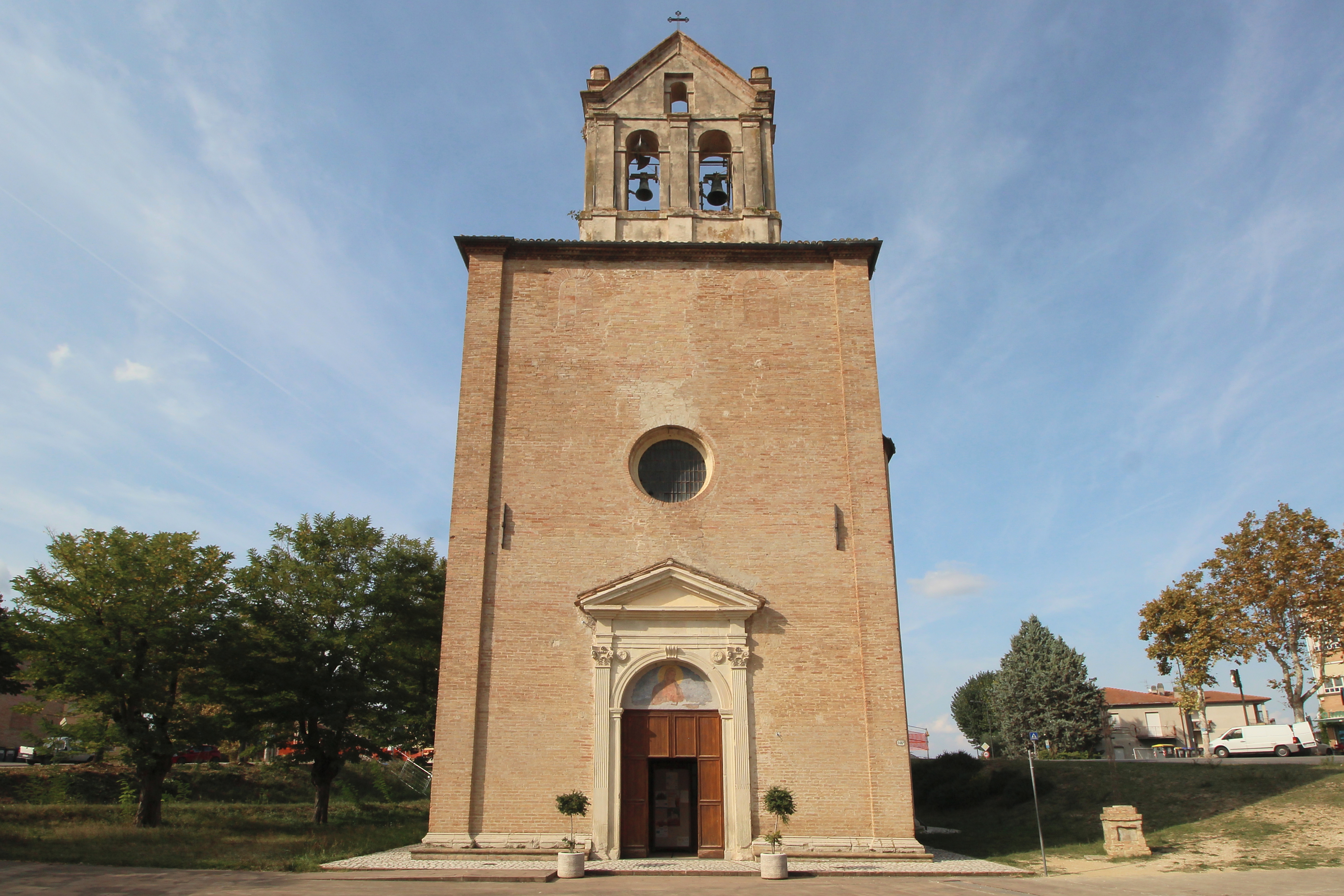
Madonna della Bruna

The Sanctuary of Madonna Bruna is a Renaissance structure associated with Bramantesque architecture and stands near the Tatarena stream. It has a single nave in the form of a cross surrounded by three equally sized apses. The main altar contains a large fresco of the Madonna della Bruna attributed to Tiberio d'Assisi, while the apsidal frescoes are by Pier Matteo Piergili.

According to legend, in June 1706 a group of pilgrims resting by the stream on their way to Montefalco were unable to lift their banner until its image was painted on the church wall. When the painter returned the next day to complete the work, he found it miraculously finished.

=== Other religious buildings ===
The parish church is dedicated to Santa Massima and is equipped with an organ. It houses a painting of Our Lady of Perpetual Help (Madonna del Soccorso), attributed in 19th-century sources to the school of Perugino.

Among the notable buildings in Castel Ritaldi are the former monastery of Santa Maria di Scigliano, once a Benedictine abbey and later a summer residence of the Archbishops of Spoleto.

== Twin towns ==
- Ijadabra, Lebanon
