= San Bernardino in Panisperna =

San Bernardino a Panisperna
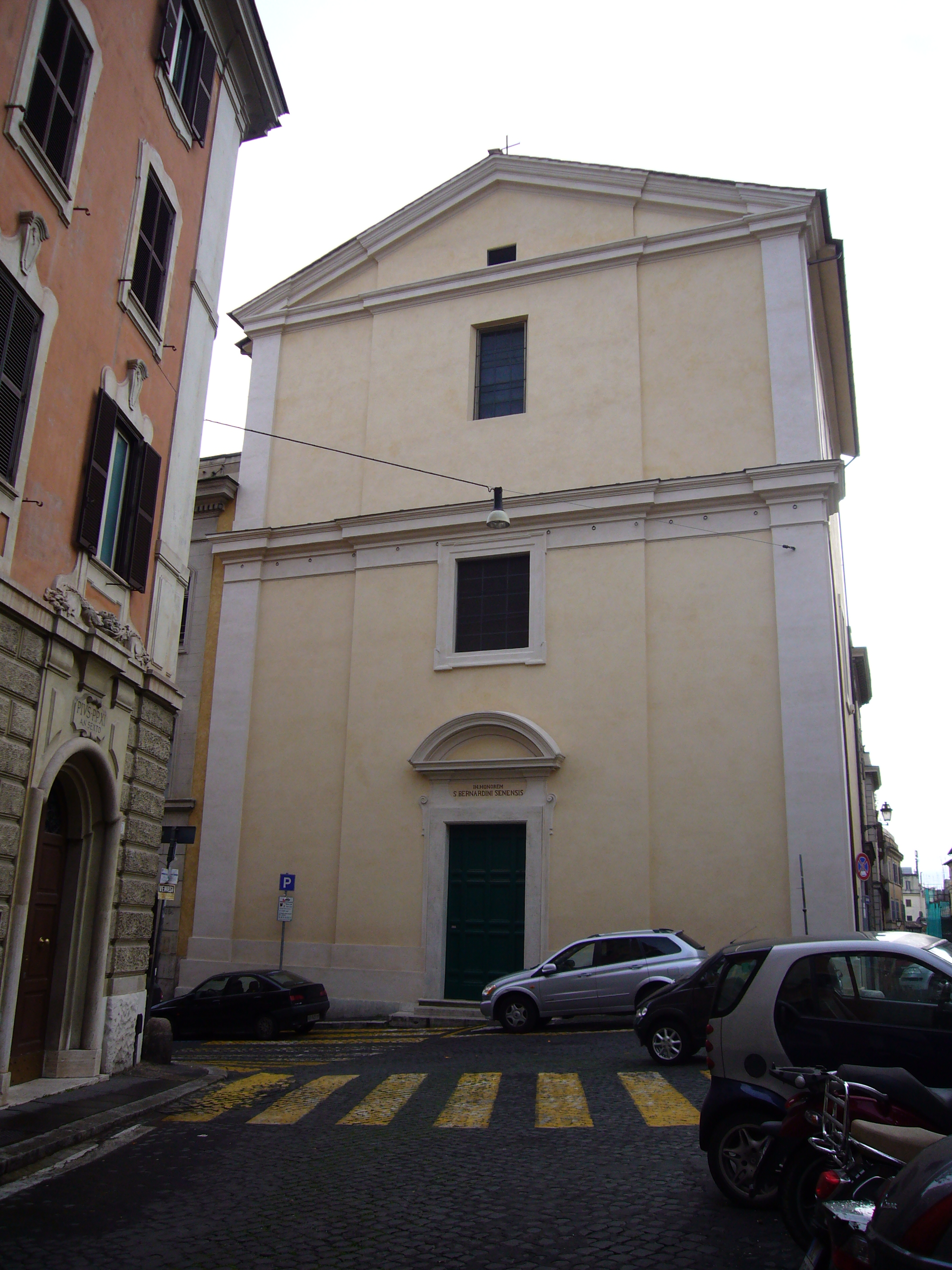
- San Bernardino a Panisperna
- Click on the map for a fullscreen view
- 41°53′45″N 12°29′21″E
- Location: Via Panisperna, Monti, Rome
- Country: Italy
- Denomination: Roman Catholic
- Tradition: Roman Rite

History
- Consecrated: 1625

Architecture
- Architectural type: Church

San Bernardino in Panisperna or Panispermia or San Bernardino ai Monti or San Bernardino da Siena ai Monti is a small Roman Catholic church in Rome. It is found across from the church of Sant'Agata dei Goti on via Panisperna in the Rione Monti.

The church was built on the ruins of the monastery of Santa Veneranda. The church was consecrated in 1625. The Baroque interior is elliptical in shape, and the cupola was frescoed by Bernardino Gagliardi with a Glory of San Bernardino and other Franciscan Saints. Over the door to the sacristy is a canvas by Giovanni Baglione depicting Saints Francis, Clare, and Agatha. Since 2003, the church has ministered to a Chinese catholic community in Rome.

== Sources ==
- M. Armellini, Le chiese di Roma dal secolo IV al XIX, Roma 1891, p. 203
- Roma nell’anno MDCCCXXXVIII descritta da Antonio Nibby, Parte prima Moderna, Roma 1839, pp. 129–130
- C. Rendina, Le Chiese di Roma, Newton & Compton Editori, Roma 2000, p. 47 ISBN 978-88-541-1833-1
