= Torre Grosso =

- Frazione
- Location within Italy
- Coordinates: 42°49′56″N 12°39′30″E
- Country: Italy
- Region: Umbria
- Province: Perugia
- Comune: Castel Ritaldi
- Elevation: 319 m (1,047 ft)

Population (2001)
  - Total: 85
- Time zone: UTC+1 (CET)
  - Summer (DST): UTC+2 (CEST)
- Postcode: 06044
- Area code: 0743
- Website: http://www.torregrosso.com

Torre Grosso is a frazione of the comune of Castel Ritaldi in the Province of Perugia, Umbria, central Italy. It stands at an elevation of 319 metres above sea level. At the time of the Istat census of 2001 it had 85 inhabitants.
