= Santo Stefano in Manciano =

Medieval abbey in Umbria, Italy

Coordinates: 42.9160°N 12.7575°E

Santo Stefano in Manciano is a medieval abbey, long abandoned, at Manciano (frazione of Trevi) in Umbria, Italy. Now only the ruined church, dating at the latest to the first half of the 13th century, remains.
