= Emilianus of Trevi =

Early Christian bishop

Emilianus Bishop of Trevi
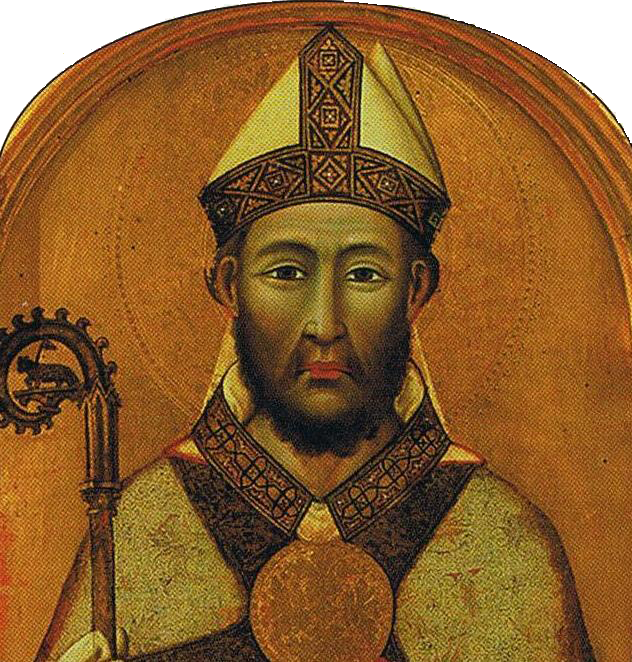
- 14th-century depiction of Saint Emilianus of Trevi, by Meo di Siena
- Church: Catholic Church
- In office: 296 – 302 or 304
- Predecessor: none (office established)

Saint Emilianus of Trevi (Italian: Emiliano - or Miliano - di Trevi), sometimes Æmilianus (died 302 or 304), was a 4th-century bishop of Trevi, martyred under Diocletian.

== Life ==
An account of his life is given in the Passio Sancti Miliani. Two codices exist of this account, one of the 9th century at Montecassino and one of the 12th century in the archives of Spoleto Cathedral. There are also extant what may be copies from an older document, of the 5th or 6th century.

Originally from Armenia, in 296 AD Emilianus was consecrated by Pope Marcellinus as first bishop of Trevi. During the persecution of Diocletian he refused to perform sacrifices to the Roman gods and was then subjected to innumerable tortures and eventually put to death on 28 January 302 (or 304) together with three companions. He was decapitated three kilometres from Trevi, at Bovara, then a pagan holy place, bound to an olive tree which is said still to exist today.

His body was then transported and buried in Spoleto. During the tumultuous Middle Ages his relics had been forgotten – possibly hidden or stolen – but were rediscovered in 1660 during restoration work on Spoleto Cathedral, where they are still preserved.

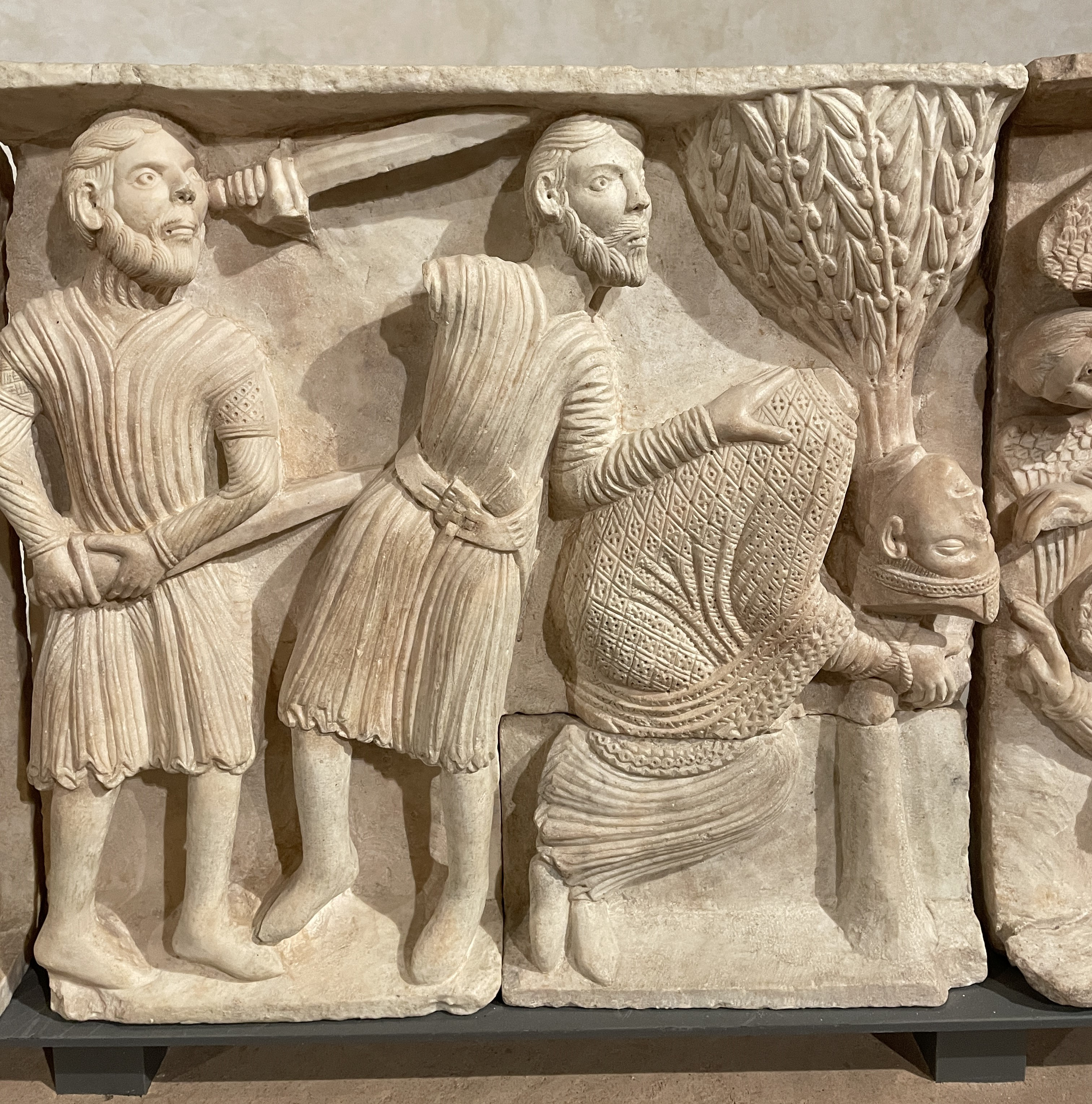
Fourth panel of the martyrdom of Emilianus: the bishop is tied to an olive tree and beheaded. Museo Nazionale del Ducato, Spoleto

His trial and execution are depicted on a late-12th-century sculpture consisting on five panels, carved from re-used late-antique columns. On the work, the proconsul sentences Emilianus to death. He is first whipped and then preparations are made to burn him alive, but the cold freezes the executioners' hands and extinguishes their torches. He is then fed to wild beasts who instead kneel before him. Finally, he is tied to an olive tree and beheaded.

== Cult ==
Emilianus is the patron of Trevi and his feast day is 28 January. The celebrations, going back to remote antiquity, culminates in the nocturnal procession, the Processione dell'Illuminata, held on the feast's eve (27 January).

The saint is also venerated at Ripa in Perugia where his feast in celebrated on the Sunday closest to 28 January.
