= Bovara =

- Frazione
- Location of Bovara in Italy
- Coordinates: 42°51′N 12°45′E
- Country: Italy
- Region: Umbria
- Province: Perugia
- Comune: Trevi

Population (2001)
  - Total: 300
- Time zone: UTC+1 (CET)
  - Summer (DST): UTC+2 (CEST)

Bovara is a village in the Italian province of Perugia in east central Umbria on the lower flank of Monte Serano. It is a frazione of Trevi, which is 2 km northwards. Its population is around 300.

The name of the town derives from Latin (forum) boarium, a cattle market, and the area has been known for its cattle since Roman times. In the 1950s an Umbrian inscription was found there, now conserved at the Museo S. Francesco in Trevi; and a Roman mosaic still exists in situ (although reburied). The chief interest of Bovara, however, lies in the attractive Romanesque abbey church of S. Pietro.
