= Alfonso of Aragon =

Alfonso of Aragon may refer to:

== Kings of Aragon ==
- Alfonso I the Battler (r. 1104–1134)
- Alfonso II the Chaste or the Troubadour (r. 1164–1196)
- Alfonso III the Liberal or the Free (r. 1285–1291)
- Alfonso IV the Kind (r. 1327–1336)
- Alfonso V the Magnanimous (r. 1416–1458)

== Princes (Infantes) of Aragon ==
- Alfonso (1332–1412), duke of Gandia, count of Denia, count of Ribagorza, marquis of Villena, constable of Castile
- Alfonso (1358–1422), duke of Gandia, count of Denia, count of Ribagorza

== Others ==
- Alfonso Fadrique of Aragon (1294–1338), vicar general of the Duchy of Athens
- Alfonso de Aragón y de Escobar (1417–1495), duke of Villahermosa, count of Ribagorza, grand master of the Order of Calatrava
- Alfons d'Aragó (1455–1514), Bishop of Tortosa, President of the Generalitat de Catalunya and Archbishop of Tarragona
- Alonso de Aragón (1470–1520), archbishop of Zaragoza and Valencia and Lt. general of Aragon
- Alfonso of Aragon (1481–1500), duke of Bisceglie and prince of Salerno
- Alfonso de Aragón y Portugal (1489–1563), count of Ampurias and duke of Segorbe
