= Manciano, Trevi =

Manciano
- Frazione
- Location within Italy
- Coordinates: 42°54′N 12°46′E
- Country: Italy
- Region: Umbria
- Province: Perugia
- Comune: Trevi
- Elevation: 509 m (1,670 ft)

Population (2001)
  - Total: 100
- (estimate)
- Time zone: UTC+1 (CET)
  - Summer (DST): UTC+2 (CEST)
- Postcode: 06039
- Area code: 0742

Manciano is a village in the Italian province of Perugia in east central Umbria on a flank of Mt. Matigge, at altitude 509 m above sea-level. It is a frazione of the comune of Trevi, which is 3 km SSW. Its population is approximately 100 inhabitants.

== Geography ==
The frazione extends several kilometers further to the NE into the Apennine range and the hamlet of Ponze at 904 m altitude, with one more medieval church and a good view of central Umbria.

== Main sights ==
The main point of interest of the village is the church of S. Martino and, not far away, the ruins of the Romanesque abbey church of Santo Stefano in Manciano.
