= Tiberio d'Assisi =

Italian painter

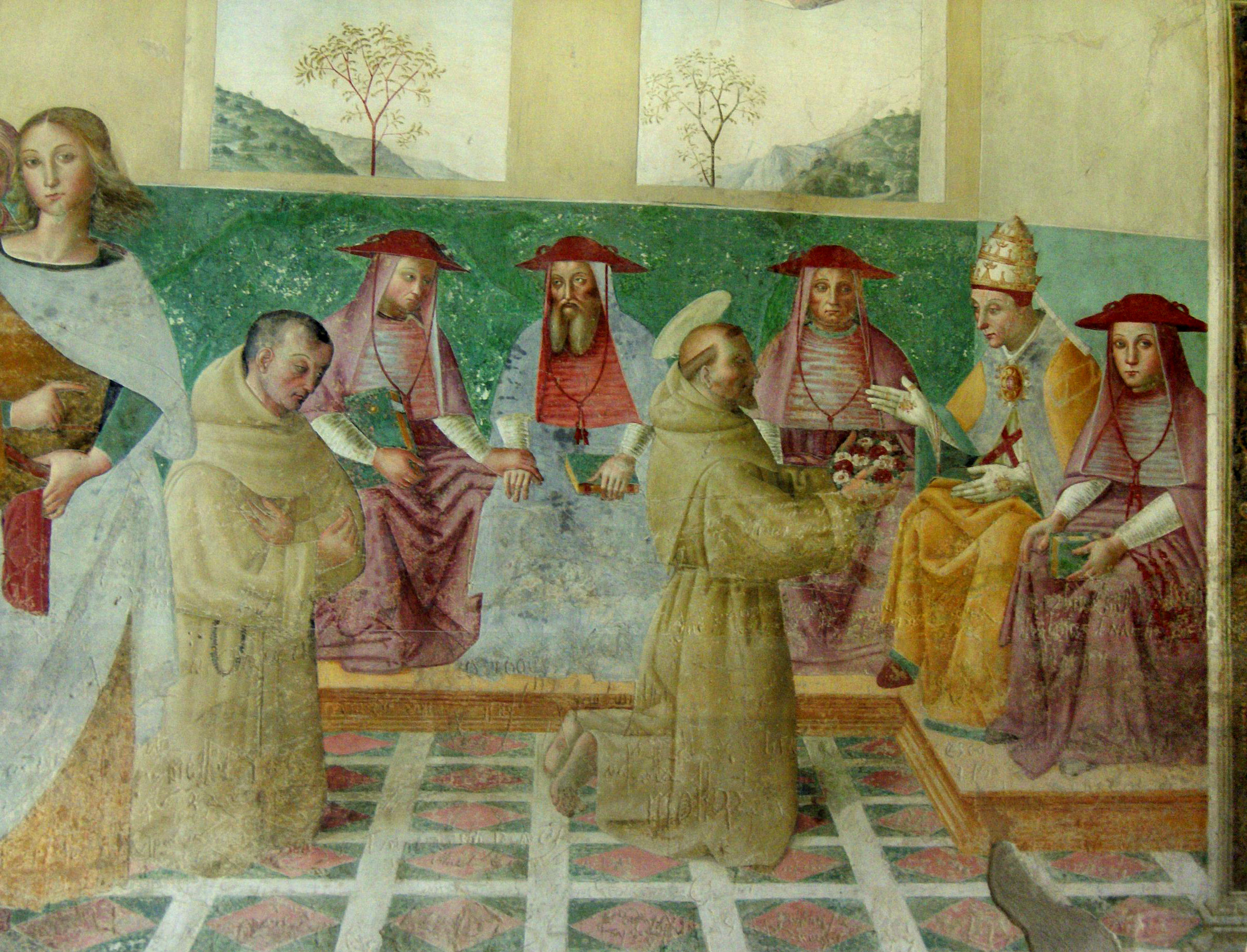
Concession of the Indulgence, Basilica of Santa Maria degli Angeli, Assisi, Italy.

Tiberio d'Assisi (circa 1470–1524) was an Italian painter of the Renaissance period, active in the early 16th century. He painted in the style of Pietro Perugino. He is also known as Tiberio Diatelevi or Tiberio di Assisi.

He painted a Madonna in the church of S. Martino, near Trevi; a Madonna and five scenes from the life of St. Francis (1512), in the church of San Francesco in Montefalco; a St. Sebastian for the church of San Fortunato in Montefalco; a Madonna in S. Domenico in Assisi, and Scenes from the life of St. Francis in Basilica of Santa Maria degli Angeli in the same city (1518). Fresco work was discovered in Castel Ritaldi.

== Gallery ==
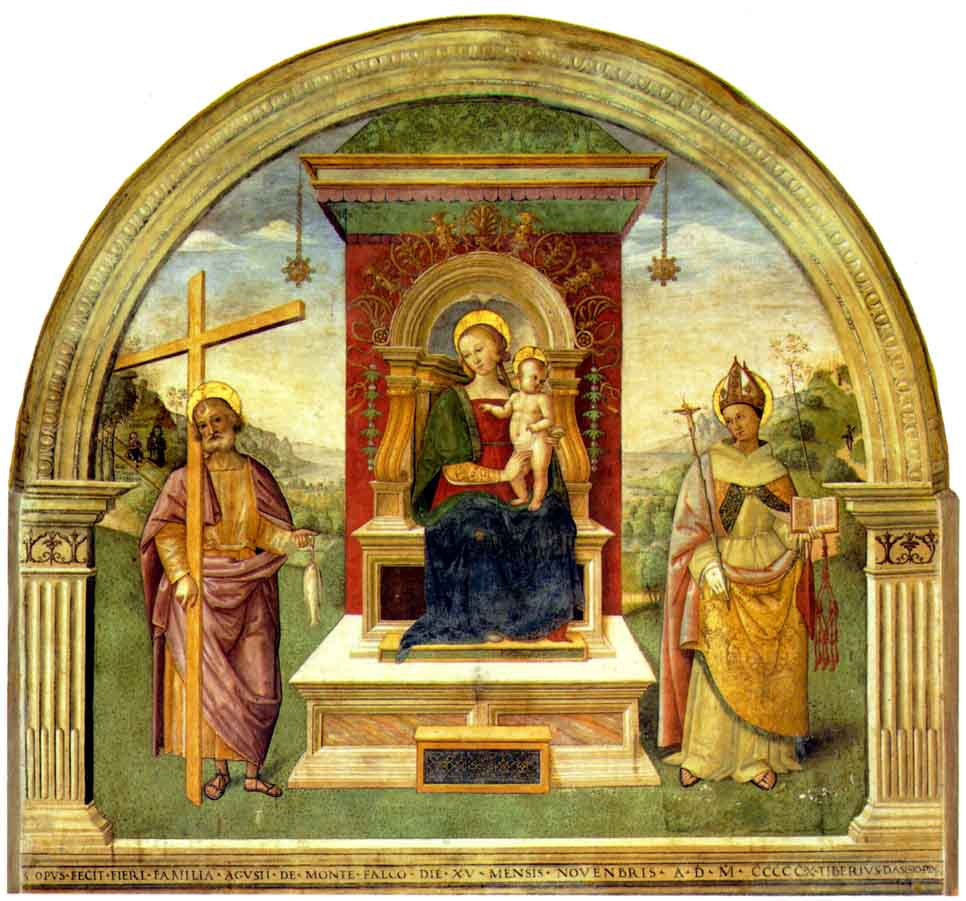
Madonna and Child with Saints Peter and Bonaventure

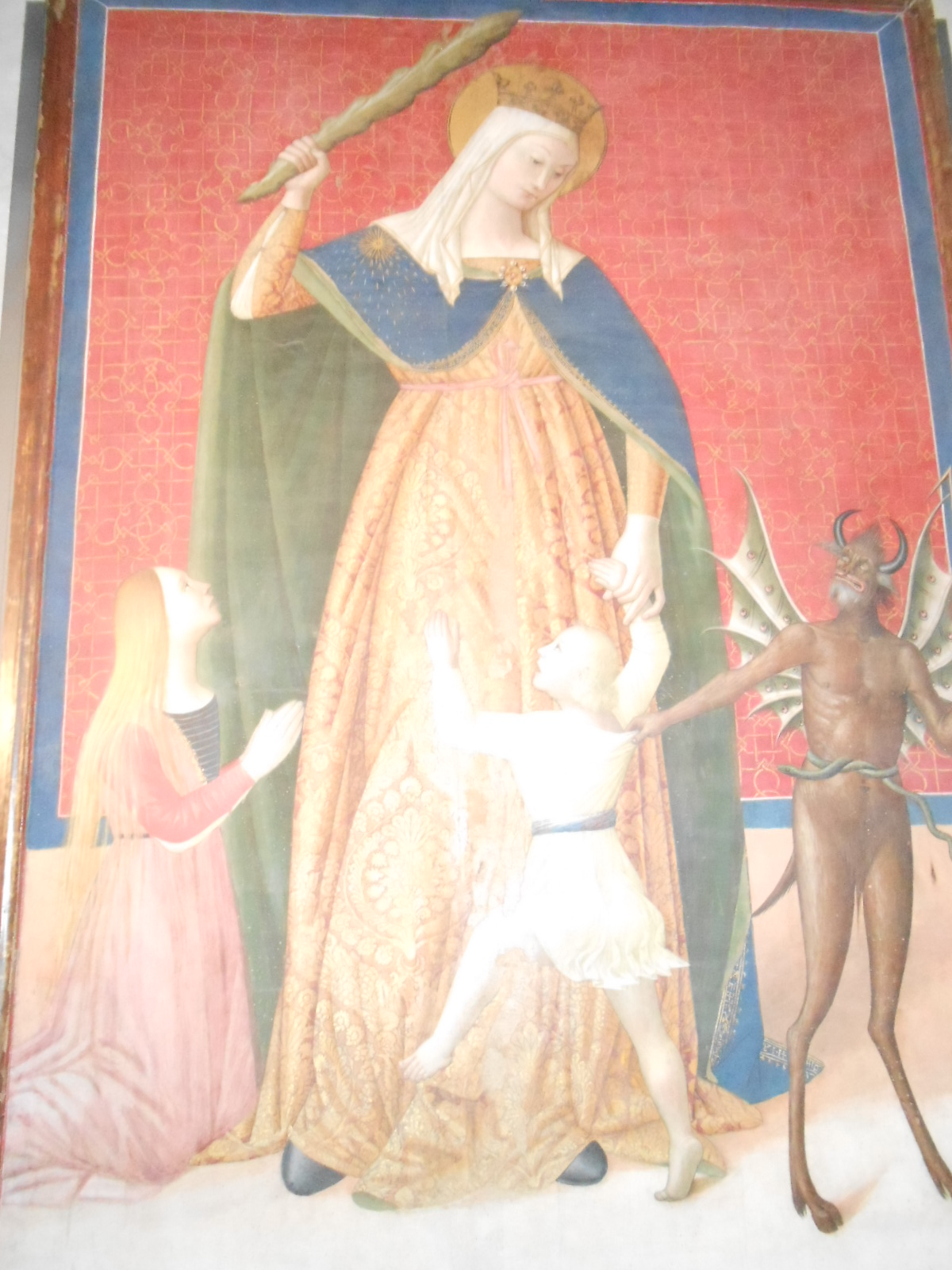
Madonna del Soccorso

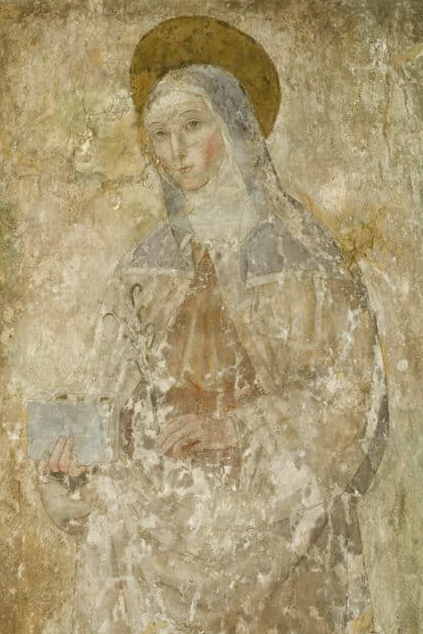
Tiberio of Assisi, Saint Clare of Assisi (early 16th c)

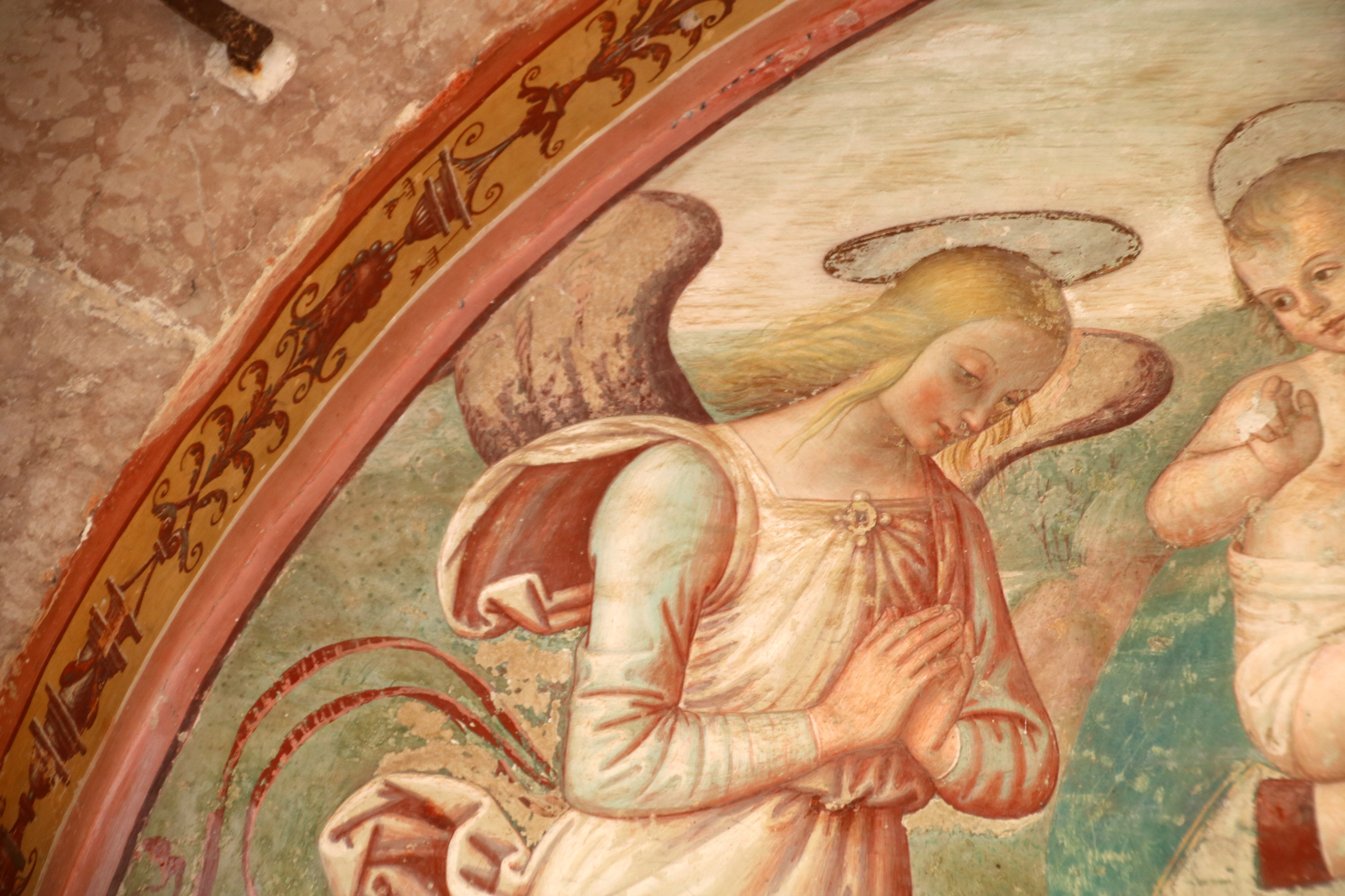
Adoring angel

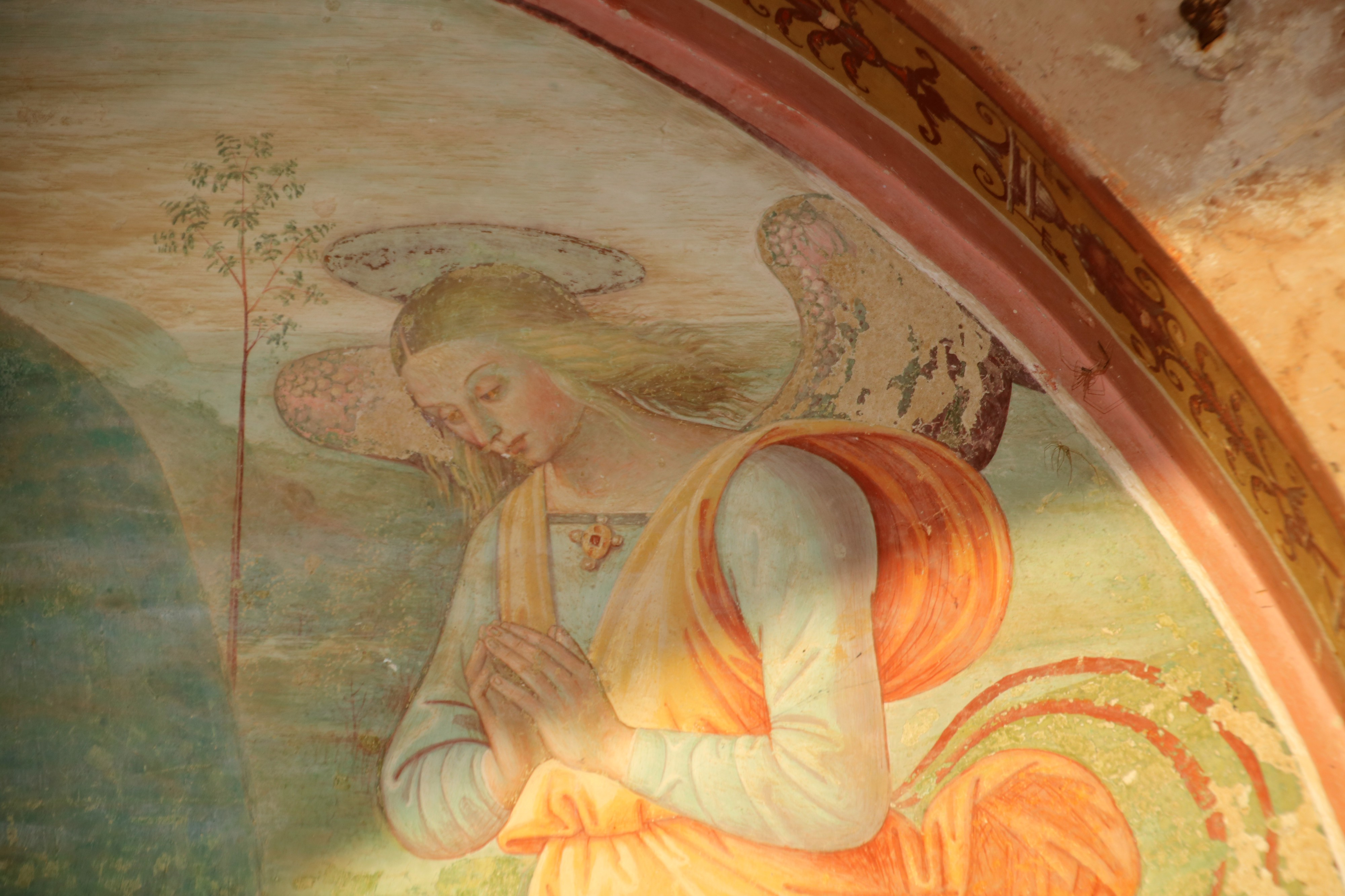
Adoring angel
