= Spina (disambiguation) =

Spina is an Etruscan port city established by the end of the 6th century BCE on the Adriatic, Italy.

Spina may also refer to:

- Spina (surname), a surname

== Places ==
=== Italy ===
- Spina di Gualdo, a mountain of Marche
- Monti la Spina – Zaccana, a mountain of Basilicata
- Monte Spina, a mountain of Lombardy
- Spina Nuova, a frazione of the comune of Campello sul Clitunno in the Province of Perugia, Umbria, central Italy

=== Other places ===
- Spina, Minnesota, abandoned townsite in Great Scott Township, Saint Louis County, Minnesota, U.S.

== Anatomy ==
- Spina helicis, a small projection of cartilage at the front part of the auricula
- Spina iliaca posterior inferior, at the posterior and inferior surface of the iliac bone
- Spina iliaca posterior superior, the posterior border of the ala of sacrum
- Spina ischiadica, from the posterior border of the body of the Ischium
- Spina nasalis anterior maxillae, bony projection in the skull in the order of cephalometric landmark
- Spina nasalis posterior ossis palatini, attachment of the musculus uvulae
- Spina suprameatica, at the inner end of the external acoustic meatus, in the tympanic membrane
- Spina ventosa, a skeletal manifestation of tuberculosis
- Spina vestibuli, a triangular thickening near the coronary sinus

== Zoology ==
- Cingulina spina, a species of sea snail, a marine gastropod mollusk in the family Pyramidellidae
- Damochlora spina, a species of air-breathing land snails, terrestrial pulmonate gastropod mollusks
- Pollex spina, a moth of the family Erebidae

== Other uses ==
- Santa Maria della Spina, a small church in Pisa, Italy
- Assunta Spina (1915 film), a 1915 Italian silent film
- Parco Spina Verde di Como, regional natural park in Lombardy, Italy
- Peggy Spina Tap Company, an American tap dance company
- Ziziphus spina-christi or Christ's thorn jujube, an evergreen plant native to northern and tropical Africa
- Spina of a hippodrome, a low wall running most of the length of a hippodrome and dividing the course
