= Acerra (disambiguation) =

Acerra is a town in Campania, Italy.

Acerra may also refer to:

== People with the surname ==
- Angelo Thomas Acerra, Roman Catholic bishop

== Other uses ==
- Acerra (incense box), an Ancient Roman sacrificial incense box
- Acerra (moth), a moth genus

== See also ==
- Acera, a town in the Province of Perugia
