= Spina Nuova =

- Frazione
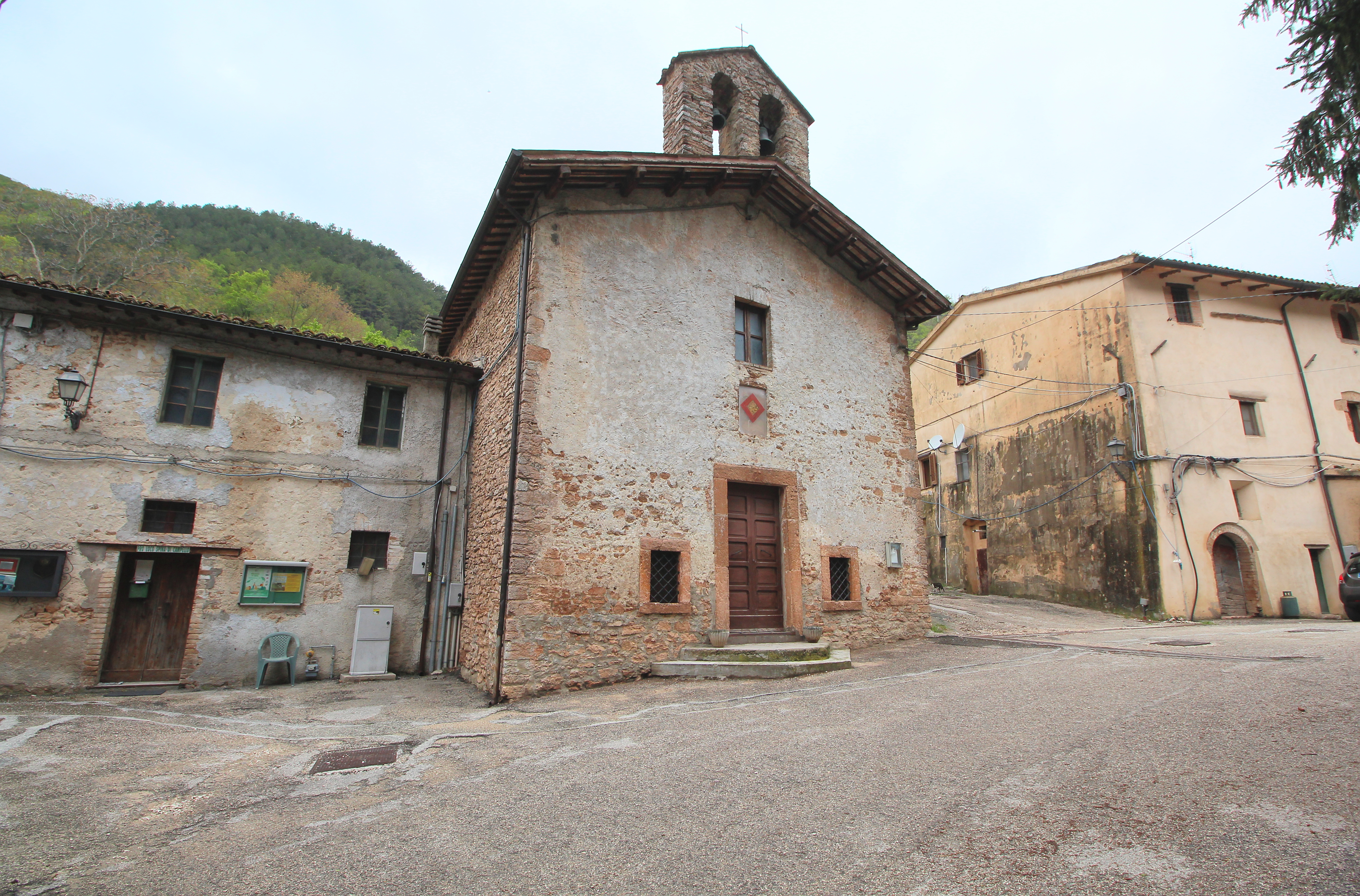
- Spina Nuova

- Location within Italy
- Coordinates: 42°51′27″N 12°50′36″E
- Country: Italy
- Region: Umbria
- Province: Perugia
- Comune: Campello sul Clitunno
- Elevation: 885 m (2,904 ft)

Population (2001)
  - Total: 33
- Time zone: UTC+1 (CET)
  - Summer (DST): UTC+2 (CEST)
- Postcode: 06042
- Area code: 0743

Spina Nuova is a frazione of the comune of Campello sul Clitunno in the Province of Perugia, Umbria, central Italy. It stands at an elevation of 885 meters above sea level. At the time of the Istat census of 2001, it had 33 inhabitants.

== Geography ==
Spina is named after the nearby Mount Spina. The settlement lies in a valley. The prevailing wind is from the north, and the climate is described as rather cold. Drinking water comes from a nearby spring.

In the mid-19th century, the surrounding territory extended over 489 tavole (a historical land measure). The nearest woodlands are known as Carpegna and Trecchia.

Spina lies approximately 2 miles from Agliano, 3 miles from Pettino, and 8 miles from Acera and Comoro.

== Demographics ==
In 1859, Spina had a population of 82 inhabitants, living in 18 households and 18 houses. The residents were predominantly shepherds and generally poor.

Marriage was infrequent, occurring about once a year or less. Births numbered one or two per year, while deaths averaged one or two annually.

== Economy ==
The local economy in the mid-19th century was primarily pastoral, with most inhabitants working as shepherds. Wheat was produced in sufficient quantity for local needs.

== Religion ==
The village has a single church, which serves as the parish church and is dedicated to Saint Lawrence (San Lorenzo). His feast day is celebrated on 10 August, when a very small fair is also held.

Saint Mark, celebrated on 25 April, is regarded as the patron saint of the village.
