= Temple of Clitumnus =

Medieval church in Campello sul Clitunno, Italy

Coordinates: 42.8422°N 12.7569°E

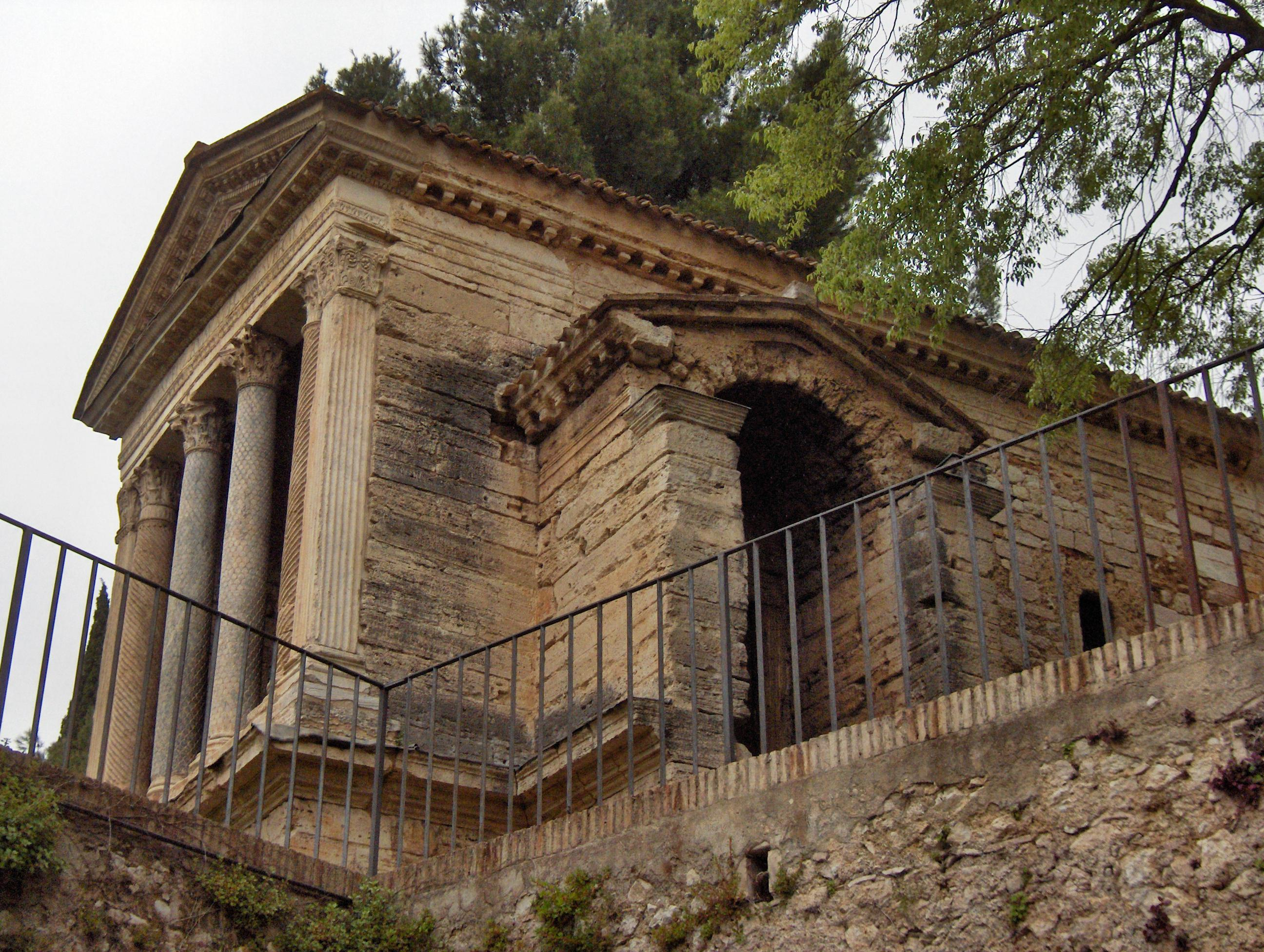
Temple of Clitumnus.

The so-called Temple of Clitumnus (Italian: Tempietto del Clitunno) is a small early medieval church that sits along the banks of the Clitunno river in the town of Pissignano near Campello sul Clitunno, Umbria, Italy. In 2011, it became a UNESCO World Heritage Site as part of a group of seven such sites that mark the presence of Longobards in Italy: Places of Power (568–774 A.D.).

Although the classical architecture and location suggests it may have been the Temple to Jupiter Clitumnus mentioned by Pliny, archaeologists found that the structure was built later, before the 6th century, as a church and had been constructed mainly of material (spolia) taken from ancient Roman structures in the neighbourhood.

== The sacred site of Jupiter Clitumnus in antiquity ==
The source of the river Clitunno in Campello sul Clitunno at the foot of mountains, 1.5 km distant from the "temple of Clitumnus" was famous in antiquity as a site sacred to the river god Clitumnus. Pliny notes that there, next to the river, "an ancient and venerable temple rises where Jupiter Clitumnus himself stands clad in a toga." Reporting how "the oracular responses delivered there prove that the deity dwells therein and tells the future," Pliny adds that the larger temple is accompanied by a number of smaller ones all around, each containing the statue of a god, one of which may have been at the site of the "Temple of Clitumnus".

== History ==
Sixteenth-century Renaissance humanists thought that the temple-like church dedicated to San Salvatore standing next to the Via Flaminia in Pissignano must be what remained of the Temple to Jupiter Clitumnus from the old Clitumnus sanctuary, or one of the lesser temples there mentioned by Pliny. Early Christians, they supposed, must have converted the pagan building for their own rites.

It was only toward the last quarter of the 20th century that archaeologists saw that the "temple" at the Clitunno had been constructed mainly of spolia, that is, materials taken from many different ancient Roman structures in the neighbourhood.

The construction of a dam on the river Clitunno directly in front of the Tempietto during the high Middle Ages altered the original site radically: the dam provided water power for a large flour mill whose historic walls still survive and cut deeply into the terrace on which the Tempietto's three front porches stand.

The building had two distinct phases of construction. First a small barrel-vaulted, one-room building rose at the site, cut deeply into the slope of the rocky hill rising behind. Not long afterward, this building was expanded at the back (at the east end) by an apse, and at the front (to the west) by an elaborate system of three entry porticoes with columnar screens in the "Roman Corinthian" style. The building ended with four imposing gables, a pediment at the east, and three full aedicular fronts at the north, south, and west.

The Tempietto's icon-inspired frescoes decorating its nave's east end provide the best dating the Phase-Two structure. The icons of Christ, Peter, Paul, and the angels are sixth-century Byzantine inventions. The Christ icon came to prominence in early Byzantium when the Heraclian emperors (610-711) held it aloft in military processions claiming to be Christ's own chosen representatives on earth to lead the Christian people to heaven, claiming to be images of Christ. That icon's appearance at the Clitunno shows that the Tempietto's builders knew about these imperial, Byzantine, power displays. If the Phase-Two building dates to the seventh or early eighth century, that is, during the Heraclian period in the Euro-Mediterranean world, or even somewhat later, it must have been built by magnates from nearby Spoleto, capital of the duchy of Spoleto, which was established in central Italy by Longobard invaders from about 590 onward and lasted until the Carolingian conquest of north and central Italy in 774. If magnates from the Longobard duchy of Spoleto built the Tempietto, their use of the Byzantine icons reveals their close study of, and readiness to manipulate an important, visual, Euro-Mediterranean, high culture for their own ends.

In the 1730s the aedicular fronts of the north and south porticoes were dismantled and the columns sold. Between 1890 and 1895 those caring for the building replaced the nave floor with terra cotta tiles, set out stone-masonry benches in the nave's northeast and northwest corners, put an altar table in the apse, and built a wide stairway on the north against the remains of the northern entry portico. Sometime between 1930 and 1933 a restorer clumsily re-painted the frescoes in the Tempietto's apse. This was corrected shortly afterward, and in 1985 the frescoes were thoroughly cleaned again. In 2018 the entire nave interior was cleaned and preserved.

In the 1950s the site was again much changed by the construction of the highway running directly behind the building (Route 3; the Via Flaminia): a huge section of the hill rising up behind the Tempietto was cut away for the road.

== Description ==
The Tempietto del Clitunno is only 11 m in length. In the apse at the east end of the small nave, one finds extensive remains of some early medieval frescoes depicting the Saviour, and Sts. Peter and Paul, and then above, on the apsidal wall, paintings of two angels in medallions, and at center, a medallion with a Crux Gemmata. Fruiting palm trees once appeared below, on the wall at either side of the apse. These decorations belonged to the phase-two church: the layer of plaster on which the paintings sit was the first to have been applied to hide and decorate the rough rubble masonry of the apsidal wall added in the second-phase of construction. The painting of the Saviour looks very like the famous icon of the Pantocrator from the collection of the Byzantine monastery of St. Catherine in Sinai (q.v. online). The portrait of Peter likewise resembles the early medieval icon of the same apostle at Sinai. Icons of this kind were painted in Rome during the early Middle Ages, for example, in Santa Maria Antiqua, the famous sixth- through ninth-century sanctuary on the Roman Forum.

The builders also made parts themselves when none could be found ready-made for reuse, among which are the tympanum reliefs (for the four pediments), each of which displayed a central leaf-covered Christian cross-monogram surrounded by rich acanthus vine scrolls. The Tempietto's builders also cut the Christian Latin inscriptions in ancient Roman block capitals that one sees in the friezes of the porticoes' gables:

+SCS DEVS ANGELORVM QVI FECIT RESVRECTIONEM+ from the main west front, still extant
+SCS DEVS APOSTOLORVM QVI FECIT REMISSIONEM+ from the south portico, lost
+SCS DEVS PROFETARVM QVI FECIT REDEMPTIONEM+ from the north portico, lost

The large box made of marble slabs embedded in the Tempietto's rear apse wall, original to the phase-two construction, may have functioned as a tabernacle to house the consecrated eucharist, or it could have been used as a saint's tomb or memoria (reliquary). The box was provided with an aedicular front (the pediment of which survives from phase two, but not the colonnettes, which were set up in 1849). Such tabernacles or reliquaries are common in high medieval contexts, but rare for the early Middle Ages. Not long ago, Valentino Pace suggested that the box in question stands at the focus of the Tempietto's sculptural and fresco decoration, and that it could well have featured a cross relic.

== Sources ==
- Pliny the Younger, Letters, VIII, 8
- Virgil, Georgics,
- Emerick, Judson (1998). __The Tempietto del Clitunno near Spoleto__ (University Park, PA: Penn State Press).
- Jaggi, Carola (1998). __San Salvatore in Spoleto__ (Wiesbaden: Reichert), especially pp. 149 ff.
- Pace, Valentino (2003). "Immanenza dell'antico, congiunzioni romane e traiettorie Europee: Aspetti dell'arte longobarda in Umbria e in Campania," in Atti del XVI Congresso, Centro Italiano di Studi sull'Alto Medioevo: __I longobardi dei ducati di Spoleto e Benevento__ (Spoleto), pp. 1125–48.
- Emerick, Judson (2014). "The Tempietto del Clitunno and San Salvatore near Spoleto: Ancient Roman Imperial Columnar Display in Medieval Contexts" in __Tributes to Pierre du Prey, Architecture and the Classical Tradition, from Pliny to Posterity__, ed. M. Reeve (London and Turnhout: Brepols/Harvey Miller), chap. 3, pp. 41–71.
