= Pietro Bonilli =

Italian Roman Catholic priest

Blessed Pietro Bonilli
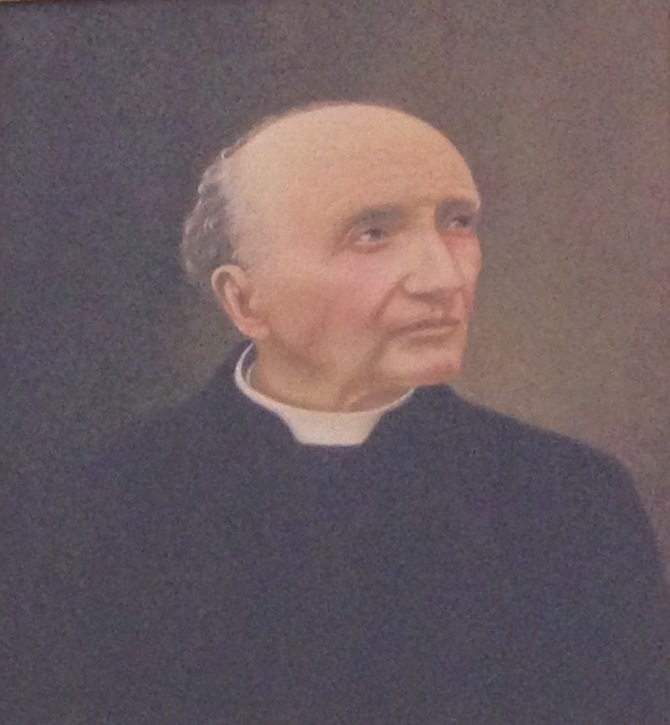
- Portrait in Spoleto.

Priest
- Born: 15 March 1841; San Lorenzo di Trevi, Perugia district, Papal States
- Died: 5 January 1935 (aged 93); Spoleto, Perugia, Kingdom of Italy
- Resting place: S. Michele in Cannaiola di Trevi
- Venerated in: Roman Catholic Church
- Beatified: 24 April 1988, Saint Peter's Square, Vatican City by Pope John Paul II
- Major shrine: S. Michele in Cannaiola di Trevi
- Feast: 5 January
- Attributes: Cassock
- Patronage: Sisters of the Holy Family of Spoleto

Pietro Bonilli (15 March 1841 - 5 January 1935) was an Italian Roman Catholic priest and the founder of the Sisters of the Holy Family of Spoleto. Bonilli served as a diocesan priest for his entire life in both Trevi and Spoleto while using a religious order he created to reach out to orphans and homeless people.

Pope John Paul II beatified Bonilli on 24 April 1988.

== Life ==
Pietro Bonilli was born in Trevi (in the district of S. Lorenzo) on 15 March 1841 to the farmers Sebastiano Bonilli and Maria Allegri. His mother and the local parish oversaw his initial education because there was no school close enough for Bonilli to attend; he was a diligent student and successful in mathematical and philosophical studies.

Bonilli was ordained to the priesthood on 19 December 1863. He was appointed parish priest of Cannaiola on 31 December 1863 and remained in that post until 1897. Bonilli founded his own religious congregation on 13 May 1888 in order to better care for orphans and homeless people while also providing them with a Christian and civic education. He also focused on serving the needs of the deaf and the blind. Bonilli had four postulants enter and the latter hopefuls received their habit from the Archbishop of Spoleto Elvezio Pagliari. He also founded the Nazarene Institute for Orphan Girls in 1887.

He became canon penitentiary of Spoleto Cathedral in 1898. His spiritual guide was the priest Lodovico Pieri - the latter was also the guide of Tommaso Riccardi. The congregation went on to flourish and received a papal decree of commendation from Pope Pius X on 8 March 1911, then on 10 May 1932 received full papal approval from Pope Pius XI.

Bonilli's health started to deteriorate from 1918; he lost his sight in 1929, and died in 1935. His remains, originally in the church of San Filippo Neri, Spoleto, were transferred to his parish church of S. Michele in Cannaiola di Trevi on 24 April 1998. His order now operates in places such as India and El Salvador. As of 2005, there were 58 houses and a total of 385 religious.

== Beatification ==
The beatification process commenced in the Archdiocese of Spoleto-Norcia on 4 March 1948, in an informative task assigned with collecting all available evidence on Bonilli's life in the form of either documents or witness testimonies that would attest to his saintliness and potential sanctification. Theologians approved all of his writings on 26 July 1953 as being in line with the tradition of the faith and not in contradiction to it.

The title of Servant of God was bestowed upon Bonilli after the cause opened on 1 July 1964 under Pope Paul VI. An apostolic process was initiated not long after and the Congregation for the Causes of Saints validated the previous processes in Rome on 16 January 1970.

The Positio was submitted to the C.C.S. in 1984 which resulted in Pope John Paul II proclaiming Bonilli to be Venerable on 30 June 1986 upon the recognition of his life of heroic virtue.

The miracle needed for beatification was investigated in a diocesan process in the place in which it occurred (Cupramontana in the Marche) and received the validation of the C.C.S. on 21 June 1985. The medical board assented to the healing as being a miracle on 5 November 1986 and theologians did the same on 13 March 1987; the C.C.S. followed suit on 2 June 1987. The pope granted final approval to it a month later and beatified Bonilli on 24 April 1988.

The current postulator assigned to the cause is Giovangiuseppe Califano.
