= Agliano =

Agliano may refer to:

- Agliano, Campello sul Clitunno, a comune in the Province of Perugia, Umbria, Italy
- Agliano Terme, a comune in the Province of Asti, Piedmont, Italy
- Aglianico, or Agliano, an Italian black grape
- Aleatico, or Agliano, an Italian red grape
