= Spina (surname) =

Spina is a surname which originated in Italy. The surname translates to "Thorn" and "Thorn bush" in italian. Notable people with the surname include:

- Agostino Spina (born 2001), Argentine footballer
- Alessandro Spina (1927–2013), the pen name of Basili Shafik Khouzam, Italian-Syrian writer
- Alphonso de Spina (died 491), Spanish Franciscan Catholic Bishop
- Angelo Spina (born 1954), Italian Roman Catholic prelate
- Ashley Spina (born 1992), Australian soccer player
- Ben Spina (born 1988), Australian rugby league footballer
- Dave Spina (born 1983), American ice hockey player
- Francis X. Spina (born 1946), American judge
- Franz Spina (1868–1938), German-Czechoslovak politician
- Gerónimo Spina (born 2005), Argentine footballer
- Harold Spina (1906–1997), American composer
- Joanie Spina (1953–2014), American dancer, choreographer, magician and director
- Joe Spina (born 1946), Canadian politician
- Joey Spina (born 1977), American boxer
- Juan-Francisco Spina (born 1985), Argentine tennis player
- Lane Spina (born 1962 or 1963), American freestyle skier
- Laurie Spina (born 1963), Australian rugby league footballer and commentator
- Maria Grazia Spina (1936–2025), Italian actress
- Marcelo Spina (born 1970), Argentine architect
- Scipione Spina (died 1639), Italian Roman Catholic Bishop

== See also ==
- Spina (disambiguation)
