= Pettino =

- Frazione
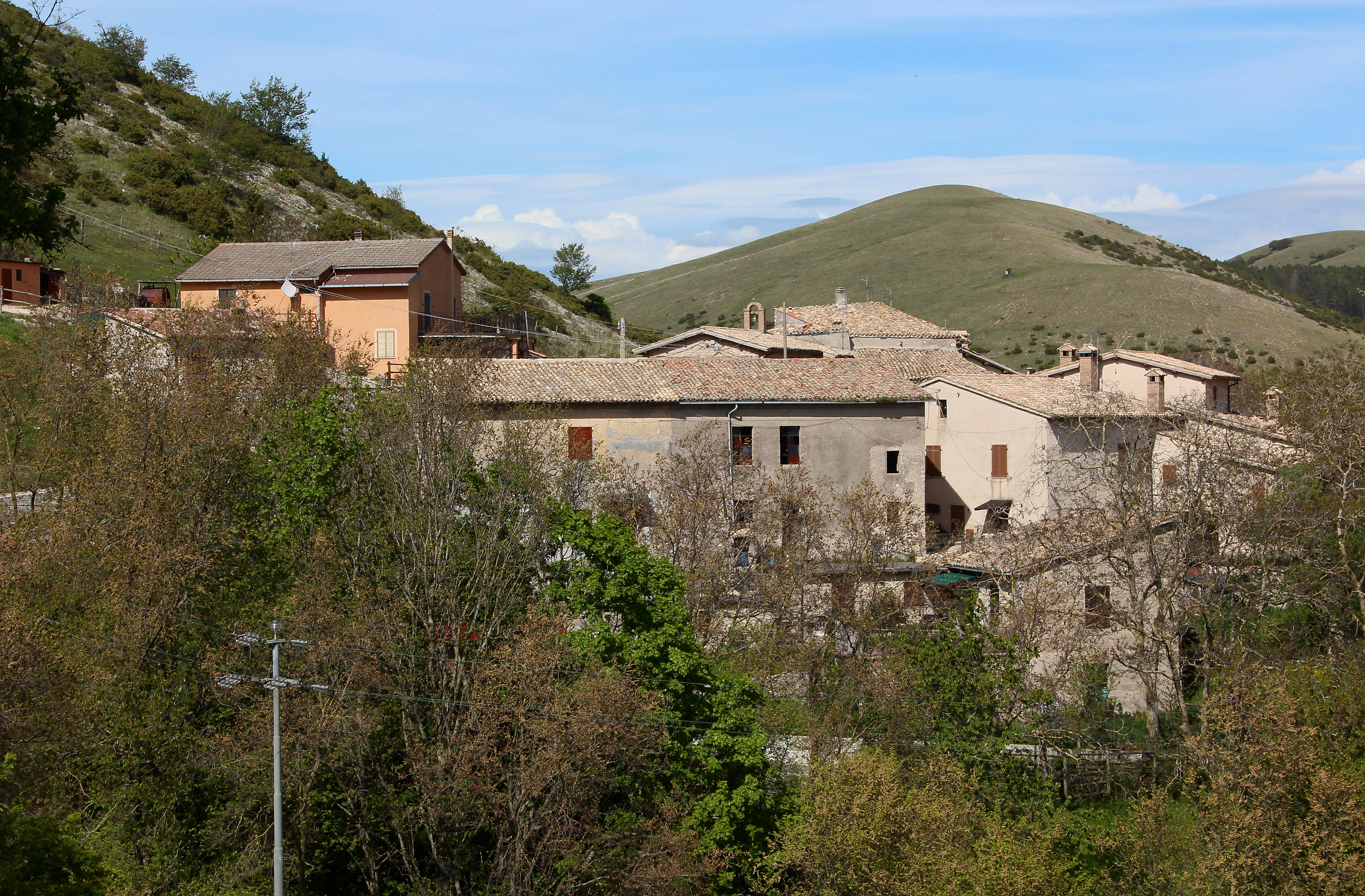
- Pettino

- Location within Italy
- Coordinates: 42°52′7″N 12°49′9″E
- Country: Italy
- Region: Umbria
- Province: Perugia
- Comune: Campello sul Clitunno
- Elevation: 1,074 m (3,524 ft)

Population (2001)
  - Total: 74
- Time zone: UTC+1 (CET)
  - Summer (DST): UTC+2 (CEST)
- Postcode: 06042
- Area code: 0743

Pettino (Pitinum in Latin) is a frazione of the comune of Campello sul Clitunno and former Latin Catholic bishopric in the Province of Perugia, in central Italy's Umbria region.

It stands at an elevation of 1074 metres above sea level. At the time of the Istat census of 2001, it had only 74 inhabitants.

== Ecclesiastical history ==
The Diocese of Pitinum (or Pettino) was established circa 300 AD, but suppressed circa 400 AD and had its territory reassigned to the Diocese of Amiterno. No incumbents available.

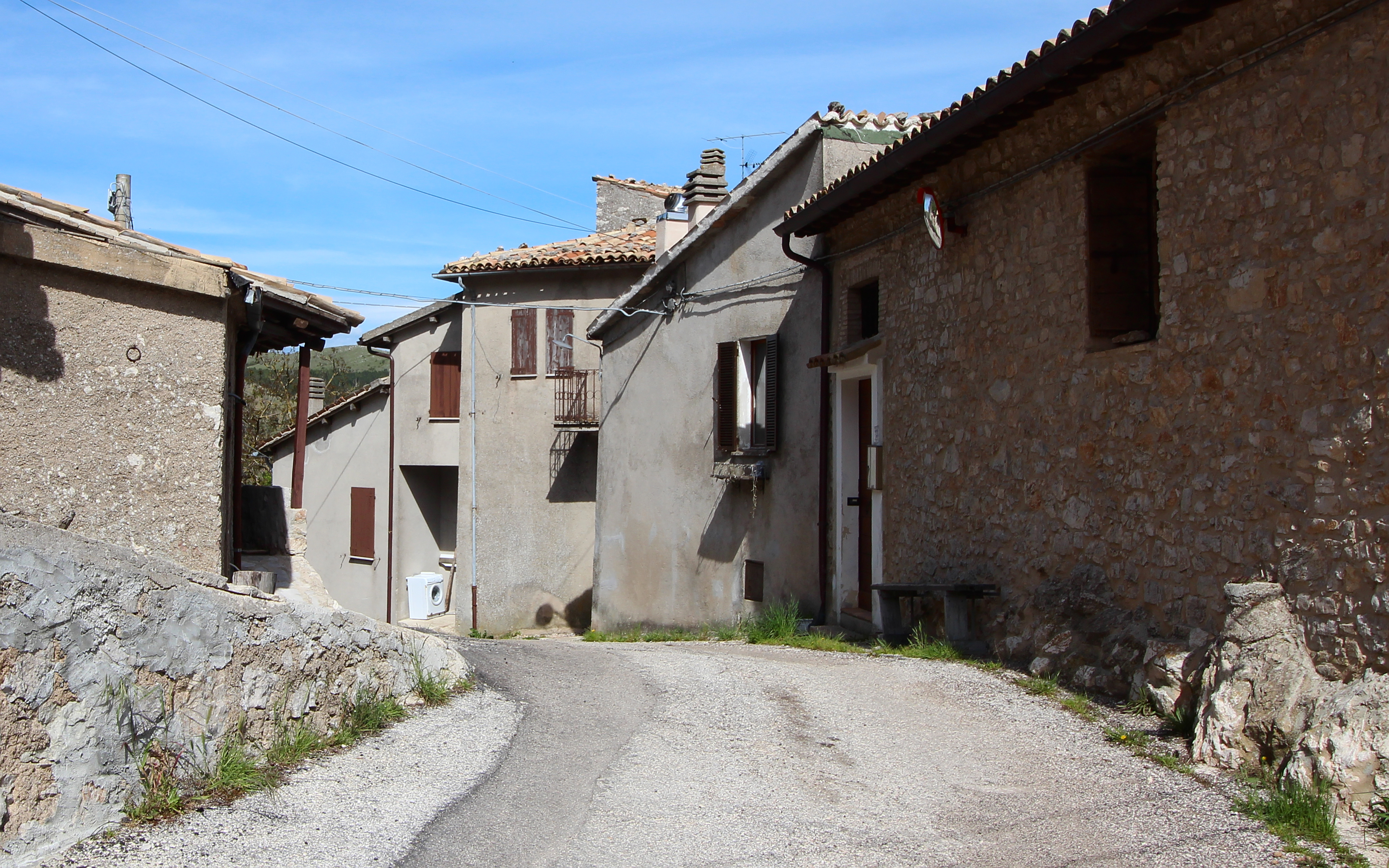

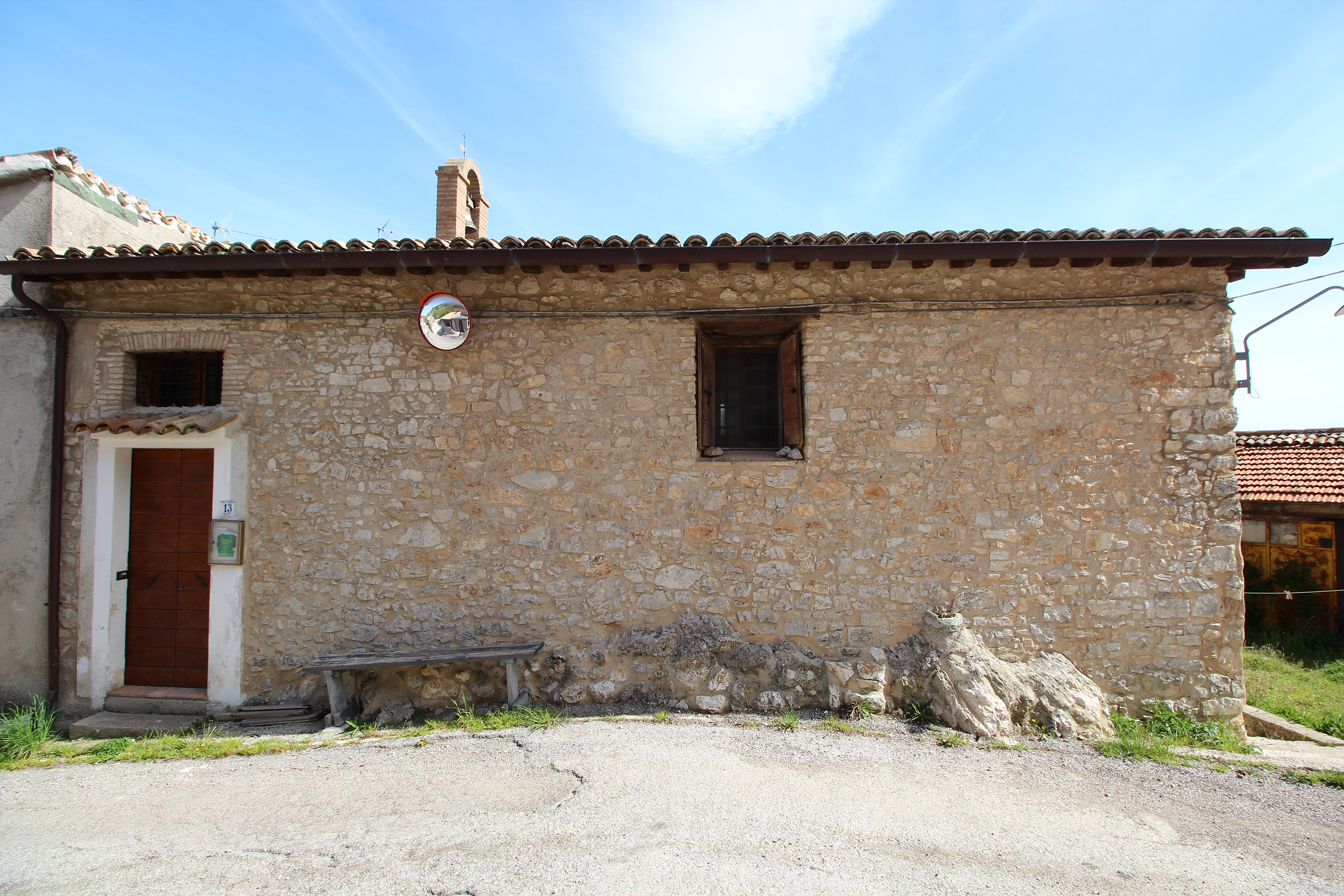
church of the saints Quirico e Giulitta dentro il borgo

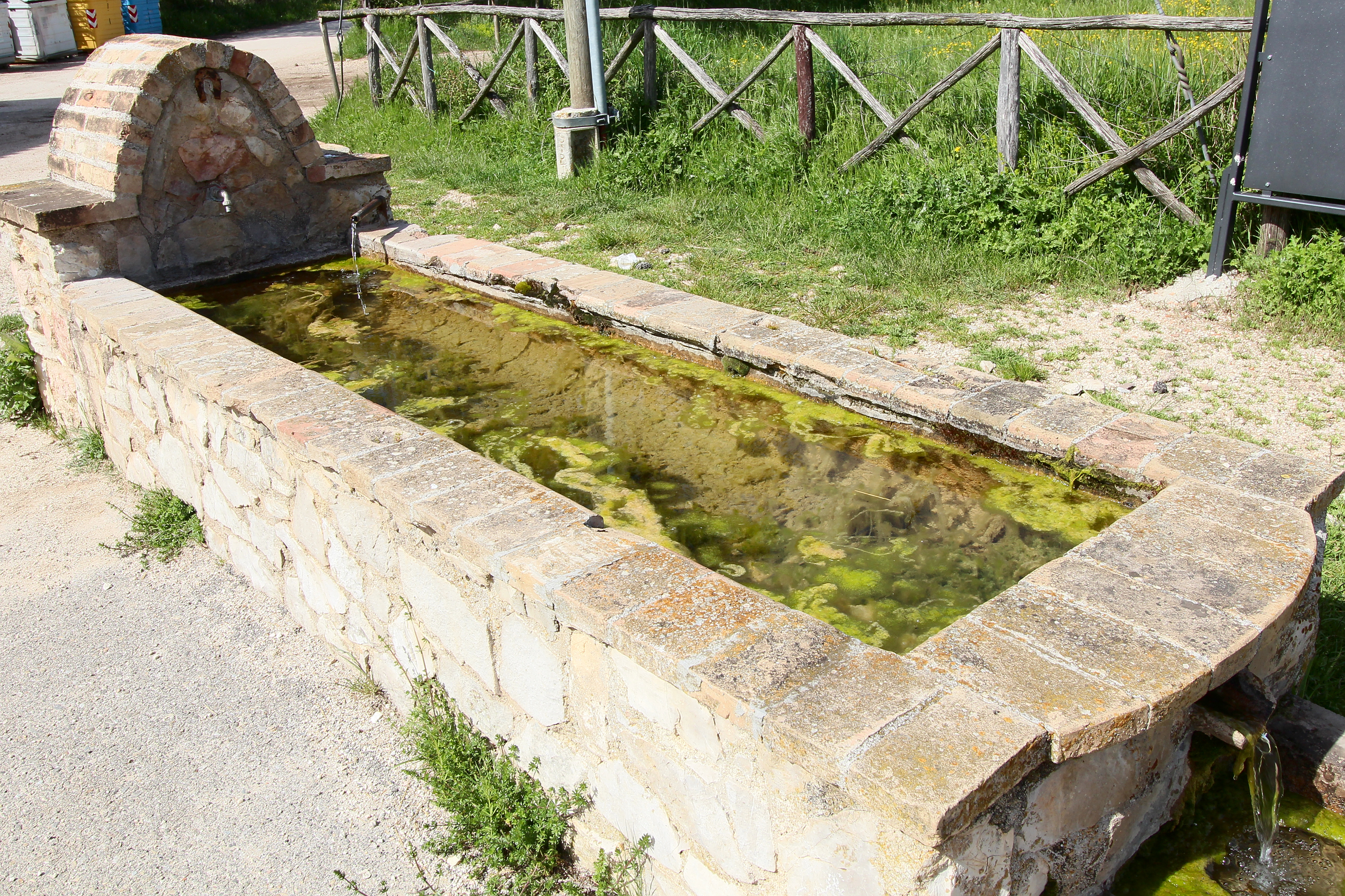
Fountain

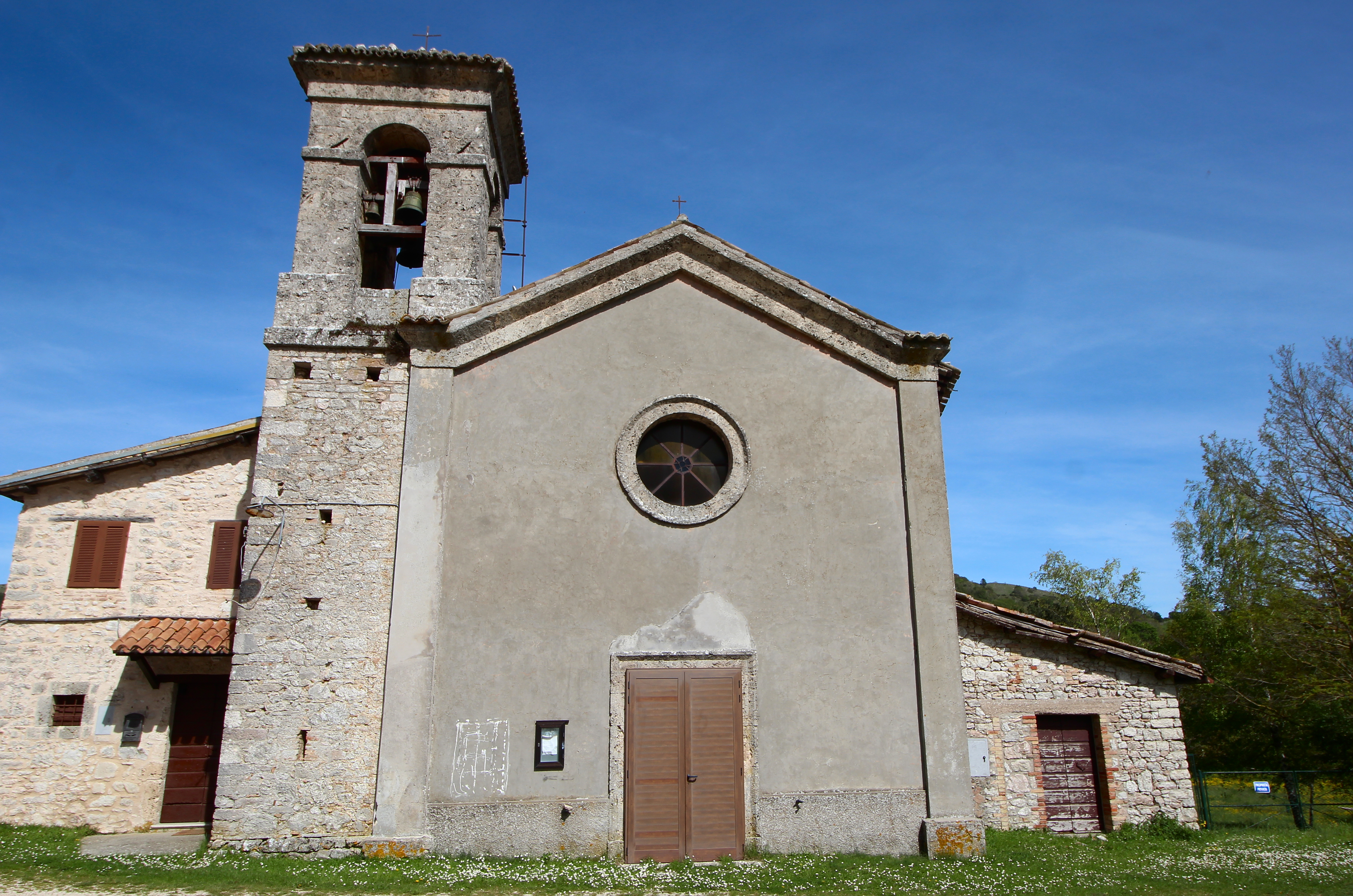
the church of Sant'Emidio

== Source and External links ==
- GCatholic
