= Campello Alto =

- Frazione
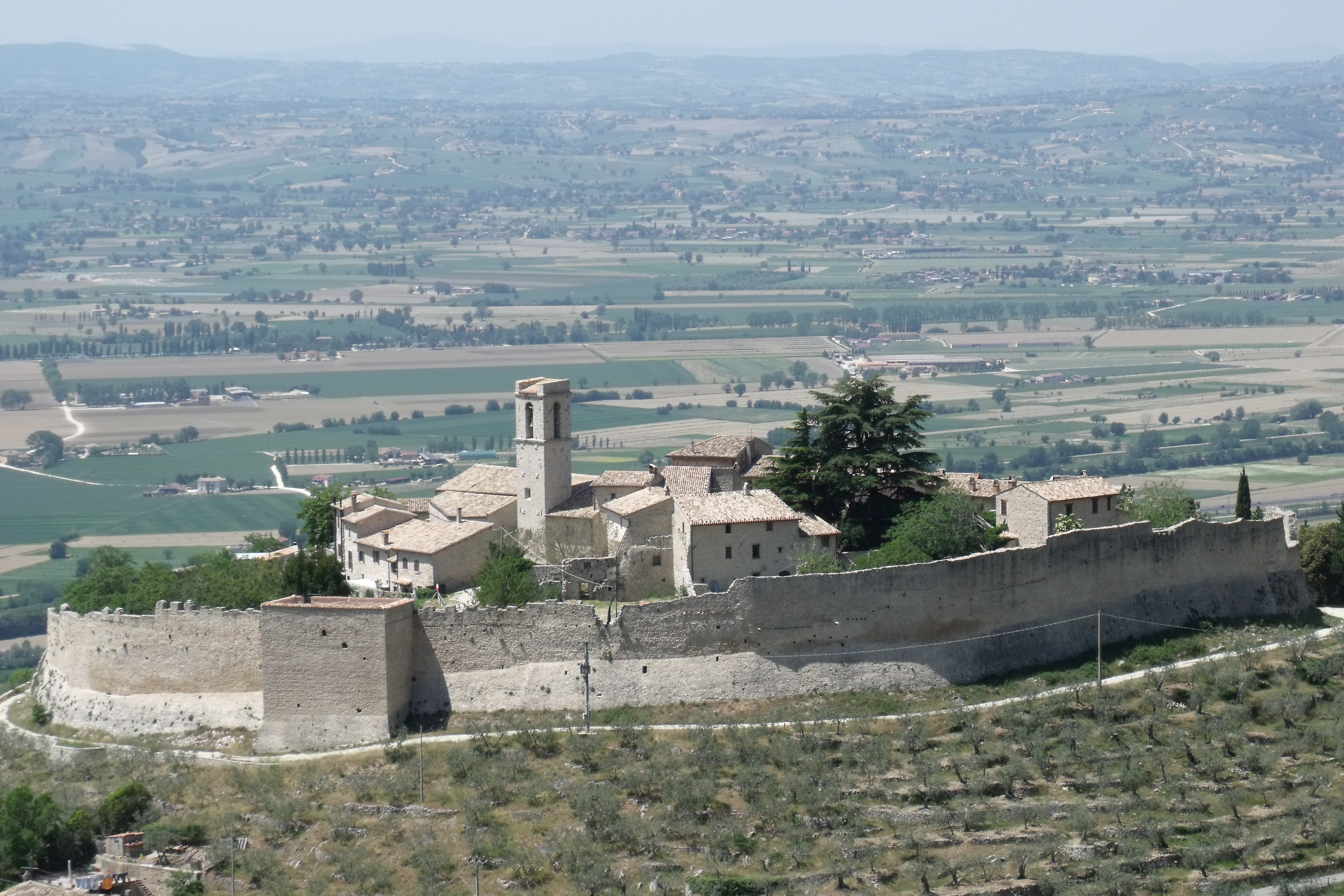
- Campello Alto

- Location within Italy
- Coordinates: 42°49′43″N 12°47′06″E
- Country: Italy
- Region: Umbria
- Province: Perugia
- Comune: Campello sul Clitunno
- Elevation: 514 m (1,686 ft)

Population (2021)
  - Total: 13
- Time zone: UTC+1 (CET)
  - Summer (DST): UTC+2 (CEST)
- Postcode: 06042
- Area code: 0743

Campello Alto is a frazione of the comune of Campello sul Clitunno in the Province of Perugia, Umbria, central Italy. It stands at an elevation of 514 metres (1,686 ft) above sea level. At the time of the Istat census of 2021 it had 13 inhabitants.

Campello Alto is a fortified settlement on the summit of a hill overlooking the Umbrian Valley.

== History ==
The castle was built in the 11th century by the Burgundian baron Rovero di Champeaux, from whom the Counts of Campello derived their name and lordship. The circular enclosure walls remain largely intact, and the village developed along the access road descending toward the plain.

The castle remained under the jurisdiction of the Counts of Campello, whose authority was confirmed by the emperors Frederick I, Henry VI and Frederick II because of their support for the imperial cause against the Church. Pope Honorius III condemned the family. In 1326 hostility toward the Church was again manifested by Argento Campello.

In the mid-14th century the castle was attacked by Pietro Pianciani, lord of Spoleto, who devastated the settlement, destroyed towers and buildings, and forced survivors to submit. From that period until the 18th century the castle remained united with the city of Spoleto, later becoming an autonomous municipality.

== Architecture ==
The settlement preserves the structure of the medieval fortified center, including the castle, the village layout, tower houses near the walls, and agricultural terraces. The defensive walls and towers retain much of their 14th-century form.

The single entrance gate preserves defensive structures, and nearby stands a public building beside the Church of San Donato, of Romanesque origin and later modified in the Baroque period; 15th-century votive frescoes have been identified inside.

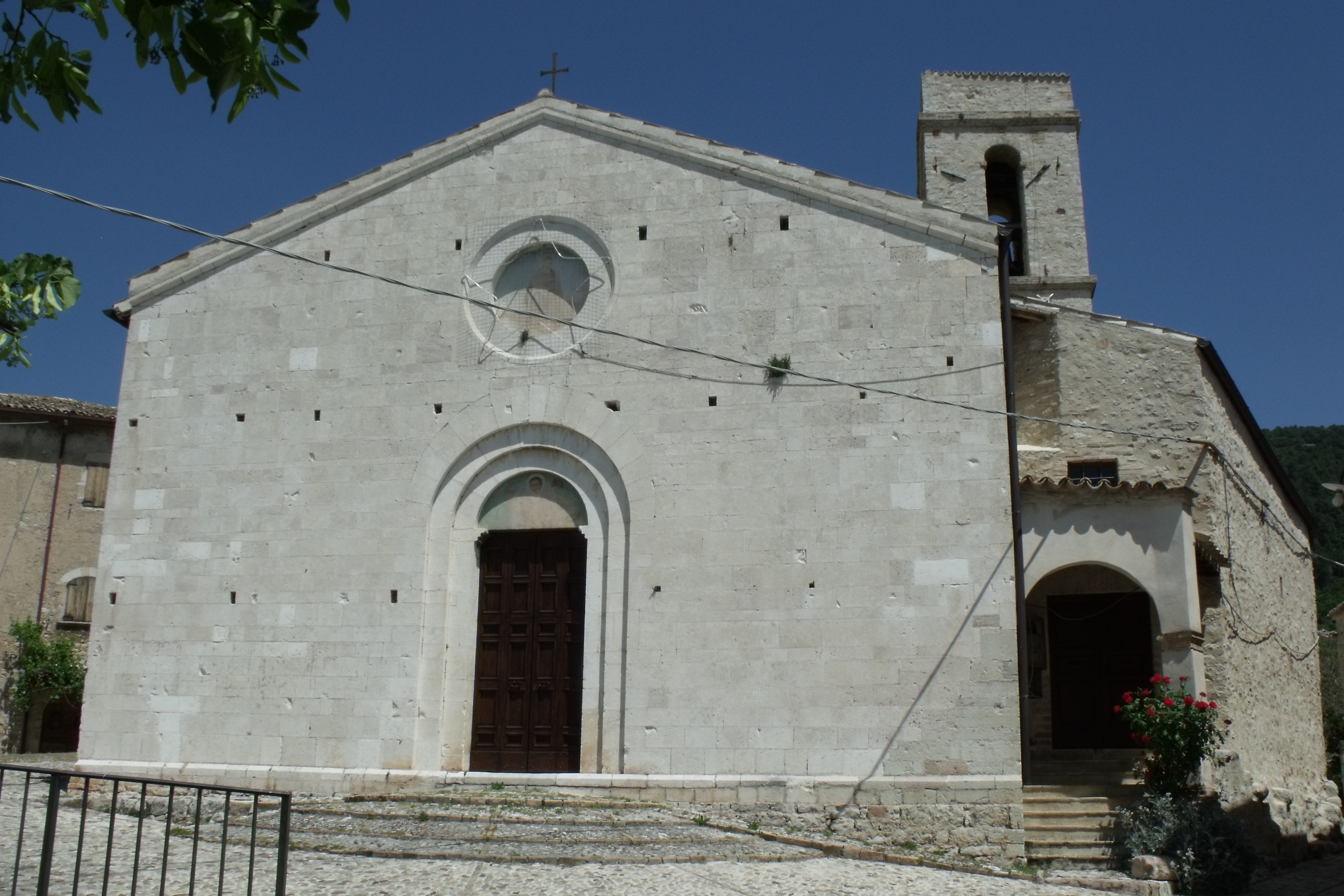
the church of San Donato

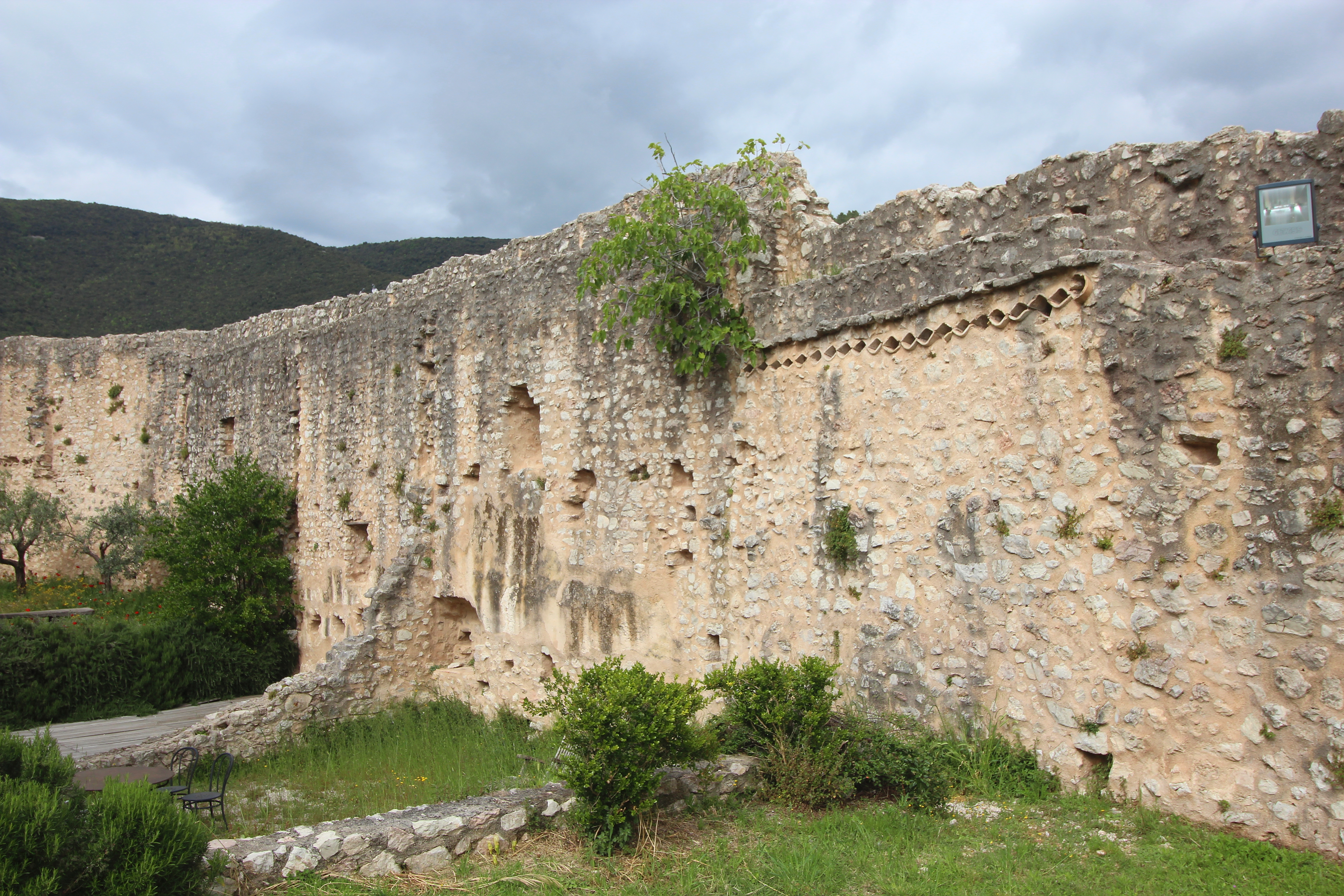
defensive walls

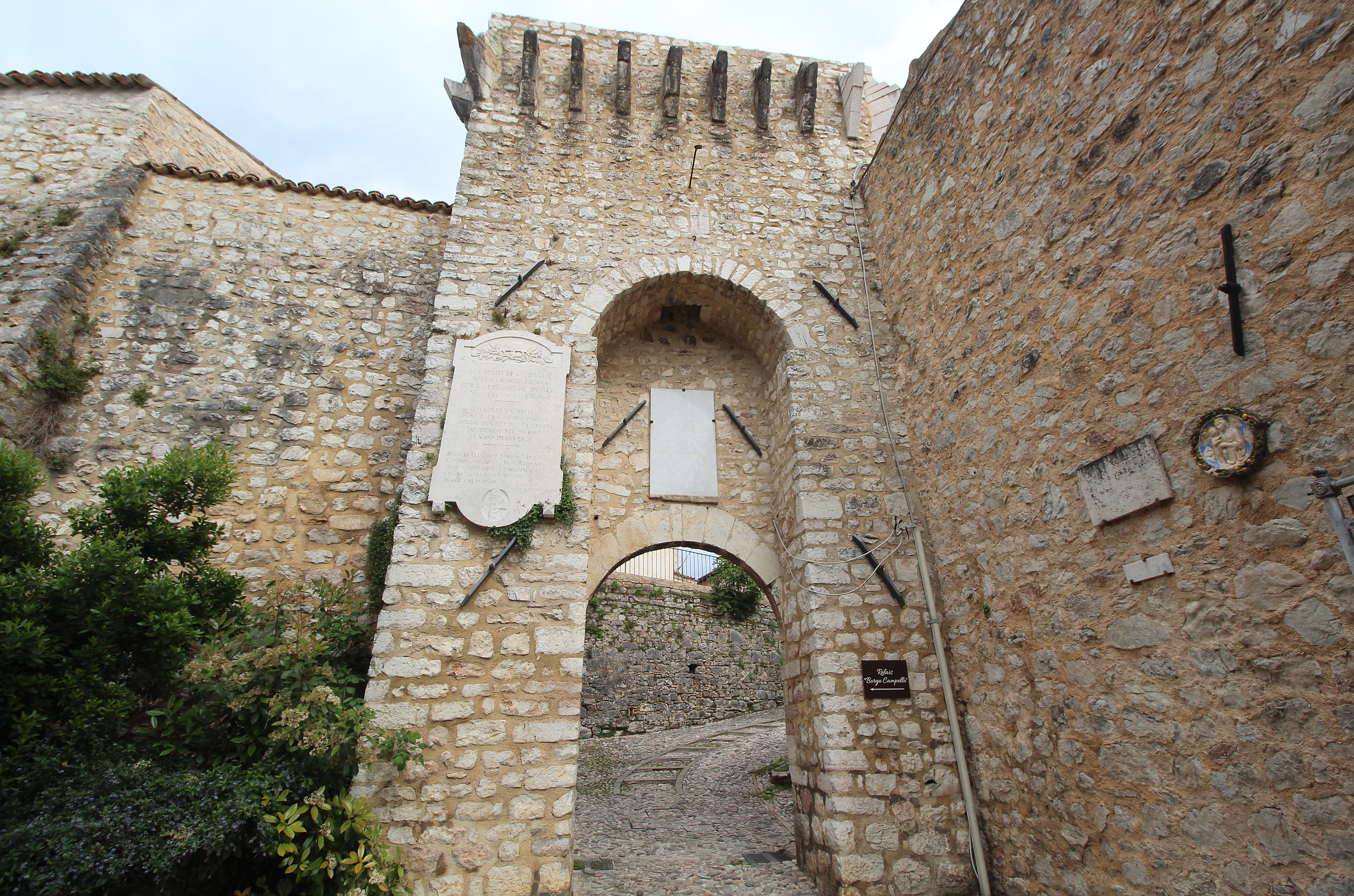
defensive gate

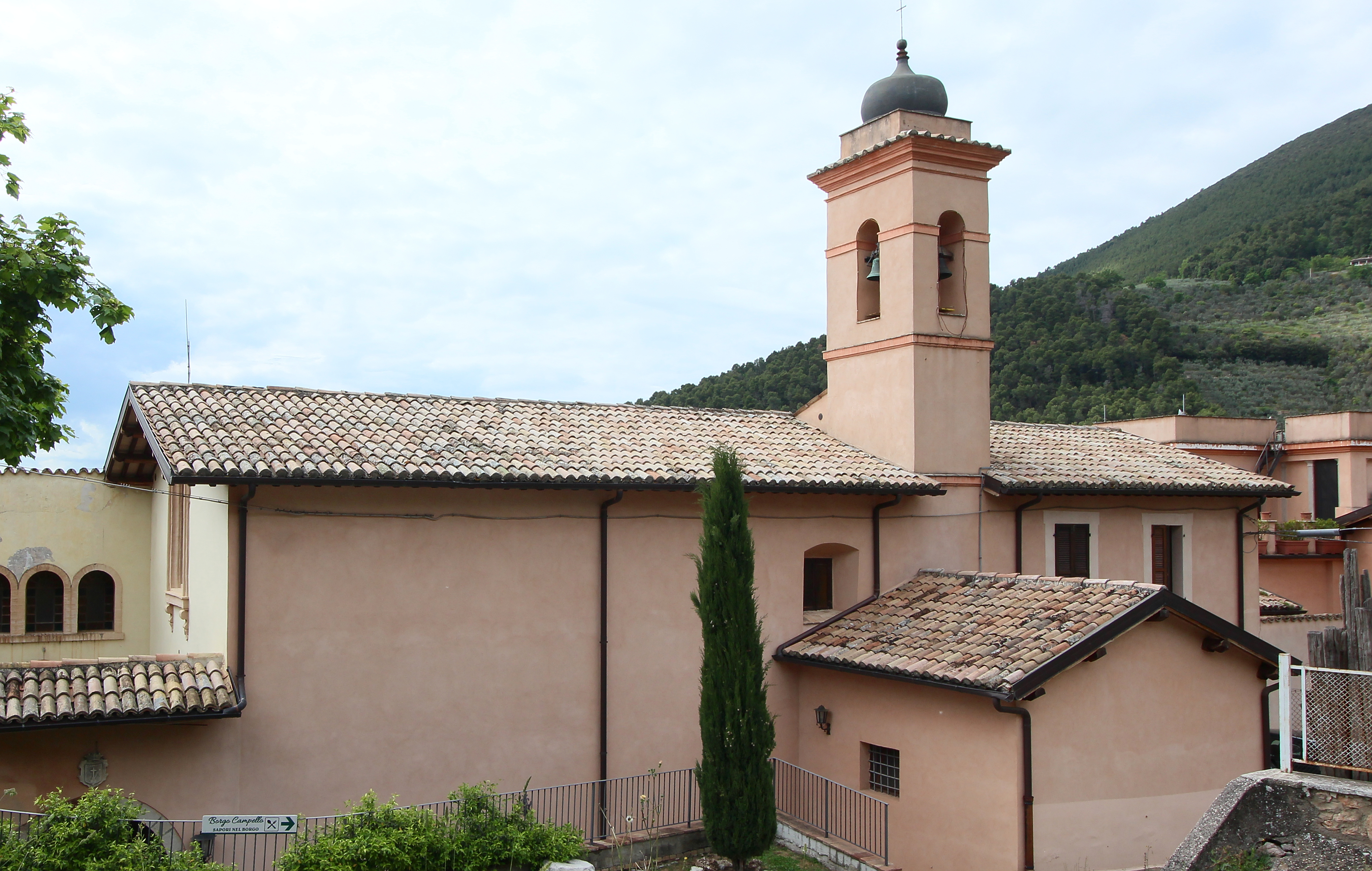
church and convent of the saints Giovanni Battista and Pietro

== Archeology ==
Near the locality of Pian delle Rotte, exploration of a natural cavity revealed coarse pottery attributed to the early and middle phases of the Bronze Age, approximately between the 18th and 15th centuries BC. The vessels, found crushed under the soil, suggest ritual use of the cave.
