= Lenano =

- Frazione
- Location within Italy
- Coordinates: 42°49′33″N 12°47′18″E
- Country: Italy
- Region: Umbria
- Province: Perugia
- Comune: Campello sul Clitunno
- Elevation: 533 m (1,749 ft)

Population (2001)
  - Total: 65
- Time zone: UTC+1 (CET)
  - Summer (DST): UTC+2 (CEST)
- Postcode: 06042
- Area code: 0743

Lenano is a frazione of the comune of Campello sul Clitunno in the Province of Perugia, Umbria, central Italy, situated 533 metres above sea level. According to the Istat census of 2001, it had 65 inhabitants.
