= Fontanelle, Campello sul Clitunno =

Fontanelle
- Frazione
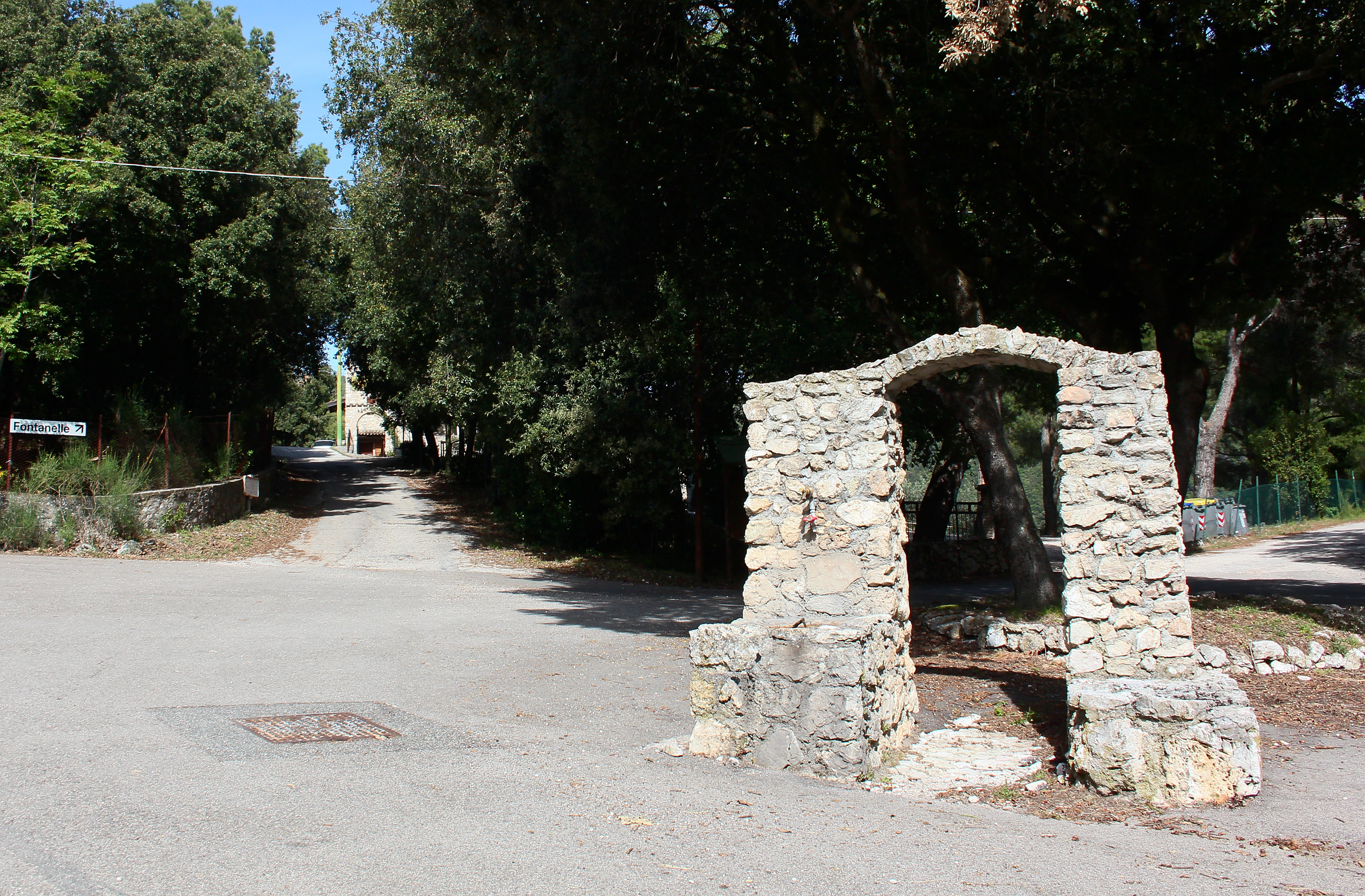
- Fontanelle

- Location within Italy
- Coordinates: 42°49′39″N 12°47′41″E
- Country: Italy
- Region: Umbria
- Province: Perugia
- Comune: Campello sul Clitunno
- Elevation: 653 m (2,142 ft)

Population (2001)
  - Total: 14
- Time zone: UTC+1 (CET)
  - Summer (DST): UTC+2 (CEST)
- Postcode: 06042
- Area code: 0743

Fontanelle is a frazione of the comune of Campello sul Clitunno in the Province of Perugia, Umbria, central Italy. It stands at an elevation of 653 metres above sea level. At the time of the Istat census of 2001 it had 14 inhabitants.
