= Campello sul Clitunno =

- Comune
- Comune di Campello sul Clitunno
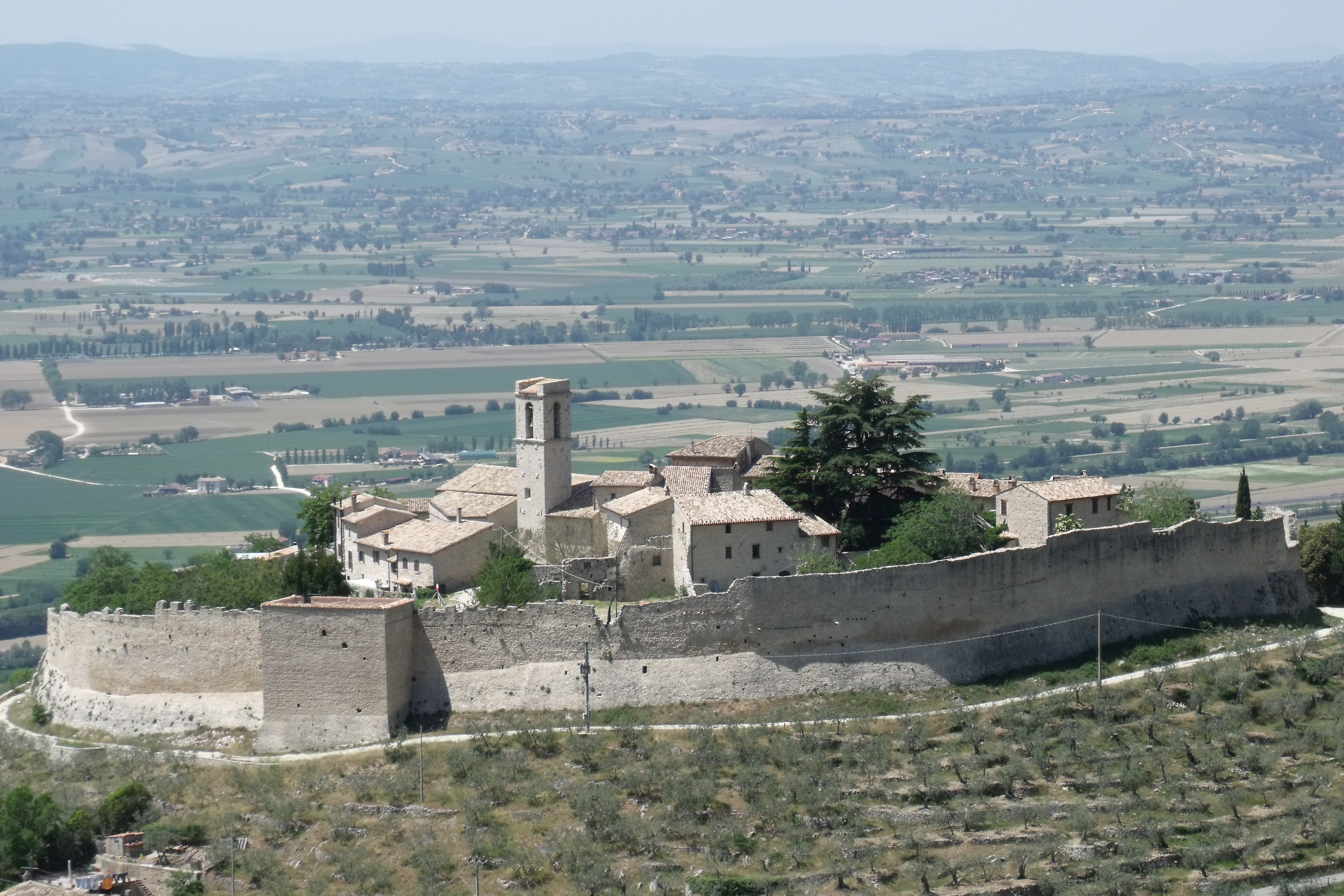
- View of Campello sul Clitunno

- Coat of arms

- Location within Italy Location within Umbria
- Coordinates: 42.820073°N 12.776922°E
- Country: Italy
- Region: Umbria
- Province: Perugia

Government
  - Mayor: Maurizio Calisti

Area
  - Total: 49.8 km^{2} (19.2 sq mi)
- Elevation: 290 m (950 ft)

Population (1 January 2025)
  - Total: 2,316
  - Density: 46.5/km^{2} (120/sq mi)
- Demonym: Campellini
- Time zone: UTC+1 (CET)
  - Summer (DST): UTC+2 (CEST)
- Postal code: 06042
- Dialing code: 0743
- Patron saint: Saint Louis
- Saint day: June 26
- Website: Official website

Campello sul Clitunno is a comune (municipality) in the Province of Perugia in the Italian region of Umbria, about 45 kilometres (28 mi) southeast of Perugia.

== Etymology ==
The name Campello derives from the Counts Campello di Spoleto, originally from Reims, who held lordship over a place called Champeaux, rendered in Italian as Campello, from which the settlement took its name.

== History ==
The settlement at Campello Alto originated in the mid-10th century as a hilltop foundation established by Rovero of Champeaux, a Burgundian noble.

Rovero di Campeaux came to Italy with Guy, duke of Spoleto, and chose to settle in the duchy. He had a fortress built on a hill near the sources of the Clitunno, which took the name of Campello. He received investiture from the duke of Spoleto and confirmation from Lambert in 891, with jurisdiction over an extensive territory. Rovere was succeeded by Tancredi.

Imperial backing in 1241 secured recognition of its control under Spoleto, with the local lords aligned with the Empire against the Church. In the mid-14th century the castle was attacked and burned by Pietro Pianciani of Spoleto; the count was captured and the site occupied by mercenary forces. A communal government was established by the inhabitants in 1341.

Later in the 14th century the castle was retaken by Count Paolo di Campello. In the late medieval period the territory remained subject to the laws of Spoleto and was governed by officials drawn from its taxpayers.

Local statutes were issued in 1569 under Count Cintio Campello and formally approved by the authorities of Spoleto in 1570.

During the late 18th century the territory was annexed to the district of Trevi in the period of the Roman Republic. In 1809 it was incorporated into the French imperial system within the Department of Trasimeno, with local administration entrusted to a mayor and a council selected from the principal taxpayers. It was restored in 1817 as a municipality under papal rule.

Annexed to the Kingdom of Italy in 1860, the town adopted the name Campello sul Clitunno in 1863. In 1890 the population of Campello sul Clitunno was recorded as 1,472 inhabitants. A financial crisis in 1899 led to the appointment of a royal commissioner.

In 1925 the territory of Pettino was added from Trevi. Between 1927 and 1930 the municipality was suppressed and administered by Spoleto, before being restored in 1930.

In November 2006, four maintenance workers were killed by a series of explosions while conducting work at an olive oil facility. The factory caught fire after the blasts. Around 500 people were evacuated as a precaution.

== Geography ==
Campello lies along the Umbrian Valley. Within its territory rise the springs of the river Clitunno, situated at some distance from the main settlement.

The territory extends over mountainous and hilly terrain, to the north of the Maroggia river, and lies a short distance from the road connecting Foligno and Spoleto.

Near the slopes stands the well-known ancient Temple of Clitumnus, and nearby are the ruins of the church of San Crispino Vescovo. The locality of Poreta, a village of Spoleto, is about 1 mile (1.6 km) from Campello.

The territory also includes a wooded area known as li Sassi, noted for the hunting of wild pigeons.

=== Fonti del Clitunno ===
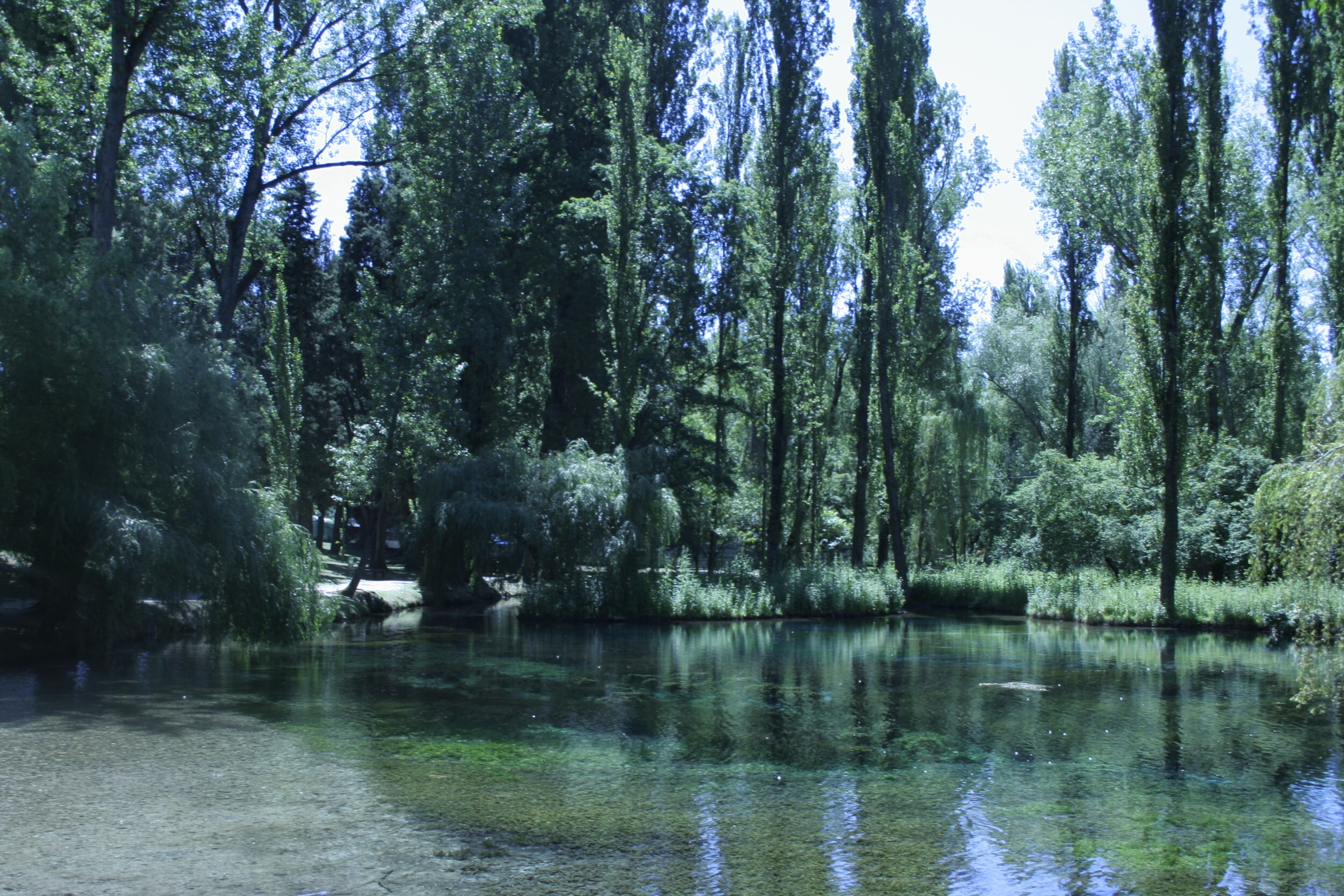
Fonti del Clitunno

The Fonti del Clitunno are the springs that form the source of the Clitunno River and create a small lake. The springs emerge from fissures in the rock through numerous outlets visible on the lakebed. The waters were described in antiquity as forming a river navigable as far as Rome through the Tiber.

The site was mentioned by classical authors. Virgil recorded a legend that oxen bathing in the river became whiter. Pliny the Younger wrote about the sacred character of the river, its navigability, and the presence of villas, baths and sacred shrines along its course. The area was associated with festivals known as the Sacra Clitumnalia dedicated to the god Clitumnus.

The springs later attracted the attention of writers and artists including Lord Byron and Giosuè Carducci, who dedicated an ode to the site. A marble marker with a bas-relief and inscription by Ugo Ojetti commemorates a visit made in 1910. A major earthquake in AD 440 altered the hydrology of the area, dispersing many of the water channels. The springs remain among the most abundant in Umbria, producing approximately 1,300–1,500 liters of water per second.

=== Subdivisions ===
The municipality includes the localities of Acera, Agliano, Campello Alto, Campello sul Clitunno, Carvello, Colle, Fontanelle, Lenano, Pettino, Spina Nuova.

In 2021, 217 people lived in rural dispersed dwellings not assigned to any named locality.

At the time, most of the population lived in Campello sul Clitunno proper (1,945).

The following localities had no recorded permanent residents: Convento Eremo Francescano.

== Economy ==
In the 19th century the territory produced abundant olive oil, with the local economy including eight olive mills.

Campello remains a center for olive oil production. Besides other typical central Italian foods, the local gastronomy includes crayfish and trout. They are also known for their grapes.

== Religion and culture ==
=== Temple of Clitumnus ===
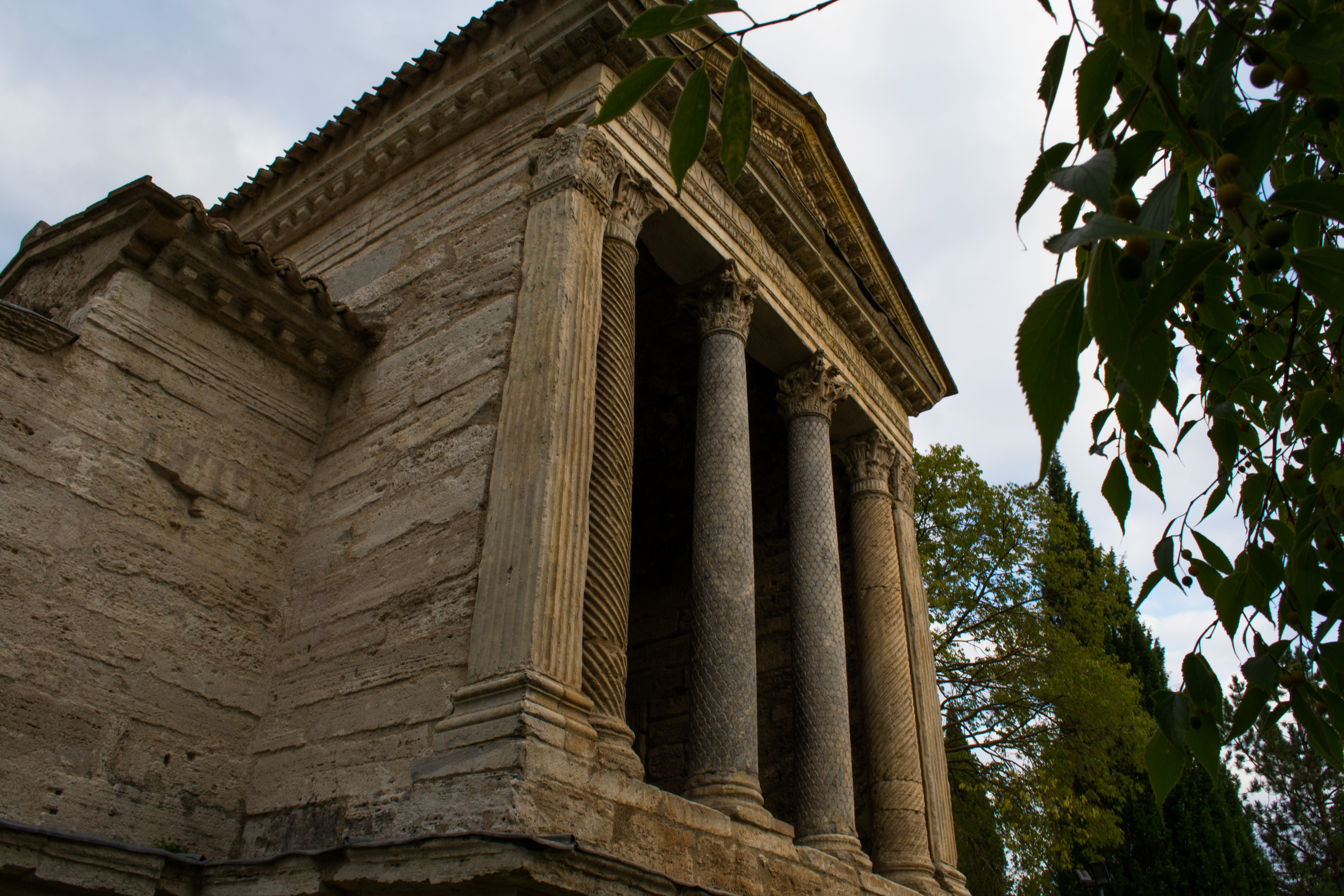
Temple of Clitumnus

The Temple of Clitumnus stands near the sources of the Clitunno River. The building has been dated either to the 4th or early 5th century, or to a period between the 7th and 9th centuries. It incorporates architectural elements associated with earlier pagan shrines near the river sources mentioned by Pliny the Younger. Unlike many Lombard-period structures, most of its sculpted decorations are original works rather than reused Roman materials.

The building is included among the Longobards in Italy: Places of Power World Heritage Site.

=== Sanctuary of the Madonna Bianca ===
The Sanctuary of the Madonna Bianca was erected in 1516. The church was originally known as Madonna del Soccorso, later Madonna della Misericordia, and eventually Madonna Bianca, to distinguish it from other Marian sanctuaries known as La Bruna and La Rossa. The stone portal of the façade was made in 1521 by the master Cione di Taddeo da Como.

The church has a Latin cross plan surmounted by a dome. The bell tower was added in 1617. In 1797 the architect Giuseppe Valadier designed the high altar, the side altars and the interior stucco decoration, introducing Neoclassical elements alongside Renaissance features.

The façade has a gabled structure divided vertically by four slender brick pilasters ending in a dentilled cornice. At the center is the stone portal, surmounted by a circular window. Inside the apse is a large fresco by Fabio Angelucci da Mevale, dated around 1574, depicting the Coronation of the Virgin by God the Father and Christ, with figures from the Old and New Testaments. Lo Spagna painted scenes of the Annunciation and the Nativity on the sides of the altar; these were later detached and are preserved in the sacristy. The side altars contain paintings from the 16th and 17th centuries, and the sacristy preserves furnishings and liturgical objects.

=== Other religious buildings ===
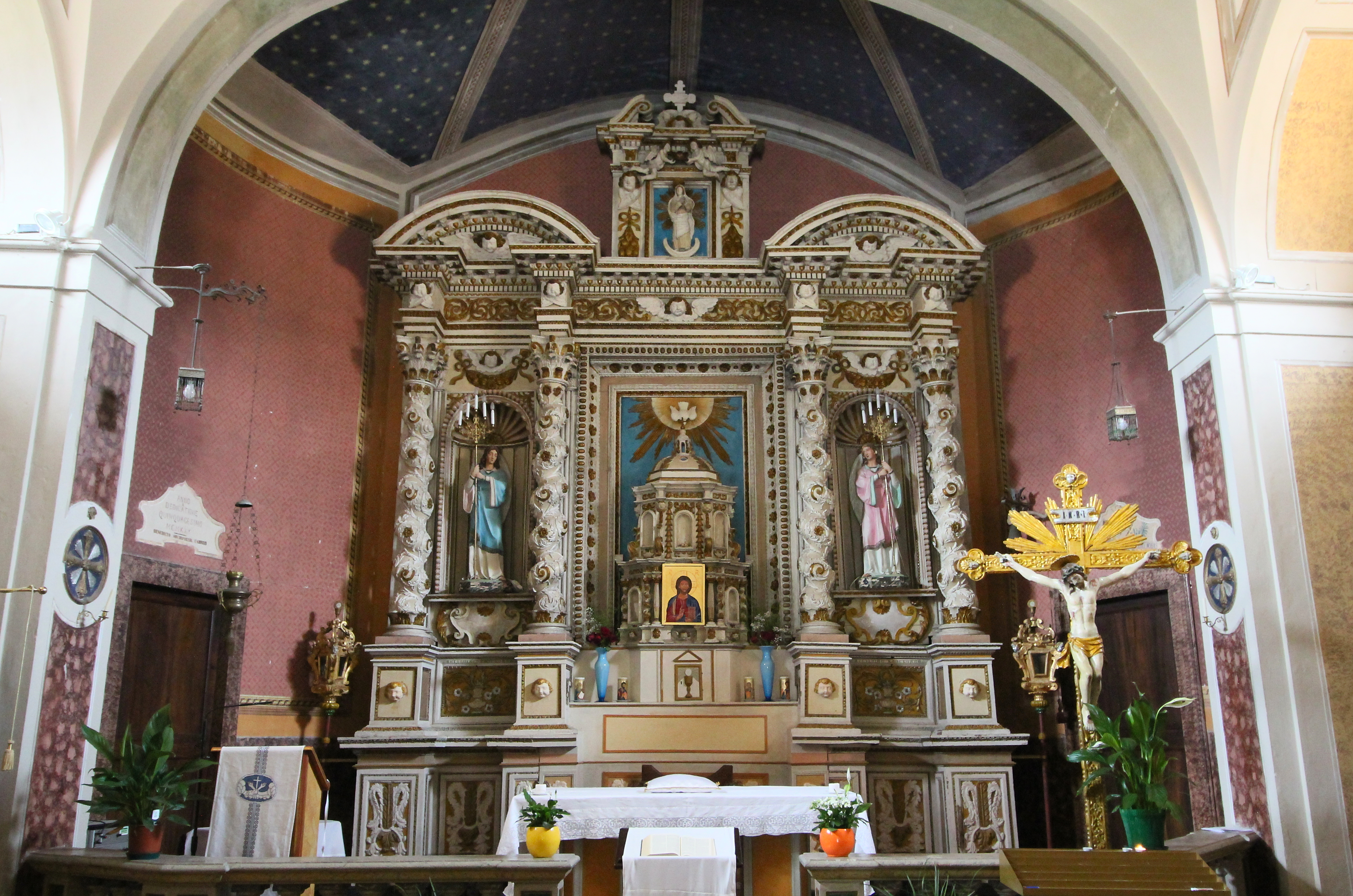
Baroque altar with twisted columns and flanking saint statues, church of San Donato

Campello is served by two parishes, San Donato and Santa Maria, as well as two additional chapels. These churches were equipped with organs. In the small church of San Sebastiano were paintings by Giovanni Spagna. San Donato is venerated as the patron saint, and his feast is celebrated on 7 August.

Notable is the ruined church of San Cipriano, formerly belonging to the Benedictines and built around the 8th century. It remained the parish church until the population moved to higher ground, where the parish was established at Santa Maria di Campello, attracted by healthier air, olive cultivation, and more defensible conditions during periods of conflict in the Duchy of Spoleto in the 13th and 14th centuries.

The remains of San Cipriano display the architectural style of the Lombard period. The structure is quadrilateral in form and built of squared limestone.

=== Campello Alto ===
Campello Alto is a fortified settlement on the summit of a hill overlooking the Spoleto valley. The castle was built in the 11th century by the Burgundian baron Rovero di Champeaux, from whom the Counts of Campello derived their name and lordship.

The settlement preserves the structure of the medieval fortified centre, including the castle, the village layout, tower houses near the walls, and agricultural terraces. The defensive walls and towers retain much of their 14th-century form. The single entrance gate preserves defensive structures, and nearby stands a public building beside the Church of San Donato, of Romanesque origin and later modified in the Baroque period; 15th-century votive frescoes have been identified inside.

=== Castle of Pissignano ===
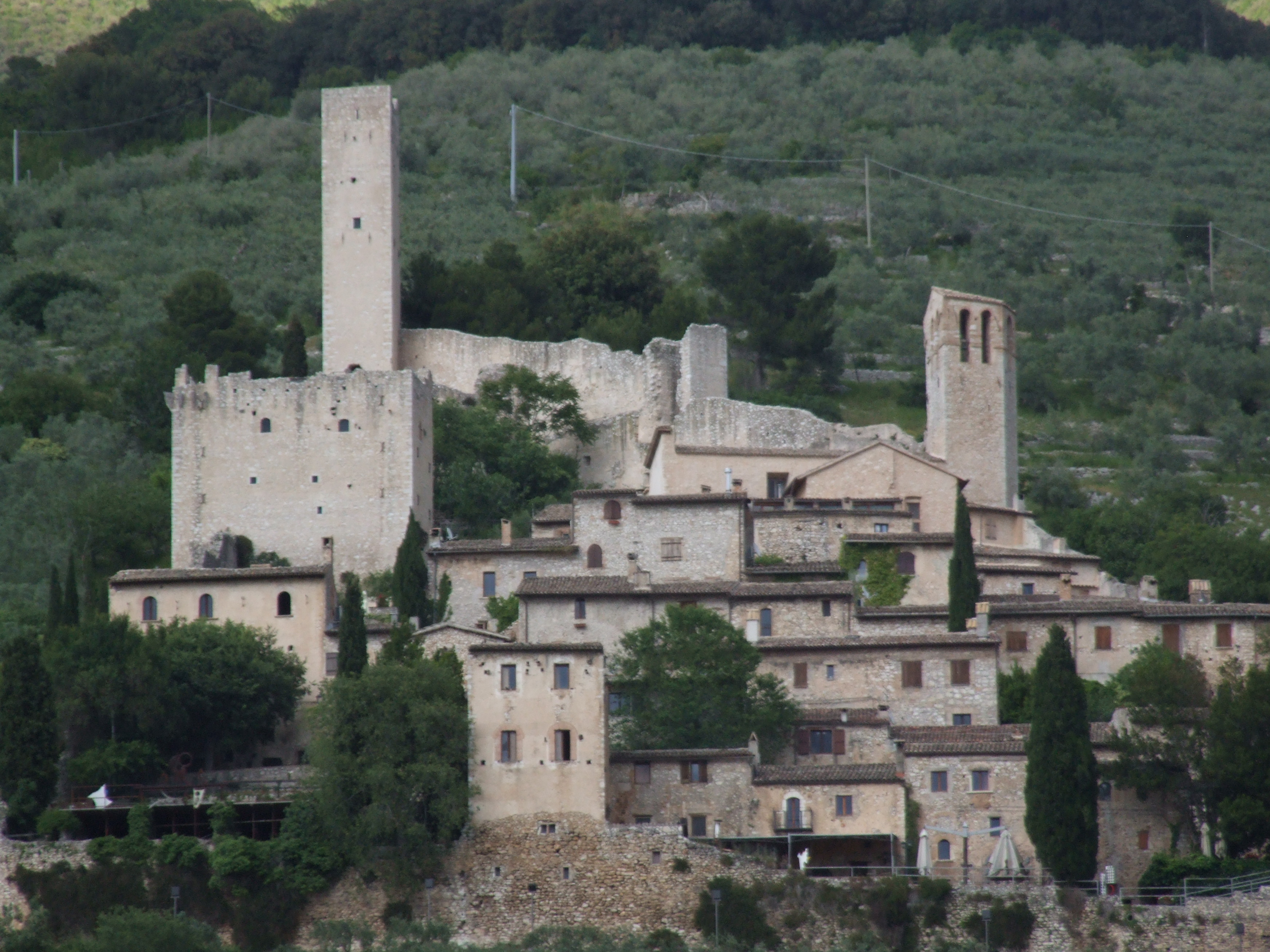
Castle of Pissignano

The castle of Pissignano takes its name from the Latin Pissinianum, referring to a pool located near the springs of the Clitunno river. The fortress stands on a hillside and includes a tall tower at the vertex of the triangular layout, beneath which is another pentagonal tower formerly used as the bell tower of the parish church. The houses are arranged on descending terraces and preserve medieval characteristics; remains of a residence associated with the feudal lords survive.

The castle was built between the 11th and 12th centuries when a Benedictine community enclosed the small settlement with walls. The defensive complex later developed under the German baron Sancio, who came to Italy with Emperor Conrad II. In July 1155 the castle hosted Emperor Frederick Barbarossa. In 1213 it belonged to Duke Diopoldo, who transferred it to the city of Spoleto in exchange for assistance against Trevi, after which it became a fief of the Sansi family of Spoleto.

For a brief period it passed to the Trinci family of Foligno, but Pope Martin V soon assigned it to the governor of Perugia. In the mid-15th century the castle had about 240 inhabitants. In 1571 Pissignano became the seat of a papal postal station. In June 1799 French troops devastated the settlement and plundered the church of San Sebastiano. Since 1860 it has been a frazione of the municipality of Campello sul Clitunno.

== Notable people ==
Among the principal families recorded in the 19th century were the Campello, Bernardi-Campelli, Fratellini, Langeli, Carletti, and Gradassi.

=== Campello family ===
The counts of Campello were the principal noble family associated with the area over several centuries.

Among the notable figures of the Campello family was William of Champeaux, archdeacon of Paris and later bishop of Châlons. Around 1300, as the family divided into several branches, its power declined due to the partition of its possessions. One branch moved to the county of Molise and later became extinct, while another distinguished itself in the service of the Republic of Florence.

The Blessed Francesco di Campello died in 1348. His brother Paolo served as senator of Rome; he defended the fief against the Perugian Baglioni and, as leader of the Guelphs together with his father Argento di Campello, repeatedly freed the territory from opposing forces, earning recognition as a defender and liberator. Francesco held the office of senator of Rome in 1375, and Cecchino likewise held that office in 1433.

Lanfranco became notable in various offices of the Papal States and expanded the family's lordship with the castle of Spina. Several members of the Campello family cultivated letters and sciences and hosted the Accademia degli Ottusi in their territory. Cecchino served as chamberlain to Pope Paul III and governor of Piacenza and of the Duchy of Castro. Count Solone was noted for his learning and was employed by Pope Urban VIII in important affairs. Paolo, a geometer and poet and a knight of the Order of Saint Stephen, took part in campaigns in the Levant and was twice appointed Grand Cross and Grand Prior of the order. Bernardino was a historian and held offices at the court of the dukes of Urbino.
