= Suprameatal spine =

Ridge near the orifice of the ear

Details

Identifiers
- Latin: spina suprameatica
- TA98: A02.1.06.070
- TA2: 711
- FMA: 54961

The inner end of the external acoustic meatus is closed, in the recent state, by the tympanic membrane; the upper limit of its outer orifice is formed by the posterior root of the zygomatic process, immediately below which there is sometimes seen a small spine, the suprameatal spine also called the spine of Henle, situated at the upper and posterior part of the orifice.
