= Clitunno =

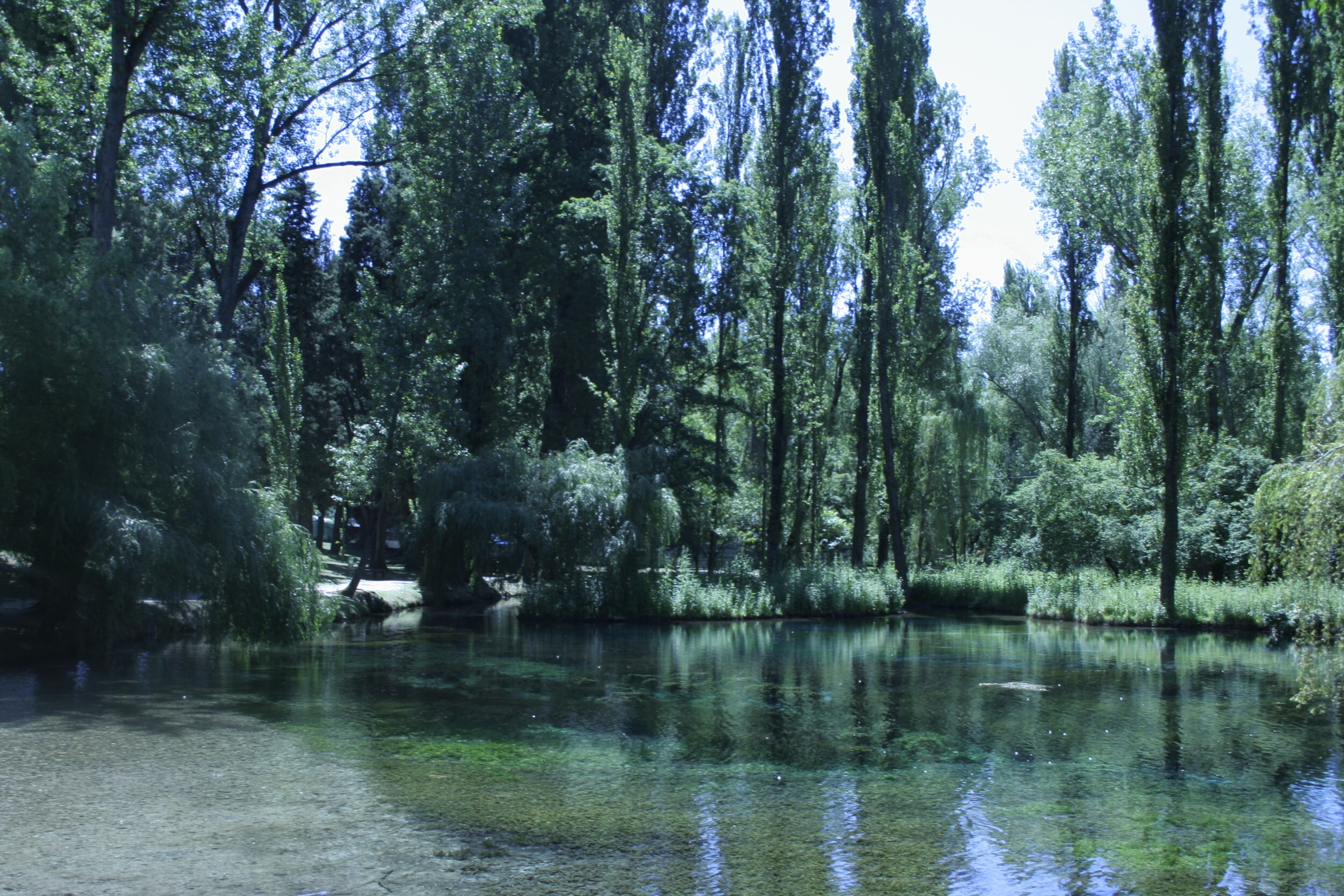
- Source of the Clitunno near Campello sul Clitunno

Location
- Country: Umbria, Italy

Physical characteristics
- Source
  - location: 42.825,12.766667
- Mouth: Timia
  - location: Bevagna

Basin features
- Progression: Timia→ Topino→ Chiascio→ Tiber→ Tyrrhenian Sea

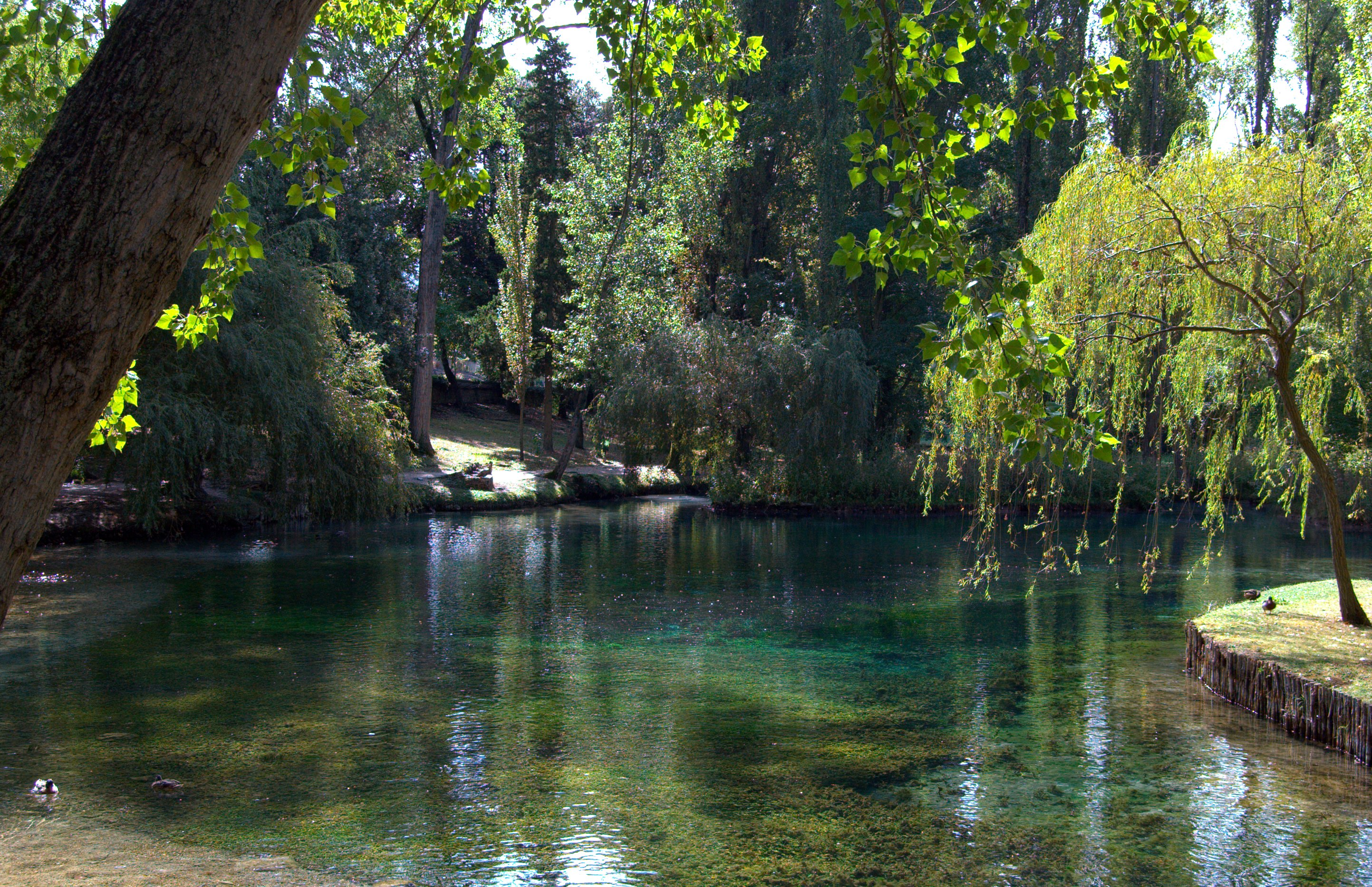

The Clitunno, in Antiquity the Clitumnus, is a river in Umbria, Italy. The name is of uncertain origin, but it was also borne by the river god. The Clitunno rises from a spring within a dozen metres of the ancient Via Flaminia near the town of Campello sul Clitunno between Spoleto and Trevi.

The spring was well described by Pliny the Younger who records his visit toward the end of the first century AD:

"The people of Hispellum, to whom the place was made over as a free gift by Augustus, have provided a public bath and accommodation; there are also some villas standing on the river bank, whose owners were attracted by the charming scenery. In a word, there is nothing there but what will delight you, for you may study and read the numerous inscriptions in praise of the spring and the deity which have been placed upon every column and every wall"

Virgil mentions the site too in Book II of his Georgics where he celebrates ". . . the milk-white herds of the Clitumnus, those bulls that often bathed in the river's sacred stream, the noblest of the victims Romans sacrifice at their triumphs . . ."

It was visited by Caligula and by the emperor Honorius. It was also celebrated as a great beauty spot by Byron and Giosuè Carducci; in the 19th century it was planted with willows, and zealously monitored for pollution. It is open today as a paying tourist attraction.

The Clitunno then flows, generally north, through the east Umbrian plain, past the church of the so-called Temple of Clitumnus and the towns of Pissignano, Cannaiola and Trevi, to join the Timia, a tributary of the Topino, near Bevagna. Though its current is usually sluggish, it is subject, like many other rivers in the east Umbrian plain, to sudden flooding. It was only tamed completely in the 19th century, and is largely banked by levees.

The Temple of Clitumnus, later a church, lies on its bank.
