= Cannaiola =

- Frazione
- Location of Cannaiola in Italy
- Coordinates: 42°52′N 12°43′E
- Country: Italy
- Region: Umbria
- Province: Perugia
- Comune: Trevi
- Elevation: 218 m (715 ft)

Population (2001)
  - Total: 730
- Time zone: UTC+1 (CET)
  - Summer (DST): UTC+2 (CEST)

Cannaiola is a village of 730 inhabitants in the Italian province of Perugia in east central Umbria in the floodplain of the Clitunno River; altitude 218 m (715 ft) above sea-level. It is a frazione of the comune of Trevi, which lies 3.5 km (about 2 mi) to the east.

== History and main sights ==
The origin of the town's name is, strictly speaking, unknown; but the two most likely possibilities have to do with water: Latin canna, rushes, or Italian cannaviola, canal; an indication of the rôle of water in the town's history.

Cannaiola dates to the 13c when a tributary of the Clitunno, a creek called the Tatarena, was shifted west to its present course and the people who had been living closer to the foot of Trevi's hill, but in an unhealthy location, found a place ready-made for them, a few meters higher than their old homes: the old bed of the Tatarena is now the main street of Cannaiola.

Cannaiola must have been quite small until the 19th or 20th century, since it regularly fails to appear in detailed 17th- and 18th-century maps of the creeks and villages of the plain between Trevi and Montefalco. It did have, however, at least two churches that are now vanished: a chapel of S. Niccolò di Bari, demolished in 1869 in spite of its 15c frescoes; and a church of S. Francesco di Paola, which was at La Cuccia near the Maroggia river about 1 km away — although its precise location is now unknown.

Three churches remain: the parish church of St. Michael, since 1988 also known as the Sanctuary of the Bl. Pietro Bonilli, who was its pastor for many years in the late 19th century; and the two much smaller churches of S. Antonio Abate and of S. Fedele di Sigmaringen.
