= Monti la Spina – Zaccana =

Mountain in Italy

Coordinates: 40°03′06″N 15°59′04″E

Monti la Spina - Zaccana
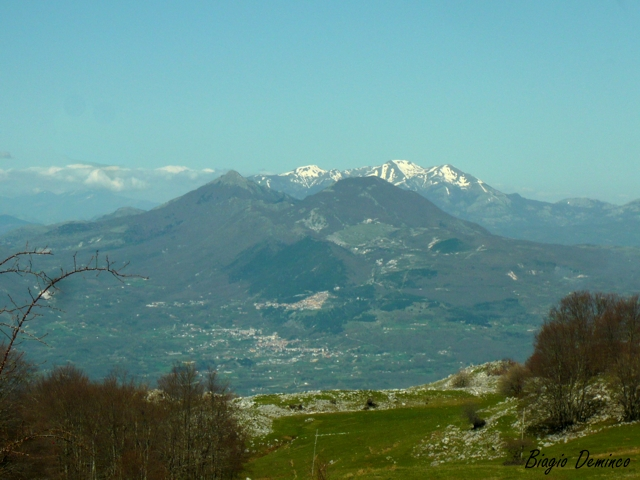
- View of the La Spina-Zaccana Mountains from P. Pedarreto Pollino. In the background is the Sirino Massif

Highest point

Geography
- Location: Basilicata, Italy
- Parent range: Southern Apennines

Monti la Spina – Zaccana is a mountain range of Basilicata, southern Italy.
