= Peggy Spina Tap Company =

Peggy Spina Tap Company is a tap dance company that first presented in 1981 at Cami Hall by its founder and artistic director, Peggy Spina. The company performs annually with the Joel Forrester Jazz Quartet in the Spina SoHo Loft on Prince Street in New York City. Her choreography in the 1980s was described by The New York Times as "particularly fascinating", including "excited outbursts and changes of rhythm as if Miss Spina were a conversationalist with her feet who had suddenly thought of new ideas", although the same review described her as "less convincing as a choreographer for ensembles." Reviews of the company performances and choreography in the 1990s indicated "the interplay of tap rhythms...was like sophisticated repartee." Her company signature pieces include, "Stop the Music," known for "the tightness of the taps and the relentless locomotive surge of Ms. Spina's choreography and Mr. Forrester's score".

Peggy Spina has choreographed over 100 dances and has been a teacher in New York City for over 40 years. She received the Flo-Bert Award in 2008, awarded at National Tap Dance Day, for her lifetime achievement in tap dance as performer, teacher, and choreographer. She is "a true tap artist" and "living heir to such teachers of hers," including hoofers "Baby" Laurence, Charles "Honi" Coles, Chuck Green, Cookie Cook, and Buster Brown. She is the recipient of a Choreographer’s Fellowship from the National Endowment for the Arts (1991) and has received numerous grants from the New York Council on the Arts.
