= Spina vestibuli =

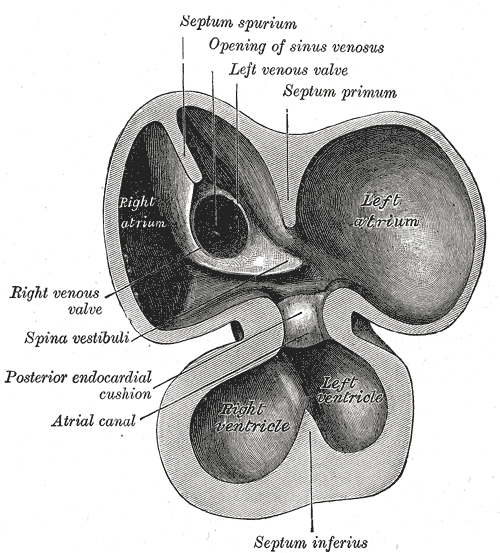
- Interior of dorsal half of heart from a human embryo of about thirty days. (Spina vestibuli labeled at center left.)

Spina vestibuli, or vestibular spine, is a bony structure, in anatomical terms a 'mesenchymal condensation', which extends from the mediastinum of the heart and covers the leading edge of the primary atrial septum; its origin is outside of the heart. Below the opening of the orifice of the coronary sinus they fuse to form a triangular thickening — the spina vestibuli. It is believed to play a formative role in atrial septation, which is how the common atrium of the heart divides into two during gestation. Its lack of development is thought to contribute to the morphogenesis of atrioventricular septal defect (AVSD) in Down syndrome.
