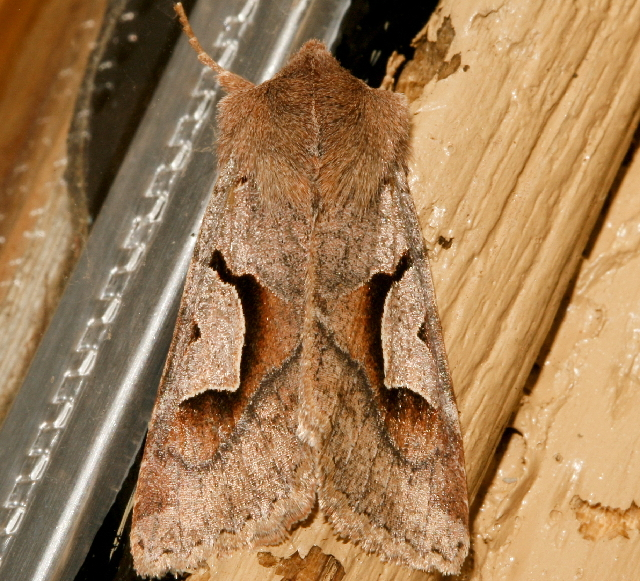

Scientific classification
- Domain: Eukaryota
- Kingdom: Animalia
- Phylum: Arthropoda
- Class: Insecta
- Order: Lepidoptera
- Superfamily: Noctuoidea
- Family: Noctuidae
- Subfamily: Noctuinae
- Genus: Acerra; Grote, 1874
- Species: A. Acerra

Binomial name
- Acerra Acerra Grote, 1874

= Acerra normalis =

Sole species of monotypic moth genus Acerra

Acerra is a monotypic genus of moths of the family Noctuidae. Its sole species, Acerra normalis, is found in North America.
