= Acerra (incense box) =

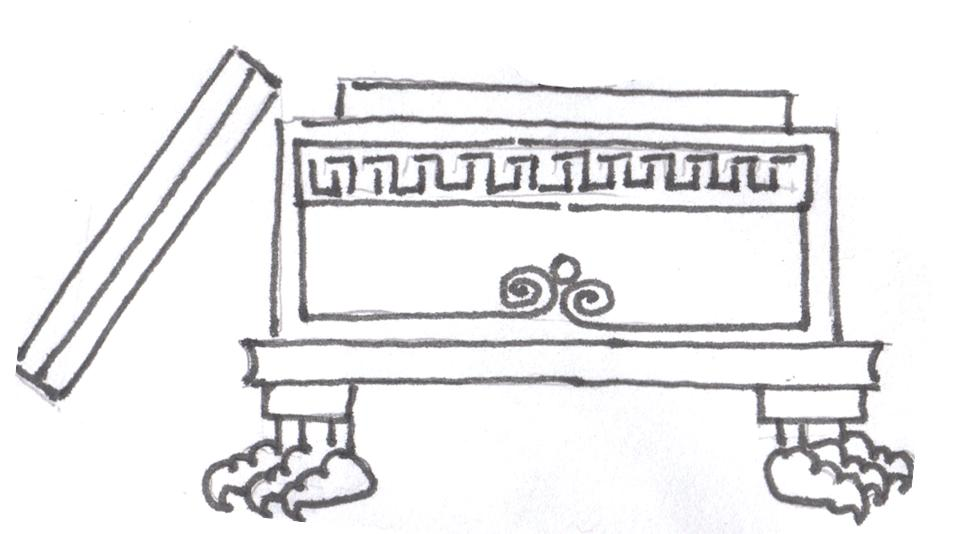
Acerra

In Ancient Roman sacrificial tradition, an acerra (Greek: λιβανωτρίς) was the incense box used in sacrifices. The incense was taken out of the acerra and let fall upon the burning altar; hence, we have the expression de acerra libare. (turibulum)

The acerra was also, according to Festus, a small altar, placed before the dead, on which perfumes were burnt. There was a law in the Twelve Tables, which restricted the use of acerrae at funerals.
