= Clitumnus =

Deity in Roman mythology

In Roman mythology, Clitumnus (/klɪˈtʌmnəs/; Latin: Clītumnus) was a son of Oceanus and Tethys. He was the god of the Clitunno River in Umbria.

Reference to Clitumnus is best attested in Pliny the Younger "Letters" 8.8: "Hard by is an ancient and sacred temple, where stands Jupiter Clitumnus himself clad and adorned with a toga praetexta, and the oracular responses delivered there prove that the deity dwells within and foretells the future."

The Roman Emperor Caligula visited the sacred grove prior to his invasion of Germany, presumably to consult the oracle of Clitumnus.
