= Agliano, Campello sul Clitunno =

Agliano
- Frazione
- Location within Italy
- Coordinates: 42°51′56″N 12°52′19″E
- Country: Italy
- Region: Umbria
- Province: Perugia
- Comune: Campello sul Clitunno
- Elevation: 1,030 m (3,380 ft)

Population (2001)
  - Total: 8
- Time zone: UTC+1 (CET)
  - Summer (DST): UTC+2 (CEST)
- Postcode: 06042
- Area code: 0743

Agliano is a frazione of the comune of Campello sul Clitunno in the Province of Perugia, Umbria, central Italy. It stands at an elevation of 1030 metres above sea level. At the time of the Istat census of 2001 it had 8 inhabitants.
