= Acera =

- Frazione
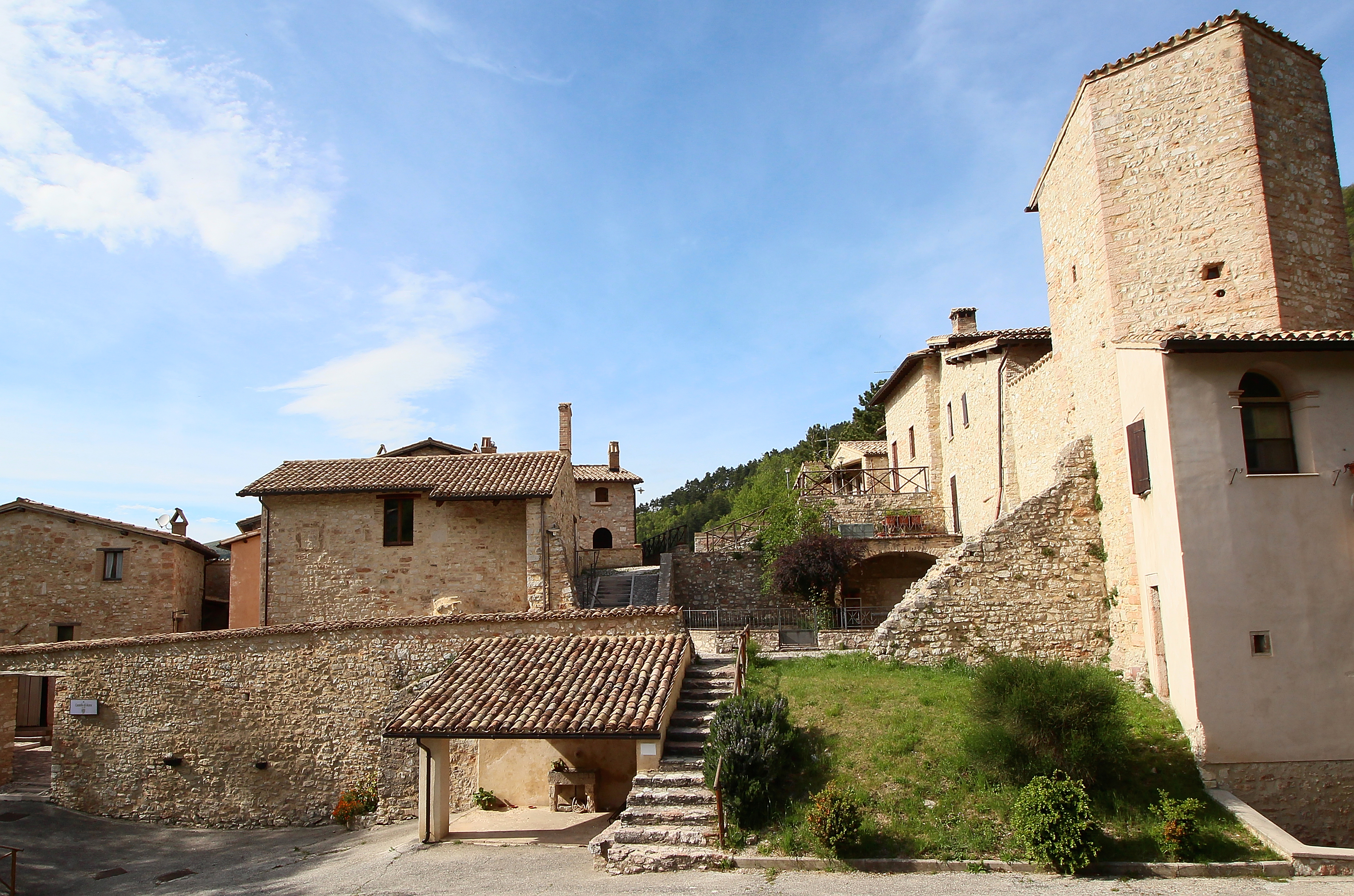
- Acera

- Location within Italy
- Coordinates: 42°50′55″N 12°50′35″E
- Country: Italy
- Region: Umbria
- Province: Perugia
- Comune: Campello sul Clitunno
- Elevation: 972 m (3,189 ft)

Population (2001)
  - Total: 19
- Time zone: UTC+1 (CET)
  - Summer (DST): UTC+2 (CEST)
- Postcode: 06042
- Area code: 0743

Acera is a frazione of the comune of Campello sul Clitunno in the Province of Perugia, Umbria, central Italy. It stands at an elevation of 972 metres above sea level. At the time of the Istat census of 2001 it had 19 inhabitants.

== History ==
Near the town, which gets its name from the surrounding maple woods, at Monte Maggiore (1.430), there were found prehistoric and Roman remains. The Castello di Acera (The maple castle) was built in 1296 by a Podestà sent from Spoleto to unite the dispersed population of the villages Acera and Spina. After the Italian unification of 1860 it became part of Campello sul Clitunno.

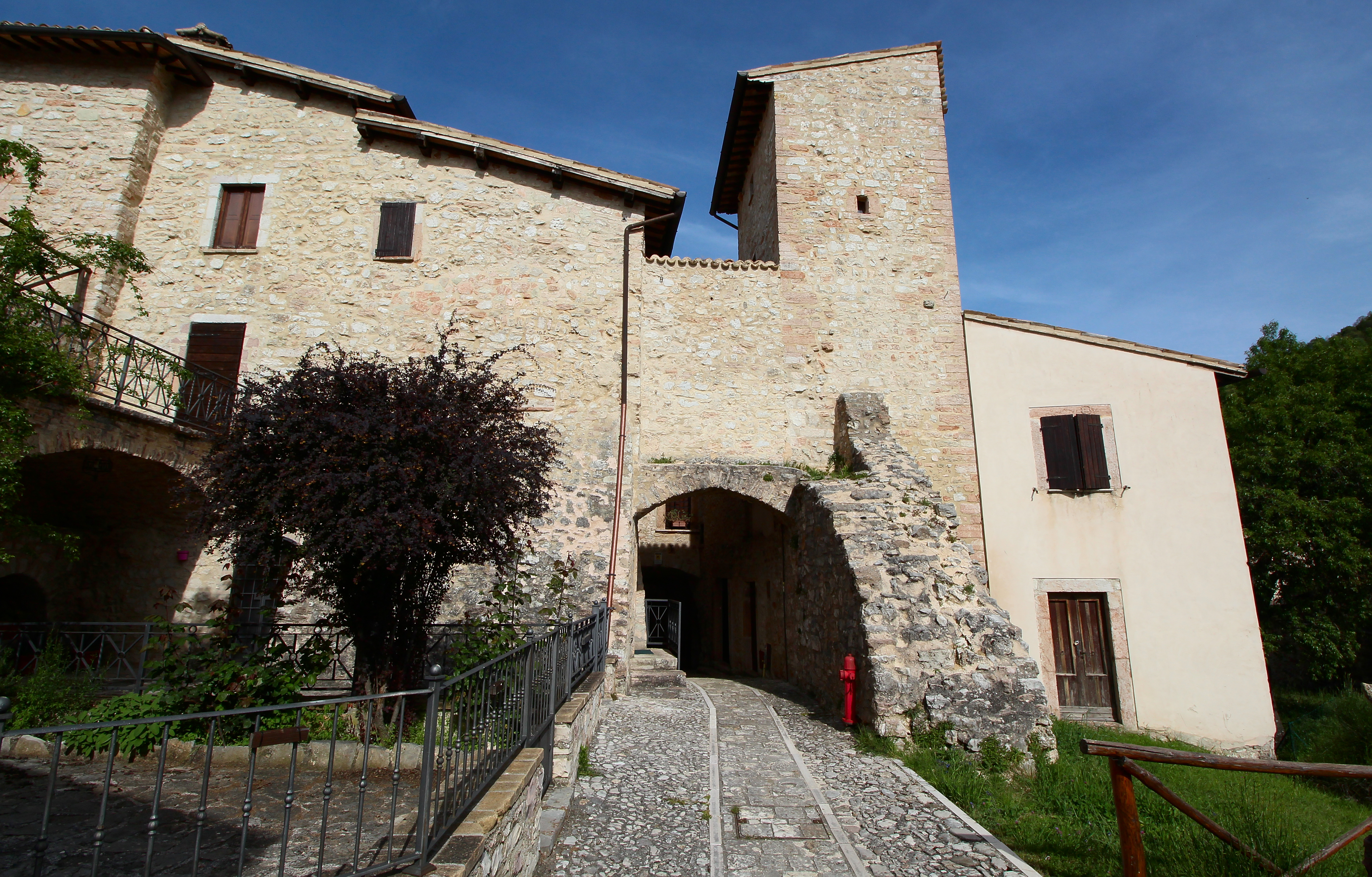
City gate porta del castello

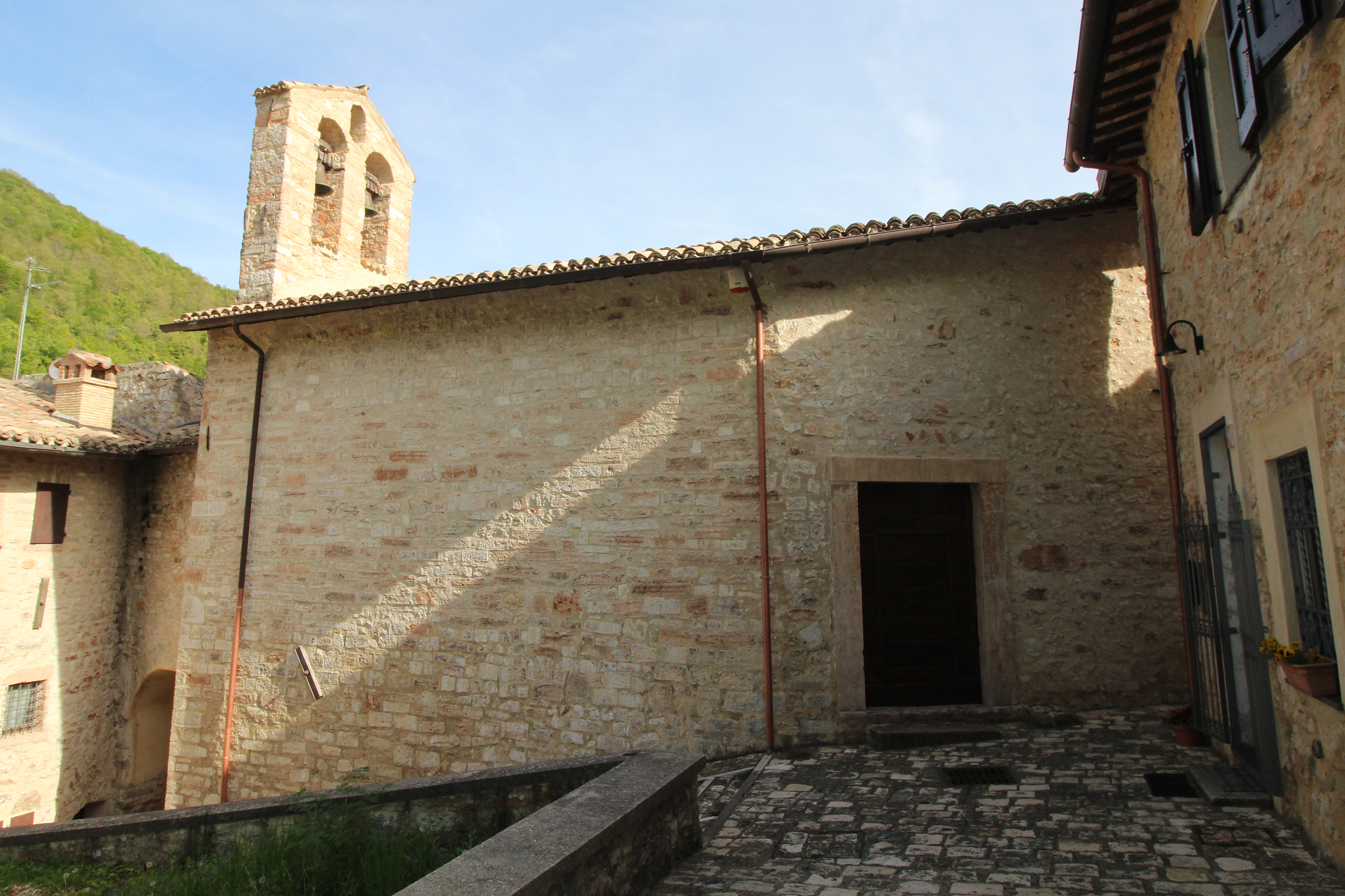
San Biagio

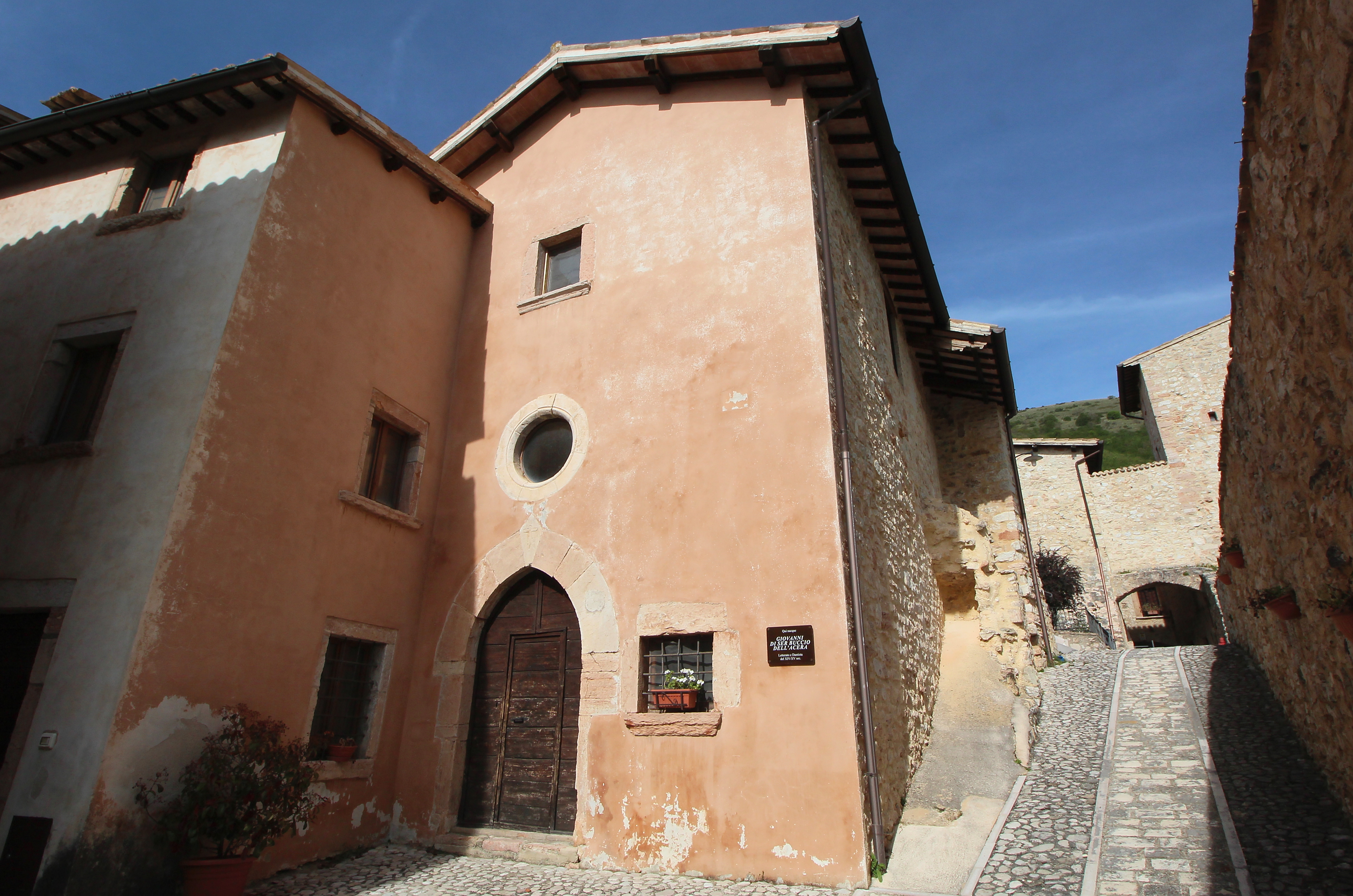
Madonna del Rosario

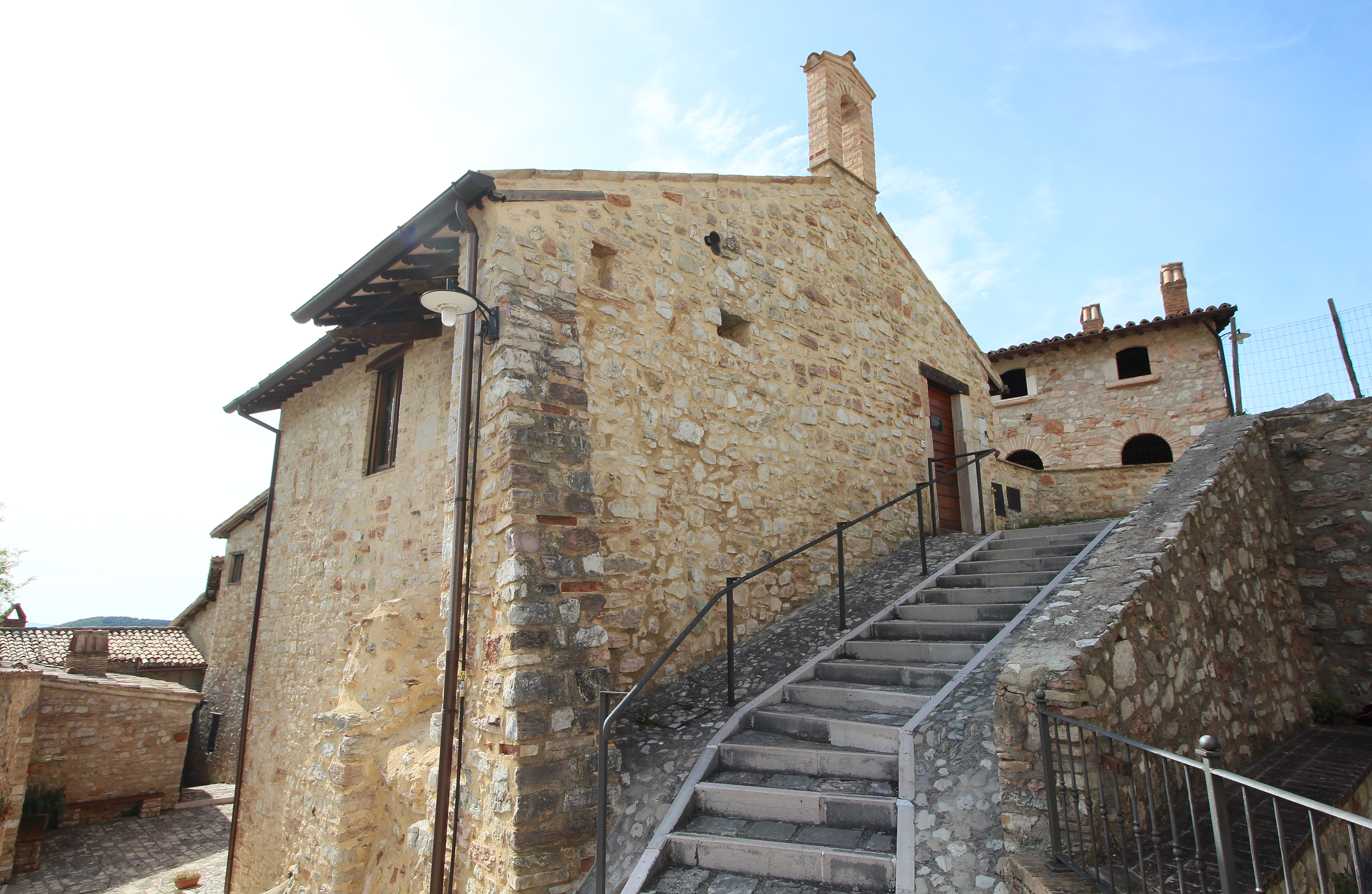
Madonna del Rosario
