= Trinci =

Coat of arms of the house of Trinci

The Trinci were a noble family from central Italy, who were lords of Foligno, in Umbria, from 1305 to 1439.

== History ==
During the War of the Guelphs and Ghibellines which tore apart Italy from the 12th to the 14th century, the Trinci were initially Guelphs, but switched to the other party from 1240. Corrado (I) and Trincia I Trinci held the title of podestà or vicar of Foligno in the late 13th century.

In 1305 the Trinci, after returning to the Guelphs, became lords of Foligno by expelling the Ghibelline Anastasi thanks to the support of nobles from Spoleto and Perugia. Nallo governed as capitano del popolo until 1318. After him, the Trinci held the titles of gonfaloniere di giustizia (standard-bearer of justice) and capitani.

Nallo's brother, Ugolino, ruled until 1336, being succeeded by Nallo's son, Corrado I, who died in 1341. He was followed by Ugolino Novello, the last to hold the aforementioned titles. The first official recognition came in 1367, when Pope Urban V named Ugolino's son, Trincia II Trinci, as apostolic vicar. Trincia was killed in 1377 by some Ghibellin exiles. His brother Corrado II ruled Foligno until 1386, followed by his son Ugolino III, who was a friend of the condottiero Braccio Fortebraccio.

His sons Niccolò, Bartolomeo and Corrado III co-ruled the city from 1415 to 1421. Corrado, however, decided to break with the Papal authority. Assailed by Cardinal Giovanni Maria Vitelleschi, he lost Foligno, which thereafter lost its autonomy and became part of the Papal States.

Palazzo Trinci was the residence of the Trinci family. The palace was built over a medieval building by Ugolino III between 1389 and 1411. After the defeat and death of Corrado III, the palace became the seat of the pontifical government of Foligno.

== Lords of Foligno ==
The Trinci family were lords of Foligno from 1305 to 1439.

| N° | Title | Name | From | To | Spouse |
| 1 | Capitano del popolo | Nallo | 1305 | 1318 | Chiara Gabrielli |
| 2 | Gonfaloniere of Justice | Ugolino | 1318 | 1336 | Risabella Gaetani |
| 3 | Gonfaloniere of Justice | Corrado I | 1336 | 1341 | Agnese Baglioni |
| 4 | Gonfaloniere of Justice | Ugolino II | 1341 | 1349 | Vittoria Montemarte |
| 5 | Apostolic vicar | Trincia II | 1349 | 1377 | Giacoma d'Este; vicar from 1367 |
| 6 | Apostolic vicar | Corrado II | 1377 | 1386 | Anna da Montefeltro |
| 7 | Apostolic vicar | Ugolino III | 1386 | 1415 | Costanza Orsini |
| 8 | Apostolic vicar | Niccolò | 1415 | 1421 | Tora da Varano |
| 9 | Apostolic vicar | Corrado III | 1421 | 1439 | Costanza Orsini |

Another family member was Paolo (1309-1391), founder of the order of the Zoccolanti.

== See also ==
- Palazzo Trinci
- Papal States

== Sources ==
- Dorio, Durante (1638). Istoria della famiglia Trinci. Foligno: Agostino Alteri.
- Nessi, Silvestro (2006). Trinci Signori di Foligno. Foligno: Edizioni Orfini Numeister. ISBN 88-89274-08-5.
