= Bettona =

- Comune
- Comune di Bettona
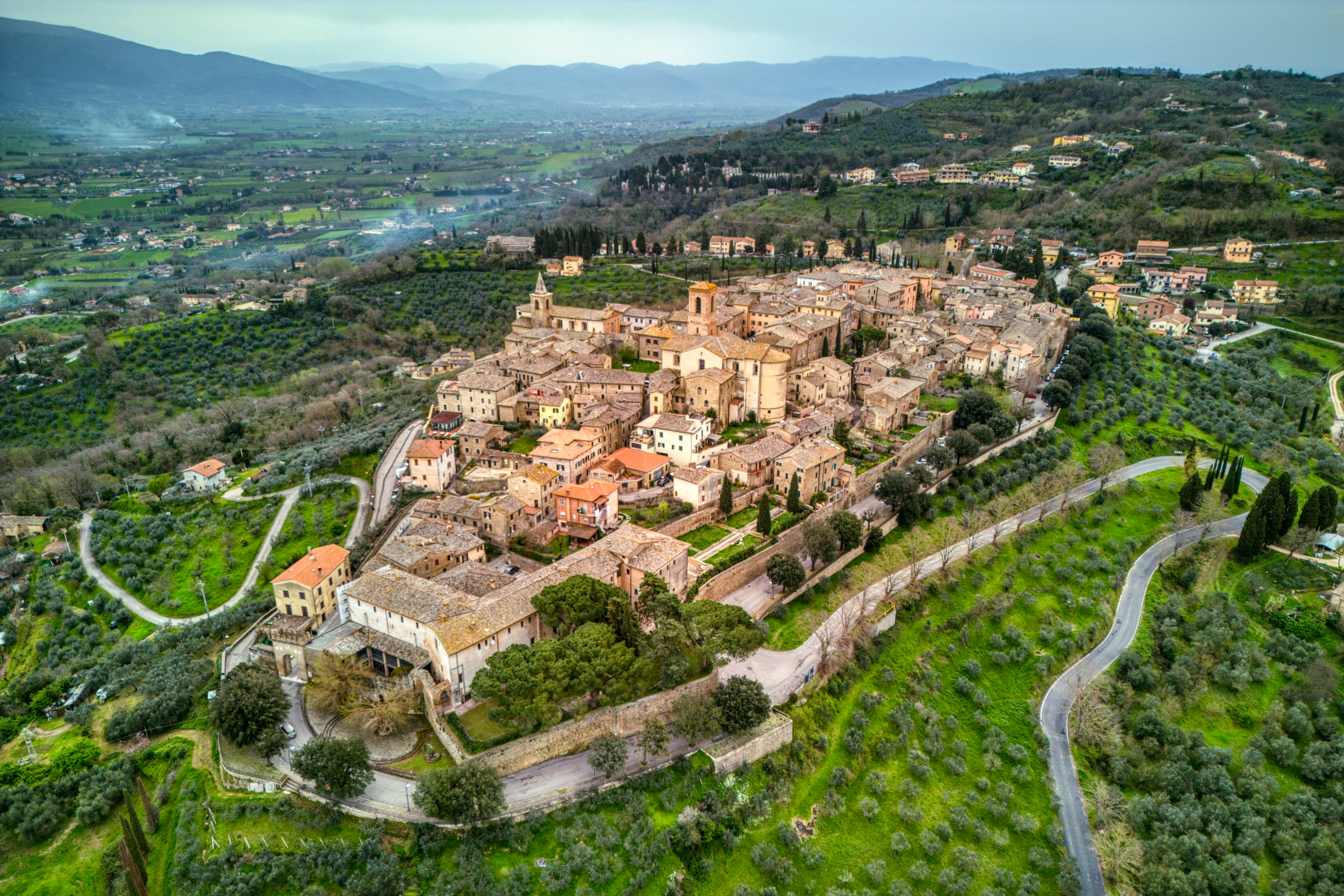
- View of Bettona

- Coat of arms

- Location within Italy Location within Umbria
- Coordinates: 43.013572°N 12.484562°E
- Country: Italy
- Region: Umbria
- Province: Perugia

Government
  - Mayor: Lamberto Marcantonini

Area
  - Total: 45 km^{2} (17 sq mi)
- Elevation: 353 m (1,158 ft)

Population (1 January 2025)
  - Total: 4,227
  - Density: 94/km^{2} (240/sq mi)
- Demonym: Bettonesi
- Time zone: UTC+1 (CET)
  - Summer (DST): UTC+2 (CEST)
- Postal code: 06084
- Dialing code: 075
- Patron saint: Saint Crispoldus
- Saint day: May 12
- Website: Official website

Bettona (Latin: Vettona) is an ancient town and comune of Italy, in the province of Perugia in central Umbria, at the northern edge of the Colli Martani range.

The town lies 5 kilometres (3.1 mi) east of Torgiano and 12 kilometres (7.5 mi) south-west of Assisi. It is one of I Borghi più belli d'Italia ("The most beautiful villages of Italy").

== Etymology ==
The name Bettona is traditionally derived from the ancient Vettona. According to a legendary account, the city was founded by Tirio Vetonio, an Umbrian, though this origin is considered without historical foundation.

== History ==
=== Antiquity ===
Bettona originated as a settlement in the 8th–7th century BC. It was conquered by the Romans in the 4th century BC and became a municipium.

Vettona was mentioned by Pliny among the Umbrian cities and recorded in the Itinerarium Peutingerianum along the route from Amelia to Perugia via Todi. It is also referenced by the Ravennate geographer. In antiquity its territory included that of present-day Collazzone (ancient Urvinum Hortense). Vettona belonged to the Clustumina tribe, while Urvinum was assigned to the Stellatina.

An inscription dated to 123 AD, dedicated by the inhabitants of Urvinum Hortense to Magnia Urbica Augusta, is noted among the archaeological finds of the area.

Bettona had an episcopal seat from an early period. According to tradition, its first bishop was Saint Crispoldus, placed either in the 1st century or around the 4th century, when he is also said to have suffered martyrdom. He was buried in a church later dedicated to him and became the patron saint of the town. The only historically-documented bishop was named Gaudentius, who took part in a synod at Rome called by Pope Hilarius in 465.

=== Middle Ages ===
The town declined in the early Middle Ages during the barbarian invasions and suffered damage in 548 at the hands of Totila. It subsequently came under Byzantine control, before later becoming part of the Duchy of Spoleto under Lombard rule.

By the late 12th century Bettona had developed into a self-governing municipality. In 1198 it came under Papal authority while remaining within the ecclesiastical jurisdiction of the diocese of Assisi. This led to prolonged conflict with Assisi lasting about thirty years, culminating in Bettona's forced submission in 1223. During this period it allied with Foligno and the Emperor against Assisi and Perugia.

In 1352 Bettona was besieged by Perugia, captured, and burned. The city was demolished, and its stone was reused in the construction of the Palazzo dei Priori in Perugia. Reconstruction was ordered in 1367 by Cardinal Albornoz, and the town was rebuilt with smaller but stronger fortifications.

From 1389 to 1425 Bettona was under the rule of the Trinci family of Foligno. In 1425 it was granted to the Baglioni family, a change that met with local resistance and led to its conquest in 1439 by Malatesta Baglioni.

=== Modern era ===
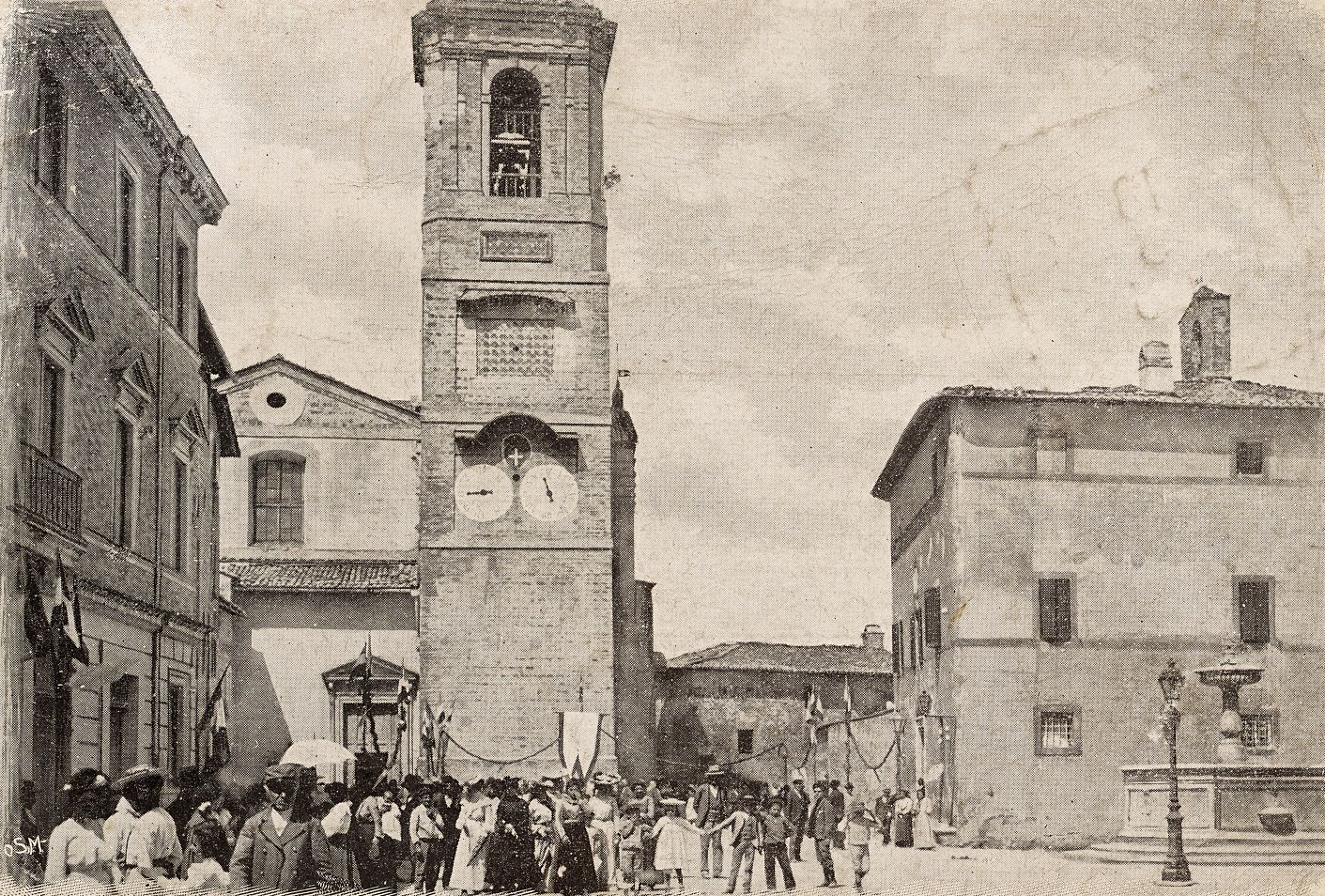
Piazza Cavour in Bettona, 1905

In 1648 Bettona passed under direct Papal rule, which continued until Italian unification. In 1827 it became a podesteria under the Delegation of Perugia. This system remained in place until unification.

In 1860 a plebiscite was held, in which the population voted overwhelmingly to join the Kingdom of Italy.

In the mid-19th century Bettona had a population of 2,650 inhabitants. Of these, about 650 lived within the town and 2,000 in the surrounding countryside.

== Geography ==
Bettona is situated on a hill which slopes northward toward Perugia and opens into a cultivated plain. At the foot of the hill flow the rivers Topino and Chiascio. Other waterways in the territory include the Ose, which flows into the Topino, the Cagnola, which joins the Chiascio, and the Sambro and Fosso Maggiore.

=== Subdivisions ===
The municipality includes the localities of Bettona, Cerreto, Colle, I Barbini, La Palazzetta, Malandruge, Passaggio, Prigionieri, Taglioni, Torte.

In 2021, 1,909 people lived in rural dispersed dwellings not assigned to any named locality.

At the time, most of the population lived in Passaggio (1,133), and Bettona proper (551).

== Economy ==
In the 19th century the territory produced grain, wine, oil, wood, charcoal and acorns, with olive oil noted for its quality and exported in particular. Livestock breeding included pigs, and sericulture was practiced. Local crafts included the production of baskets and other woven goods. The area also contained a quarry of veined white alabaster, as well as deposits of limestone and pozzolana.

== Religion ==
=== Sant'Antonio ===
The church of Sant’Antonio contains several works of art. In a chapel to the left of the entrance there was a tempera painting of Saint Anthony Abbot bearing the signature of Perugino, later transferred to the municipal picture gallery. Opposite is a tempera panel depicting the Virgin with angels in adoration, Saint Manno and Saint Jerome, attributed to Perugino. At the high altar is an oil painting of the Virgin with various saints attributed to Dono Doni (1510). The church also preserves a 16th-century terracotta statue of Saint Anthony of Padua.

=== San Crispolto ===
The church of San Crispolto houses, in the center of the apse, a large panel attributed to Dono Doni representing the Adoration of the Shepherds, with scenes from the life of Saint Crispolto in the predella. In the old sacristy there is a late 15th-century fresco of Saint Michael the Archangel. The eastern side of the adjoining convent is built upon remains of an Umbrian-Etruscan structure.

The church formerly belonged to the Benedictines and transferred to the Conventual Franciscans in 1266. The relics of Saint Crispolto are venerated in a chapel.

=== Santa Maria Maggiore ===
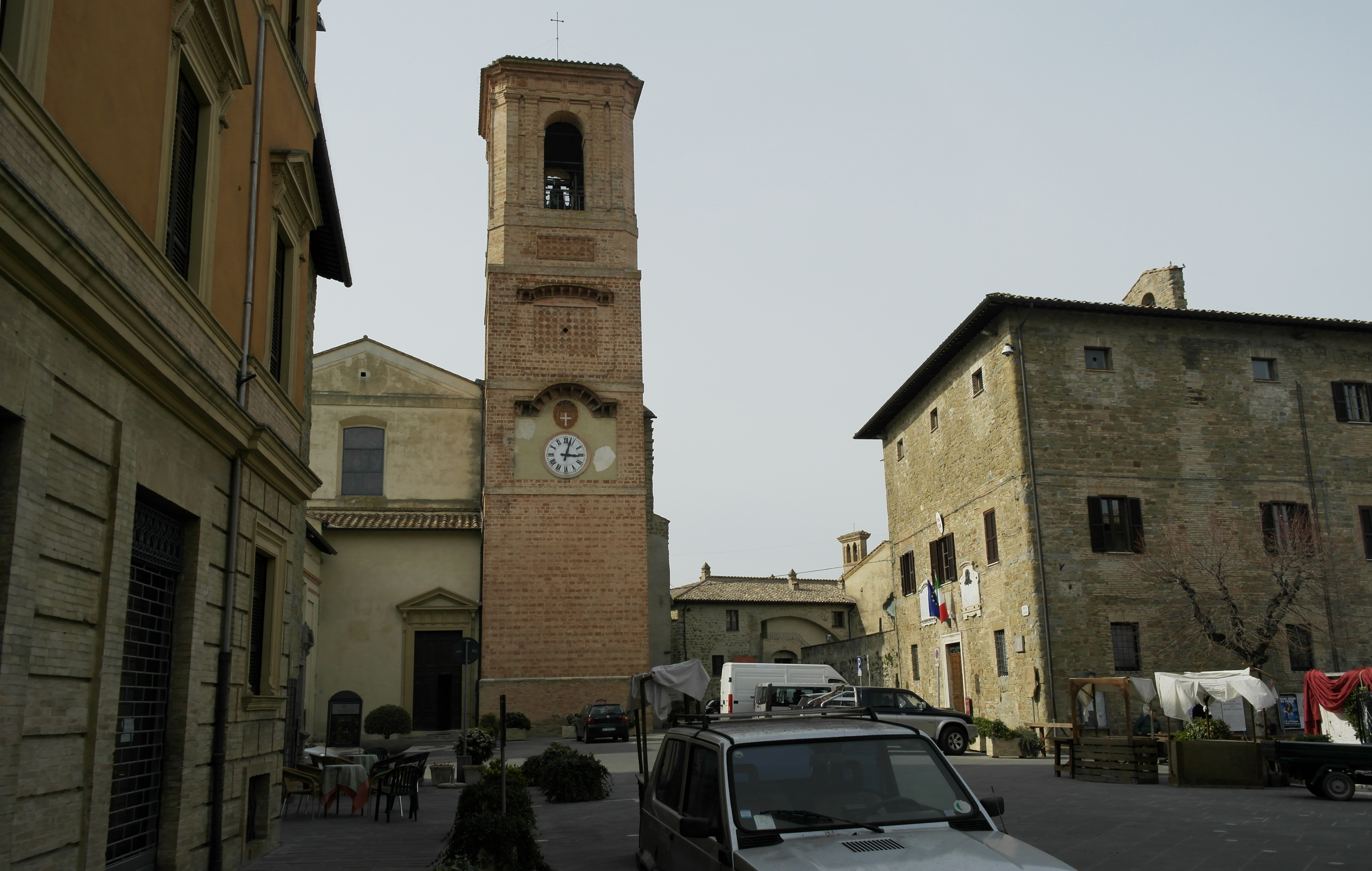
Santa Maria Maggiore

The principal church of Bettona is Santa Maria Maggiore, located on the main square. An earlier Gothic church on the site was consecrated in 1226, while the present building was constructed in the early 19th century. The church is spacious and contains seven altars, including those in two large chapels forming a Greek cross. Notable works include a tabernacle in marble dated 1590 and paintings preserved in the sacristy, including an Assumption and a Saint Anne attributed to Lo Spagna.

The church preserves a marble ciborium sculpted by Cruciano Egiduccio of Bettona in 1590. In the sacristy there is a tempera painting by Tiberio d'Assisi depicting the Virgin, Saint Anne, Saint Crispolto and Saint Anthony. In the archpriest's hall is a tempera panel from the school of the Gaddi, as well as a painted banner attributed to Antonio da Foligno.

A Gothic chapel located near the nave entrance and dedicated to Saint Rita, is the only remaining part of the original church. The main altar is in the shape of domed temple, by Cruciano Egiduzio. The apse was frescoed in 1939 by the futurist painter Gerardo Dottori.

The church formerly held cathedral status. Under the Latin name Bettonium the bishopric is listed by the Catholic Church as a titular see.

=== Other religious buildings ===
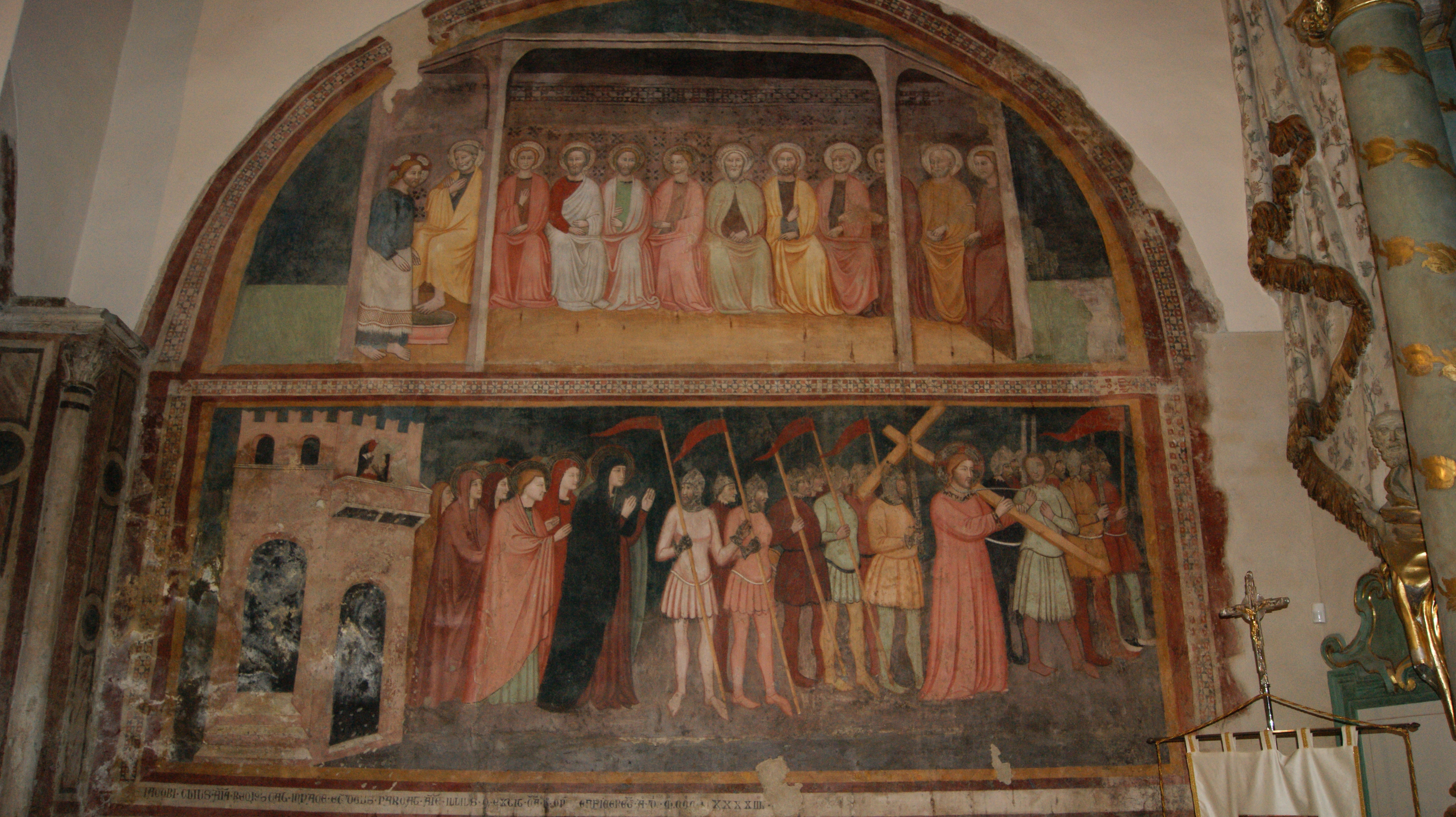
Passion cycle fresco, Oratorio di Sant'Andrea

In the oratory of Sant'Andrea is a series of paintings from the school of Giotto, dated 1394, which show the Passion of Christ. The paintings were rediscovered during a 1980s restoration. A beautiful carved wooden ceiling and baroque altar also are features of the church.

Located about one-third of a mile from the town, the convent of San Onofrio was inhabited by Capuchins. The church preserves fragments of 15th-century frescoes.

Outside Porta Sant'Antonio stands the convent of the Observant Franciscans, with a small library and a church containing paintings attributed to Pietro Perugino and Dono Doni, as well as a glazed terracotta statue of Saint Anthony.

== Culture ==
=== Fortifications ===
The town preserves a circuit of walls originating in the Etruscan period. The currently visible walls largely result from a reconstruction carried out by Cardinal Albornoz after the destruction of Bettona in 1352. The rebuilt walls partially follow the line of the earlier Etruscan fortifications, fragments of which survive, often incorporated into the medieval structure.

The blocks are parallelepiped or trapezoidal in shape, sometimes bearing visible tool marks and, in rare cases, traces of rusticated finishing. The walls are constructed of lithoid tuff, with an external surface that is flat and slightly inclined inward. The stone blocks are carefully cut and laid in horizontal courses, though in some places they follow the slope of the underlying clay.

Several stretches of the ancient walls remain visible, including a right-angled section near Viale Roma and Porta Vittorio Emanuele, and a partly altered section near Porta Romana with preserved horizontal courses. The walls date to no later than the 3rd century BC.

=== Villa del Boccaglione ===
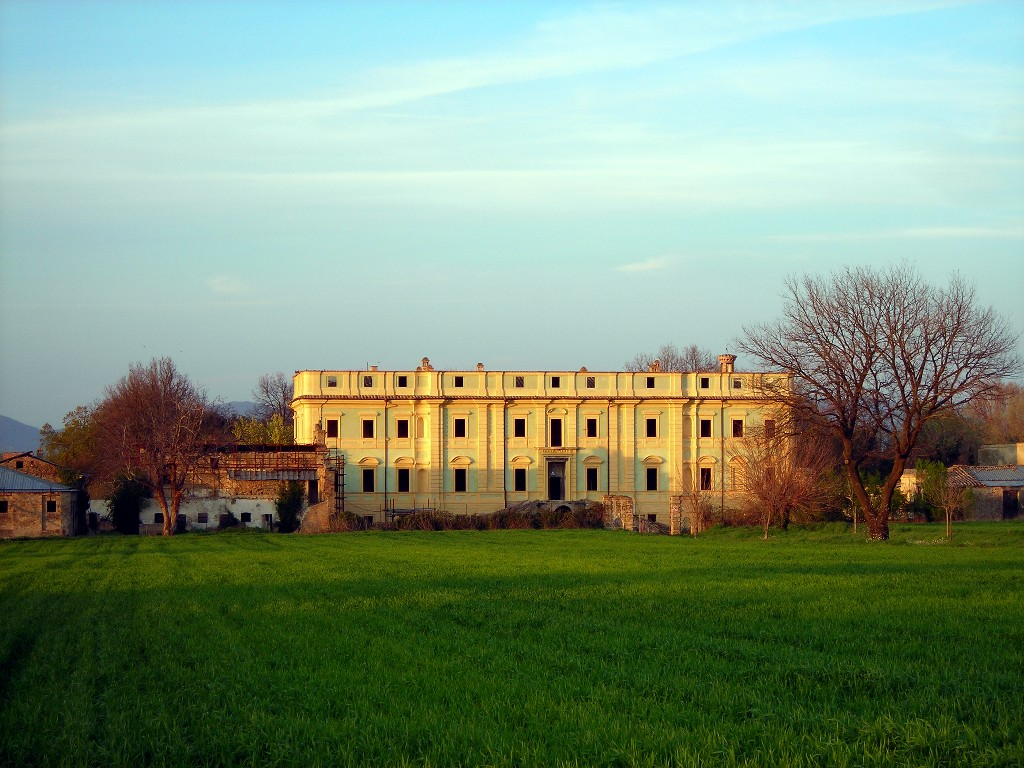
Villa del Boccaglione

The Villa del Boccaglione was commissioned by the Della Penna family and, according to some scholars, designed in the 18th century by the architect Piermarini. The villa was built over the remains of an earlier 16th-century structure.

The building is in neoclassical style and is situated in the plain at the foot of the hill of Bettona. It consists of a central three-story block with rich interior and exterior decoration, accompanied by several ancillary structures including a church, an orangery and stables. The surrounding gardens are a defining feature, while at the rear a horseshoe-shaped park extends into a wooded area containing a small open-air theatre.

=== Chamber tomb ===
A barrel-vaulted chamber tomb is located in the locality of Colle, a short distance from the town. The tomb is built entirely of local sandstone. Its walls have a double facing of carefully cut blocks laid without mortar. Five courses of the original outer facing survive.

The tomb is reached by a small dromos with side walls made of regular courses matching the inner facing, along with two steps that are largely original. Just before the entrance threshold there is a drainage hole; a second opening appears in the first slab of the floor. Both channeled water into an underground collection chamber near the entrance.

The entrance has a full arch with a high, curved lintel of irregular shape. At the time of discovery, the tomb had already been looted and the contents disturbed. The surviving grave goods, including small urns, jewelry, bronze objects, and glass vessels, indicate use between the mid-3rd century BC and the 1st century BC.

=== Other secular buildings ===
On the main square stand the former government residence, the municipal palace, and archival buildings preserving documents dating back to the 14th century.

=== Other cultural heritage ===
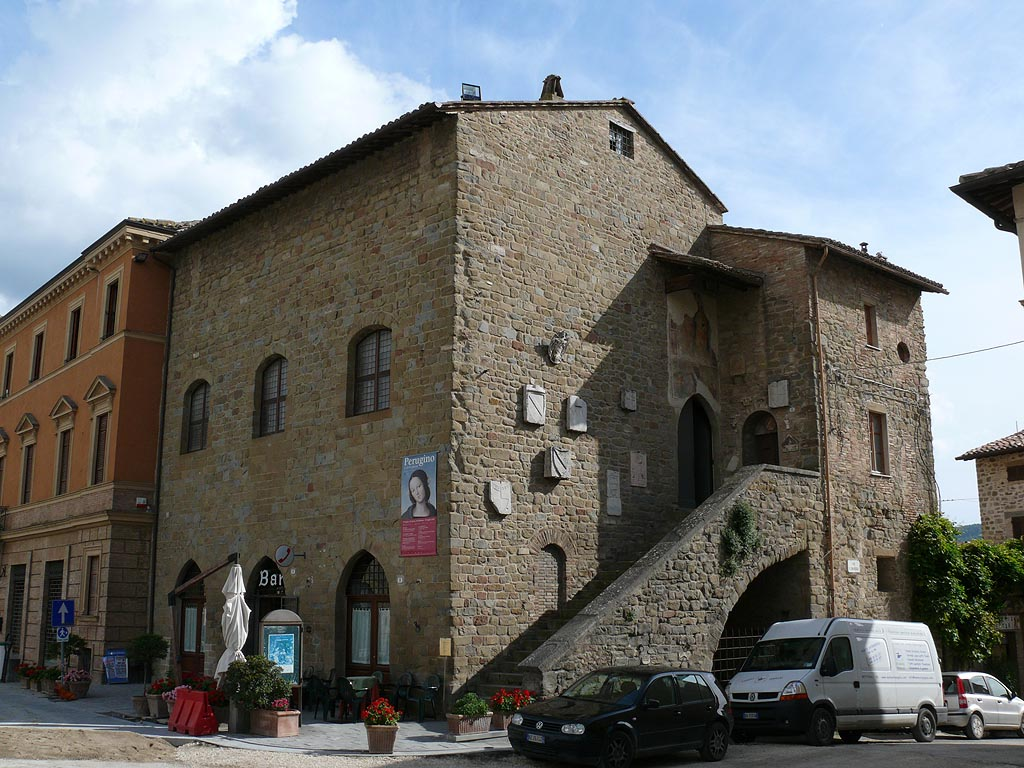
Palazzetto del Podestà

The Pinacoteca Comunale in the Palazzetto del Podestà (1371) has a painting by Perugino, the Madonna of Mercy, as well as other works by Jacopo Siculo, Dono Doni, Fiorenzo di Lorenzo, and Della Robbia.

In the 19th century town possessed a theatre and a philharmonic society.

== Notable people ==
Bettona is associated by tradition with the poet Propertius. Other notable figures include Gentile da Bettona, bishop in the 13th century; Francesco Beninsegna, active in the early 14th century; Niccolò Ferragatti, bishop of Foligno; Francesco Alducci, a 15th-century military figure; Niccolò Olivi, bishop of Assisi; Clemente Cellini; and later scholars and writers such as Stefano Tofi and Giuseppe Bianconi.

Among the principal families recorded in the 19th century were the Bianconi, Barocchi, Censi, Preziotti and Pennacchi.
