= Valtopina =

- Comune
- Comune di Valtopina
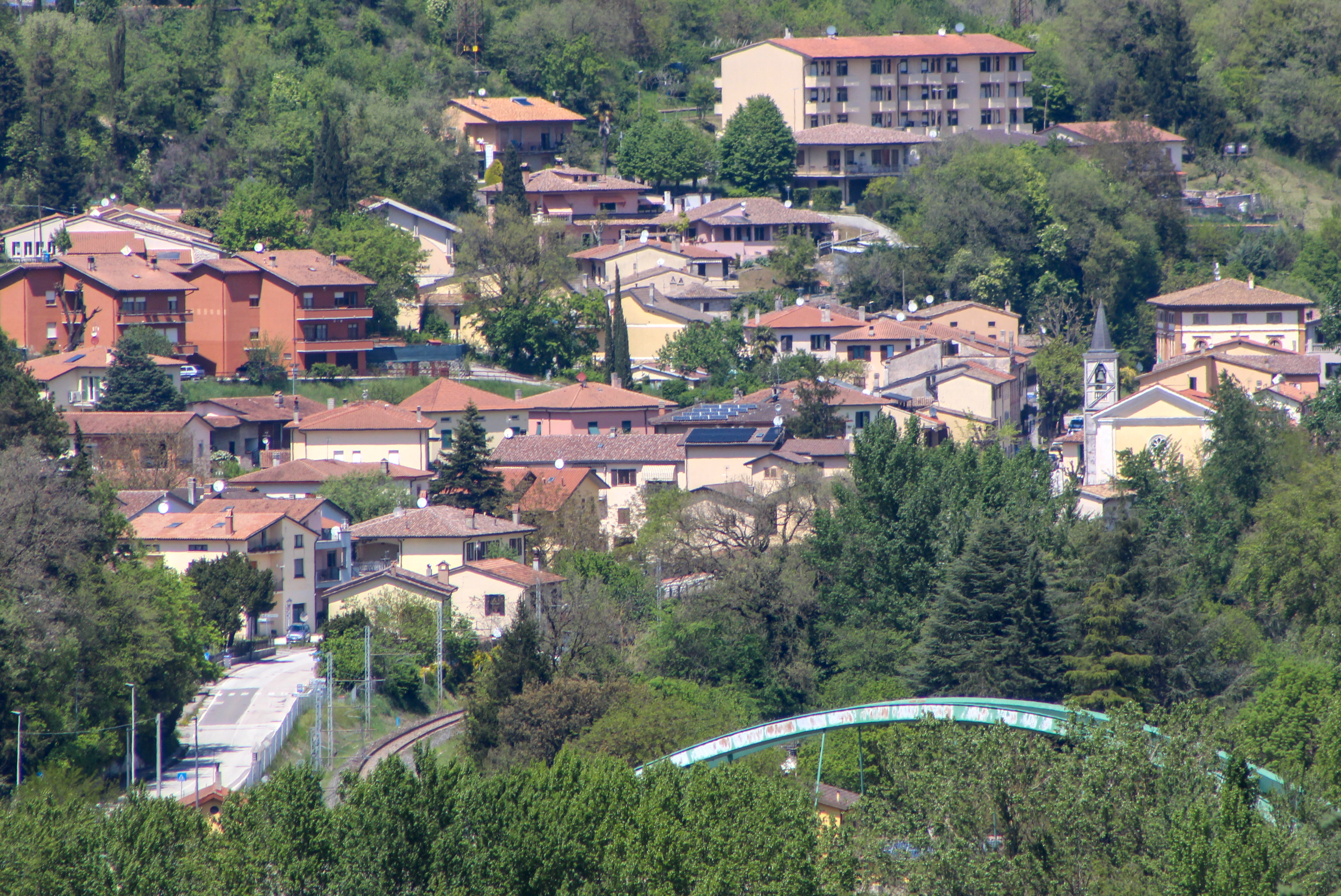
- View of Valtopina

- Location within Italy Location within Umbria
- Coordinates: 43.05896°N 12.754583°E
- Country: Italy
- Region: Umbria
- Province: Province of Perugia (PG)

Government
  - Mayor: Gabriele Coccia

Area
  - Total: 40.5 km^{2} (15.6 sq mi)
- Elevation: 366 m (1,201 ft)

Population (1 January 2025)
  - Total: 1,288
  - Density: 31.8/km^{2} (82.4/sq mi)
- Demonym: Valtopinesi
- Time zone: UTC+1 (CET)
  - Summer (DST): UTC+2 (CEST)
- Postal code: 06030
- Dialing code: 0742
- Website: Official website

Valtopina is a comune (municipality) in the Province of Perugia in the Italian region Umbria, located about 30 km east of Perugia.

== Etymology ==
The name Valtopina derives from the position of the settlement, located low in a valley and bordered by the Topino river.

The community was originally known as Cerqua (referring to oak trees or woodland). This earlier name remained in official cartography until the 20th century and is still used locally.

== History ==
Between the 10th and 11th centuries a system of castles and villages developed in the area, forming the Universitas Vallis Topini et Villae Balciani. This territorial entity included the districts of Poggio, Santa Cristina, Gallano, Pasano, Serra and Balciano.

By 1235 the territory extended to roughly twice its present size and constituted an autonomous viscounty within the Duchy of Spoleto. The viscount held a temporary office, with administrative authority exercised from the castle of Poggio and supported by a council composed of heads of households. During the 13th century the area suffered territorial losses as a result of political conflicts.

Submission to Assisi in 1282 was undertaken to counter the expansion of Foligno, but autonomy was restored in 1300 by Pope Boniface VIII. From 1383 to 1439 the territory was ruled by the Trinci family of Foligno as viscounts. Statutes issued in 1434 under Corrado Trinci remained in force until 1816.

Throughout the Middle Ages the population was concentrated mainly on the hills, while settlement in the valley developed in connection with trade along the Via Flaminia.

In the late 15th century a fair dedicated to San Bernardino was established at the confluence of the Topino and a watercourse known as the Anna.

The castle of Poggio remained the administrative seat until around 1800. Between 1816 and 1817 Valtopina was dependent on the government of Nocera. It became an autonomous municipality in 1827 with a mayor, but in 1833 it was again placed under the administration of Nocera.

In 1860 the territory was annexed to the Kingdom of Sardinia. Between 1927 and 1947 it was annexed to the municipality of Foligno, before being restored as an autonomous municipality in 1948.

In 1895 Valtopina had a population of 1,279 inhabitants.

== Geography ==
Valtopina is situated in the valley of the Topino river, approximately 10 kilometres (6.2 mi) from Nocera and 17 kilometres (11 mi) from Foligno. The river Topino flows near the settlement, and the Via Flaminia passes through the area.

The surrounding territory is predominantly mountainous. The Furlo Pass crosses the area.

The chief settlement of the municipality, also recorded under the names Val Sopina and Cerqua, is of relatively modern origin and is noted in the 19th century as having no particular historical importance. Cerqua developed as a roadside settlement along the Via Flaminia, near the church of San Pietro.

Valtopina borders the following municipalities: Assisi, Foligno, Nocera Umbra, Spello.

=== Subdivisions ===
The municipality includes the localities of Balciano, Casa Tommaso, Cerqua Rosara, Fosso della Ghianda, Giove, L'Opera Pia, Ponterio, Valtopina.

In 2021, 448 people lived in rural dispersed dwellings not assigned to any named locality. At the time, the most populous locality was Valtopina proper (611).

== Economy ==
In the late 19th century the territory produced grain, pasture, hay, chestnuts and acorns. Part of the population earned a livelihood by attaching oxen to carts to assist transport along a nearby steep ascent, particularly for the movement of wood, charcoal, and other goods.

== Religion and culture ==
=== Castle of Poggio ===
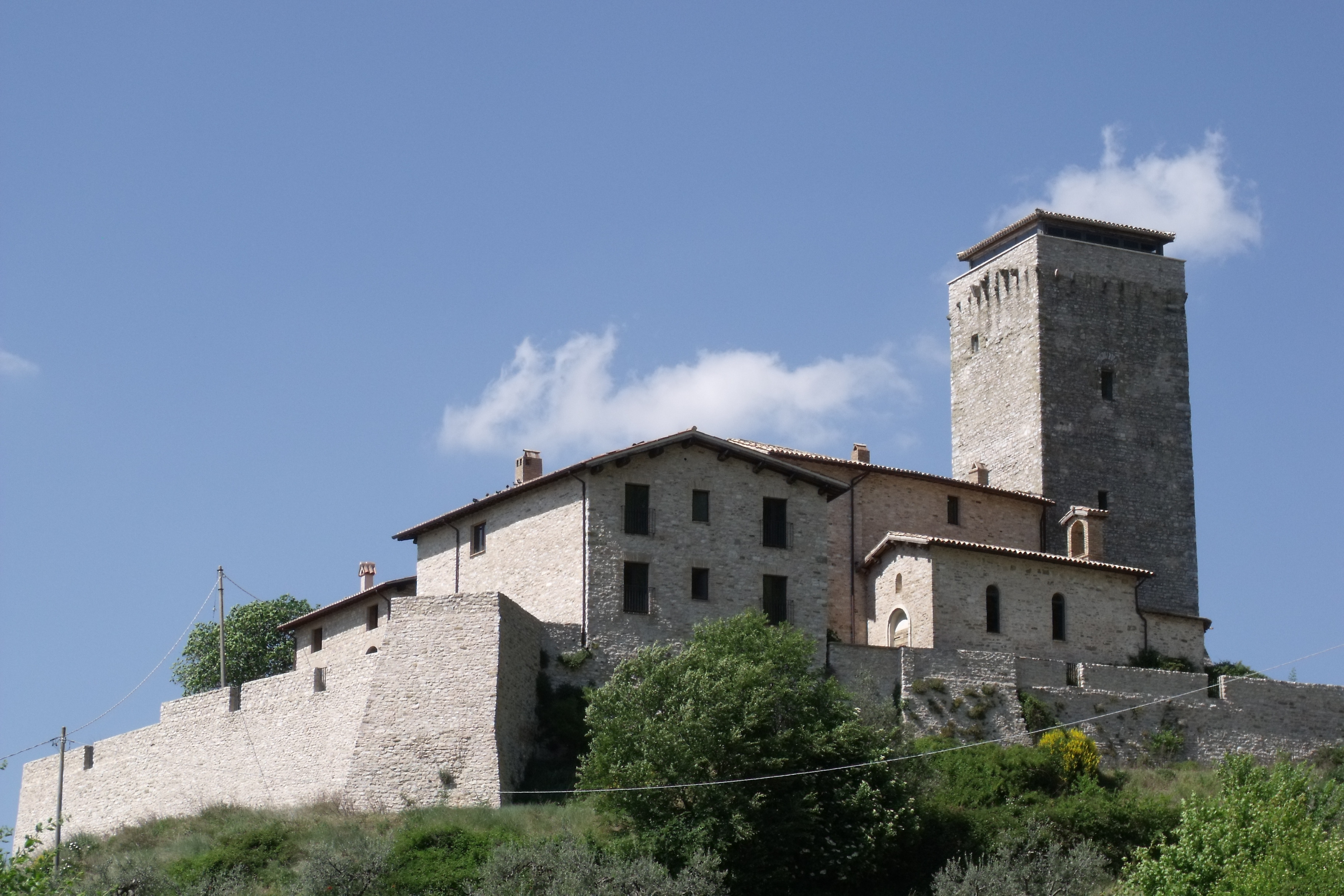
Castle of Poggio

The Castle of Poggio, dating to the 11th century, was one of the principal fortified sites of the area and served as the seat of the viscount of the Topino valley, controlling a wide territory that included castles, churches, monasteries, and smaller settlements.

The structure retains an imposing tower in a good state of preservation. Historically it also housed the granary, guard quarters, and a prison, while the settlement of Casa Coccia below formed its borgo. The castle continued to serve as the municipal seat until 1867, when administrative functions were transferred to Valtopina.

=== Museo del Ricamo e del Tessile ===
The Museo del Ricamo e del Tessile, opened in 2007, reflects the local importance of embroidery. The collection documents the development of embroidery and textile traditions between the late 19th and early 20th centuries. It is divided into sections dedicated to women's fashion, personal linen, and household linen, illustrating changes in style and decorative techniques.
