= Giorgio Lungarotti =

Italian agricultural entrepreneur and viticulturalist

Giorgio Lungarotti (1910–1999) was an Italian agricultural entrepreneur and viticulturalist who operated in Torgiano, a medieval town in the Perugia area (Umbria), located at the heart of a large area dedicated to grape-growing at the confluence of the Chiascio and Tiber rivers.

== Biography ==
The son of land-owners, after his Agricultural studies at the University of Perugia, he worked alongside his father in managing the family estate, experimenting in the sectors of viticulture, olive-growing, fruit orchards, tree cultivation, and cattle and swine husbandry.

In the 1950s he managed the delicate passage from sharecropping to direct management of the family company, gradually moving away from other crops and specialized in viticulture, a choice which later resulted in the opening of Cantine Lungarotti Winery, a winery that from its inception has been based on rational methods and updated, responsible enological practices.

In 1968 Torgiano received the DOC appellation for its Rosso and Bianco wines, the first of these prestigious appellations to be awarded to Umbria's wine production; in 1990 the DOCG was granted to Rosso Riserva (with retroactive recognition to the 1983 vintage). With the collaboration and curatorship of his wife, art historian Maria Grazia Marchetti, he founded the Wine Museum of Torgiano (MUVIT) and the Olive and Oil Museum (MOO) in Torgiano, as well as the Lungarotti Foundation (1987) all of which are aimed at highlighting the great cultural heritage associated with agriculture in Italy, through activities of research, exhibits and publications.

In 1981 Lungarotti found in Torgiano the wine competition called Banco di Assaggio dei Vini d’Italia (BAVI) in collaboration with the Ministry of Agriculture and the Region of Umbria, the latter of which took on its management in later years.

== Accolades ==
In 1991 the President of the Italian Republic, Francesco Cossiga, decorated Lungarotti with the title of Cavaliere del Lavoro.

== See also ==
- List of wine personalities
