= Cantine Lungarotti Winery =

Italian wine company

Coordinates: 42.9491775°N 12.4698117°E

Lungarotti Winery
- Location: Torgiano, Umbria, Italy
- Appellation: Torgiano DOC, Torgiano Rosso Riserva DOCG, Umbria IGT Bianco, Umbria IGT Rosso
- Key people: Chiara Lungarotti, Chairman
- Cases/yr: 208,000
- Known for: Torgiano Rosso Riserva DOCG Rubesco Riserva "Vigna Monticchio"
- Varietals: Sangiovese, Sagrantino, Grechetto, Vermentino, Chardonnay, Cabernet Sauvignon, Colorino, Merlot, Pinot grigio
- Distribution: Italian and export markets (43 countries)
- Website: www.lungarotti.it

The Lungarotti Winery arl is an Italian wine company located in the region of Umbria, Italy. The property is divided between several locations, with the largest in the towns of Torgiano and Montefalco. Founded in the late 1950s by Giorgio Lungarotti, the company is now headed by his wife Maria Grazia, and sisters Teresa and Chiara. The Lungarotti name is famous for putting Umbrian wines on the map, through a mixture of traditional respect for the land and modern innovation and research. The Lungarotti company also owns the Wine Museum of Torgiano (MUVIT) and the Olive and Oil Museum (MOO), all two located in the center of Torgiano.

== History ==
The Lungarotti winery as it is known today was born in the late 1950s. Previously renowned for his family's small-production wines, Giorgio Lungarotti decided to transform his vineyard into a larger scale production, guided his love and respect for the land. Giorgio, together with his wife Maria Grazia, was able to tap into the potential of the under-recognized Umbrian Region, creating a high-quality wine with a marriage between technology and tradition. The most important wine for the Lungarotti brand is Rubesco. Named for the Latin verb, "to blush", it originated from a new way to grow the vine, and a selection of the traditional varietals vinified in a scientific manner. This process was created by Giorgio himself, and is a point of pride for the company.

== Bibliography ==
- Hugh Johnson, Modern encyclopedia of wine, New York, Simon and Schuster, 1983
