= Topino =

Stream in Umbria, Italy

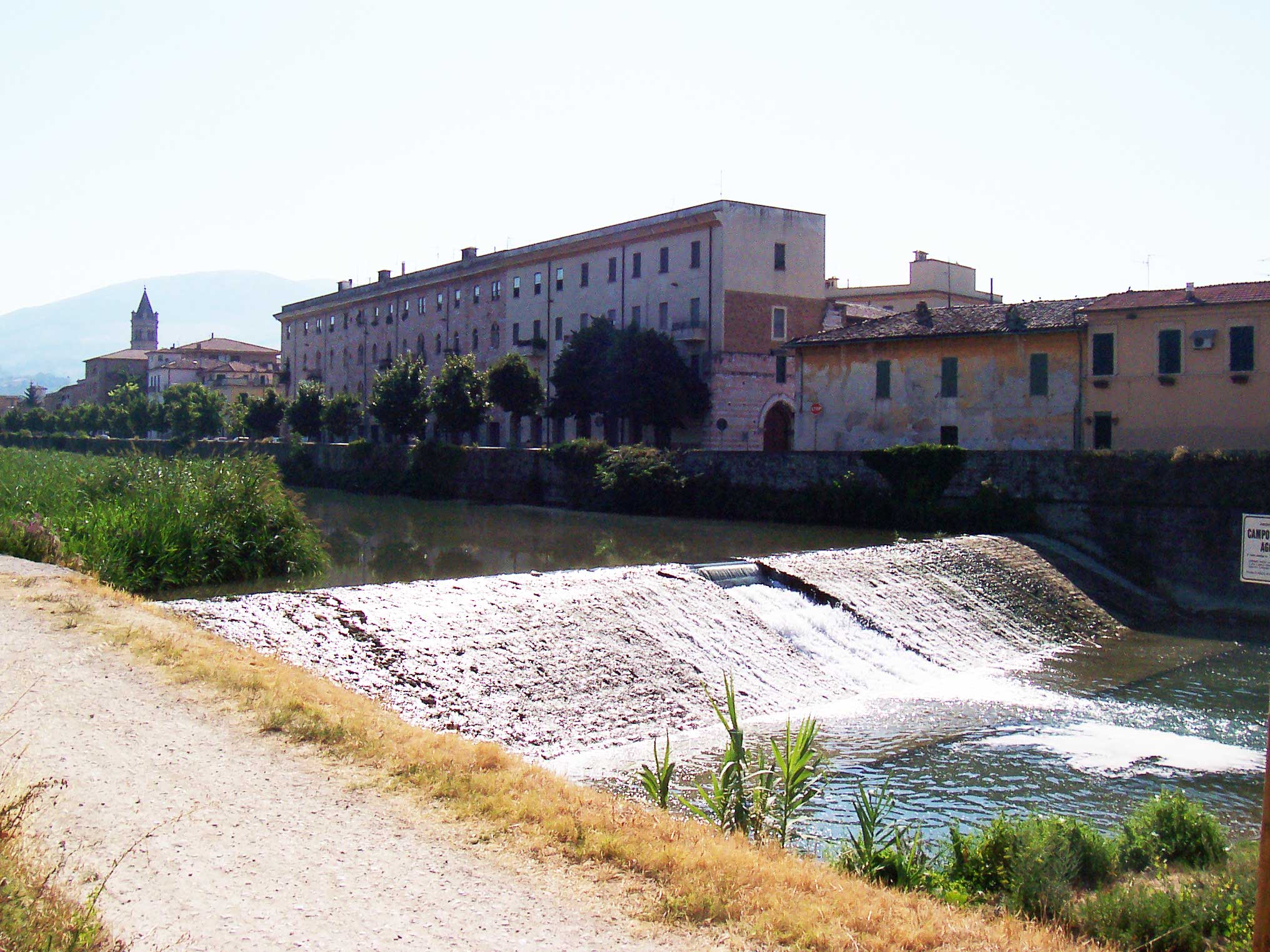
- Topino river

Location
- Country: Umbria, Italy

Physical characteristics
- Source
  - location: Monte Pennino
  - elevation: 649 m (2,129 ft)
- Mouth: Chiascio
  - location: Passaggio
  - coordinates: 43.0287°N 12.5008°E
- Length: 50 km (31 mi)
- Basin size: 1,234 km^{2} (476 mi^{2})
- Discharge
  - average: 12 m^{3}/s (420 cu ft/s)

Basin features
- Progression: Chiascio→ Tiber→ Tyrrhenian Sea

The Topino is a river in Umbria, central Italy. It was known in ancient times as Supunna by Umbri and later in Latin as Tinia and is mentioned by Dante Alighieri in the Canto XI of the Paradise. It is the main tributary of the Chiascio, in the Tiber basin. It is about 50 km long, and its drainage basin covers 1,234 km^{2}.

== Background ==
Its spring is on the slopes of the Monte Pennino, at 649 metres (2,129 ft), in the territory of Nocera Umbra. Topino's tributaries include the Menotre, the Clitunno (known as Timia past its confluence with Marroggia creek), and the Ose (whose spring is in the comune of Spello).

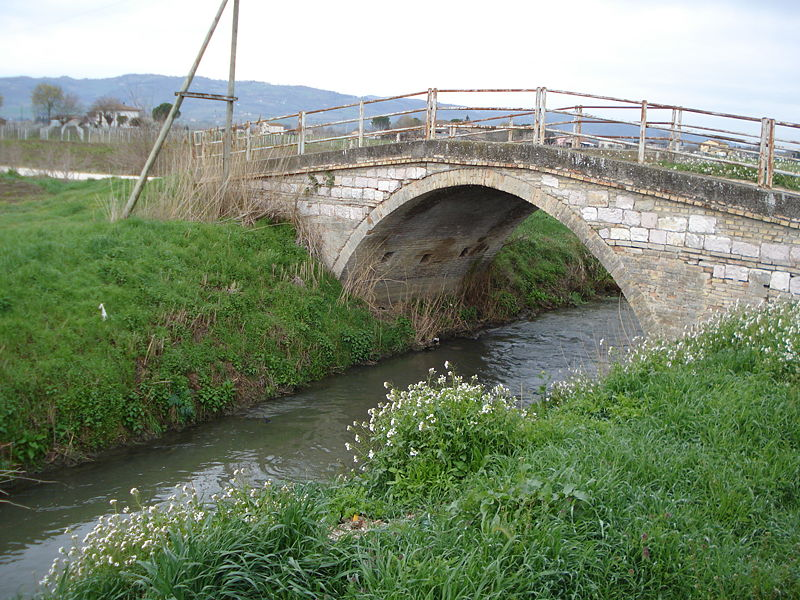
Ose (torrent)

After passing through the comuni of Valtopina, Foligno, Bevagna, Cannara and Bettona, it joins the Chiascio at Passaggio.
