= Palazzo Trinci =

Patrician residence in the center of Foligno, Italy

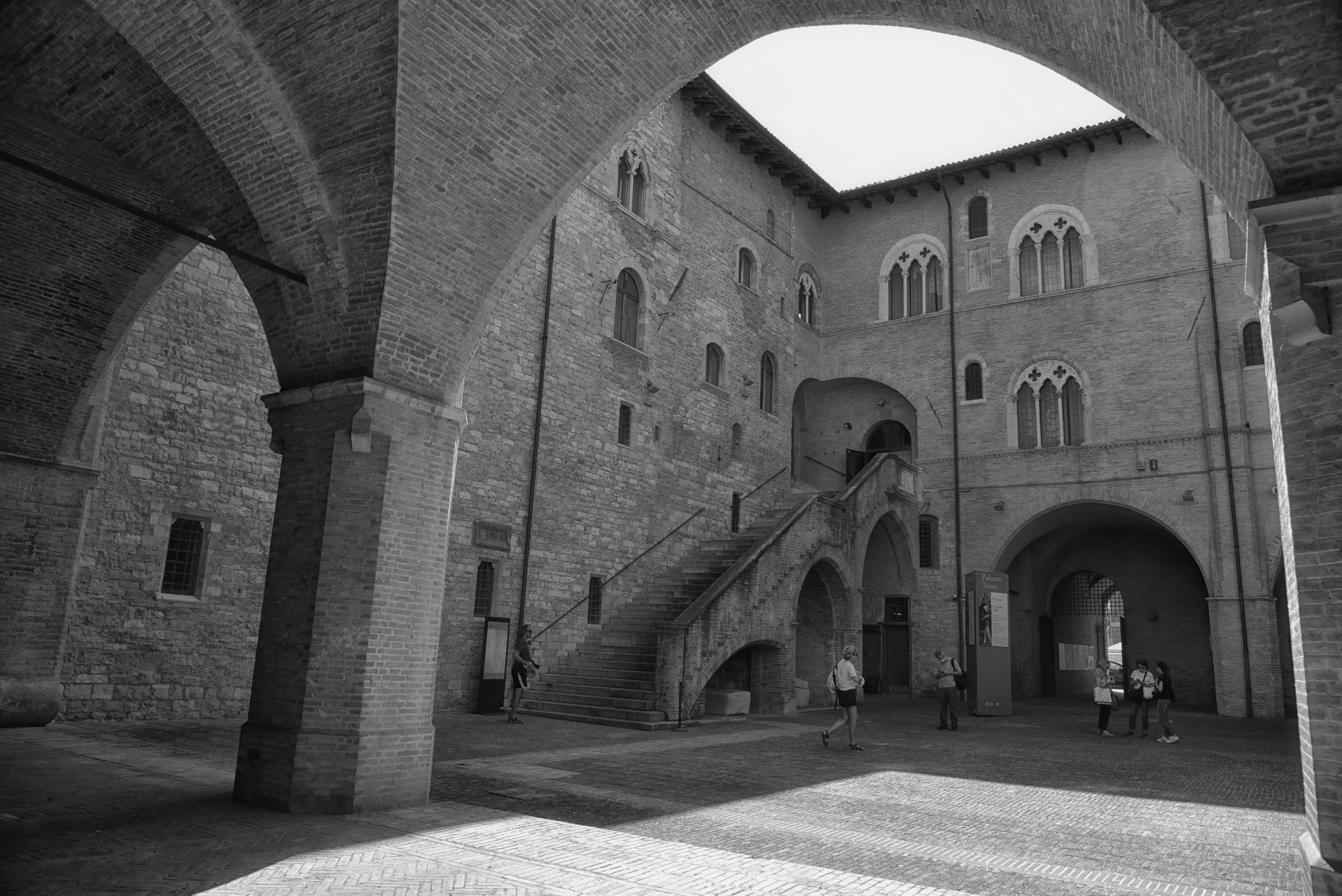

- Location within Umbria
- 42°57′18″N 12°42′13″E
- Location: Foligno

History
- Built: 1389-1407
- Built for: Ugolino III Trinci

Site notes
- Architectural styles: Gothic architecture and Neoclassical architecture

The Trinci Palace is a patrician residence in the center of Foligno, central Italy. It houses an archaeological museum, the city's picture gallery, a multimedia museum of Tournaments and Jousts and the Civic Museum.

== History ==
Palazzo Trinci was the residence of the Trinci family who ruled over the city from 1305 to 1439. The palace was built (attested by archival documents) over a medieval building by Ugolino III Trinci between 1389 and 1407. An adapted Roman burial stele states the date 1407, which may be the actual year the construction started. It was completed in 1411.

After the defeat and death of Corrado III Trinci (June 1441), the palace became the seat of the Priori del Popolo and the papal government of Foligno. From that moment on, the building began to decline slowly. Already in 1458 Pope Pius II had to provide 200 guilders for its restoration. A similar episode occurred in 1475 with pope Sixtus IV and in 1546 with pope Paul III Farnese. The south-west part of the building was used as a prison from 1578 on. The staircase in the courtyard was restored in 1679, but then demolished in 1781. In the early 18th century, a small part of the south-west building was converted to a small theater.

The building underwent serious damage by the earthquakes of 1831-1832 and minor damages by the bombing of Foligno in 1944 and the earthquake of 1985.

== Description ==
The present inconspicuous Neoclassical façade dates only from 1842 to 1847. It was built by Vincenzo Vitali on a draft of Odoardo Poggi, amended by Sigismondo Ferretti.

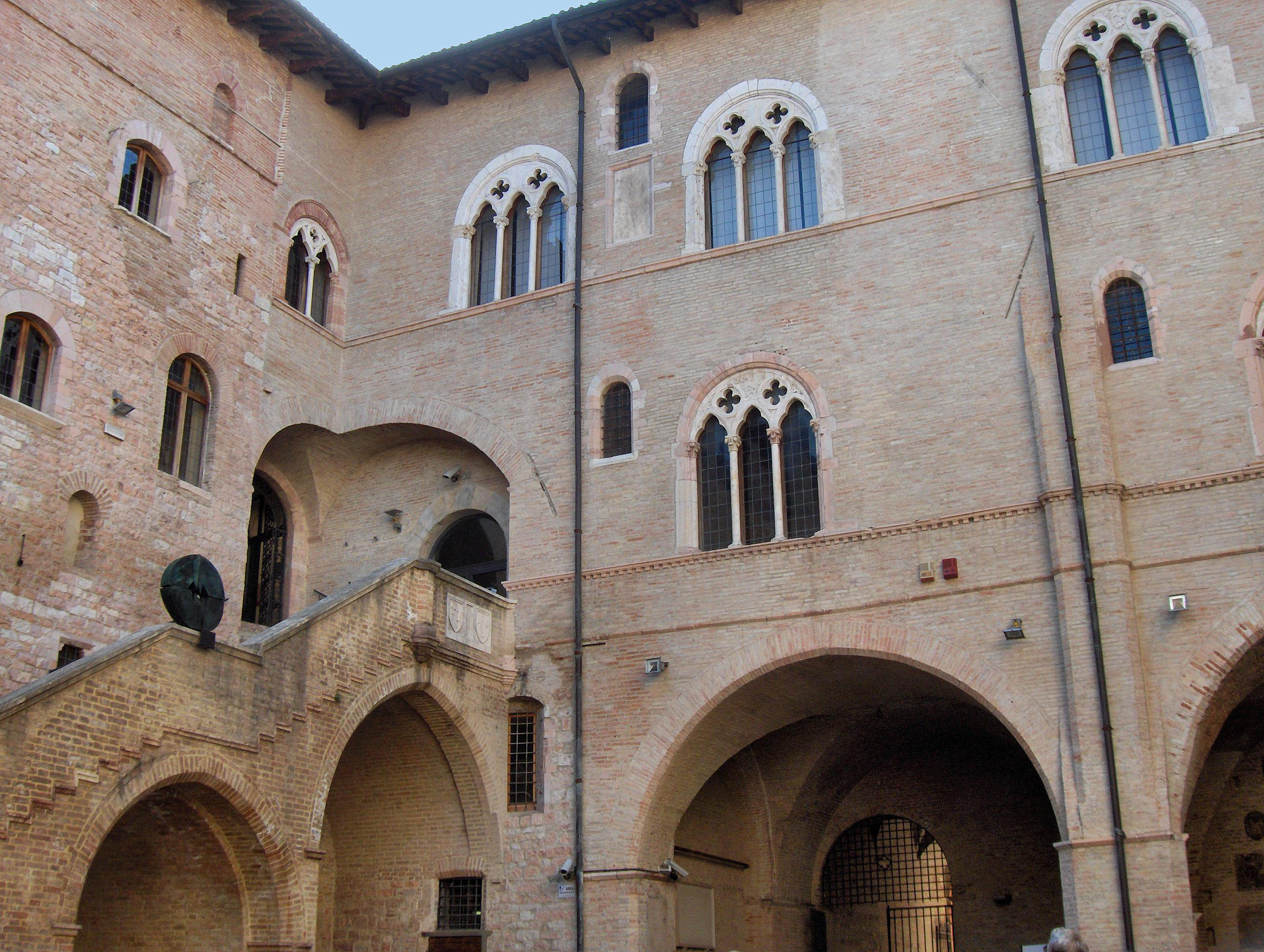
Inner courtyard and Gothic staircase

The arcaded inner courtyard reflects the problems the architects faced when they wanted to save as much as possible from the pre-existing structure. They created a transition from the Romanesque style and Gothic style of the ground floor to the Renaissance style of the upper floors. The steep Gothic staircase (Scala Gotica) was built over three Romanesque cross vaults between 1390 and 1400, when the palace still belonged to the wealthy merchant Giovanni Ciccarelli. The surface of this staircase and the surrounding cloister walls were originally covered with frescoes, now almost completely lost. The staircase, demolished in 1781, was rebuilt by Cesare Bazzani in 1927.

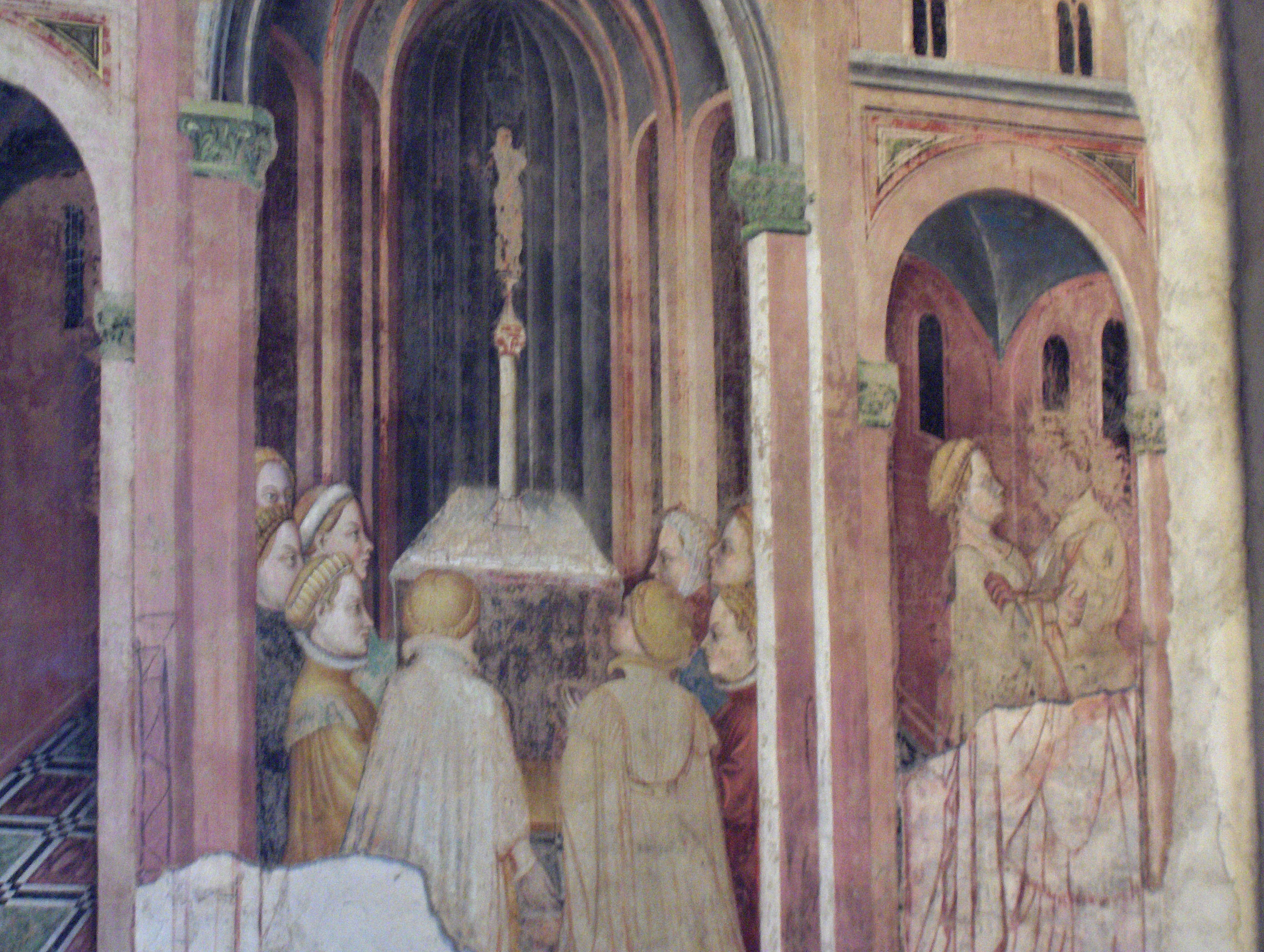
Rhea Silvia is seduced by Mars

All frescoes in the palace, except those of the chapel, were commissioned by Ugolino III Trinci, who died in 1415. Their execution started probably in 1407. The concept of these fresco cycles probably came from Francesco Federico Frezzi, the bishop of Foligno and author of the Quadriregio, a poem of the four kingdoms Love, Satan, the Vices, and the Virtues. Some of these frescoes were painted between 1411 and 1412 by Gentile da Fabriano, with the assistance of Jacopo Bellini. The designs were by Gentile, but their painting was almost completely done by pupils. The authorship of the frescoes was attested by Lodovico Coltellini, a scholar who saw in 1780 two receipts to Ugolino Trinci by Gentile da Fabriano for painting the halls. Some of the frescoes in the palace depicting secular subjects are attributed to Giovanni di Corraduccio

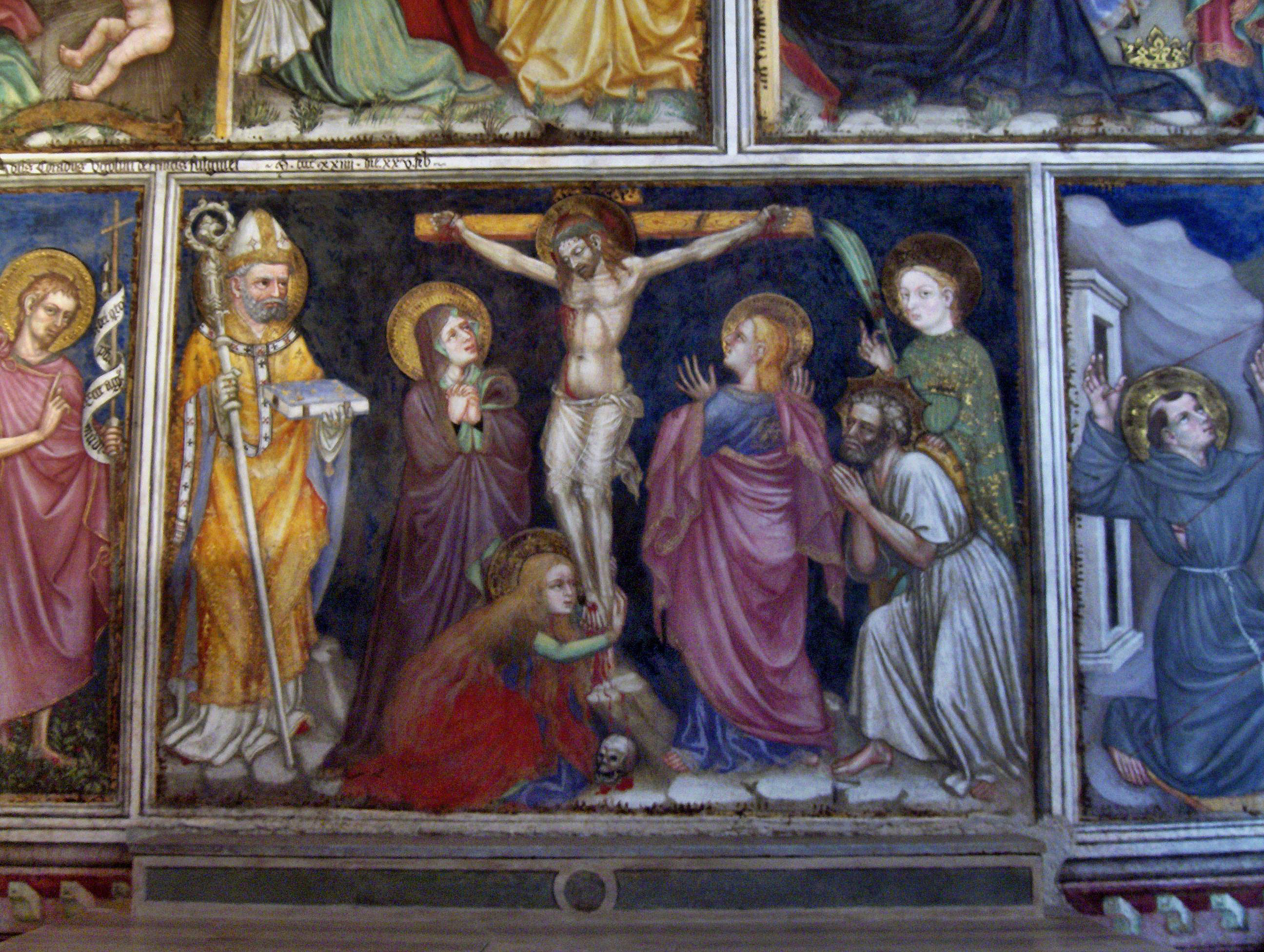
Crucifixion by Ottaviano Nelli.

The loggia is decorated with frescoes describing the legend of the "Founding of Rome". These frescoes are already mentioned in documents dating from 1405. They depict: The Vestal Virgin Rhea Silvia who gives in to the love of the god Mars; the Birth of Romulus and Remus; Faustulus brings the twins to his wife Acca Larentia; Rhea Silvia, the Siege of Alba Longa, the Twins and the King Amulius. Each episode is explained below by verses in Italian. Through these frescoes, the Trinci family tried to provide an acceptable lineage of their ancestors to the founders of Rome. The painter of these frescoes is anonymous. His style is certainly different from the styles of the frescoes in the other rooms of the palace. He paints with almost monochromatic colors and has a great sense of anecdotal narrative. These reveal a certain similarity with the Master of the Life of St. Benedict (partly in the Uffizi, Florence, and part in the Museo Poldi Pezzoli, Milan).

The small chapel is entirely decorated with frescoes (1421- February 1424) by Ottaviano Nelli, describing in sixteen scenes the life of the Virgin : Anna and Joachim in the Temple, annunciation to Joachim and Anna, meeting at the Porta Aurea, birth of Mary, marriage to Joseph, Annunciation, Nativity, Adoration of the Magi, presentation of Jesus in the Temple, announcement of the death of Mary, arrival of the apostles, death of Mary, funeral and Assumption. The fresco of the Crucifixion above the altar shows also the archbishop Jacobus de Voragine with his book the Golden Legend in his hand. This fresco is flanked by frescoes of three saints (one of them is the blessed Paoluccio Trinci, who died in September 1390) and St. Francis, receiving the Stigmata. Many of these palace chapels were dedicated to Mary in the 13th to the 15th centuries. These frescoes were commissioned by Corrado III Trinci who resumed the policy of his father as a patron of the Arts. These religious frescoes are a rare set that show at the same time a humanistic and profane iconography.

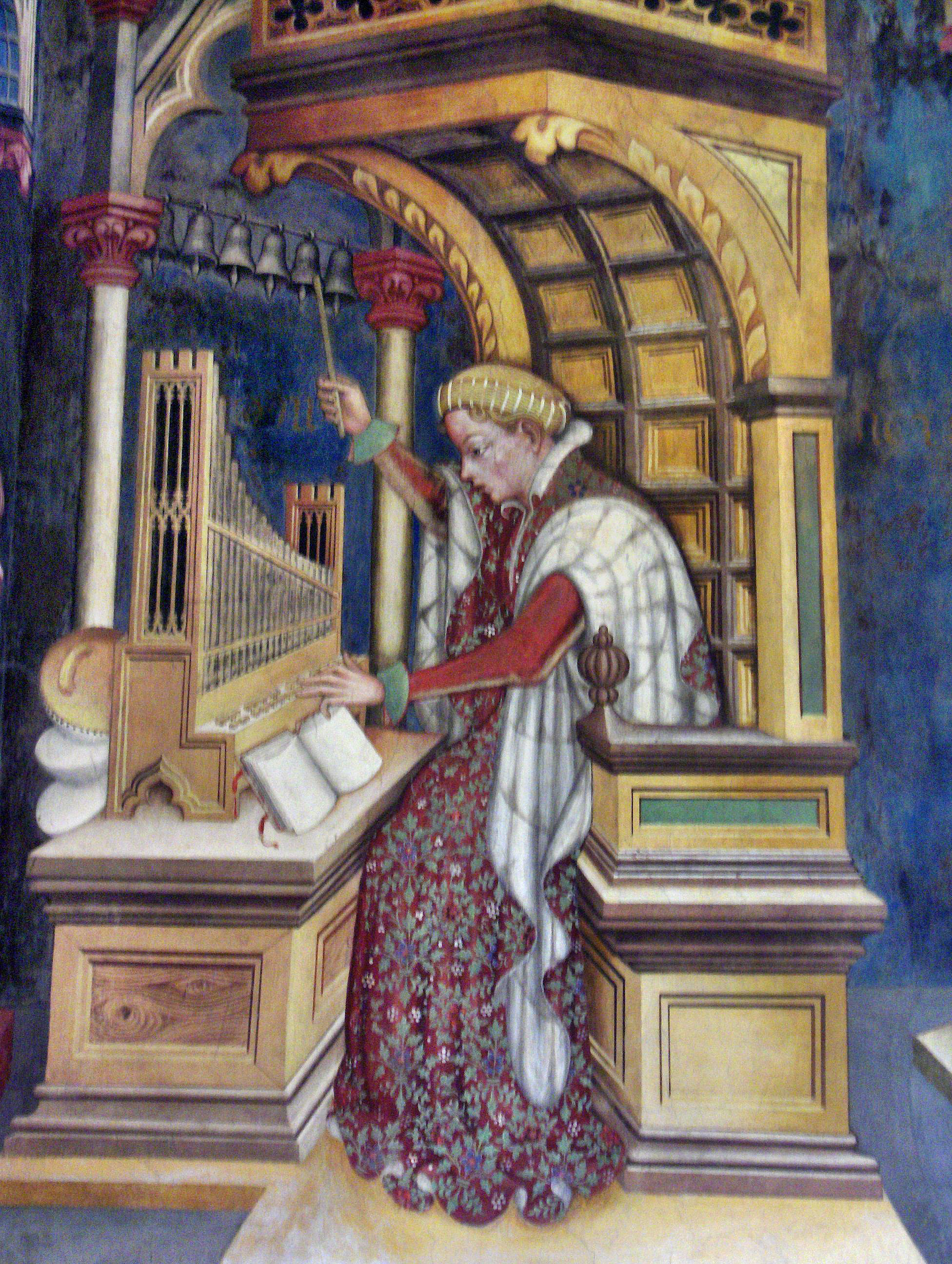
The Liberal Arts: Music

The Hall of Liberal Arts and of the Planets (or Hall of Stars) takes its name because its frescoes represent the Liberal Arts : the Trivium (grammar, rhetoric, logic and philosophy) and the Quadrivium (music, geometry, astronomy, and arithmetics) and the planets: (Moon, Mars, Mercury, Jupiter, Venus, Saturn and the Sun - the latter two are missing) The other side of the room shows the different Ages of Man (infancy, childhood, adolescence, youth, adulthood, deterioration, old age, decrepitude) and the Hours of the Day. The former name of the room was "Chamber of the Rose", probably because of the presence of roses, emblem of Trinci family, in its decorative top. The hall represents iconographically the best of medieval culture. There are seven planets, as there are seven ages of man, each under the influence of a planet. This influence of the planets is stronger in certain times of day, as man learns in each age another discipline. The provision of the planetary system does not conform to the actual position of planets in the heavens, but follows a chronological trend that relates to the day of the week.

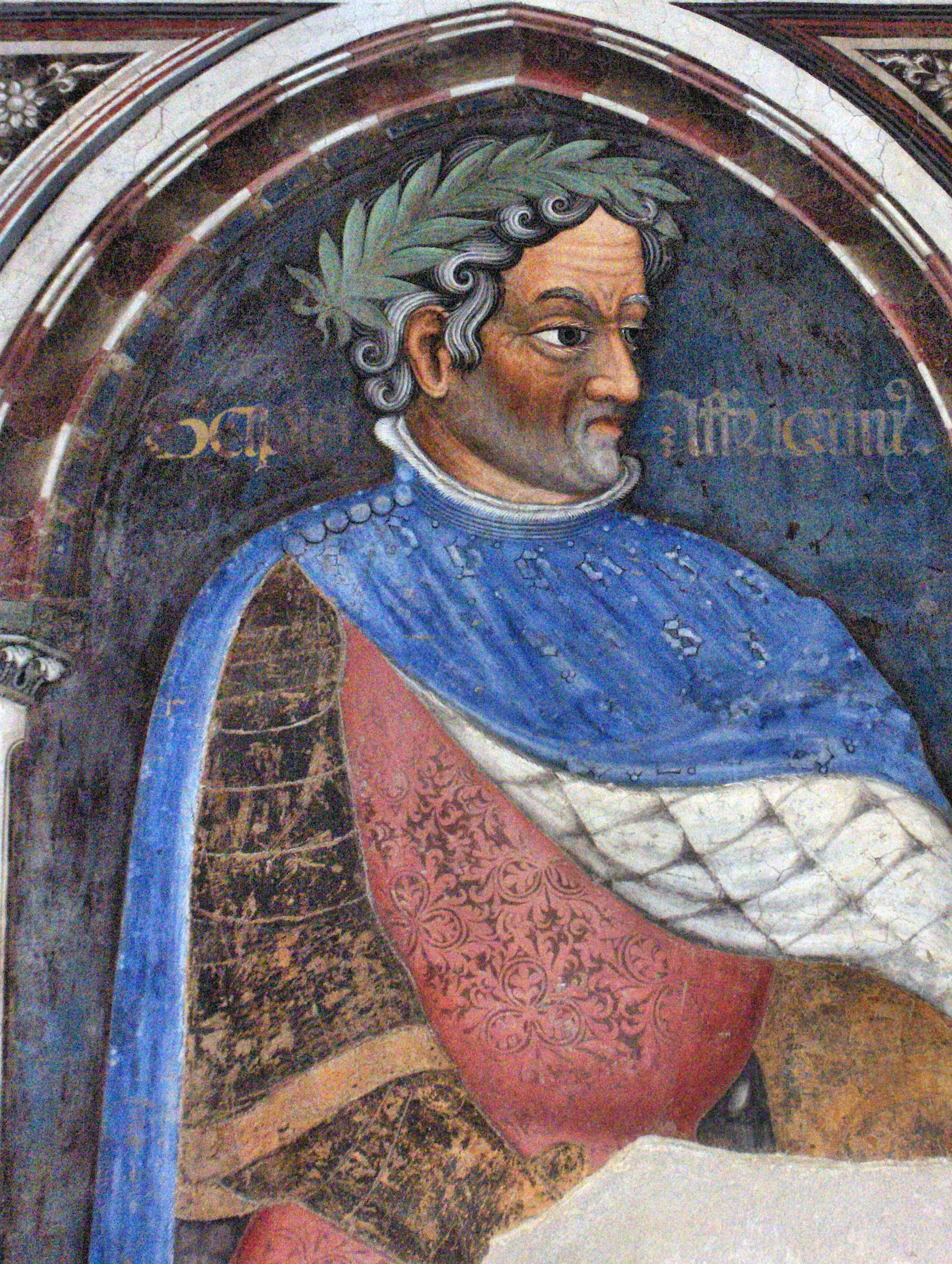
Scipio Africanus

The impressive frescoes in the Hall of the Emperors or the Hall of the Giants represent the leaders, heroes and emperors of Ancient Rome, sumptuously dressed in Renaissance clothes. The practice of decorating palace walls with a series of famous men was widely known during the Middle Ages and lasted well into the 16th century. These paintings were meant to enhance the glory and the importance of the owner of the palace. These frescoes, executed in Late Gothic style, were already mentioned in a document dating 1417. They represent Romulus, Julius Caesar (lost), emperor Augustus, Tiberius, Lucius Furius Camillus, Gaius Fabricius Luscinus, Manus Curius Dentatus, Titus Manlius Torquatus, Cincinnatus, Marcus Marcellus, Scipio Africanus, Muzius Sceva, Cato the Younger, Gaius Marius, Publius Decius, Nero, Fabius Maximus, Caligula, Pompey and Trajan (the last three are lost). Each figure is illustrated by a Latin epigram. All, except Caligula, are positive models. These frescoes relate to the style of Ottaviano Nelli.

The concept of these frescoes came from the humanist Francesco da Fiano (1350 ca.-1421), who was inspired by the model of ancient biographies of famous men (De viris illustribus) by Petrarch, used in the decoration (today lost) in the great hall of the palace of the Carrara (Loggia dei Carraresi) in Padua.

Some archaeological artifacts are also on exhibition in this room, most notably a marble slab showing a quadriga race in the Circus Maximus, Rome.

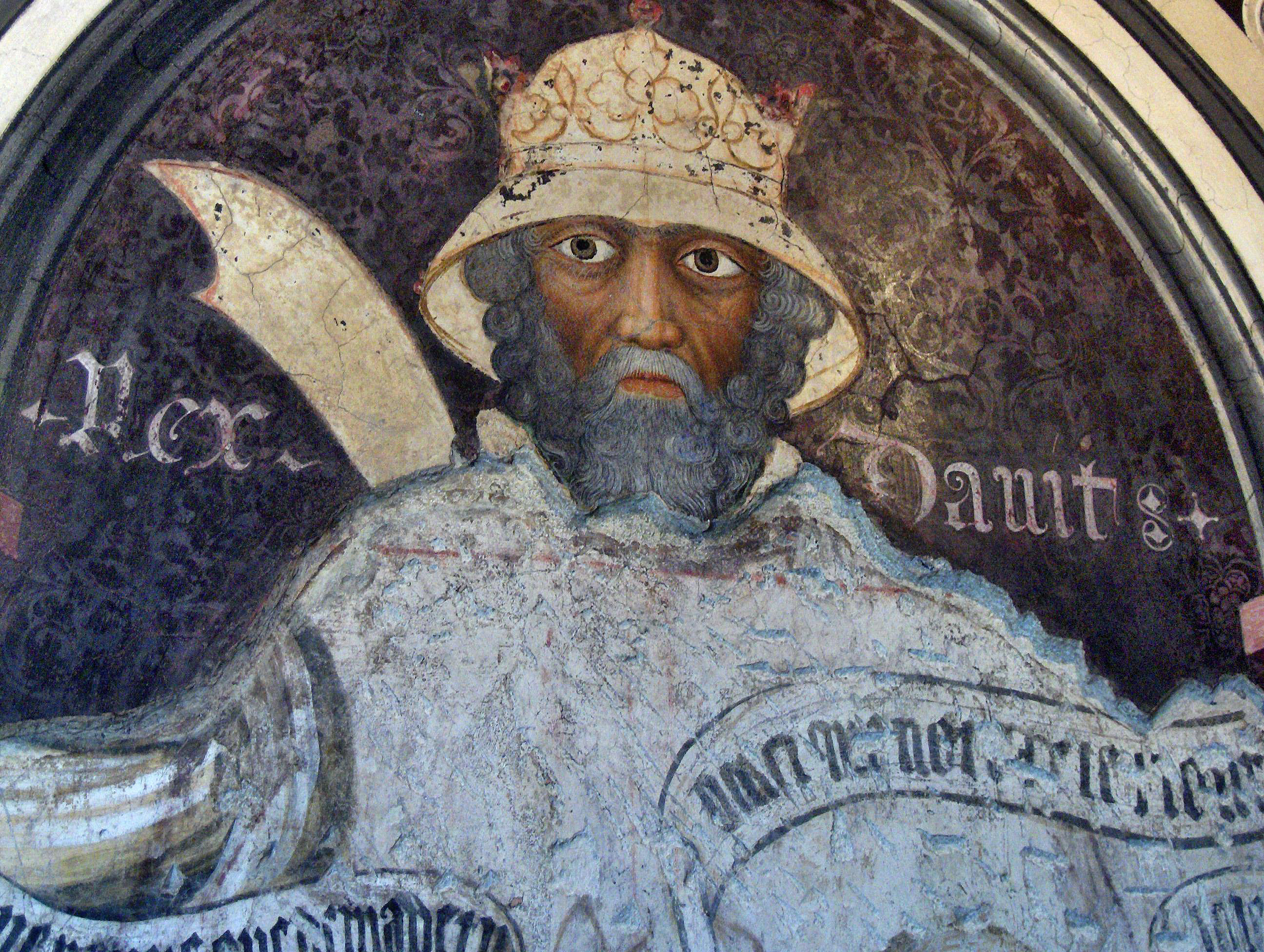
King David, as one of the Nine Worthies

The Hall of Sixtus IV was originally a vast open room without roofing. In 1476 pope Sixtus IV stayed for a short time in this palace, while Rome was afflicted with the plague. The pontiff's emblem can still be seen on the wooden ceiling of this hall and of the Hall of the Emperors. The Hall of Sixtus IV was redecorated during the reign of pope Paul III Farnese (1535-1546), most probably by the painters Lattanzio Pagani and his gifted assistant Dono Doni. The frieze with mythological stories can be attributed to them. The hall of Sixtus IV is an important example of the new Mannerist style of Giorgio Vasari that has undergone a Roman influence.

The walls of the corridor, linking the palace with the cathedral of San Feliciano, is frescoed with the Heroes of Ancient Times (Ciclo dei Prodi). These frescoes represent heroes from Roman times (Romulus, Scipio Africanus) and nine heroes from French medieval tradition, the Nine Worthies. These came from Jewish history (Joshua, King David and Judas Maccabeus), pagan history (Hector (lost), Julius Caesar, Alexander the Great) and Christian history (King Arthur, Charlemagne and Godfrey of Bouillon, the last two are lost)
