= Cerreto, Bettona =

Cerreto
- Frazione
- Interactive map of Cerreto
- Country: Italy
- Region: Umbria
- Province: Perugia
- Comune: Bettona
- Elevation: 190 m (620 ft)

Population (2001)
  - Total: 65
- Time zone: UTC+1 (CET)
  - Summer (DST): UTC+2 (CEST)
- Postcode: 06084
- Area code: 075

Cerreto is a frazione of the comune of Bettona in the Province of Perugia, Umbria, central Italy. It stands at an elevation of 190 metres above sea level. At the time of the Istat census of 2001 it had 65 inhabitants.
