= Colle, Bettona =

Colle
- Frazione
- Location within Italy
- Coordinates: 43°01′13″N 12°28′39″E
- Country: Italy
- Region: Umbria
- Province: Perugia
- Comune: Bettona
- Elevation: 230 m (750 ft)

Population (2001)
  - Total: 114
- Time zone: UTC+1 (CET)
  - Summer (DST): UTC+2 (CEST)
- Postcode: 06084
- Area code: 075

Colle is a frazione of the comune of Bettona in the Province of Perugia, Umbria, central Italy. It stands at an elevation of 230 metres above sea level. At the time of the Istat census of 2001 it had 114 inhabitants.
