= Niccolò I Trinci =

15th-century Italian nobleman

Niccolò I Trinci (died 10 January 1421) was the Lord of Foligno from 1412, inheriting it from his father, Ugolino III Trinci.

== Early life ==
He fought as condottiero for the Republic of Venice.

== Personal life ==
In 1404, he married Tora da Varano, daughter of Rodolfo III da Varano, Lord of Camerino.

== Death ==
In 1421, the Castellan of Nocera Umbra, Pietro di Rasiglia, suspecting his wife of adultery with Niccolò, invited the whole Trinci family to a hunting party and killed all of them, except the young Corrado, who took revenge for the murder of his relatives, attacking the town and killing the castellan.

Preceded by Ugolino III	Lord of Foligno; 1415–1421; Together with Bartolomeo and Corrado III	Succeeded by Corrado III
