= Bartolomeo Trinci =

Bartolomeo Trinci (died 10 January 1421) was the lord of Foligno from 1415. He succeeded his father Ugolino III Trinci, jointly with his brothers Niccolò and Corrado.

In 1421 the Castellan of Nocera Umbra, Pietro di Rasiglia, who suspected his wife of adultery with Niccolò, invited the whole Trinci family to a hunting party and killed all of them, except the young Corrado, who took revenge by attacking the town and killing the castellan.

However, it was commonly suspected that the young Corrado may have been complicit in the murder of his brothers, in order to become Lord of Foligno. Corrado arrived late to the hunting party to the party, and was made informed of the killing by a farmer, who had accompanied his brother Bartolomeo but then allowed to return to Foligno. In addition, Pietro Rasiglia had just reconfirmed as castellan by Niccolò to the town of Nocera, despite having been previously removed due to his cruelty to villagers, whom he also accused of adultery with his wife.

The revenge was terrible. Braccio da Montone moved against the castle with Corrado Trinci and destroyed it. The count Rasiglia threw himself and his children from the tower of the castle. The sister of Corrado, Elisabetta, was also Braccio's lover. Their son, Braccio (1426- 1469), after the killing of Fortebraccio in 1424 and his son Oddo in 1425, was hidden, with the mother, in little convent in the mountain above Cascia that belonged to the Sassovivo Abbey, property of the family Trinci.

Braccio's son was renamed Bartolomeo in memory of the uncle killed by Pietro di Rasiglia and became owner of the convent that change the name after his father (casa di Braccio as is known ever since). The family from Bartolomeo added the last name of Bracci. They also kept the memory of the murder by naming many of their members Bartolomeo for centuries; the last known was Bartolomeo Cesare (died in 1738), born in Rome when the grandfather Bartolomeo moved in 1630.

Preceded by Ugolino III	Lord of Foligno; 1415–1421; Together with Bartolomeo and Corrado III	Succeeded by Corrado III
