= Crispoldus =

Italian Roman Catholic saint

Saint Crispoldus
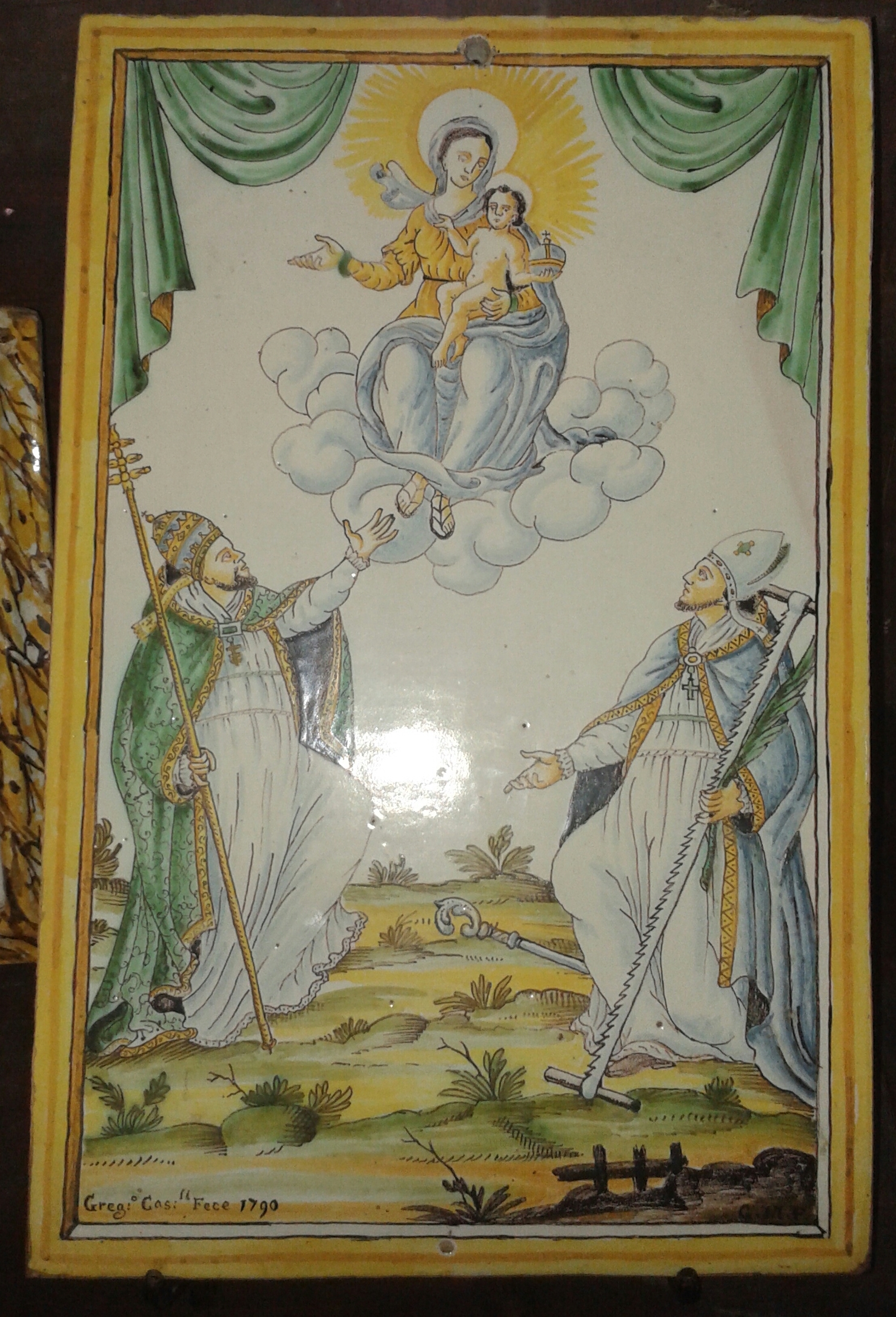
- Crispoldus

Bishop and Martyr
- Born: traditionally Jerusalem
- Died: 1st century Bettona, Italy
- Venerated in: Roman Catholic Church
- Major shrine: Santa Maria Maggiore, Bettona
- Feast: May 12
- Patronage: Bettona

Saint Crispoldus (sometimes Cyspolitus, Crispoltus, Chrysopolitus, Italian: San Crispolto, Crispolito, Crispoldo) is venerated as a 1st-century Christian martyr. He is the patron saint of Bettona, in Umbria, and said to have been the first bishop of that city, although the dioceses of Nocera and Foligno also include his name in episcopal lists.

According to a legendary Passio of the 12th century, Crispoldus was a native of Jerusalem and one of the Seventy Disciples; in 58 AD Crispoldus was sent to Italy by Saint Peter to preach Christianity there. Crispoldus traveled to Umbria and performed miracles at the town of Bettona. He was consecrated bishop of Bettona by St. Brictius (Brizio), who was bishop of Massa Martana. Britius is also named as a bishop of Spoleto and of Foligno. According to Giuseppe Cappelletti, Britius may have been a regional bishop, rather than a bishop of a particular diocese, which explains his association with multiple dioceses.

Crispoldus began to preach Christianity in his diocese, but was arrested by soldiers of the Roman Emperor Maximian (250–310). He was tried before the prefect Asterius and invited to sacrifice to the Roman gods. Crispoldus refused, and was killed after being tortured.

At the same time, a man named Barontius (Baronzio) was decapitated for being a Christian. Crispoldus’ sister Tutela, along with twelve other women, attempted to bury Crispoldus and Barontius, but were arrested in the attempt. They also refused to sacrifice to the Roman gods and were put to death. Their martyrdom is said to have occurred on May 12.

Crispoldus' Germanic name makes his connection to the Apostles unlikely and probably legendary.

== Veneration ==
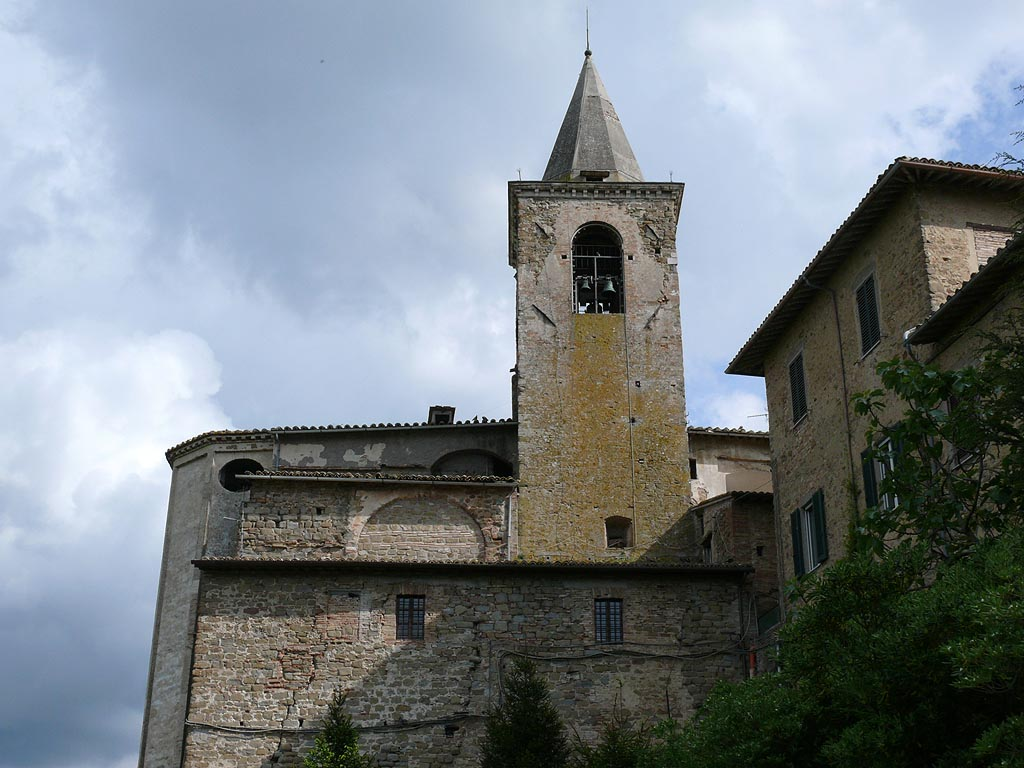
Church of Santa Maria Maggiore, where Crispoldus' relics rest.

A church was built on the site of Crispoldus’ martyrdom in what is now Passaggio di Bettona, a frazione of the Comune of Bettona. Crispoldus is mentioned in a document dating from 1018, found in the archives of Assisi Cathedral.

The church of San Crispolto was built in the 8th century when the remains of the saint were moved inside the walls of the historic center. There the silver and gilded reliquary bust of the saint resides in the transept to the left of the main altar. It was subsequently renovated in the 18th century with a brick facade by Antonio Stefanucci. Originally Benedictine the church was later given to the Franciscan Order. A new church, Santa Maria Maggiore, was built within the walls of Bettona in the 13th century, and was consecrated by Bishop Guido of Bettona in 1225. In 1266, the church became a Benedictine foundation and then became a Franciscan church. The church was restored in 1266 and also in 1797. The most recent renovation was necessary after damage from the 1997 earthquake that damaged the Basilica of San Francesco in Assisi.
