= Corrado II Trinci =

Corrado II (or III) Trinci (died 1386) was the lord of Foligno from 1377 until his death. He was the son of Ugolino II Trinci.

In December 1377 he became lord of Foligno when the people arouse against the Ghibelline government which had killed his brother Trincia a few months before. His son Ugolino succeeded him after his death in 1386.

Preceded by Republic	Lord of Foligno; 1377–1386	Succeeded by Ugolino III
