= Passaggio, Bettona =

Passaggio
- Frazione
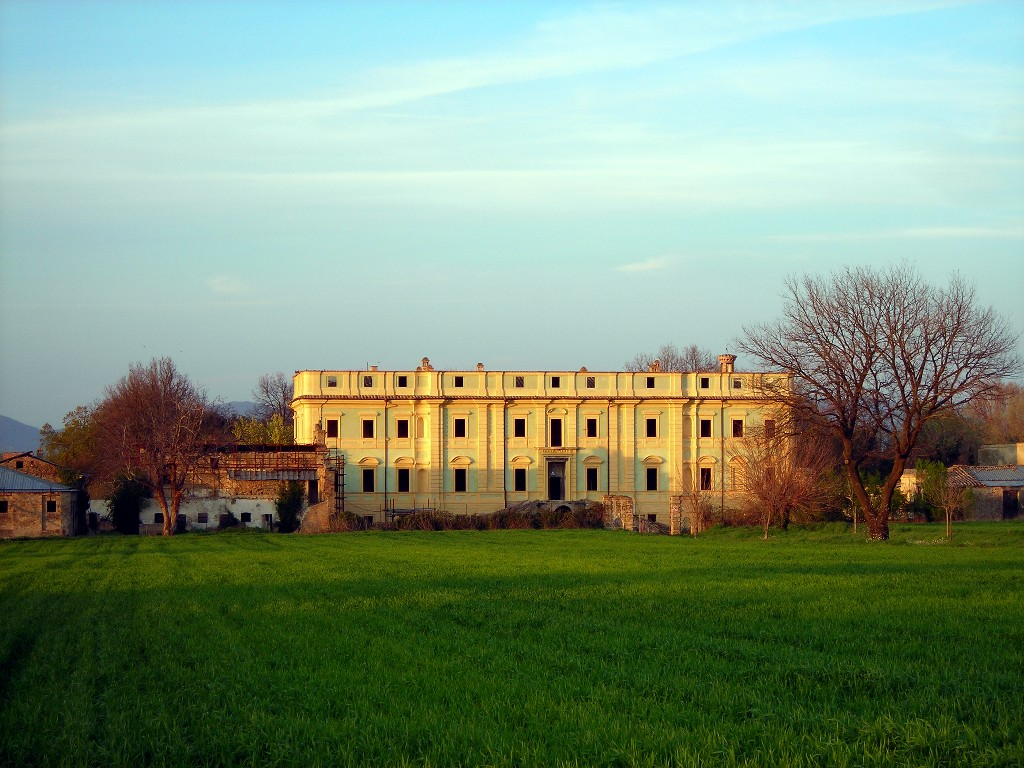
- Villa Boccaglione, in Passaggio

- Location within Italy
- Coordinates: 43°01′29″N 12°30′30″E
- Country: Italy
- Region: Umbria
- Province: Perugia
- Comune: Bettona
- Elevation: 202 m (663 ft)

Population (2001)
  - Total: 896
- Time zone: UTC+1 (CET)
  - Summer (DST): UTC+2 (CEST)
- Postcode: 06084
- Area code: 075

Passaggio is a frazione of the comune of Bettona in the Province of Perugia, Umbria, central Italy. It stands at an elevation of 202 metres above sea level. At the time of the Istat census of 2001 it had 896 inhabitants.
