= Ugolino II Trinci =

Ugolino II Trinci (also Ugolino Novello) (died 1353) was the lord of Foligno from 1343 until his death. He was the son of Nallo I Trinci and succeeded his brother Corrado I in the lordship in 1343.

Ugolino was succeeded by his son Trincia. His other sons Corrado and Rinaldo were later, respectively, lord of Foligno and bishop of Foligno.

Preceded by Corrado I	Lord of Foligno; 1343–1353	Succeeded by Trincia II
