= Chiascio =

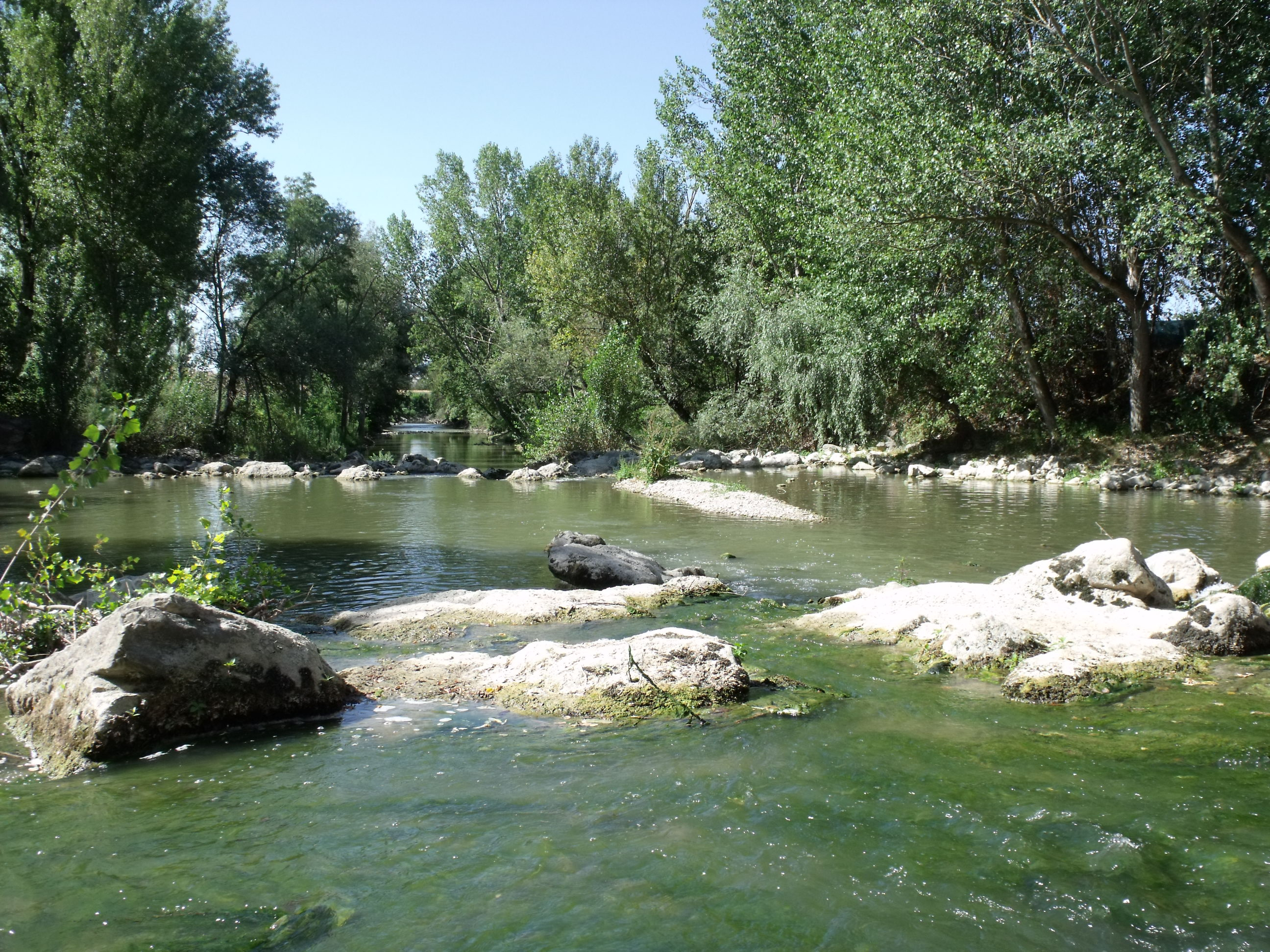
- Chiascio

Location
- Country: Umbria, Italy

Physical characteristics
- Source
  - location: Monte Cucco
  - elevation: 850 m (2,790 ft)
- Mouth: Tiber
  - location: Torgiano
  - coordinates: 43°01′06″N 12°25′50″E
- Length: 95 km (59 mi)
- Basin size: 1,962 km^{2} (758 sq mi)
- Discharge
  - average: 20 m^{3}/s (710 cu ft/s)

Basin features
- Progression: Tiber→ Tyrrhenian Sea

The Chiascio is a river of Umbria, central Italy. It is a left tributary of the Tiber. It is 95 km long, and its drainage basin covers 1962 km^{2}. Its largest tributary is the Topino, which covers 60% of its drainage basin.
