= Museo del vino (Torgiano) =

Museum in Italy

Coordinates: 43.02573°N 12.43343°E

- Established: 1974
- Location: C.so Vittorio Emanuele, 31 Torgiano, Italy
- Director: Maria Grazia Marchetti Lungarotti
- Website: Official website

The Wine Museum of Torgiano (Umbria, Italy) is a private museum, entirely dedicated to the culture of wine. Established in 1974 by Goirgio Lungarotti, founder of the Cantine Lungarotti Winery and his wife, Maria Grazia Marchetti. The museum is situated in a prominent wine-producing area. It is managed by the Lungarotti Foundation, which also oversees the Olive and Oil Museum. The foundation supports research, cultural events and exhibitions that promote the heritage and economic value of wine and olive oil. Through its archaeological, ethnographic and arts collections, the museum provides information on the role of wine in western culture, where wine has always been highly valued not only for its energetic and strengthening properties but also as a cultural product.

== The collections ==
The collection is arranged in thematic areas. "In each room a number of fine and often rare objects illustrate a particular subject area, suggesting connections with other themes that enrich the overall picture".
The first room explains the Middle-East roots of viticulture and its spread to the Mediterranean basin, through several pieces of archaeology from the Bronze Age to the late-ancient era, with particular attention to Etruscan culture. Among the items on display, there is the lip cup attributed to Phrynos Painter, one of the Little masters.
Rooms 2 to 8 show viticulture techniques used in Umbria. Many working tools well illustrate the yearly wine cycle and traditional techniques. A varied section also illustrates places and ways of wine consumption. The basement is home to a large room dedicated to winemaking, with large presses, distillers, a bottling machine and other objects. Room 6 shows how Vin Santo is made.
The itinerary follows, illustrating crafts related to wine (coopers, smiths, etc.) and a large collection of tools.
Room 8 describes regulations about harvesting time, usage and trade of wine, to pass to local handicraft and viniculture in rooms 9 and 10.
Rooms 11 to 15 are dedicated to pottery, with a rich collection of ceramics coming from the most prestigious pottery-producing regions of Italy. The collection of pottery is arranged according to the following thematic division: “wine as food” (measures, bottles, etc.), “wine as a medicine” (jars, mortars, pharmaceutical containers, books, etc.) and finally “wine and mythology” (symbolic and story-telling decorations mainly related to Dionysos/Bacchus, including works by Mastro Giorgio Andreoli and Girolamo della Robbia).
Room 16 boasts the largest existing collection of irons for wafer in Umbria, usually served with Vin Santo.
Room 17 hosts a rich collection of approximately 600 engravings and sketches, depicting dionysian scenes with pictures by authors like Mantegna, Piranesi, and Picasso.
Room 18 is dedicated to ex libris.
The visit ends in room 19, where fiction and non-fiction ancient books about wine are displayed.

== Bibliography ==
- Alessandra Uncini and Mario Torelli, Museo del vino di Torgiano. Materiali archeologici, Perugia, Electa Editori Umbri Associati, 1991
- Carola Fiocco, Gabriella Gherardi, Museo del vino di Torgiano. Ceramiche, Perugia, Electa Editori Umbri Associati, 1991
- Cristina Gnoni Mavarelli, Museo del vino di Torgiano. Incisioni, Perugia, Electa Editori Umbri Associati, 1994
- Fondazione Lungarotti, The Wine Museum. Guidebook, Perugia, 1995
- Maria Grazia Marchetti Lungarotti, Mario Torelli, Wine. Mithology and culture, Milano, Skirà Editore, 2006
