= Trincia II Trinci =

Trincia II (or I) Trinci (died 18 September 1377) was lord of Foligno, in central Italy, from 1353; he was the son of Ugolino Novello Trinci.

His initial titles were gonfaloniere del popolo and capitano del popolo, but was recognized as apostolic vicar (at the time Foligno was namely part of the Papal States). He was also vicar of Bevagna starting from 1371, as well as Papal commander and gonfaloniere of the Duchy of Spoleto. He married Giacoma d'Este, daughter of Niccolò I d'Este, lord of Ferrara.

He was assassinated at Foligno on 18 September 1377 during a Ghibelline uprising, from which a short-lived republic arose. One of his sons, Ugolino, was later lord of Foligno.

== See also ==
- Trinci
- Foligno
- Wars of the Guelphs and Ghibellines

Preceded by Ugolino II	Lord of Foligno; 1353–1377	Republic
