= Museo dell'olivo e dell'olio =

Olive oil and culture museum in Italy

Coordinates: 43.02526°N 12.43455°E

- Established: 2000
- Location: Via Garibaldi, 10 Torgiano, Italy
- Director: Maria Grazia Marchetti Lungarotti
- Website: Official website

The Museo dell'olivo e dell'olio (Olive and oil Museum) is a private museum located in Torgiano (Umbria, Italy) specialized in olive oil and olive culture and knowledge. Its premises are in an ancient oil mill, which worked till the 1960s.
Its rich collections of fine arts and material culture provides well-documented information on oil production and olive-growing, traditional uses and symbolism on oil and olives.

== History ==
The museum is owned by Cantine Lungarotti Winery and run by the Lungarotti Foundation, which opened it in 2000 and is part, together with the Torgiano Wine Museum, of the official network of museums in Umbria.

== The Museum ==
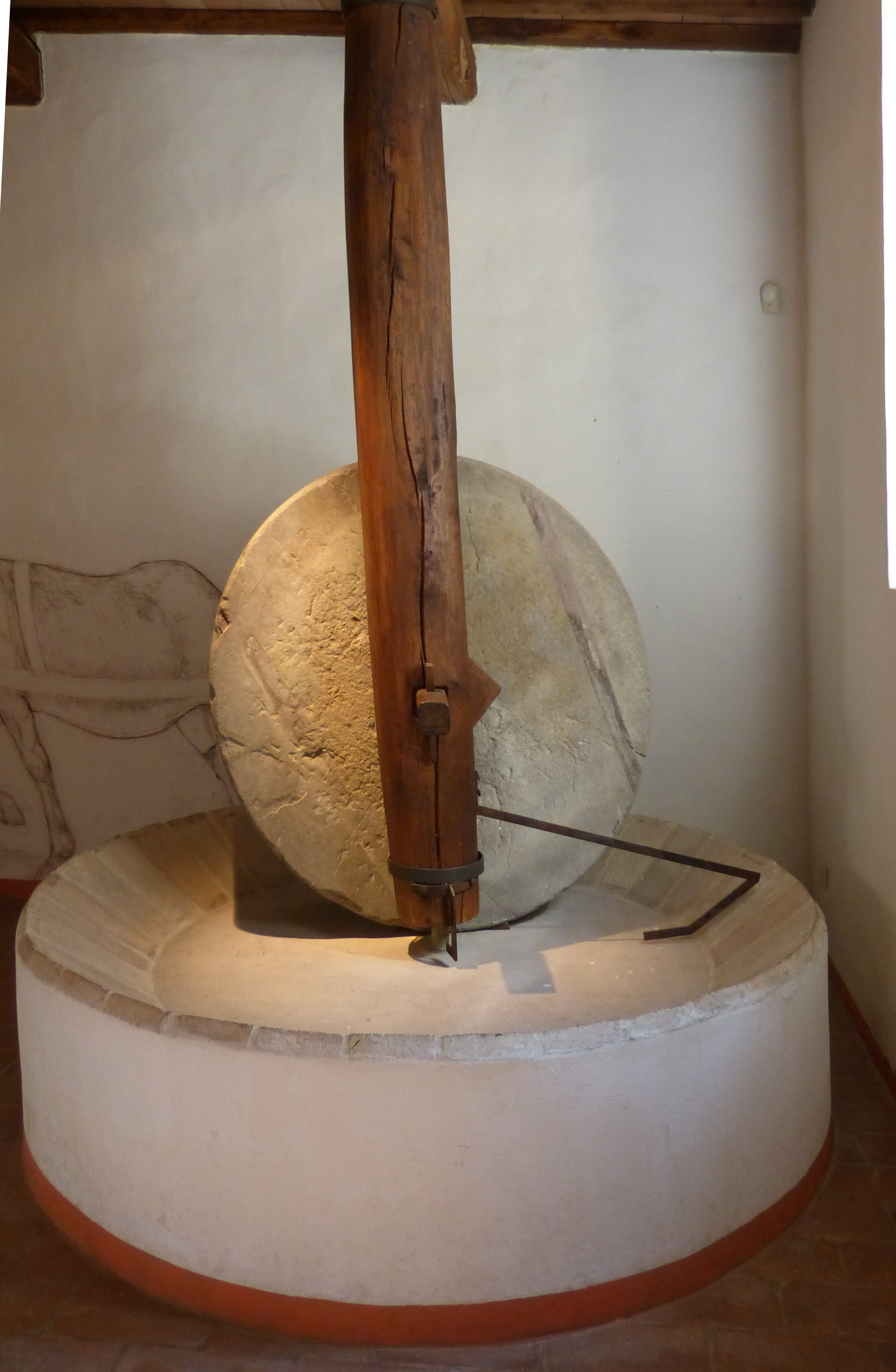
Olive oil mill in Olive and oil Museum, Torgiano

The itinerary is made up of 11 rooms, dealing with different aspects of oil and olive trees. It begins with scientific information on olive trees: its botanic features and traditional and innovative systems of olive-growing. A millstone with animal traction and a huge millstone with hydraulic traction show, together with pictures and didactic panels, the long evolution in oil extraction techniques.
Mythology related to olive oil is then dealt with. Great attention is paid to the goddess Athena who, according to Greek mythology, offered mankind the first domesticated olive tree. Masterpiece of this section is a red-decorated Attica alabastron (a type of pottery for holding oil) portraying the goddess Athena, ascribable to Foundry Painter (5th century B.C.). Other pieces of the collection are a tribute to Athena's civilizing action (as holder of technological knowledge) as to war, vessels, agriculture and housekeeping.
The third section concerns landscape. Most of Umbria is cultivated with olive trees. Such feature has always impressed travelers and visitors who, during their so-called Grand Tour, would record their emotions and interest in the landscape in their note-books, in sketches or descriptions. This section contains cadastres, maps and other objects recalling such Grand Tour.
The following rooms tell the traditional uses of olive oil: the most ancient (oil as a source of light) is documented through a number of oil lamps from the pre-Classical era to Neoclassicism. The remaining rooms describe how oil has been used in a wide range of sectors: ritual usage in Christianity, Islam and Judaism; usage in sport, food, scents and ointment preparation; sphragistics, weaving and wood-processing.
The last room of the museum gathers a variety of symbolic elements which, over the centuries, have contributed to consider olive oil and olive trees as sacred and gifted of magic and curative power.

== Bibliography ==
- Gian Luigi Bravo, Italiani: il racconto etnografico, Meltemi, Roma, 2001
- Maria Grazia Marchetti Lungarotti, Olive and Oil Museum. Itinerary, Fondazione Lungarotti, Perugia, 2002
- John Train, The Olive. Tree of civilization, Scala Books in associations with Antique Collectors' Club, 2004
