= Torgiano =

- Comune
- Comune di Torgiano
- Coat of arms

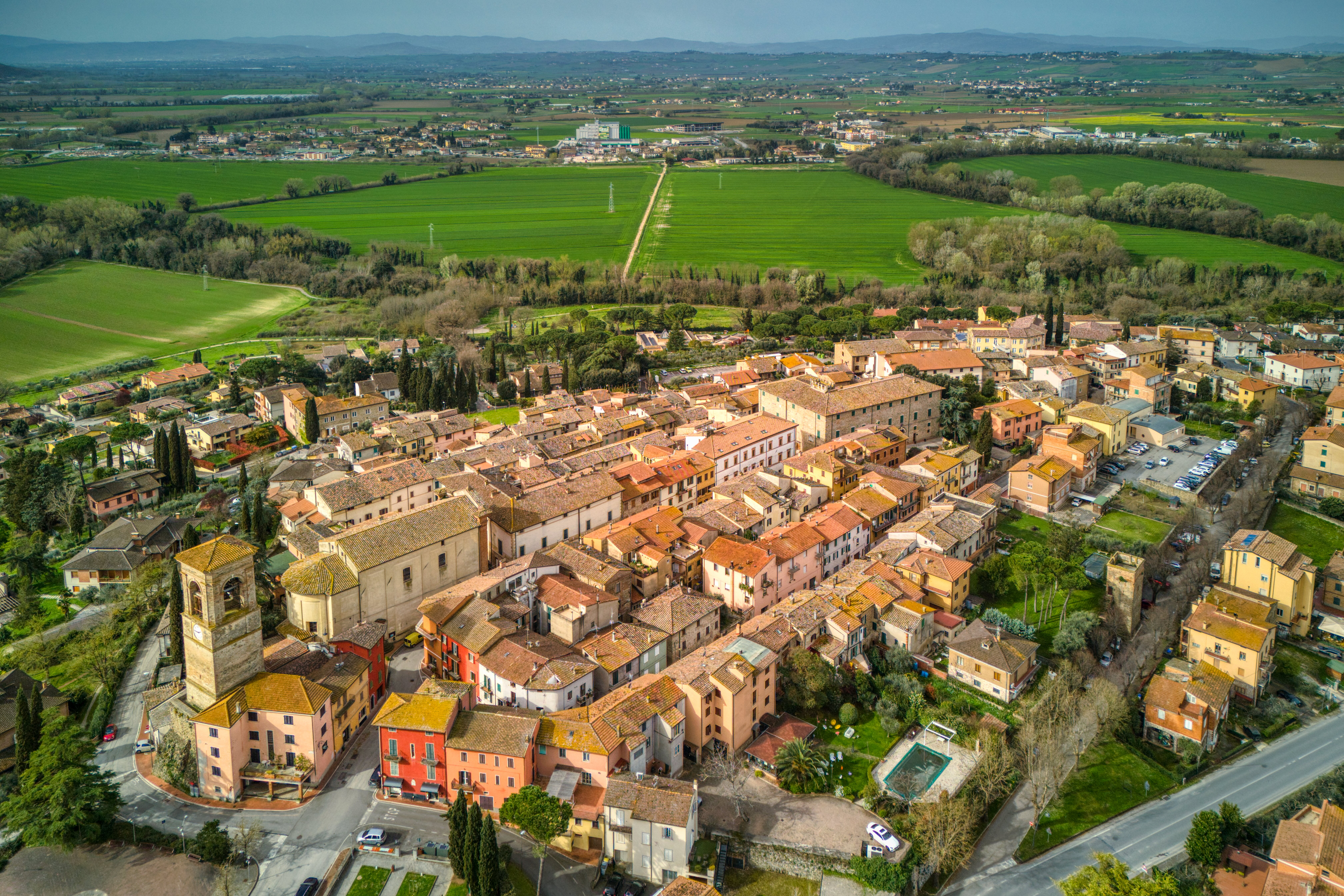

- Location within Italy Location within Umbria
- Coordinates: 43.025631°N 12.433977°E
- Country: Italy
- Region: Umbria
- Province: Perugia (PG)

Government
  - Mayor: Marcello Nasini

Area
  - Total: 37.9 km^{2} (14.6 sq mi)
- Elevation: 219 m (719 ft)

Population (1 January 2025)
  - Total: 6,585
  - Density: 174/km^{2} (450/sq mi)
- Demonym: Torgianesi
- Time zone: UTC+1 (CET)
  - Summer (DST): UTC+2 (CEST)
- Postal code: 06089
- Dialing code: 075
- Website: Official website

Torgiano is a comune (municipality) in the Province of Perugia in the Italian region Umbria, located about 10 km southeast of Perugia.

Torgiano borders the following municipalities: Bastia Umbra, Bettona, Deruta, Perugia. It is one of I Borghi più belli d'Italia ("The most beautiful villages of Italy").

== Etymology ==
The name Torgiano is said to derive from Torre di Giano (tower of Janus).

Alternatively, according to Adone Palmieri, it may refer to three towers once standing in the area, known as Turres Gani. Of these, only one survives, while another forms the base of the bell tower.

== History ==
Archaeological evidence indicates that the area of Torgiano was inhabited during the Roman period, with remains of a villa and various inscriptions attesting to its settlement.

According to local tradition, Torgiano was founded around 300 AD by Lucius Turcius Apronianus. In 596 it was destroyed by the Goths. In the early Middle Ages, the territory was occupied successively by the Goths and the Lombards.

In the 13th century Torgiano was rebuilt and enlarged by the people of Perugia. The town walls were constructed in 1276, together with two gates and two towers, and in 1294 an additional tower in the form of a fortress was built by the Perugians.

In 1410 a fierce battle took place there between the armies of Braccio da Montone and Sforza.

In 1426 Torgiano issued its first statute, which expanded vicariate powers and introduced council oversight of local governance. In 1503 it was invaded by Cesare Borgia, after which it returned to the control of the Baglioni family of Perugia.

After the Salt War in 1540, the town was brought under the authority of the Papal States. After the war, the river Tiber was canalized and joined to the Chiascio.

During the period of the Roman Republic and Napoleonic rule from 1798 to 1814, Torgiano retained municipal status, forming part of the Department of Trasimeno.

Following the Napoleonic era, papal administration was restored, and an apostolic subdelegate oversaw the municipality.

In the mid-19th century Torgiano had a population of 2,669 inhabitants. Of these, 559 lived within the town and 2,110 in the surrounding countryside.

== Geography ==
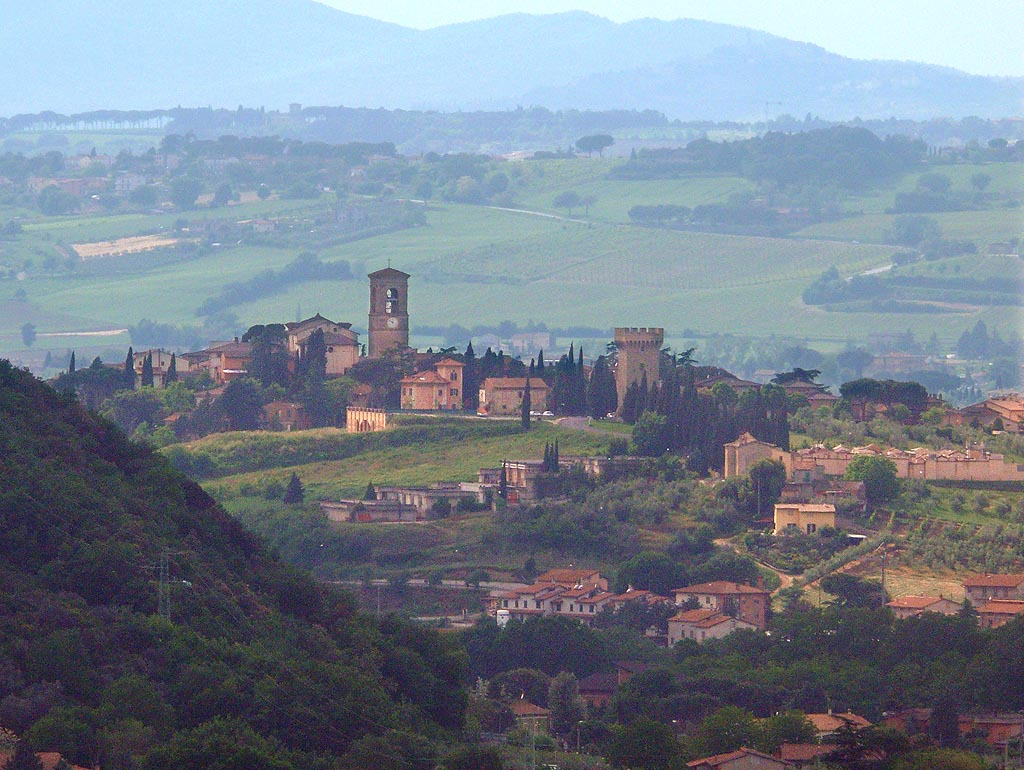
View of Torgiano

Torgiano lies on a hill almost surrounded by the rivers Tiber and Chiascio, which meet at a short distance from the town walls. The climate is described as temperate and mild.

The surrounding area is fertile, producing cereals, vines, and mulberry trees.

=== Subdivisions ===
The municipality includes the localities of Brufa, Cittadella, Ferriera, Fornaci, Miralduolo, Olmone, Pescara, Pontenuovo, Signoria, Torgiano.

In 2021, 917 people lived in rural dispersed dwellings not assigned to any named locality. At the time, the most populous localities were Torgiano proper (2,850), and Brufa (939).

The settlement of Miralduolo stands at the foot of a high hill near the left bank of the Tiber, about 2 miles (3.2 km) north of Torgiano, 4 miles (6.4 km) southeast of Perugia, and 7 miles (11 km) west of Assisi.

Rosciano, formerly a castle, survives as ruins within a dense wood about 2 miles (3.2 km) from Torgiano. The plain below, known as the Piano di Rosciano, is crossed by the Chiascio, which is spanned by a bridge, and near which stood three mills.

== Economy ==
The surrounding territory was described in the 19th century as fertile and well cultivated, producing oil, wine, wheat, and maize, and including abundant pastureland.

=== Wine ===
Torgiano was the first winemaking area in Umbria to obtain the DOC mark (Denomination of Origin) in 1968. In 1990 the Vino Torgiano was also certified as DOCG (Guaranteed Denomination of Origin). The town is a member of the Strada dei Vini del Cantico.

One of the most inventive and progressive winemakers of Torgiano, Giorgio Lungarotti, together with his wife Maria Grazia, set up a foundation and conceived and created the Wine Museum, which opened in 1974 for the first time. The Olive Oil Museum in Torgiano is also part of the Lugarotti foundation.

==== Torgiano DOC ====
The Italian wine DOC around Torgiano produced red and white blends, as well as varietal Cabernet Sauvignon and Chardonnay wines, provided the named grapes account for at least 85% of the wine. Grapes for DOC production are limited to harvest yields of 12 tonnes/ha with finished red wines needing a minimum alcohol level of 12% and finished whites needing at least 10.5% alcohol. The DOC red wines are blends of 50-70% Sangiovese, 15-30% Canaiolo, 10% Trebbiano, and up to 10% of Ciliegiolo and Montepulciano. The whites are blends of 50-70% Trebbiano, 15-35% Grechetto and up to 15% of Malvasia and Verdello.

==== Torgiano Rosso Riserva DOCG ====
Within the DOC 160 ha (499 acres) in the nearby hills received a special designation to produce a DOCG red wine. Grapes designated for this wine are further restricted to 10 tonnes/ha, a minimum alcohol level of 12.5% and must be aged at least 3 years prior to release. The blending components are mostly similar to the DOC wine in regards to the percentages of Sangiovese and Canaiolo but differ in that now collectively Trebbiano, Ciliegiolo and Montepulciano can not account for more than 10% of the blend.

== Religion and culture ==
=== Religious buildings ===
The parish church of San Bartolomeo serves as the principal religious building of Torgiano and is associated with the town's patron saint, whose feast is celebrated on 24 August. The church is described as having an organ.

Other parishes within the territory include that of Sant'Ermete in Brufa and San Rocco in Miralduolo.

Other sights include the oratory of St. Anthony (16th century), with frescos of the Domenico Alfani school.

=== Museo del Vino ===
The Museo del vino is housed in the 17th century Palazzo Graziani-Baglioni and is organized into thematic sections centered on wine. It includes archaeological artefacts such as wine amphorae, jugs and symposium cups, as well as ceramics from the early Middle Ages, and winemaking tools. Notable items include ceramics by Giorgio Andreoli of the 16th century, engravings ranging from Mantegna to Picasso, and an 18th-century monumental winepress.

=== Museo dell'Olivo e dell'Olio ===
The Museo dell'olivo e dell'olio presents the history and uses of the olive tree and olive oil. Among the exhibits is an alabastron, an ancient vessel for perfumed oils dating to the 5th century BC. A significant section is devoted to a collection of lamps ranging from the pre-Roman period to the 20th century. Other sections explore the symbolic role of the olive in visual arts and craftsmanship, as well as popular traditions, beliefs and superstitions.

=== Other cultural heritage ===
The sculpture park in Brufa was established in 1987. The installations extend along the ridge of the hill of Brufa, within the municipality of Torgiano. Among the works installed are those by artists such as Pietro Cascella and Beverly Pepper.

In the past, remains of a thermal structure, inscribed and sculpted marbles, and various other antiquities were discovered in the area.

=== Other sights ===
The ancient part of town is still partly surrounded by medieval walls. The Torre di Guardia, a defensive tower dating back to the 13th century, is situated outside the walls.

=== Events ===
- Gustando il borgo - spring festival (Easter)
- Infiorata del Corpus Domini
- Calici di Stelle - Food and wine review Torgiano, tastings of wine and typical products. - (August, 10 - national winetasting congress (November - December)
- Mostra d'arte “Vaselle d'autore per il vino novello” – festival of the new wine (November)
- Festa dell’Olio Nuovo – festival of the new olive oil (December)

=== Sports ===
There is a town soccer team in Torgiano named AC Torgiano, the soccer team is made up of the children who are residents of the town itself. The boys who play on the team are great friends and include teamwork in their everyday practice.

== Notable people ==
Among figures associated with Torgiano are the Blessed Simone (born 1332); Lucia Terzani, remembered as the wife of Muzio Attendolo Sforza and mother of Francesco Sforza; and the 13th-century military figure Tartaglia, described as a renowned captain.

Other people originating from Torgiano include Rina Gatti, a writer; and Ciro Scarponi, a composer and clarinetist.

Also from Torgiano is Giorgio Lungarotti, a winemaker known for his role in the development of viticulture in the area.

Giuseppe Ugolini, a member of the Carabinieri, is also among the notable people from Torgiano.
