= Ugolino III Trinci =

Ugolino III Trinci (died 1415) was Lord of Foligno in the early 15th century.

The son of Trincia II Trinci, he was justice gonfalonier and "Captain of the People" of Foligno from 1386, succeeding to his brother Corrado, and receiving the title of Papal vicar from the Pope in 1405. He was married with Costanza Orsini, daughter of Aldobrandino Orsini, count of Pitigliano.

Ugolino was a friend of the condottiero Braccio da Montone, who held the nearby Perugia since 1416. He also renovated the famous Palazzo Trinci in Foligno.

His sons Niccolò, Bartolomeo and Corrado succeeded him in the lordship.

Preceded by Corrado II	Lord of Foligno; 1386–1415	Succeeded by Niccolò, Bartolomeo and Corrado III
