= Corrado III Trinci =

Italian lord (fl. 1421–1441)

Corrado III (or IV) Trinci (fl. 1421 – 14 June 1441) was lord of Foligno from 1421 until 1439.

Trinci, a partisan of the Ghibelline forces, ruled Foligno along with his brothers Niccolò and Bartolomeo, until the latter two were assassinated by the castellan of Nocera Umbra. Corrado Trinci took his revenge by attacking the town and killing the castellan.

Initially a fierce enemy of the Pope, Trinci was known for plundering monasteries. Attacked by Francesco I Sforza, however, he obtained the title of vicar of Foligno and Nocera Umbra from Pope Martin V. After this appointment, Trinci was sent to recapture Perugia, held at the time by Oddo Fortebracci. By 1428, however, he again had rebelled against the Church.

Peace with Rome was restored by 1435, but Trinci maintained his control of Montefalco. When Trinci favored the rebellion of Piero Tomacelli in Spoleto, Pope Eugene IV sent Cardinal Giovanni Vitelleschi to dethrone him. The siege of Foligno ended in 1439, when he was betrayed by the population and taken prisoner. He died in the castle of Soriano, strangled along with his two sons.

== Sources ==
- Dorio (1638). Istoria della famiglia Trinci. Foligno.

Preceded by Ugolino	Lord of Foligno; 1415–1439; Together with Niccolò and Bartolomeo until 1421	To the Papal States
