= Santa Maria Infraportas, Foligno =

Church in Umbria, Italy

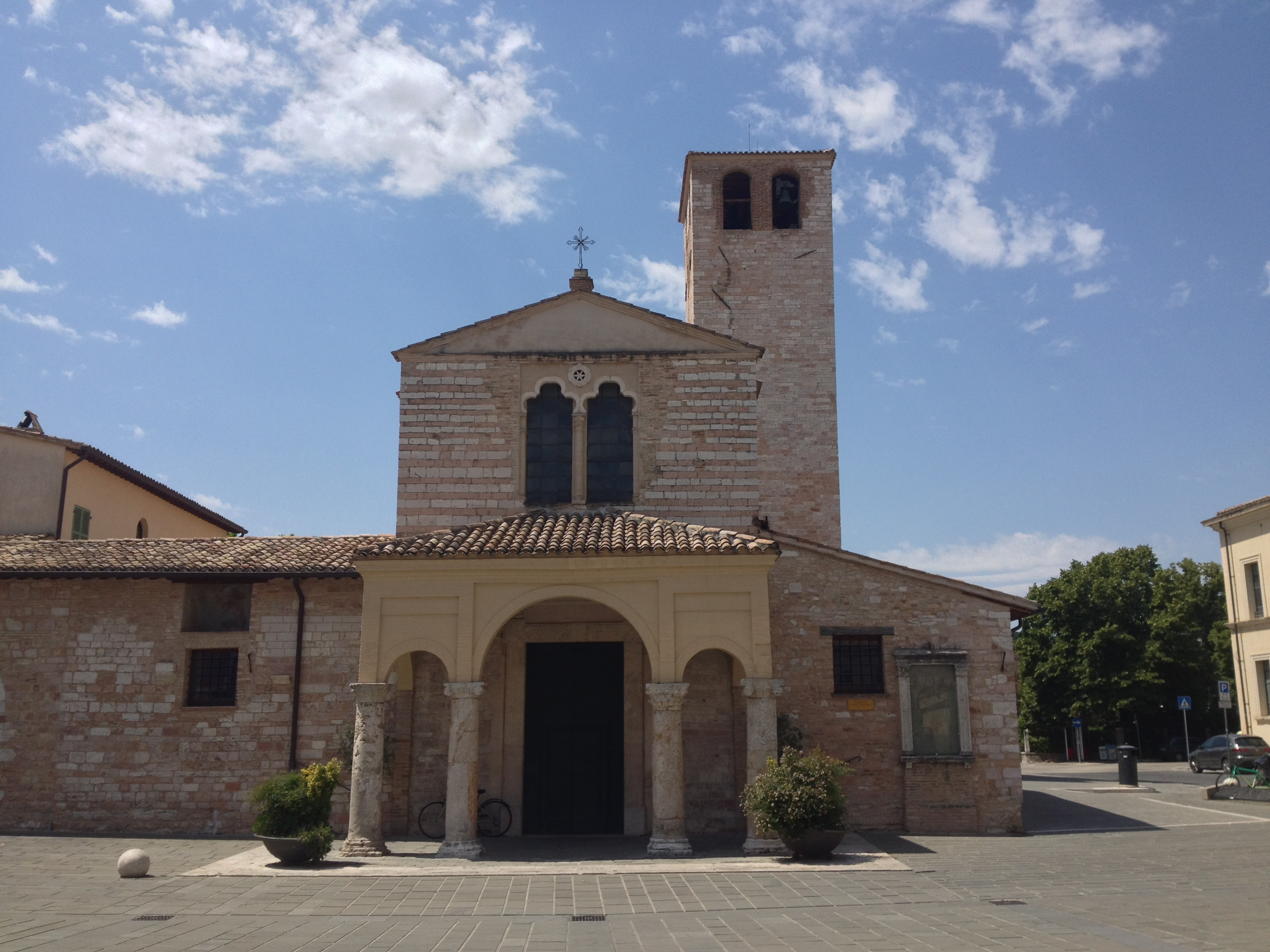
Santa Maria Infraportas, Foligno

Santa Maria Infraportas is a medieval church and chapel in Foligno, Italy.

The site once hosted a hospital (1087) and a church (1207), dedicated to the Virgin Mary and titled foris Portam due to their location outside the city gate. With the reconstruction of the walls around a larger town in the 13th-century, the church was renamed Infraportas, for its position between the old and new gates. The chapel of the Assunta (Madonna after Assumption), to the left of the facade, is the oldest part of the structure and may date to the 7th or 8th century. Tradition holds that St Crispolitus, a disciple of St Peter and the first bishop of Foligno and Bettona, consecrated the church in 58 AD.

The structures have undergone many reconstructions over the centuries. The church and chapel are notable for their collection of medieval frescoes, including works by Pierantonio and Bernardino Mezzastris, Marco di Paolo, Pietro di Domenico da Perugia, Giovanni di Corraduccio called il Mazzaforte, Niccolò di Liberatore called l’Alunno, Cristoforo di Jacopo, and Ugolino di Gisberto.
