= Bernardino Mezzastris =

Italian painter

Bernardino (or Belardino) Mezzastris (or Mezastris) (ca. before 1539) was an Italian painter of the Umbrian School, from Foligno in Umbria, Italy. He was a minor artist: some of his frescoes on religious subjects survive, but garnered little critical acclaim. He should not be confused with the much more important Pier Antonio Mezzastris, another fresco artist at the time and possible relative.

== Relatives ==
Bernardino Mezzastris is thought to be the son of Pier Antonio Mezzastris (ca. 1430-1506) who was an influential painter. Furthermore, likely relatives include Onofria Mezzastris, his aunt, Bartolomeo di Tommaso, his presumed uncle-in-law, and Paolo Nocchi, his possible great-uncle.

== Works ==
Like the works of his presumed father, Pier Antonio Mezzastris, most of Bernardino’s fresco paintings involved various Christian figures and saints. Many of Bernardino's frescoes and paintings are damaged, and only two are known to be signed by him. Detached frescoes are now located in the Pinacoteca Civica museum of Foligno.

=== Signed Works ===
- Madonna and Child with angels in a rose garden, in the church of S. Illuminata of Montefalco, signed and dated 1507
- Fresco in the Chiesa Tonda of Spello, signed and dated 1533
- Painted niche in S. Illuminata, signed and dated 1529. This painted niche was commissioned by The Commune, after the cessation of a disease outbreak. This fresco depicts God above two angels, lifting a cloth of honour. Inside of the niche, there was intended to be a statue of the archangel Raphael; it currently houses a 15th-century wooden statue of St Nicolas of Tolentino.

=== Attributed Works ===
- St Amicus, dated 1508
- Crucifixion, dated 1525. This fresco depicts the crucifixion of Jesus Christ accompanied by the Virgin Mary and St John the Baptist.
- St Roch, estimated 16th century

== Bibliography ==
- Raimond van Marle, The development of the Italian schools of painting, Volume 14, Hacker Art Books, 1970, p. 86.
- Key to Umbria, Foligno | Pierantonio Mezzastris
- Key to Umbria, Foligno | Bernardino Mezzastris
