= San Giovanni Profiamma =

Parish in Foligno, Italy

Coordinates: 42°58′57″N 12°43′22″E

San Giovanni Profiamma is a civil parish in the municipality of Foligno in the province of Perugia, which is also an active bishopric, and is the historical site of the former Roman town and bishopric of Foro Flaminii, which remains a Latin Catholic titular see as Foro Flaminio. It is in the circoscrizione no. 6: San Giovanni Profiamma-Belfiore-Vescia-Capodacqua-Pontecentesimo.

The area belonging to the parish extends up to the plain between the Via Flaminia and the right bank of the Topino. San Giovanni Profiamma is at an altitude of 260 metres (850 ft) above sea level, 4 km northeast of Foligno. In 2021, it had a population of 1,356.

== History ==
The Roman town of Forum Flaminii, corresponding with modern San Giovanni Profiamma, was founded by Roman censor Gaius Flaminius in 220 BCE during the construction of the Roman consular road. The town is attested as a bishopric since the third century and believed to have been destroyed in 740 by the invading Lombards under King Liutprand, and subsequently incorporated into Foligno.

It remains unknown how much of the relatively old vita of the legendary first bishop and patron saint Felician of Foligno is historically accurate.

Only two bishops were historically documented :

- Bonifatius, attending the council held by Pope Symmachus in 501 or 502[3], which forbade alienating church property; Bonifacio signed the acts in 51º position, between bishops Venerioso of Spello and Sebastiano of Sora.
- Decentius took part in the Roman council of 680, held by Pope Agatho to condemn Monothelitism as heresy, signing between a bishops Floro of Foligno and Giovanni of Norcia.

From a papal bulla by Pope Innocent II in 1138, on the jurisdiction of the (heir) bishops of Foligno, citing plebs S. Joannis de Foroflamini cum ecclesiis suis, Sbaraglia deduces Forum Flaminii's Ancient cathedral would have been dedicated to Saint John.

== Titular see ==
In 1966, the diocese was nominally restored as the Titular bishopric of Foro Flaminii (Latin) / Forflamme (Curiate Italian), and renamed in 1990 to Forum Flaminii (Latin) / Foro Flaminio (Curiate Italian) / Foroflaminien(sis) (Latin adjective).

It has had the following incumbents:

- Pietro Gazzoli (1968.02.03 – death 1990.02.17) as Auxiliary Bishop of Diocese of Brescia (Italy) (1968.02.03 – retired 1983.08.06) and as emeritus
- Angelo Mascheroni (1990.06.09 – ...) as Auxiliary Bishop of Archdiocese of Milano (Milan, Italy) (1990.06.09 – retired 2005.01.10) and as emeritus.

== Monuments and places of interest ==
The church of San Giovanni Battista, or the Palatine Basilica, is a Romanesque basilica cathedral built on the ruins of a 6th-century basilica. The façade is notable for its rose window and finely carved portal. The interior, with a single nave, features Roman murals and a sixth-century sarcophagus. The crypt, with three aisles, contains an eighth-century architrave decorated with early Christian symbols. Originally the seat of a diocese, it survives as a titular see.

== Economy and activities ==
San Giovanni Profiamma is home to the cultivation of olives, for the production of high-quality olive oil, and also has an extensive industrial area.

The town has an annual Sagra della Rocciata (festival of the Rocciata), celebrating a regional dessert. There is also the annual "Giostra della Quintanella" (Joust of Quintanella) where over 350 children from the eight districts compete in a Palio: they cycle along a figure-eight track with lances, trying to spear rings connected to a statue. The event is connected with a procession in seventeenth-century costumes and a regional market.

== See also ==
- List of Catholic dioceses in Italy

== Bibliography ==
- Ferdinando Ughelli & Nicola Coletti, Italia sacra, vol. X, Venice 1722, col. 101
- Giuseppe Cappelletti, Le Chiese d'Italia dalla loro origine sino ai nostri giorni, Venice 1846, vol. IV, p. 445
- Pius Bonifacius Gams, Series episcoporum Ecclesiae Catholicae, Verlag Karl W. Hiersemann, Leipzig 1931, p. 727
- Michele Faloci Pulignani, L'Umbria sacra del padre Sbaraglia, in Archivio per la storia ecclesiastica dell'Umbria, I (1913), p. 569
- Francesco Lanzoni, Le diocesi d'Italia dalle origini al principio del secolo VII (an. 604), vol. I, Faenza 1927, pp. 451–453
- Pietro Burchi, lemma 'Feliciano, protovescovo di Forum Flaminii, Santo Martire', in Bibliotheca Sanctorum V, coll. 597-600
