= Federico Frezzi =

Most Reverend Federico Frezzi
- Bishop of Foligno
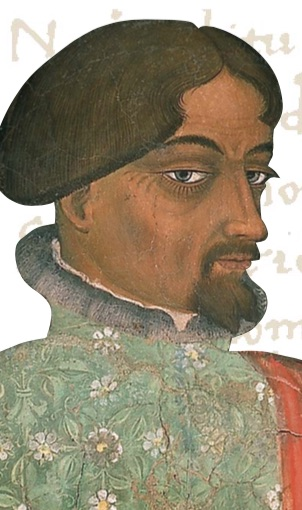
- Federico Frezzi
- Church: Catholic Church
- Diocese: Diocese of Foligno
- In office: 1403–1416
- Predecessor: Onofrio Trinci
- Successor: Niccolò Ferragatti

Orders
- Consecration: 16 November 1403

Personal details
- Born: Foligno, Papal States
- Died: 1416 Konstanz, Holy Roman Empire

Federico Frezzi (Foligno, 14th century – Konstanz, 1416) was an Italian poet and bishop.

== Biography ==
Born in Foligno, Frezzi entered the Dominican order and studied in Florence. He became professor of theology at the universities of Florence, Pisa, and Bologna and gathered various important positions in church.

Between 1394 and 1403 he wrote his Quadriregio, a long didactic epic in 74 canti of terza rima, describing—clearly under Dante's influence—the journey from sin to salvation through the realms of Love, Satan, the Vices and the Virtues, under the guidance of Cupid and then Minerva.

In 1403 Frezzi became bishop of Roman Catholic Diocese of Foligno. He took part to the council of Constance. He died in Konstanz during the Council in 1416.

== Modern editions ==
- Frezzi, Federico. Il Quadriregio, ed. Enrico Filippini. Bari: Laterza, 1914.

== Bibliography ==
- Corbo, Gabriella (1985). "Osservazioni sul titolo originale del poema di Federico Frezzi". Rassegna della Letteratura Italiana. 89: 444–451.
- Filippini, Enrico (1922). Studi frezziani. Foligno: F. Campitelli.
- Filippini, Enrico (1927). "Un antico ed ignoto codice del Quadriregio tornato recentemente in Italia". Bibliofilia. 29: 27–37.
- Negri, Renzo (1984). "Federico Frezzi". Enciclopedia Dantesca. Vol. 3. Rome: Istituto dell'Enciclopedia Italiana. p. 56.
- Pellizzari, Achille (1913). Riflessi danteschi nel Trecento. Naples. pp. 167–189.
- Petrocchi, Giorgio (1965). "Cultura e poesia del Trecento". Storia della letteratura italiana. Milan: Garzanti. pp. 600–602.
- Rotondi, Giovanni (1921). Federico Frezzi: La vita e le opere. Todi. pp. 139–145.
- Sapegno, Natalino (1973). Il Trecento. Milan: Vallardi. p. 130.
- Terpening, Ronnie H. (1985). Charon and the Crossing: Ancient, Medieval, and Renaisance Transformations of a Myth. London and Toronto: Associated University Presses. pp. 139–145.
