= Rasiglia =

Village in Umbria, Italy

Coordinates: 42.95944°N 12.86089°E

Rasiglia is a village in the municipality of Foligno, in the region of Umbria, Italy. As of 2021, it had a population of 28. The village is situated at an elevation of 636 metres (2,087 ft) above sea level.

Rasiglia is situated about 18 kilometres (11 mi) from Foligno. The village preserves the characteristics of a medieval settlement arranged in an amphitheatrical form and is especially known for its springs and watercourses running through the built-up area.

== History ==
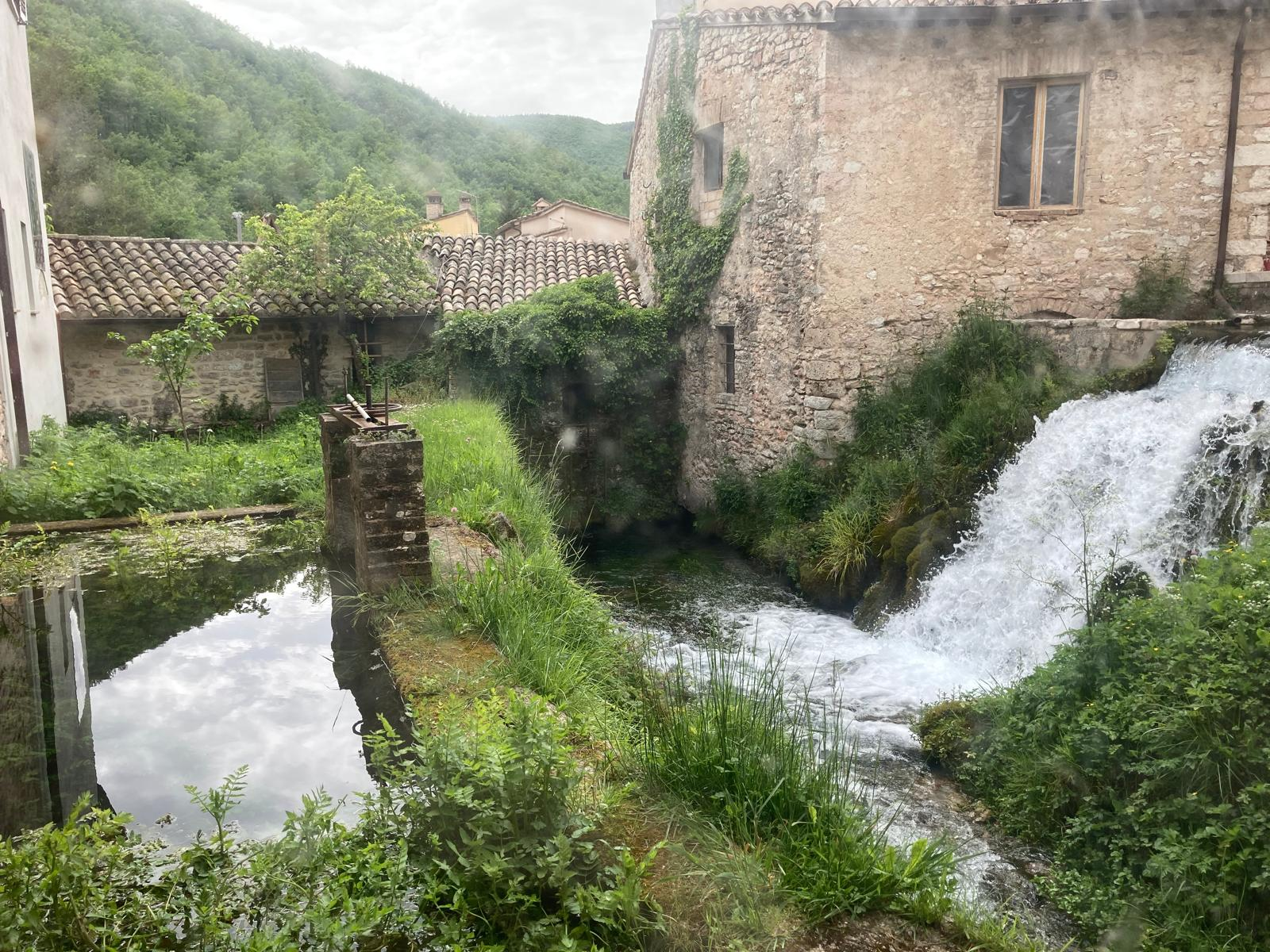
Water mill in Rasiglia

The origins of Rasiglia can be traced back to the 12th century. Its frontier position toward the territory of Sellano and toward the Diocese of Spoleto led the Trinci to build a defensive structure there, the Castrum et Roccha Rasilia. The Rocca originally occupied the whole summit of the hill in an almost rectangular layout; visible remains now include stretches of the enclosing walls and the ruin of a tower. A mill, a fulling mill, and several houses in the village belonged to the Trinci, who used the waters of the Menotre to power mills and workshops that sustained the local community for centuries.

== Geography ==
The spring that feeds and crosses Rasiglia is Capovena, located in the upper part of the village at the foot of the palace occupied by the Trinci, lords of Foligno between 1305 and 1439. Its waters form rivulets and small cascades that join in a large basin called the Peschiera before flowing into the Menotre river. Other springs in the area are Alzabove, which rises below Monte Carosale and supplies the aqueduct of the southern Valle Umbra; Venarella, supplying the aqueduct for Verchiano; Le Vene, in the locality of Chieve; La Vena Pidocchiosa, in the locality of Pallailla; and Le Vene di Campolungo, in the Volperino ditch.

== Surrounding landmarks ==
In the surrounding area are the Sanctuary of Santa Maria delle Grazie and the Parco dell'Altolina, which includes the Cascate del Menotre and the Grotte dell'Abbadessa, of karst origin.
