= San Girolamo, Spello =

Church in Umbria, Italy

Coordinates: 43°00′03″N 12°40′40″E

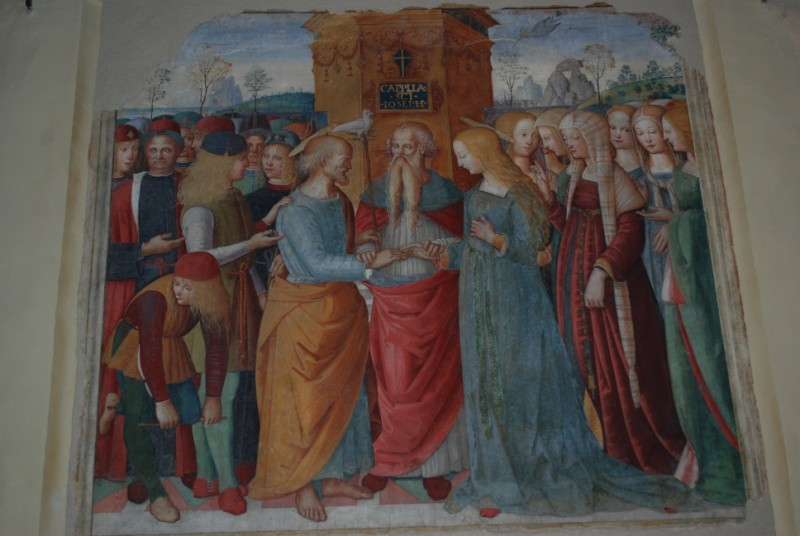

San Girolamo is a 15th-century Roman Catholic church located in Spello, province of Perugia, region of Umbria, Italy.

== History ==
The church and adjacent Franciscan monastery were built in 1472-1482 under the patronage of Braccio II Baglioni, then lord of Spello. It remained under the Order of Friars Minor until suppression during the Napoleonic era. The monks returned in 1815, but by 1826 most had been moved to the former convent of Santa Caterina di Rapecchiano. A second suppression occurred in 1866, although monks remained until the 20th century. In 1885, a plot of the adjacent orchard became the communal cemetery. In 1965 the municipal government assigned the convent to a community of Piccoli Fratelli di p. C. de Foucault, who have since remained.

The church can be accessed from both an external portico and the monastic cloister. The church has a cross-shaped layout with a single nave flanked by lateral altars, ending in rounded apse.

== Interior artworks ==
Like many Franciscan churches, the exterior is austere; but the interior has numerous painted decorations. Many of the authors of the paintings remain anonymous. On the counterfacade are paintings depicting St Trophimus of Arles and St Felix and Angel (18th-century). On the right wall are canvases depicting:

- Saints Carlo Borromeo and Diego (1765)
- Three Franciscan saints: St Paschal Baylon; St Peter of Alcantara; and Duns Scotus (18th-century)

On the left wall of the nave are paintings depicting:

- Saint Margaret of Cortona (fresco 17th-century).
- A Virgin of the Immaculate Conception with Saints Antony of Padua, Margaret of Cortona, and Bonaventure (1761) by Domenico Valeri
- St John of Capistrano (18th-century)
- Trinity, Franciscan Order, Education of the Virgin and Sts Liborio and Rose (1677) attributed to Carlo Lamparelli

The apse has an intarsio wood choir (1537). Behind the altar is a 15th-century fresco depicting the Marriage of the Virgin attributed to Rocco Zoppo. The main altar sculpture in stucco depicts Saints John, Matthew, Mark, and Luke by a follower of Agostino Silva. Other paintings depict

- Ecce homo (18th-century).
- Resurrected Christ (fresco 18th-century).
- St Jerome in the Desert (fresco 17th-century).
- Sacrifice of Isaac (fresco 17th-century) in the style of Giacomo Giorgetti
- Mortification of Christ (early 18th-century).
- Painted wooden crucifix (15th-century)

The portico has a series of worn frescoes including:

- St Job (1502) attributed to a follower of Mezzastris
- Blessed James of the Marches (1497) attributed to Pierantonio Mezzastris
- St Clare (16th-century) attributed to Lorenzo Doni
- St Francis renounces his paternal property (16th-century) attributed to Lorenzo Doni
- St Francis receives stigmata (15th-century) attributed to Pierantonio Mezzastris

The chapel of the Annuciation is also covered in frescoes by Valerio de' Muti and possibly Rocco Zoppo.
