= Giostra della Quintana =

Coordinates: 42.95188°N 12.70538°E

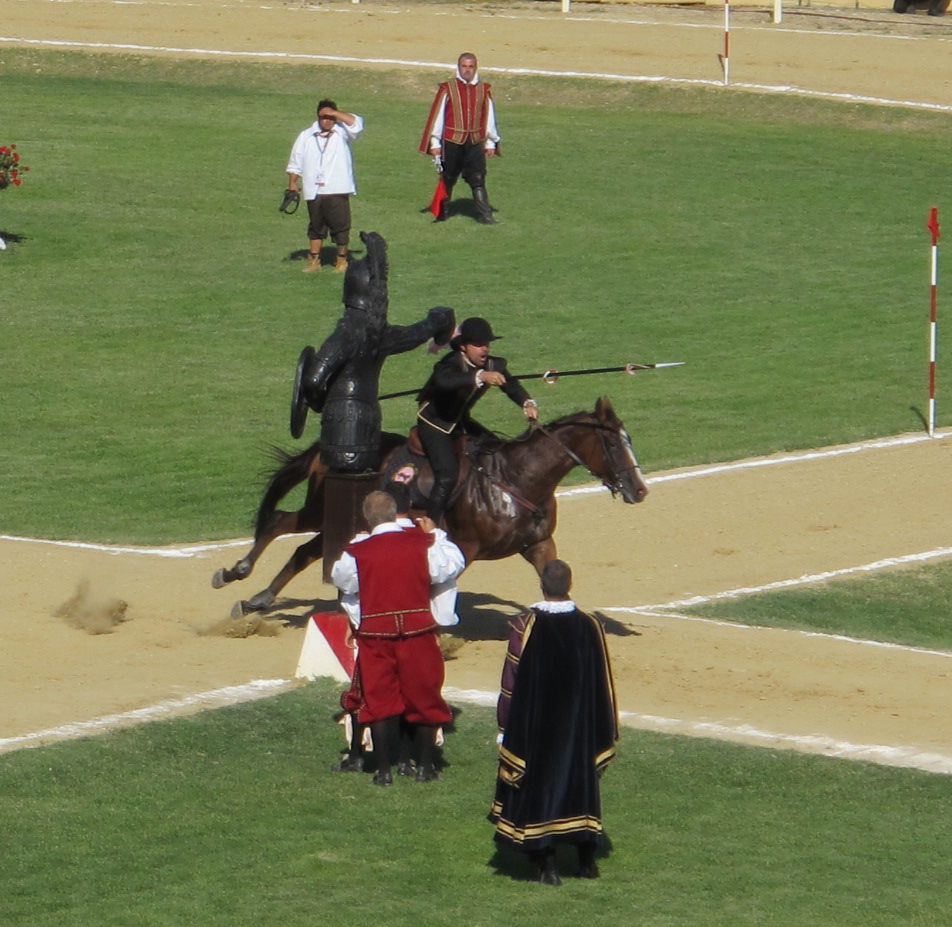
A knight collecting the ring

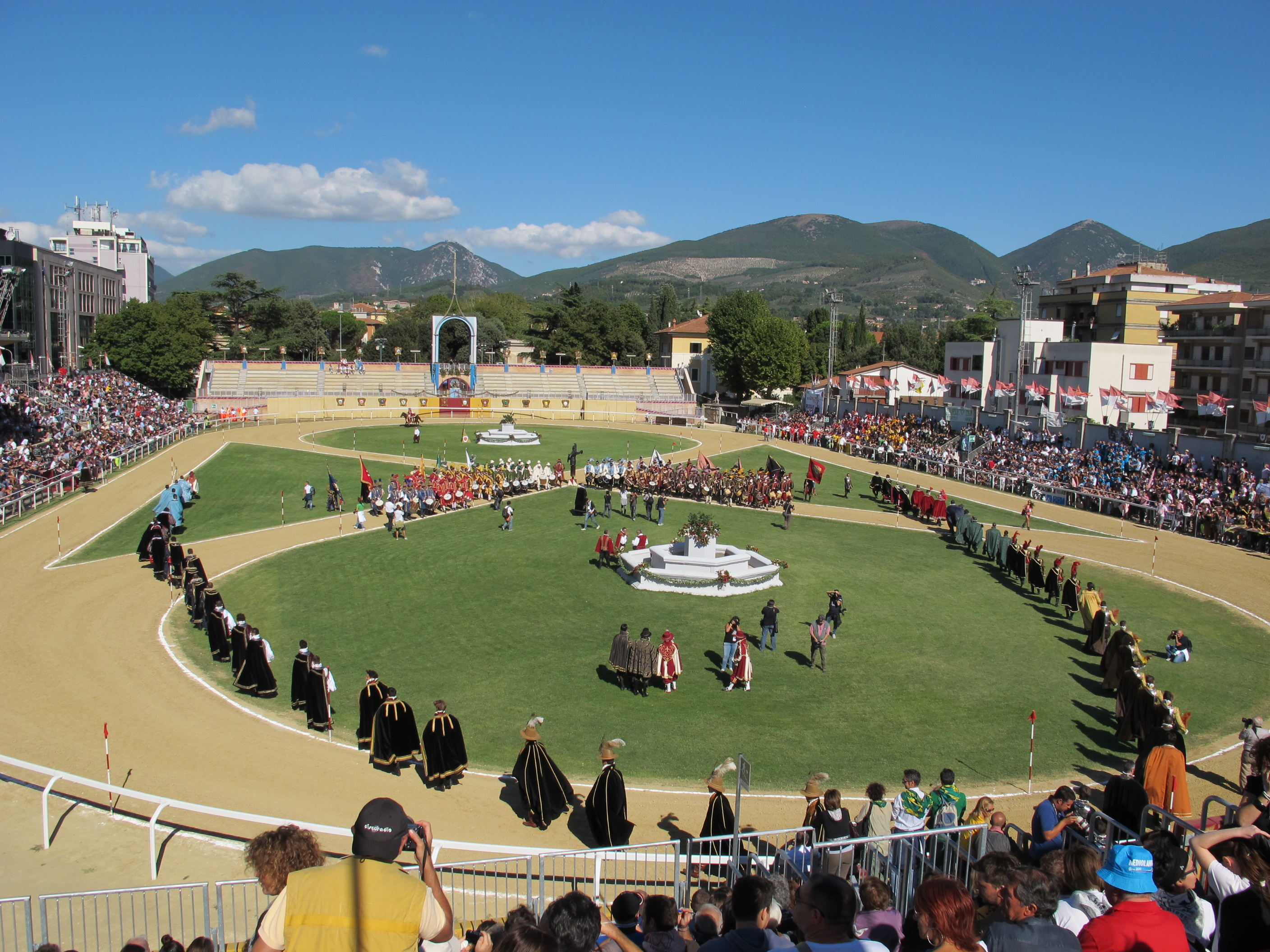
Opening ceremony in the tournament stadium with its figure-of-eight shaped track

The Giostra della Quintana was a historical jousting tournament in Foligno, central Italy. It was revived as a modern festival in 1946.

The tournament event takes place in June (1st Challenge) during a Saturday night and September (the counter-challenge) the 2nd or 3rd Sunday of September, and is proceeded each time by a festival with a 17th-century costumed parade.

== Historical ==
The definition of Quintana comes from the 5th road of the Roman military camps, where the soldiers were trained in lance fighting. They would run against a dummy-soldier, trying to catch a ring hanging from an arm of the dummy. This is the origin of the tournament's name, but the first definition and documented "Quintana" as a knights' jousting tournament during a festival, dates back to 1448. In 1613 the build-up to the Quintana tournament included the carnival festivals we see today.

== Modern ==
In 1946 the actual "Giostra della Quintana" was reborn. There are ten knights, each representing a quarter of the Town, and each with a distinctive flag. The knights gallop on horseback at high speed around a figure-of-eight shaped track, and must spear three rings. At each round of the competition the rings get smaller, requiring more precision with the lance.

The rings hang from a rotating statue in the centre of the stadium. The oak statue dates back to 1613, and represents Mars "God of War" from ancient Greek mythology. It holds a shield with the symbol of Foligno, and the ring is attached on an outstretched arm ready to be speared.

Over the Quintana weekend a number of festivities take place involving the whole town, including a parade with 800 characters dressed in 17th century costume on the day before the Ring Joust.
