= Niccolò Alunno =

Italian painter

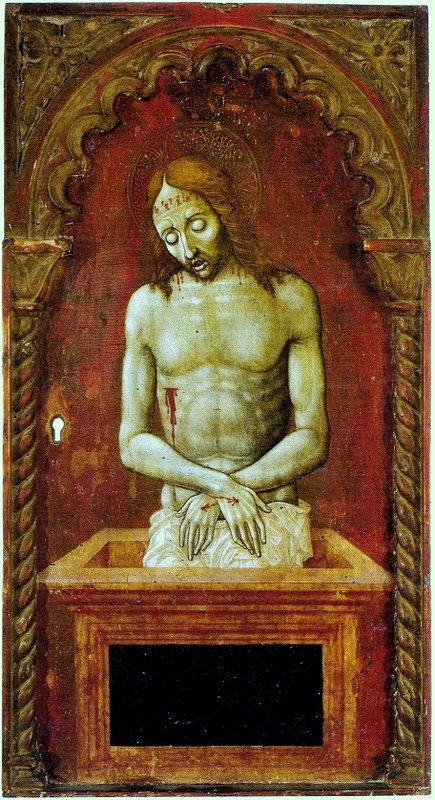
Ecce Homo (1480–1500). Panel by Niccolò di Liberatore (São Paulo Museum of Art, São Paulo).

Niccolò di Liberatore, known as L'Alunno (also Niccolò di Liberatore and Niccolò da Foligno; the name is sometimes spelled Nicolò) (1430–1502) was an Italian painter of the Umbrian school.

== Life and career ==
He was born at Foligno, the son of an apothecary. He was a pupil of Bartolomeo di Tomaso; his master's assistant was Benozzo Gozzoli, the pupil of Fra Angelico. The simple Umbrian feeling in his work was somehow modified by this Florentine influence. His earliest known example (dated 1458) is in the Franciscan Church of Deruta, near Perugia. He painted banners for religious processions, as well as altarpieces and other pictures, died a rich man, and is supposed by Mariotti to have been the master of Perugino, Pinturicchio, and Andrea di Luigi.

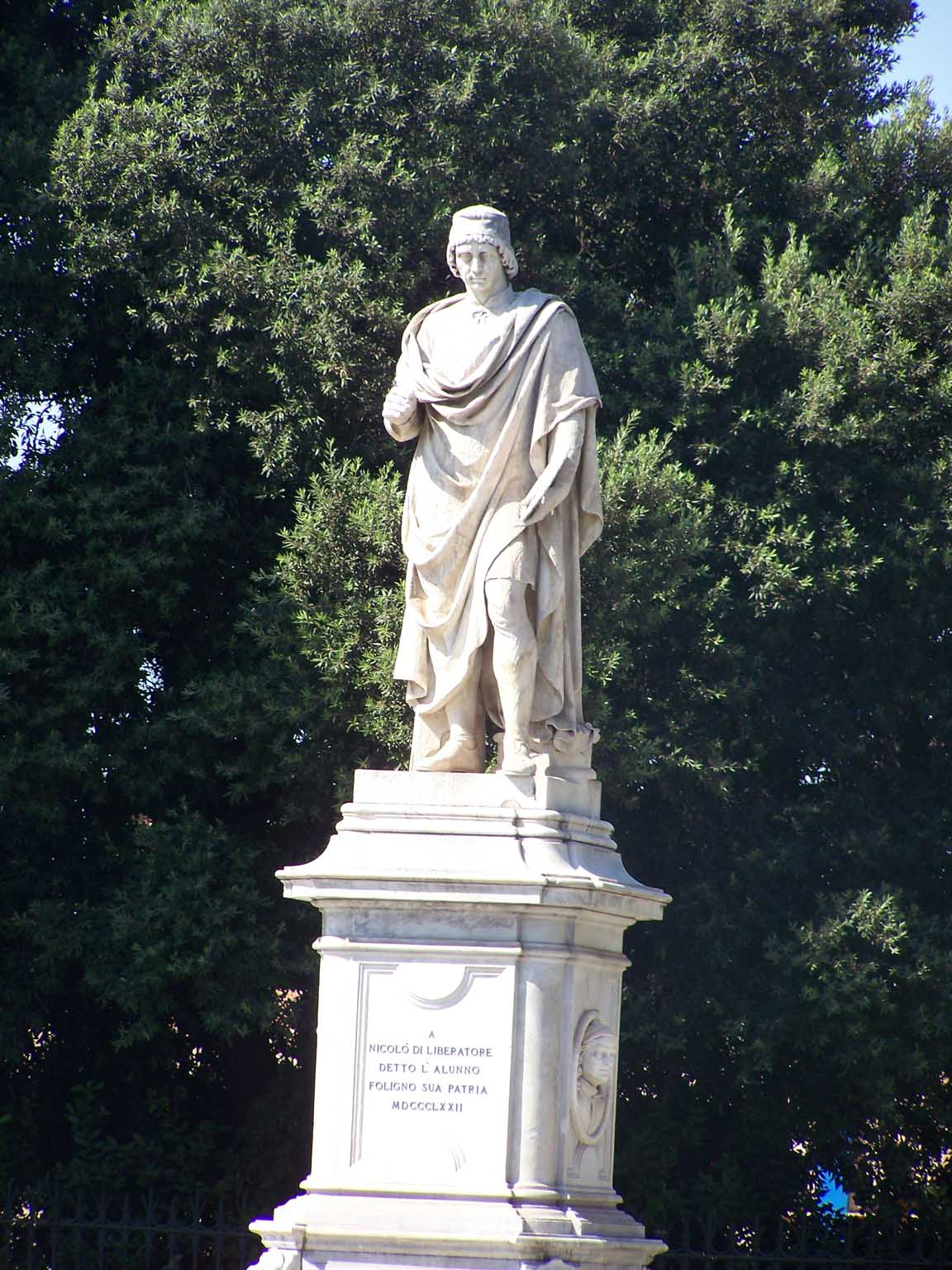
Statue in Foligno

Vasari mistakenly attributed some of his works to Alunno di Foligno or l'Alunno, misreading an inscription on the base of his large polyptych in the church of San Nicolò, where the painter signed himself “Alumnus Fulginiae” or “Nicholaus Alumnus Fulginiae”, which translates correctly as “Nicolò citizen of Foligno”.
