= Foligno =

Foligno Fuligno
- Comune
- Città di Foligno
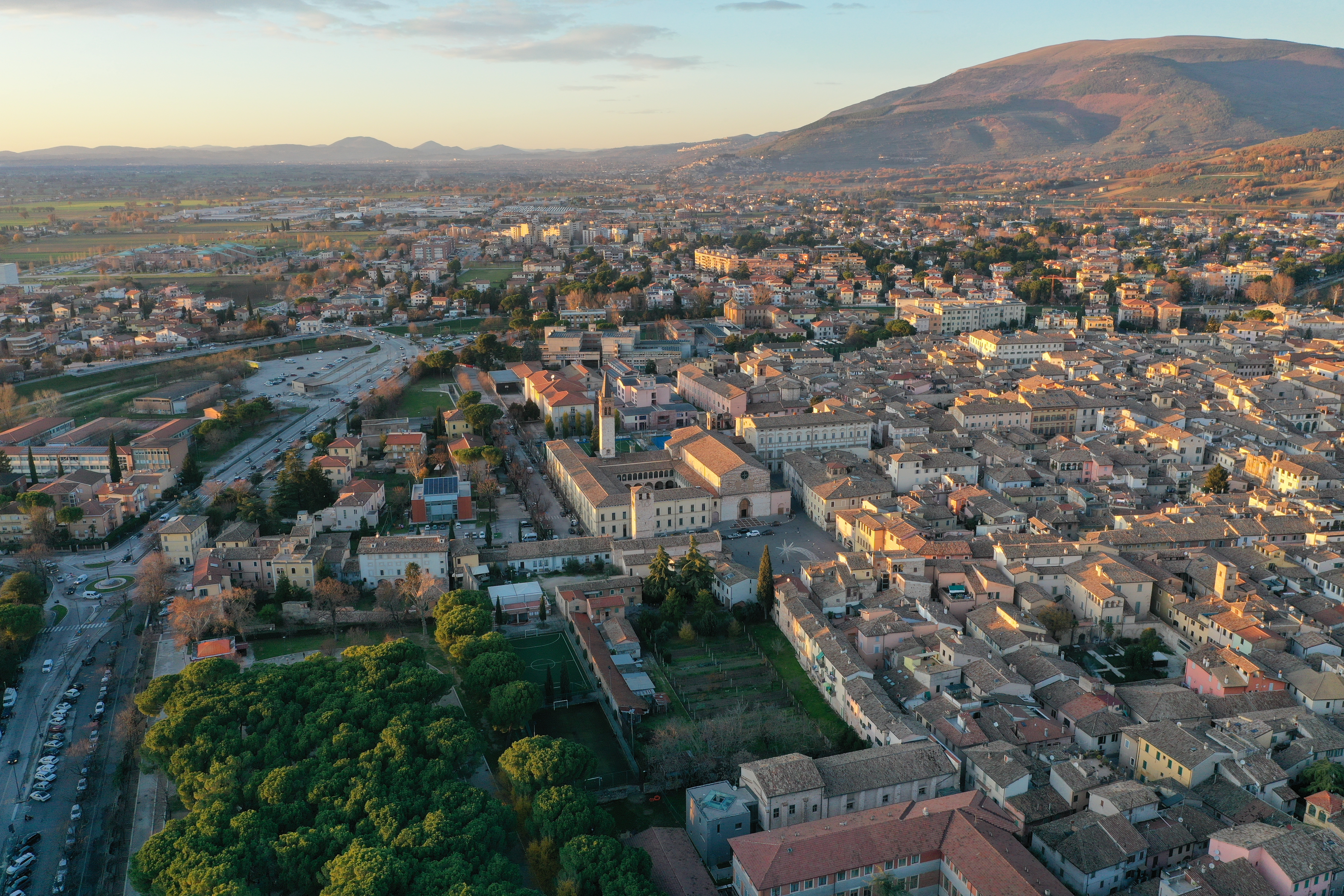
- Foligno aerial view

- Flag Coat of arms

- Location within Italy Location within Umbria
- Coordinates: 42.955761°N 12.703281°E
- Country: Italy
- Region: Umbria
- Province: Perugia (PG)
- Frazioni: See list

Government
  - Mayor: Stefano Zuccarini

Area
  - Total: 263 km^{2} (102 sq mi)
- Elevation: 234 m (768 ft)

Population (1 January 2025)
  - Total: 55,303
  - Density: 210/km^{2} (545/sq mi)
- Demonym: Folignati or Fulginati
- Time zone: UTC+1 (CET)
  - Summer (DST): UTC+2 (CEST)
- Postal code: 06034, 06030, 06037
- Dialing code: 0742
- Patron saint: St. Felician Martyr
- Saint day: 24 January
- Website: Official website

Foligno (Italian pronunciation: [foˈliɲɲo]; Southern Umbrian: Fuligno) is an ancient town of Italy in the province of Perugia in east central Umbria, on the Topino river where it leaves the Apennines and enters the wide plain of the Clitunno river system. It is located 40 kilometres (25 miles) south-east of Perugia, 10 km (6 mi) north-north-west of Trevi and 6 km (4 mi) south of Spello.

While Foligno is an active bishopric, one of its civil parishes, San Giovanni Profiamma, is the historical site of the former bishopric of Foro Flaminio, which remains a Latin Catholic titular see.

Foligno railway station forms part of the main line from Rome to Ancona, and is the junction for Perugia; it is thus an important rail centre, with repair and maintenance yards for the trains of central Italy, and was therefore subjected to severe Allied aerial bombing in World War II, responsible for its relatively modern aspect, although it retains some medieval monuments.

Of its Roman past no significant trace remains, with the exception of the regular street plan of the centre. Other resources include sugar refineries and metallurgical, textile, building materials and paper and timber industries.

After the war, the city's position in the plain and again its rail connections have led to a considerable suburban spread with the attendant problems of traffic and air pollution, as well as a severe encroachment on the Umbrian wetlands. Foligno is on an important interchange road junction in central Italy and 2 km (1 mi) away from the centre of the city there is the Foligno Airport.

== Etymology ==
The name Foligno is traced to an Umbrian form, Fulginia, which became the Roman Fulginium and is linked to the cult of the goddess Fulginia.

In the 19th century, the scholar Adone Palmieri held that the city derived its origin from a founder identified as a Fulgineo, a captain of the ancient Umbrians, who was said to have established it in the time of Tyrrhenus in the year 2482 Anno Mundi.

== History ==
=== Antiquity ===
The origins of Foligno are uncertain. The earliest mention appears in two fragments of Cicero's oration in favor of Lucius Varenus, in which the municipium and prefecture of Fulginia are recalled. Appian mentions Fulginiae in connection with the Perusine War, and Pliny includes it among the cities of Umbria; it is also listed in the Itinerarium Hierosolymitanum. The poet Statius praises its fields. Some historians attributed its foundation to the Celto-Ligurians, while others assigned it to the Umbrians, with the name derived from Fulginio or Fulcinio, regarded as its founder.

The city developed at a strategic site, at the fork of the Via Flaminia and at the point where the Topino River reaches the valley floor. Its urban layout is characterized by straight, grid-like streets with right-angle intersections, a pattern connected to four surviving Roman bridges on the old bed of the Topino.

In AUC 488 (266 BCE) the city was taken by the Romans together with Umbria and Etruria. It was raised first to the rank of prefecture and then to that of municipium, becoming one of the 15 Umbrian cities confederated with Rome.

When Foligno, together with other Umbrian cities, waged war against Rome, it was sacked and destroyed by the victorious Roman forces under the consul Fabius Maximus. Further destruction followed in AUC 458 (296 BCE) when the inhabitants allied themselves with the Senonian Gauls and the Samnites against Rome.

In AUC 536 (218 BCE) Hannibal, after defeating the Roman army and killing the consul Gaius Flaminius, marched on Foligno on his way to Rome and dismantled and devastated it and its territory after it had resisted. The city was later restored by Scipio Africanus.

Gaius Flaminius (consul 187 BC) restored the walls of Foligno and paved the road named after him, the Via Flaminia, which had originally been begun from Rome by his father.

In AUC 663 (91 BCE) Foligno joined the Marsi and other Umbrian cities in the Social War against Rome and suffered heavy damage from Lucius Porcius Cato. In AUC 668 (86 BCE) the inhabitants were enrolled in Roman citizenship and assigned to the Cornelia tribe.

During Sulla's civil war it supported the party of Marius against the Sullan faction, sided with Pompey in AUC 704 (50 BCE), and subsequently followed Mark Antony.

No further historical record appears until the barbarian period, when the city suffered serious damage at the hands of Alaric, king of the Visigoths, in 412, of Genseric, king of the Vandals, in 452, of Attila in the following year, and of Odoacer in 476.

=== Early Middle Ages ===
Totila seized the city in 546, but it was recovered for the Empire by Belisarius four years later.

When Alboin, king of the Lombards, occupied Umbria in 571 and founded the Duchy of Spoleto, Foligno was included within it and governed by a judge and lieutenant. Liutprand later sacked both Foligno and Forum Flaminii during his war against the duke of Spoleto, Thrasimund. The inhabitants of Forum Flaminii, left without shelter, took refuge in Foligno, considerably increasing its population. The rebuilding of Foligno took place around the middle of the 8th century.

The city suffered further from Saracen incursions in 840 and Hungarian invasions in 915 and 924.

=== High Middle Ages ===
Around 1160, during the reign of Frederick I, the city was expanded with the addition of a suburban district known as Nova Civitas Fulginei or Nova Civitas Abbatiae, named after a Benedictine church.

Under Pope Innocent III, Foligno, together with much of Umbria, passed under the authority of the Church, and from that time the Duchy of Spoleto was governed by a rector who sent a lieutenant to administer Foligno.

In 1211 a municipal privilege was issued for the Benedictine Abbey of Sassovivo. By that time the city is associated with civic institutions including a consilium populi, a chamberlain, and a Captain of the People.

In 1227 the city was occupied by Conrad Guiscard, captain of Frederick II, who became its lord and expelled the Guelph faction. The following year Cardinal Giovanni Colonna, legate of Gregory IX, at the head of papal forces and assisted by the exiled Guelphs led by Trincia di Berardo Trinci, expelled Conrad and restored the city to the Church. In 1235 Frederick II again occupied Foligno, leaving Conrad as his vicar and prefect.

A renewed Guelph attack expelled the imperial vicar once more and returned the city to Pope Gregory IX, but in 1240 Frederick II entered Foligno with great honors, appointed Count Thomas of Aquino, count of Acerra, as his vicar and captain general, and expelled Trincia di Berardo. In June 1254 the city was retaken from the Imperial party by Bonifacio Fogliani, papal rector of the Duchy of Spoleto, aided by the Perugians, Trincia Trinci, and other Guelphs; Trincia was then appointed vicar.

A strong Ghibelline reaction followed. Anastasio di Filippo Anastasi of Foligno, placing himself at the head of the Ghibellines with imperial support, retook the city in 1264 and governed it with the title of gonfaloniere of justice until his death in 1288. Between 1280 and 1281, under his rule, the city was embellished, expanded, and fortified with walls enclosing the external districts and quarters known as Ponte di Cesare, Pugilli, Castelvecchio, Todi, and Abbadia. He was succeeded by his son Corrado, who governed until 1303 together with his brothers Gerardo, Ermanno, and Filippo.

The Trinci family, supported by the Guelph faction, continually opposed them, and Nallo Trinci eventually freed the city from the Anastasi, becoming gonfaloniere and captain of the people with full authority over the city and its territory in 1305.

Between 1280 and 1291 new stone walls were constructed.

=== Late Middle Ages ===
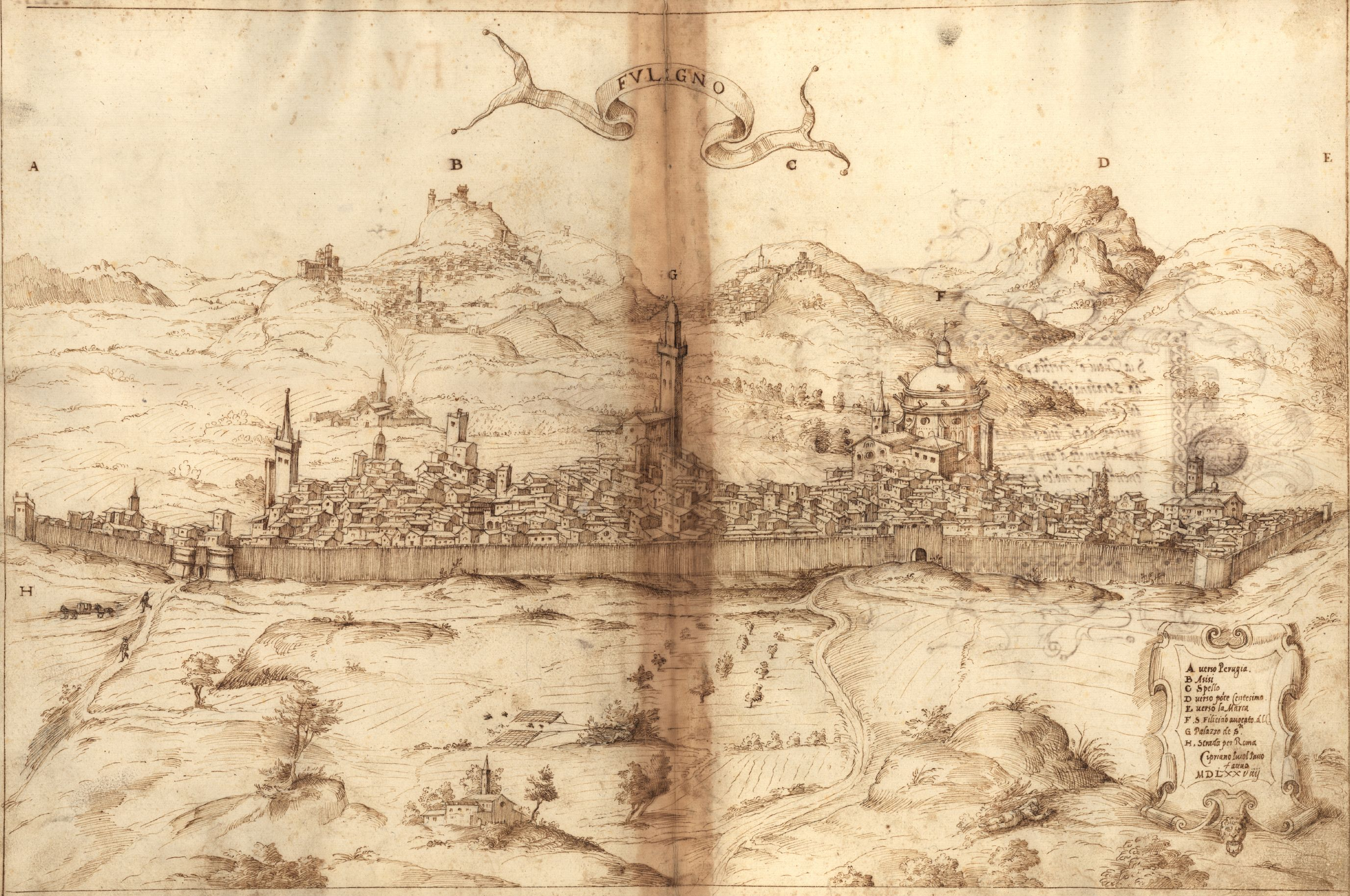
View of Foligno by Cipriano Piccolpasso in 1579, executed in pen and ink

Nallo was succeeded by his son Ugolino II and then by Trincia II, who was confirmed as vicar of the Holy See by Cardinal Albornoz. Under the auspices of this cardinal a fortress was built, and the district in which it stood was called Cassaro. On 30 November 1367 Pope Urban V appointed Trincia II as vicar of Foligno and its territory for an annual tribute of a sparrowhawk. Gregory XI confirmed him in this office and also made him general of the Church and lord of Bevagna, Limigiano, and Giano. From this period dates the growing power of the Trinci family.

In 1377 Corrado II Trinci succeeded, and nine years later Ugolino III, eldest son of Trincia, assumed leadership. In 1392 he was appointed vicar of Foligno, Bevagna, Nocera, Trevi, Giano, Montecchio, and other places, on condition of paying an annual tribute of 1,000 gold florins to the Apostolic Camera.

Pope Boniface IX visited Foligno in 1393 to settle disputes between factions and was received with great honors; Ugolino, having promised assistance against Perugia, received from him the Golden Rose. Antipope John XXIII confirmed his vicariate and added Bettona, Montefalco, and the castles of Collemancio, Gualdo Cattaneo, and other fortresses; he also acquired Leonessa in Abruzzo from Ladislaus of Naples.

In 1435 Ugolino was succeeded by Niccolò Trinci, who expanded the family’s domains by acquiring Nocera and the castles of Melace and Polino. His rule, marked by cruelty and tyranny, led to his assassination together with his brother Bartolomeo by the inhabitants in the fortress of Nocera. Corrado III then came to power and acquired Piediluco with its lake. Having failed to support the Guelph cause and instead favoring the enemies of the Church, he provoked Pope Eugene IV to send an army of 7,000 cavalry and 5,000 infantry under Cardinal Giovanni Vitelleschi, Rinaldo Orsini, Paolo della Molara, Niccolò Vitelli, and Count Everso dell'Anguillara. The papal forces occupied Bevagna, Nocera, and Trevi and besieged Foligno, which resisted for a long time.

The inhabitants, weary of the harsh rule of the Trinci, opened the gates to the papal legate and returned to papal authority, formalizing the submission in a capitulation preserved in the municipal archive. Vitelleschi had Corrado III Trinci and his sons executed, and all territories they had acquired returned to the Church.

Vitelleschi was appointed rector of Foligno and the Duchy of Spoleto, succeeded in 1440 by Mattia Fusci, bishop of Rieti, and in the following year by Lorenzo degli Atti of Todi. Later rectors included Troilo Verdilotti of Ascoli, Cesare Conti of Lucca, Pier Luigi Borgia, Giacomo Tolomei, and Nanno Piccolomini of Siena.

In 1488 Maximilian I came to Foligno at the request of Pope Innocent VIII to settle renewed factional disputes. In 1490 the same pope appointed his brother Maurizio Cibo as governor of Spoleto, Assisi, and Foligno, and Alexander VI confirmed to the city the fief of Gualdo Cattaneo. Subsequent popes continued to grant privileges and appoint governors directly.

=== 18th and 19th century ===
In 1782 Pope Pius VI passed through Foligno on his journey to Vienna to meet Emperor Joseph II.

Foligno experienced periods of French rule in 1798–1799 and again in 1809–1814.

On 6 July 1816, under Pope Pius VII, Foligno was listed as a seat of district government, placed under the Perugia Delegation. In 1817 the community of Spello was attached. This administrative arrangement continued until Italian unification. In 1857 Foligno was listed as a municipality in the Papal States' territorial division.

The city was heavily affected by an earthquake in 1832.

In the mid-19th century, Foligno had a population of 16,317 inhabitants, of whom 13,117 lived in the town and 3,200 in the countryside. In 1860 it joined the newly unified Italian state, and became a seat of district administration.

=== Modern history ===
During World War II Foligno had an important airfield, barracks, military schools and weapons industries, especially connected with aviation. The city was subjected to numerous Anglo-American bombing raids, with about 80% of it destroyed. It was awarded a Silver Medal for Civil Valor in recognition of the resilience of its civilian population.

The earthquake of 1997 caused very serious damage to the city and to mountain hamlets, some of which were almost totally destroyed.

== Geography ==
Foligno is situated in the Umbrian Valley on the left bank of the Topino, a tributary of the Tiber, at an elevation of 235 metres (771 ft) above sea level. It lies in a plain, though surrounded to the east and north by hills, with views of the Apennines and Monte Subasio at short distance. The river Menotre runs along the southern side of the walls and irrigates much of the surrounding territory.

Foligno lies 100 miles (160 km) from Rome. The city stands along the Via Flaminia, where four major roads converge, corresponding to its four gates: the Via Toscana, the Marchigiana, the Romana, and the Todina.

=== Quarters ===
The historical centre of Foligno is traditionally divided into twenty rioni ("quarters"). Only ten of those are officially recognized and can take part in the Giostra della Quintana: Ammanniti, Badia, Cassero, Contrastanga, Croce Bianca, Giotti, La Mora, Morlupo, Pugilli, Spada.

Ten other rioni have been absorbed by the ones above: Borgo, Fonte del Campo, Cipischi, Croce, Falconi, Feldenghi, Franceschi, Menacoda, Piazza Vecchia and Spavagli.

=== Subdivisions ===
The municipality includes the localities of Acqua Alleori, Annifo, Arvello, Belfiore, Budino, Cancellara, Capodacqua, Carpello, Casale di Scopoli, Case Bruciate, Casenove, Casette di Cupigliolo, Cassignano, Colfiorito, Colle di Capodacqua, Colle di Scandolaro, Colle San Lorenzo, Convento Cerritello, Convento Istituto Missionario Sacro Cuore, Cupacci, Curasci, Fiamenga, Foligno, Forcatura, Fraia, La Valle, Leggiana, Lie', Maceratola, Pale, Pallailla-I Santi, Pisenti, Poggiarello, Ponte Santa Lucia, Pontecentesimo, Popola, Rasiglia, Ravignano, Roviglieto, San Giovanni Profiamma, San Vittore, Santo Stefano dei Piccioni, Scandolaro, Scopoli, Seggio, Serra Bassa, Sostino, Tenne, Treggio, Uppello, Verchiano, Via Clareno, Vionica, Volperino.

In 2021, 3,339 people lived in rural dispersed dwellings not assigned to any named locality. At the time, the most populous locality was Foligno proper (44,734). The following localities had no recorded permanent residents: Casone, Sassovivo Abbey, Convento Cappuccini, Convento di San Bartolomeo, Convento Madonna delle Grazie, Località Moano.

==== Forum Flaminii ====
Near Foligno, in AUC 566 (188 BCE), another city arose, named Forum Flaminii after its founder Gaius Flaminius. Its site corresponded to the present church of San Giovanni Profiamma, about 3 kilometres (1.9 mi) away on the right bank of the Topino. This city is mentioned by Strabo, Pliny, and in the Peutinger Table. Epigraphic and historical evidence indicates that Forum Flaminii was a republic and municipium associated with and dependent on Foligno.

==== Other localities ====
Capodacqua lies near the height called Colfornaro and is the birthplace of Saint Domenico di Sora.

Sant'Eraclio, formerly called Statio Fulginas, was a station for passing troops and preserves a castle with tower.

== Economy ==
In the mid-19th century, Foligno already functioned as a major commercial and industrial center, with around 250 establishments both within and outside the city, some powered by water, others by steam.

Industries included leather processing, paper mills of long standing, a copper foundry, dye works, fulling mills, brickworks, bronze foundries and brass works, candle factories, confectionery production, pasta factories for export, soap production, and a steam-powered silk mill producing between 4,000 and 6,000 pounds of silk.

Sericulture was further supported by numerous silkworm facilities and a regulated cocoon market. Additional enterprises included bath establishments, nail and metal goods factories, tin and sheet-metal works, hat-making, umbrella production, chair-making, mechanical workshops for industrial and agricultural machinery, ironworks, cart manufacturing, rope-making, comb and sieve production, saddlery, brush-making, copper utensil production, and other crafts.

There were two printing houses, including Tomassini, known for publishing the Gazzetta Universale. The city also included playing card production, iron and timber depots, goldsmiths, glassworks, and a wide range of artisans such as engravers, photographers, painters, stoneworkers, gunsmiths, gilders, and bookbinders.

The land produced abundant agricultural goods, including hemp, hard wheat, other cereals, vines, and potatoes, with olive cultivation increasingly widespread. Mulberry plantations were extensive. The area contained quarries of limestone, pozzolana, and marble suitable for slabs and ornament, including the varieties known as Palombino di Foligno and Lumachella di Foligno.

In the 1940s Foligno was a diversified industrial center. It contained aircraft manufacturing facilities belonging to the Aeronautica Umbra, with an estimated capacity of 35 aircraft monthly, although actual output was thought to have been much lower. Foligno was also one of the main centers for olive oil pressing and contained alcohol distilleries. The paper industry was located nearby at Pale and Belfiore.

== Religion ==
=== Cathedral ===
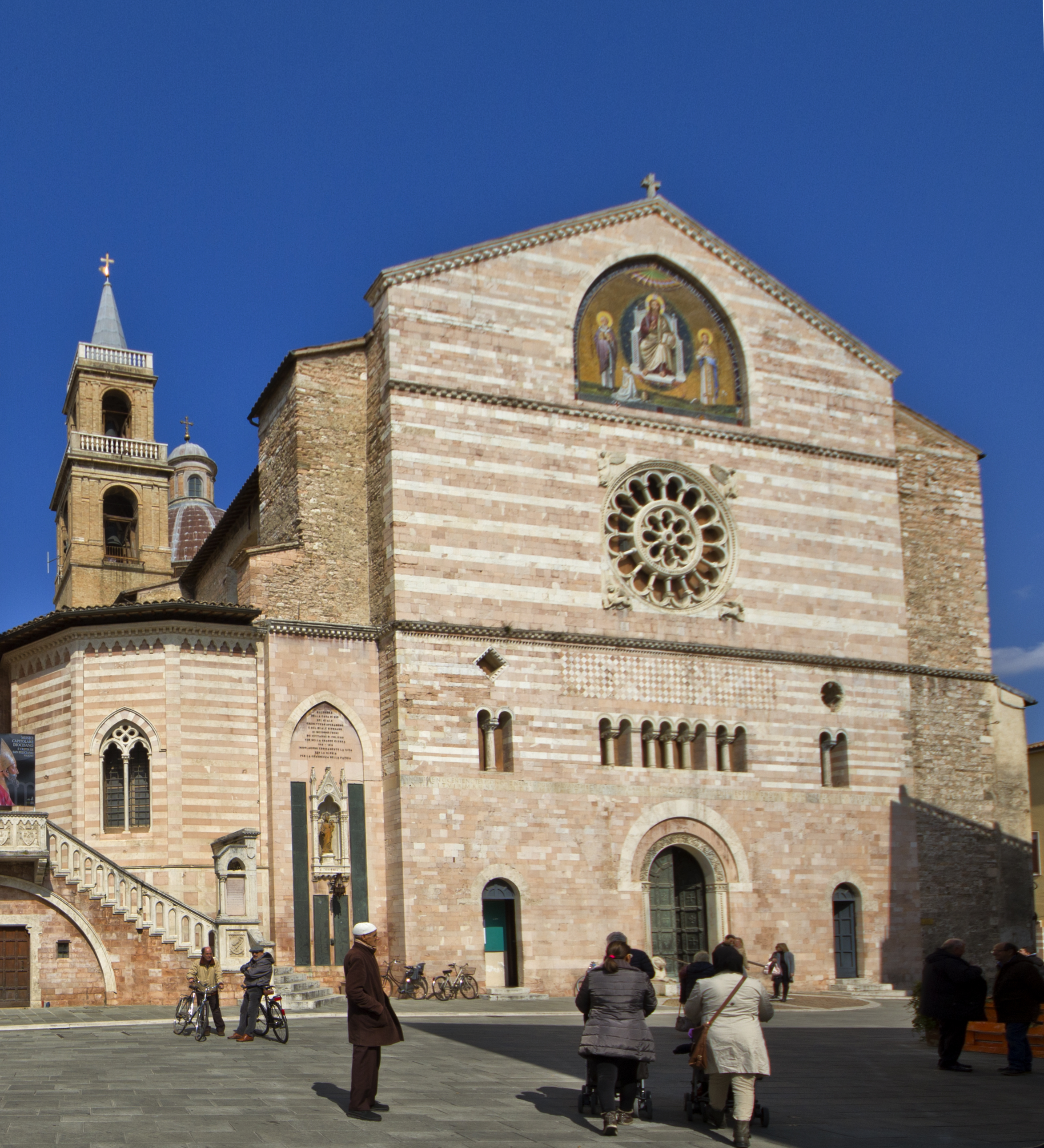
The Cathedral, its Romanesque front marked by horizontal banding and a rose window

The cathedral of San Feliciano rises on the site where Saint Felician, evangelizer of the city, was martyred and buried in AD 251.

The cathedral was erected on the ruins of a temple of Pallas. At the end of the 8th century it was destroyed by the Lombards and subsequently rebuilt and enlarged. The current cathedral was built in 1113 by Maestro Atto, as recorded by an inscription on the main façade. From 1201 it was enlarged with the secondary façade, and further restorations in the 16th and 17th centuries radically altered the structure. Little survives of the main façade with its white and pink bands; the mosaic depicting Christ enthroned between Saint Felician and Messalina, patrons of the city, together with Pope Leo XIII, dates to 1904.

The secondary façade preserves more of the medieval fabric. An inscription on the outer arch of the portal names Masters Rodolfo and Binello and the year 1201. The Romanesque portal is decorated with classicizing bas-reliefs including Frederick Barbarossa, Bishop Anselm, the symbols of the Evangelists, and the signs of the zodiac. Above the portal are a cornice on brackets with animal protomes and a loggia. The mullioned windows above were added by the Trinci family in the 15th century. The dome is a 16th-century addition by Giuliano di Baccio d'Agnolo.

The interior no longer preserves traces of the original construction; it reflects a Neoclassical rebuilding carried out in the second half of the 19th century by Giuseppe Piermarini on a project by Luigi Vanvitelli that was substantially modified. The baldachin above the high altar is a reproduction of St. Peter's Baldachin in Rome.

On the left wall of the winter choir are notable fragments of 16th-century tapestries. The Chapel of the Sacrament is decorated with frescoes depicting the stories of Saint Felician by Strada; the altarpiece representing the Miracle of Saint Martin is by Cristoforo Roncalli. Outside the chapel stands a 16th-century wooden statue of Saint Felician. The apse contains frescoes by Mancini. In the right transept is a painting of the Martyrdom of Saints Crispin and Crispinian of Florentine school. On the right altar is an oil painting of Saint Francis praying in a forest by Pizzoni of Foligno. The first altar on the right wall holds a Holy Family by Gian Andrea Lazzarini; the next altar has an oil painting of the Apotheosis and Martyrdom of Saint Mesellina attributed to Bartolomei of Foligno. In the sacristy are an Adoration of the Magi of 16th-century Florentine school and various other paintings by Pomarancio and Ferraù da Faenza.

The interior includes paintings by Gandolfi, Vicar, and Cavaliere Trabalza.

In the Palazzo delle Canoniche, adjoining the transept and the left nave, is the Diocesan Chapter Museum, which preserves around fifty works from the cathedral and from places in the diocese. The museum visit also includes the crypt of San Feliciano, dating from the 7th to the 9th century.

=== Santa Maria Infraportas ===
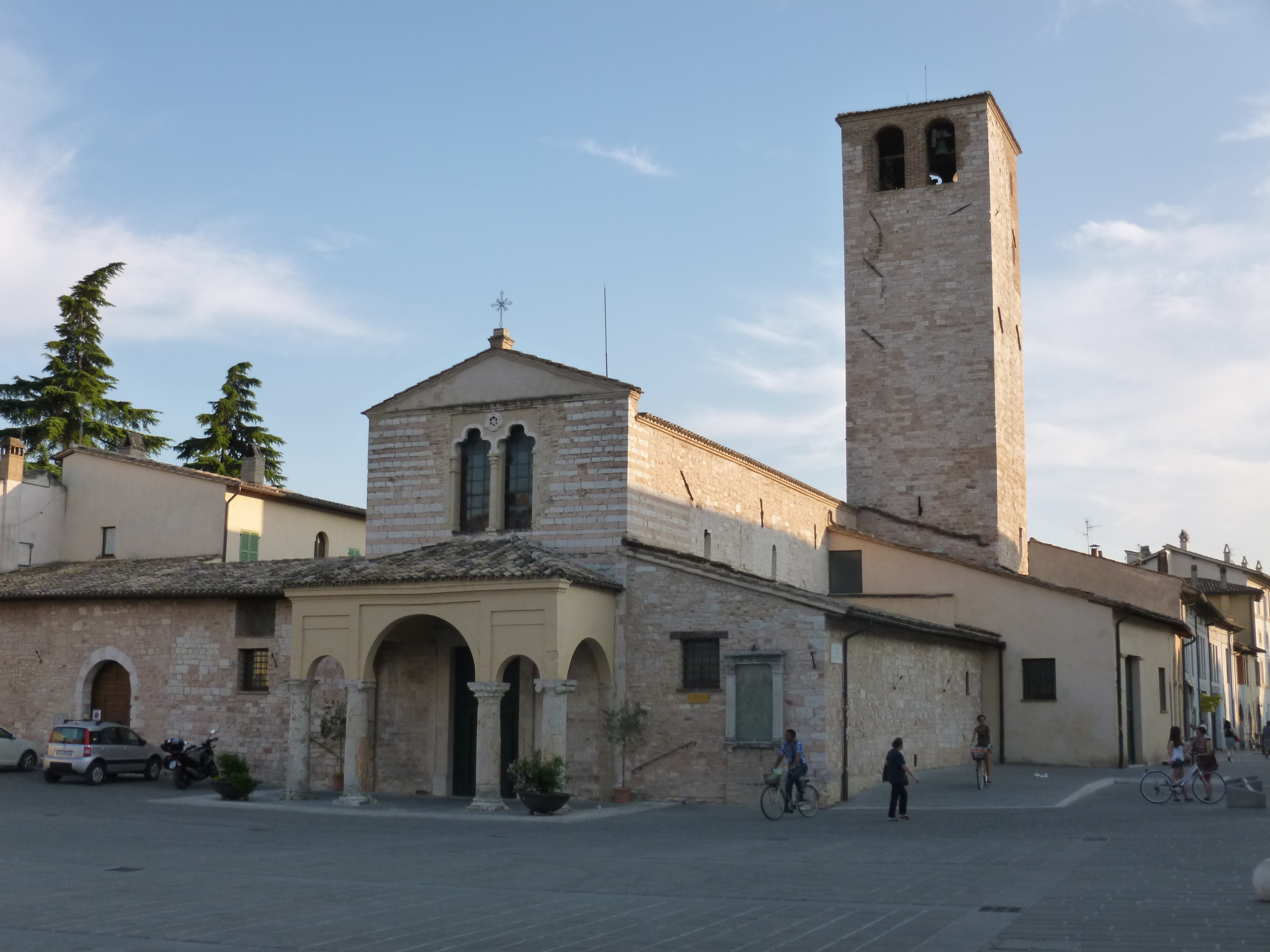
Church of Santa Maria Infraportas, with a projecting three-arched portico

The church of Santa Maria Infraportas is documented as a parish church from 1138, and it was built on the site of an 8th-century chapel dedicated to the Assumption, Saint Peter, and Saint Paul. When the Romanesque church was constructed in the 12th century, the earlier chapel was incorporated into the left nave.

The church is among the oldest in Foligno and is a Romanesque building with extensive votive decoration. Its white and pink stone façade, with a mullioned window with trilobed arches replacing the original rose window demolished in the 19th century, ends in a triangular pediment. The entrance is preceded by a portico with three arches supported by four columns with Romanesque capitals. To the right of the portico is a shrine of 1480 with a fresco, and at the far end of the right side stands the Romanesque bell tower. The floor levels of both the portico and the church are lower than the present street level.

The rectangular interior is divided into three naves by piers. The central nave, which is higher, has a barrel vault, while the side naves, added in the 15th century, are covered with ribbed vaults. The left nave contains a Madonna del Latte attributed to Giovanni di Corraduccio; a Madonna and Child with Saint John the Evangelist against a painted hanging supported by angels, signed by Ugolino di Gisberto and datable to the 16th century; a late 15th-century polychrome stucco Madonna and Child set in a shrine; and a tomb slab with the image of the deceased. On the third pier, beneath the arch to the right, are Saint Roch and angels.

In the central nave, near the door, is a Saint Jerome attributed to Pierantonio Mezzastris. On the first pier is a Madonna and Child among Angels attributed to Lattanzio di Niccolò. There are also 14th-century frescoes of Saints Peter and Paul, the Madonna and Child nursing, and the Annunciation. In the second pier on the left, inside a niche, is a 16th-century polychrome papier-mâché bust of Jesus with bound hands and the crown of thorns.

The right nave contains images of Crucifixions in niches, a Christ Carrying the Cross attributed to Niccolò Alunno, Saint Lucy and Saint Amicus by Pierantonio Mezzastris, and a Saint Peter Martyr attributable to Niccolò Alunno. Near the altar are frescoes of Saint Catherine of Alexandria and Saint Jerome by Pierantonio Mezzastris.

At the end of the left nave opens a chapel with two mullioned windows in the right wall. In the embrasure of one is a fresco of the Archangel Gabriel and Dismas, the Good Thief, from the second half of the 12th century. In the niche at the back is a blessing Christ between Saint Peter and Saint Paul with decoration recalling an eastern hanging, while the Romanesque wooden statue of the Madonna dates to the 12th century.

Until the 13th century the church stood outside the city walls and was called foris portam; after the construction of the new circuit of walls at the end of the 13th century, it came to stand between the two urban walls and took the name infra portas.

The tabernacle for holy oil is carved in stone with a gilded copper door, a work of the Renaissance.

=== San Francesco ===
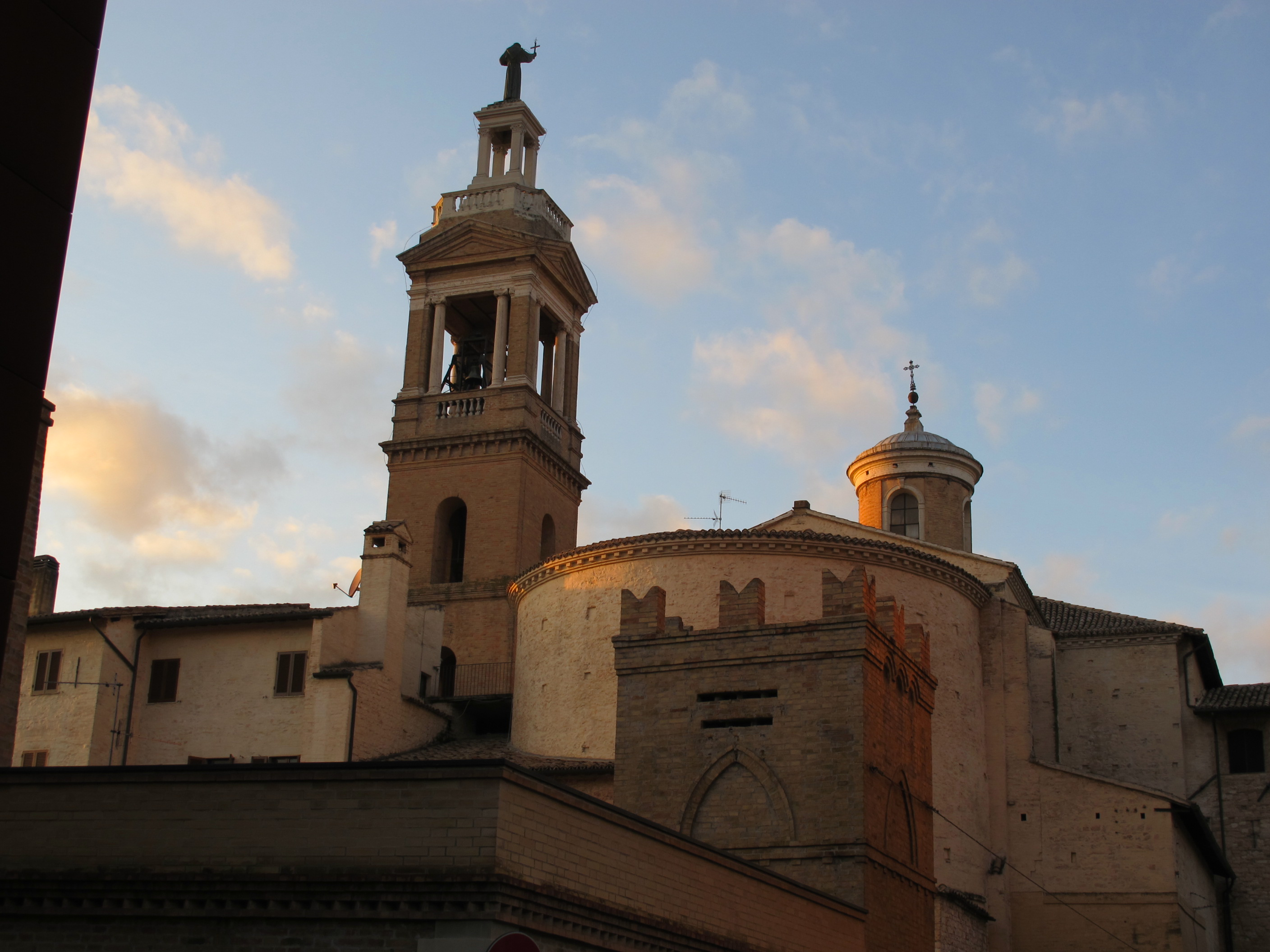
Church of San Francesco, with a multi-tiered bell tower capped by a small lantern

The church of San Francesco was built in the 13th century while incorporating the earlier church of San Matteo. It was entirely rebuilt in the 18th century to a design by the architect Andrea Vici dated 1796. The works lasted many years.

The church reopened to the public in 1856, though the façade was still incomplete; it was finished only in 1886. The stucco-decorated façade is divided by five lesenes with capitals supporting the entablature, above which rises a pediment crowning the central section. In the lower part three trabeated portals open within simple frames.

The interior is Neoclassical, with a single nave and four apsidal side chapels. The covering consists of barrel vaults and becomes a dome at the crossing. In the first chapel to the right of the entrance is a wooden group representing the Crucifix with the Madonna and Saint John, made in 1697 by the Foligno artist Antonio Calcioni.

On the second and third altars are two urns, the first containing the body of Blessed Angela da Montegiove, the second the remains of the Franciscan blesseds Philip and James, killed at Bevagna in 1377 by Breton mercenaries in the service of the Trinci. On the second altar to the left is the body of Blessed Angela of Foligno and a canvas by Gaetano Gandolfi representing her. On the third altar to the left is the Madonna della Misericordia. On the high altar is Saint Francis Receiving the Stigmata (1856) by Pasquale Sarullo. The apse basin is decorated with frescoes from the late 18th century, while the sacristy and the chapel of San Matteo retain fragmentary 14th-century fresco decoration. The bell tower, built in 1911, was raised in 1926 to make room for a bronze statue of Saint Francis.

Above the entrance to the convent is a fresco dated 1499 depicting the Virgin, Jesus, Saint John the Baptist, and Saint Francis. Inside is a small tabernacle with a Pietà, a good Renaissance sculpture in grey stone. The former refectory contains a large fresco by Pier Antonio of Foligno with Mary and Jesus at the centre, and Saints Catherine, Jerome, Blaise, the Blessed Pietro Crisci, Sebastian, and others. On the wall opposite the entrance is another large fresco in the manner of Mezzasti. A Crucifix with angels and saints is attributed to Buffalmacco.

The church also houses the remains of Blessed Martin, Blessed Matthew, Blessed Arnaldus, Blessed Pasqualina, Blessed Paoluccio Trinci, all connected with Foligno and the Franciscan orders.

The church was built in 1256 on the site associated with the martyrdom of Saint Messalina. The convent was established in 1255 on the site of an imperial palace granted by Alexander IV.

=== Santissima Annunziata ===
The church of the Santissima Annunziata was erected at the beginning of the 16th century. On the left wall is a Saint Michael the Archangel of the school of Niccolò Alunno, attributed to his son Lattanzio; another painting by the same artist shows a half-length Virgin with a rich frame, is dated June 1523 and signed by Lattanzio. In the right niche is the Baptism of Christ by Perugino. A painting of Saint Roch commending a devotee to Christ, dated 1497, is of Foligno school. A fresco in the sacristy depicting the Entombment of Christ is attributed to Lorenzo Lotto.

=== Santa Caterina ===
The church of Santa Caterina has a façade dating to the 14th century. The doorway is adorned with fine capitals, and above it opens a large circular window decorated with 24 small columns. On the left wall behind the second altar is a fresco of the Martyrdom of Saint Catherine by Dono Doni; a Transfiguration is attributed to the same artist, while the Marriage of Saint Catherine is of Venetian school. In the convent are frescoes of Florentine school representing the Virgin with the Child, the Martyrdom of Saint Barbara, and Saint Anthony preaching. Above the door leading to the parlor is a figure of a woman with Jesus and angels dated 1491, of the school of Niccolò Alunno. The corridor known as the Concezione recalls a painting by Guido Reni.

=== San Salvatore ===
The collegiate church of San Salvatore dates to the 14th century. On the façade to the right is a 15th-century fresco of the Flight into Egypt. In the choir is a 16th-century tapestry. In the sacristy is a tempera painting by Bartolomeo di Tommaso, dated 1430 and commissioned by Corrado Trinci, representing Mary enthroned with the Child, flanked by Saint John the Baptist and the Blessed.

=== Sant'Agostino ===
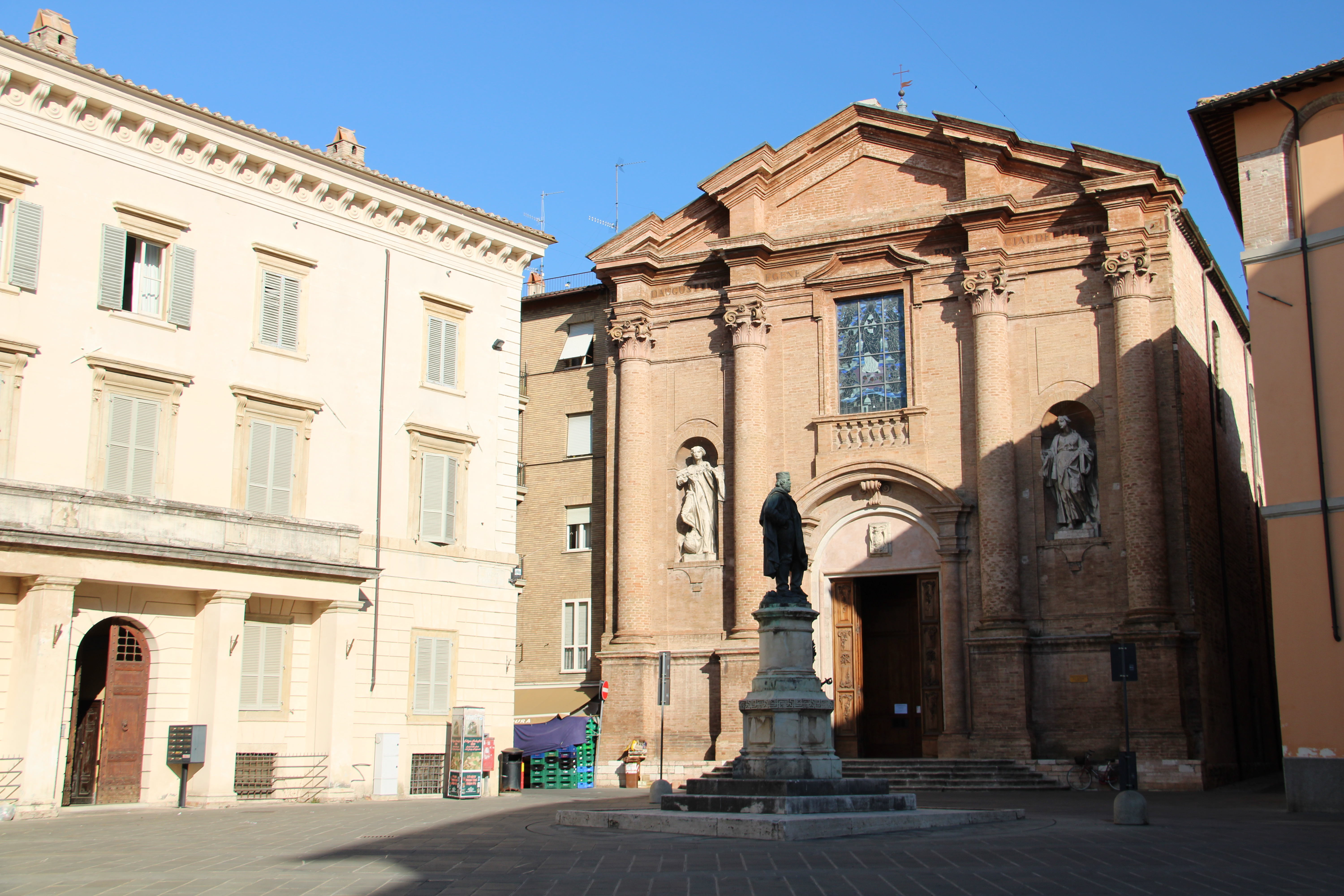
The front of the church of Sant'Agostino, punctuated by a central window flanked by sculptural niches

The church of Sant'Agostino was built at the end of the 15th century, though little remains from that period apart from the bell tower and the carved wooden door panels. Inside, at the second altar on the left wall, is a painting of the Madonna of the Belt with Jesus, angels, and saints by Felice Damiano da Gubbio (1593). On the right wall, at the fourth altar, is a painting by Salimbeni depicting Christ on the Cross and Moses indicating the bronze serpent. The third altar contains a finely worked 15th-century gilt metal processional cross. The apse features a large gilded wooden structure decorated with statues, attributed to Grampini. In the sacristy is an oil painting of the Madonna del Soccorso in the manner of the school of Raphael.

=== Sant'Anna ===
The church of Sant'Anna is notable for having housed on the high altar the famous painting by Raphael known as the Madonna of Foligno, now in the Vatican Museums. The altar table and candlesticks date to 1565. To the right of the same altar is a painting of Mary enthroned with Jesus by Feliciano de Muti of Foligno.

In the adjoining convent, above the entrance door, is a fresco depicting Mary with the Redeemer, Saint Anne, and the Blessed Angelina by Mezzasti. The first cloister contains frescoes illustrating scenes from the life of the Virgin and of Jesus Christ. In the second cloister are figures of Saint Agnes, Saint Catherine, Saint Ursula, Saint Apollinaris, Saint Elizabeth, Saint Anne, and other saints, works of Umbrian school. The chamber of the Blessed Angelina preserves frescoes of Foligno school showing the Blessed receiving a vision, the Crucifix, the Death of the Redeemer, and other subjects. The refectory contains 16th-century paintings of the Last Supper, the Wedding at Cana, and Christ in the house of Martha. In the inner choir are large fresco compositions representing the Epiphany and the Nativity, attributed to the school of Raphael.

=== San Nicolò ===
The church of San Nicolò contains, on its right wall, a large triptych regarded as the masterpiece of Niccolò Alunno of Foligno. The lower predella, depicting five scenes of the Passion of Christ, is missing and is preserved in the Louvre, having not been returned after the painting was taken to Paris during the First Empire. The predella bears a Latin inscription indicating that the work was executed by Niccolò Alunno for a bequest by Brigida of the noble Elmi family and dated 1492. The central panels depict the Nativity and Resurrection of Christ, surrounded by figures of Saint John, Saint Michael, Saint Nicholas, Saint Sebastian, the four Doctors of the Church, and other saints on a gold background.

In a chapel near the sacristy is another painting by Niccolò Alunno showing the Virgin crowned by Christ with Saint Anthony Abbot and Saint Bernardino of Siena; the predella shows two angels holding a cartouche and half-length figures of Jesus, Mary, and John. In the sacristy is a tempera painting of Mary with the Child and angels of Sienese school, and a decorated wooden bench painted by Valle.

=== San Giacomo ===
The church of San Giacomo was built in the 14th century, as indicated by inscriptions within the building. Inside is a tempera painting of Saint Roch presenting devotees to Christ by Pier Antonio of Foligno. A finely worked gilt processional cross with enamel figures, dating to the 15th century, is also preserved there.

=== Santa Maria in Campis ===
The church of Santa Maria in Campis stands about 2 kilometres (1.2 mi) south of Foligno, toward Sant'Eraclio, in the area of a large necropolis connected with the Roman city of Fulginia. It lay along the route of the Via Flaminia and was one of four religious buildings arranged at a distance of one mile from the tomb of Saint Felician, later incorporated into the cathedral.

Of Paleochristian origin, it was largely rebuilt after the earthquake of 1832. The interior, with three naves, contains votive decoration and several 15th-century family chapels entirely covered with wall paintings, including the Trinci chapel with a Crucifixion and Stories of Saint Thomas, regarded as the earliest work of Niccolò Alunno, dated 1456.

The church was formerly entirely decorated with frescoes in the manner of Benozzo Gozzoli.

=== Santa Lucia ===
The church of Santa Lucia has a Madonna of Humility after Sassoferrato behind the high altar. Above the convent door is a fresco by Mezzasti depicting the Virgin, Jesus, Saint Clare, and Saint Lucy. The convent contains numerous paintings; in the choir is a work of the school of Mezzasti showing Jesus and Mary with forty saints. In the old church are tempera paintings attributed to Bernardino di Perugia, and in the former refectory a large monochrome fresco of the 14th century. Near the church is a small chapel containing a terracotta group with the Virgin, Christ, and Saint John within a garland of fruit and leaves, attributed to the Della Robbia.

The monastery was the starting point in 1425 for the reform of the Second Order of Saint Clare.

=== Sassovivo Abbey ===
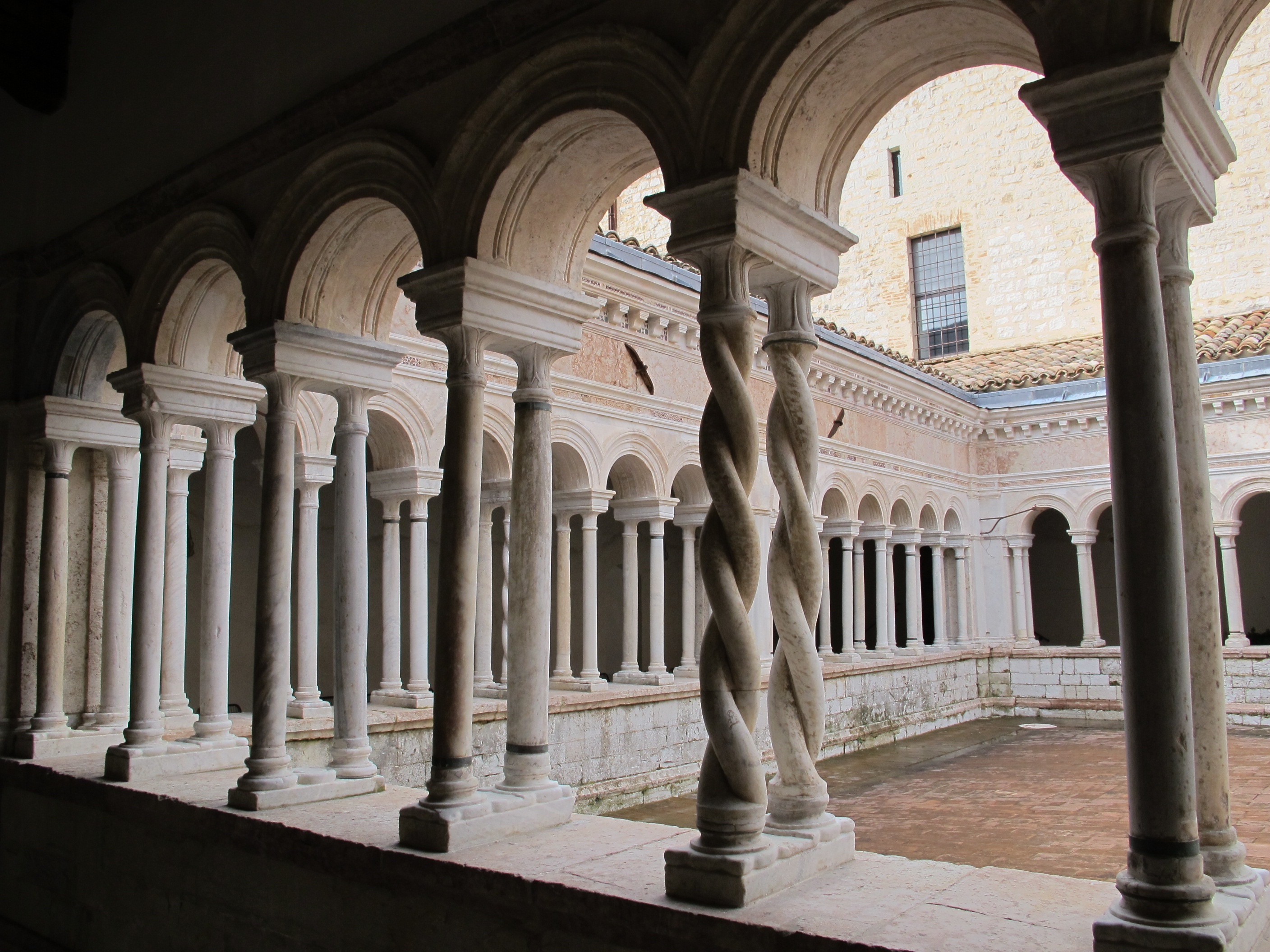
Arcaded perimeter with paired slender columns in the cloister of Sassovivo Abbey

Sassovivo Abbey stands a few kilometers from Foligno, on the slopes of Monte Aguzzo, above a holm oak forest covering the surrounding mountains. The abbey complex is enclosed within a circuit wall and arranged around two courtyards.

The upper cloister, built between 1229 and 1232, consists of a portico with 128 paired columns supporting 58 round arches. The architectural elements were produced in Rome in the workshop of Vassalletto and assembled on site, with mosaic cornices executed by Nicola Vassalletto. On the north side is a frescoed lunette dated 1280 depicting the Virgin and Child.Of the original structure, only the perimeter walls, the substructures on the lower side supporting the monastery rooms, and the Romanesque cloister remain.

At the center of the courtyard is a well-head dated 1623. The refectory contains a fresco of the Last Supper dated 1595. Fragments of monochrome frescoes from the early 15th century survive in the Loggia del Paradiso, a transitional space between the exterior and interior of the monastic complex.

The abbey was founded in 1082 by the hermit Mainardo. In the early 13th century Abbot Niccolò enlarged the church and initiated the construction of the cloister. In 1314 Abbot Filippo XXIV raised the east wing, altering the lighting of the church.

By the early 13th century the abbey controlled 92 monasteries, 41 churches, and 7 hospitals. Its activity is documented by an archive of approximately 7,500 documents dating from the 11th century onward, now kept in the Diocesan Archive of Spoleto.

At the beginning of the 15th century the abbey entered a period of decline. In 1467 Pope Paul II placed it in commendam, by which time its patrimony had already been partly dispersed. The abbey was suppressed in 1814, and after damage from the earthquake of 1832 the monks ceded their rights in 1834 to the bishops of Foligno. In 1860 the complex passed to the state, the episcopal mensa, and a private owner. In 1979 it was occupied by the Little Brothers of Jesus Caritas.

=== Other religious buildings ===
The church of San Giovanni dell’Acqua bears an inscription dated 1379, indicating its construction in the 14th century. The interior contains only traces of frescoes that once decorated the vault and sacristy walls. The church stands near the Roman bridge known as Isola Bella.

The church of San Giovanni is situated near the Roman bridge known as Ponte della Pietra.

The church and convent of San Domenico were built in the 14th century, of which only the large entrance portal remains. The interior once contained numerous frescoes, later detached and preserved in the municipal picture gallery. In the adjoining cloister Fra Giovanni da Fiesole is said to have lived and painted, and the poet-bishop Frezzi also resided there.

The sanctuary of San Pietro di Cancelli lies about 8 miles (13 km) from the city in a mountainous area and is visited for cures of rheumatism.

The monastery of Santa Maria in Campis, belonging to the Olivetans, stands in the surrounding plain.

A monastery of the Cassinese congregation stands in the area called Mormozzone, associated with the martyrdom of Saint Felician in 253 under Emperor Decius.

The former convent of San Francesco contains in its garden remains regarded as those of a Roman imperial palace, where Emperor Decius is said to have resided in the 3rd century.

The convent of San Bartolomeo of the Observant Franciscans stands on a hilltop overlooking a narrow valley leading to Fonte Marrana, known for its clear and healthful waters.

The convent of the Capuchins stands on a higher nearby hill.

The Church of the Suffragio (18th century) was built with a Greek cross-layout and an Ionic style façade.

The Oratory of Nunziatella, built in Renaissance style by (attributed to) Francesco di Bartolomeo da Pietrasanta after a miraculous event in 1489. The rectangular oratory contains two altars on the back wall and one altar on each sidewall with paintings from several periods. Its most famous painting is "Baptism of Jesus" by Perugino (1507), commissioned by Giovanni Battista Morganti. A fragment of the miraculous image of the Virgin was enclosed in a tabernacle of gilded wood. It was placed in front of a fresco by Giovanni Antonio Pandolfi da Pesaro (1575), representing the Holy Spirit among angels with St. Feliciano and the Blessed Pietro Crisci. The sacristy contains a damaged fresco of the Pietà, recently attributed to Giannicola di Paolo. In the same room stands the printing press on which the first edition of Dante's Divina Commedia was printed on 11 April 1472.

== Culture ==
=== Palazzo Trinci ===
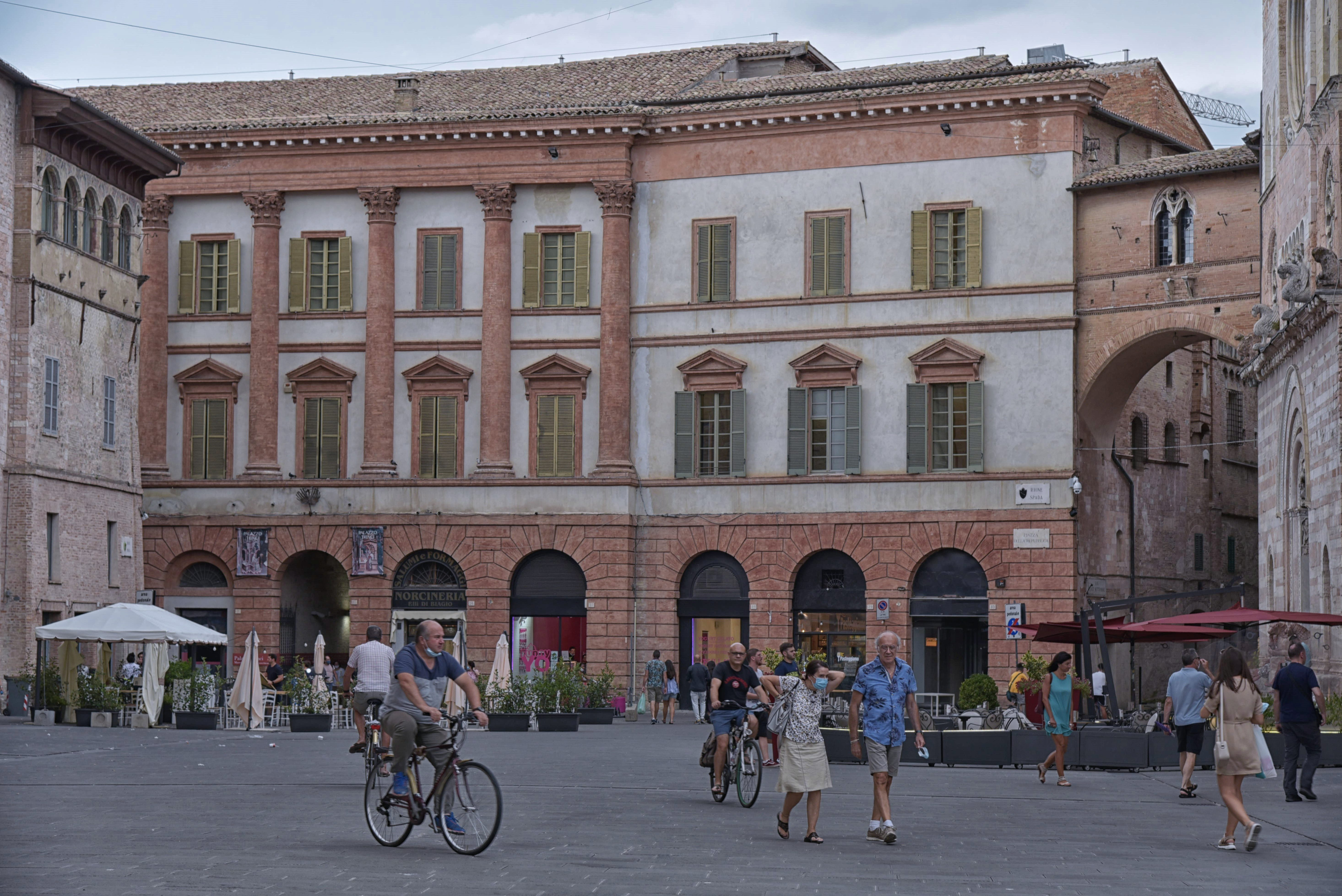
Palazzo Trinci showing an arched loggia at street level and a more formal upper register above

Palazzo Trinci stands on the north side of Piazza della Repubblica. It was built by the Trinci family and decorated by Gentile da Fabriano. The palace served as the seat of the Trinci lordship, and was erected between the late 14th and early 15th centuries at the initiative of Ugolino Trinci through the remodeling of pre-existing medieval buildings. Trincia II Trinci was thrown from its windows in 1377.

After the end of Trinci rule and the annexation of Foligno to the Papal State, the palace became the seat of the papal governors and retained that function until the unification of Italy, after which it was used for offices. With the loss of its original function, the building underwent various adaptations and modifications, also because of earthquake damage and wartime bombing during World War II. The present Neoclassical façade dates to the 19th century. The elevated passage on the right, linking the palace with the houses built above the side nave of the cathedral, preserves its brick facing and mullioned window from the early 15th century. Other 15th-century architectural elements survive in the courtyard, with its large brick portico and ribbed vaults.

A staircase on the right leads to the interior, now the seat of the city museum. On the first floor is the Gothic staircase, formerly open to the sky and decorated with geometric motifs. On the second floor is a large vestibule, the Sala Sisto IV, decorated with frescoes, ornamental and figural motifs, and covered by a wooden ceiling bearing the pope's coat of arms at the center. At the end of the room is the chapel, frescoed by Ottaviano Nelli with Stories from the Life of the Virgin and datable to 1424.

In the nearby loggia are the Stories of the Foundation of Rome, partly surviving only in sinopia. From the loggia one enters the Hall of the Liberal Arts and the Planets, where the arts of the trivium and quadrivium, philosophy, and the seven planets are represented together with the Ages of Man and the Hours of the Day. The corridor-passage linking the palace with the cathedral also presents the theme of the Ages of Man. The opposite wall is decorated with Heroes of Antiquity and Worthies of medieval tradition. The Hall of the Giants, reached through an adjoining room, is frescoed with large figures of heroes from Roman history, from Romulus to Trajan, dressed in Renaissance costume. Beneath the figures appear their names and Latin verses by the humanist Francesco da Fiano. An 18th-century notebook preserving the transcription of a 1411 document records that the decoration of the loggia, the Hall of the Planets, the Liberal Arts, and the Giants was entrusted to Gentile da Fabriano with the collaboration of some pupils.

Palazzo Trinci houses the Municipal Picture Gallery, with sections devoted to the 14th, 15th, and 16th centuries; the Archaeological Museum, with material relating to the Umbrian peoples of the Fulginates and the Plestini as well as the archaeological collection formed by the Trinci family; the Museum of the Municipal Institution, devoted to the history of municipal government in Foligno from the 15th century to the unification of Italy; and the Multimedia Museum of Tournaments, Jousts, and Games.

=== Palazzo Governativo ===
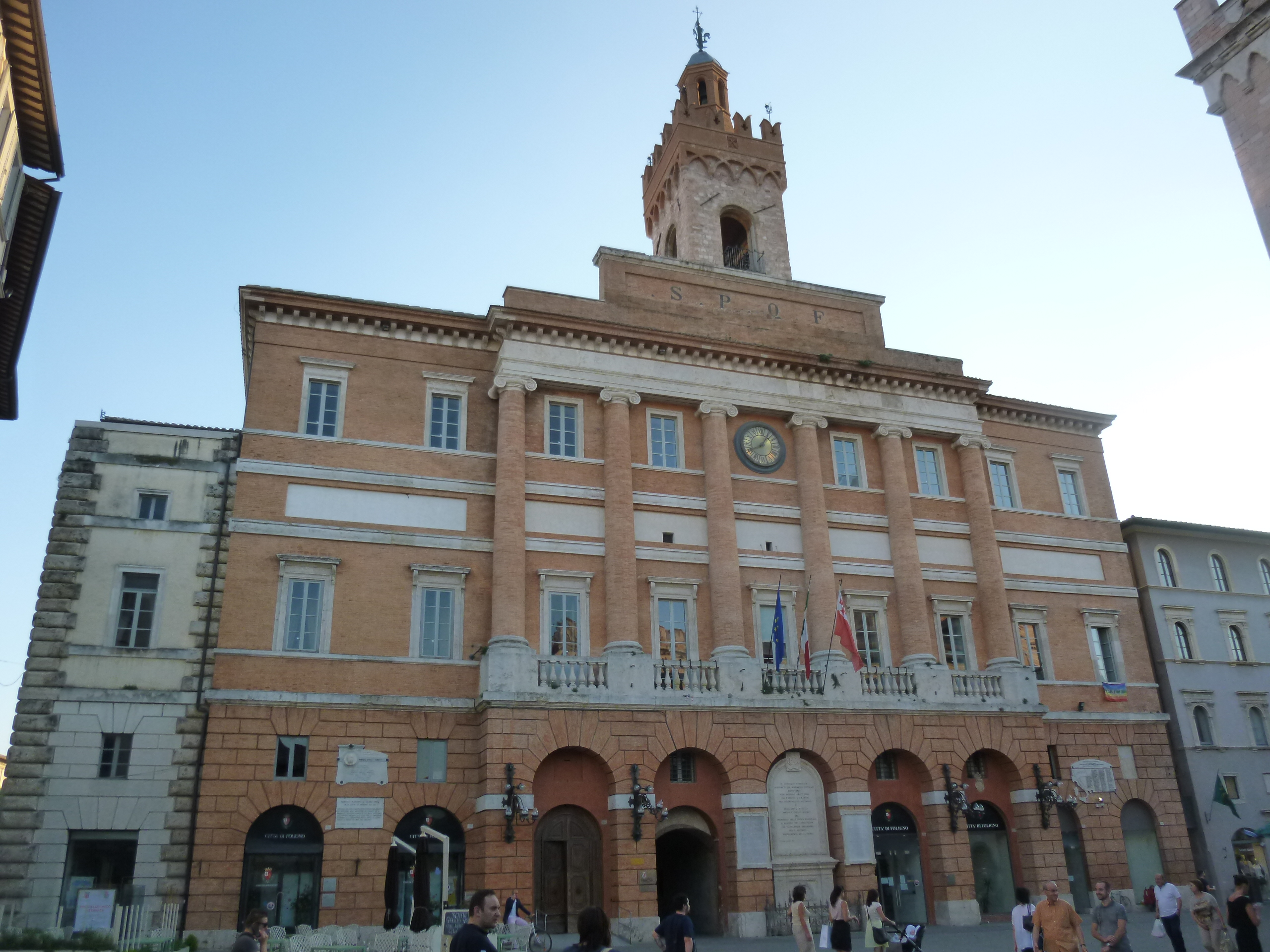
Façade of Palazzo Governativo, with a clock set into the central bay

The Palazzo Governativo was built by order of Giovanmaria, son of Ciccarello, and by Ventorello di Baso de Zitelli, a wealthy merchant of Foligno. A hall was decorated with paintings of ancient Roman captains accompanied by Latin epigrams and verses composed by Petrarch. Ugolino Trinci acquired the palace in 1398, and in 1439 it passed from the Trinci to the municipality.

The interior chapel, painted by Ottaviano Nelli, has a barrel vault. The vault depicts stories of Saint Joachim and Saint Anne; the semicircular space shows scenes from the life of the Virgin, including the Presentation in the Temple, the proclamation of Zechariah, the Marriage, and the Annunciation. The altar wall shows the Nativity with the date 1423; other walls depict the Epiphany, the Presentation in the Temple, the angel bringing the palm to Mary, the Apostles taking leave of Mary, the Dormition, the Funeral, and the Assumption. Figures of Saint Francis receiving the stigmata and other saints are also present. An antechamber contains frescoes discovered in 1864 of the school of Gentile da Fabriano, depicting Vestals praying, Rhea Silvia and Mars, the birth of Romulus and Remus, and the condemnation of Rhea Silvia. The great hall, later divided, contains figures of Roman heroes with Latin verses summarizing their deeds.

=== Former church of Bethlem ===
The church of Bethlem was formerly dedicated to Saint Anthony. Frescoes of scenes from the life of that saint at the high altar are by Fantini of Bevagna. The church has been converted into the municipal picture gallery.

Among the works preserved there are two fragments of an Epiphany by Doni; fresco fragments depicting Mary enthroned with Jesus, various angels, Saint Roch, and Saint Dominic by Mezzasti; and a monochrome candlestick composition with the Crucifix at the center, Saint Mary Magdalene, and Saints Peter, Paul, and John, also by Mezzasti. The collection includes numerous ancient and medieval inscriptions, remains of Roman works formerly in the municipal palace, and a Roman sarcophagus decorated with scenes of circus games.

=== Other secular buildings ===
Palazzo Orfini stands in the main square and is decorated with refined ornament, representing an elegant example of Renaissance architecture. Above the entrance, alongside the date 1515, is a finely designed capital bearing an eagle, the emblem of the family.

The palaces of the marquises Barugi and of the Montogli family date to the same period, with finely carved architectural elements; the Montogli palace remains unfinished in its upper part.

Palazzo Nuti Deli is attributed to the Florentine architect Baccio d'Agnolo. Its façade is divided into three levels, and the entrance has finely carved doors.

Ospedale Vecchio is a stately Renaissance building (1517–1520) with an eleven-arch portico on the Corso Cavour.

The former church of the Santissima Trinità is a Neoclassical building by Carlo Murena, a pupil of Luigi Vanvitelli, now serving as the second museum site of Foligno's Centro Italiano Arte Contemporanea. La Calamita Cosmica is a work of contemporary art by Gino De Dominicis housed in the former church. The sculpture represents a monumental anthropomorphic skeleton, distinguished by a bird's beak in place of the nose.

The Fontana in memoria dei Caduti by Ivan Theimer is a work of contemporary art, created on the site of the 17th-century Palazzo Rodati, which was destroyed in the bombing of March 1944. Foligno also preserves another work by Theimer, the monument to Giuseppe Piermarini.

=== Archeology ===
Three bridges of Roman date remain on the Topino. One supports the walls at the point where the river enters the city. A second, known as Ponte della Pietra, stands near the church of San Giovanni. A third, known as Isola Bella, is located near the church of San Giovanni dell'Acqua.

The fortified site of Monte di Pale preserves evidence of an upland defensive settlement, identified as an oppidum or castellum. Additional archaeological indicators include a group of tombs dating to around the 5th century BCE discovered near Foligno at Madonna del Sasso. Furthermore, an inscription mentioning two magistrates (marones), T. Foltonius and Sex. Petronius, dated to the 2nd century BCE and found east of the Via Flaminia, suggests organized territorial occupation even before the urban expansion of Fulginiae.

The precise location of ancient Fulginiae has long been debated. Archaeological discoveries within the historic center of Foligno are limited, consisting mainly of Roman imperial-era burials (notably cappuccina-type tombs) and reused squared stone blocks.

=== Other cultural aspects ===
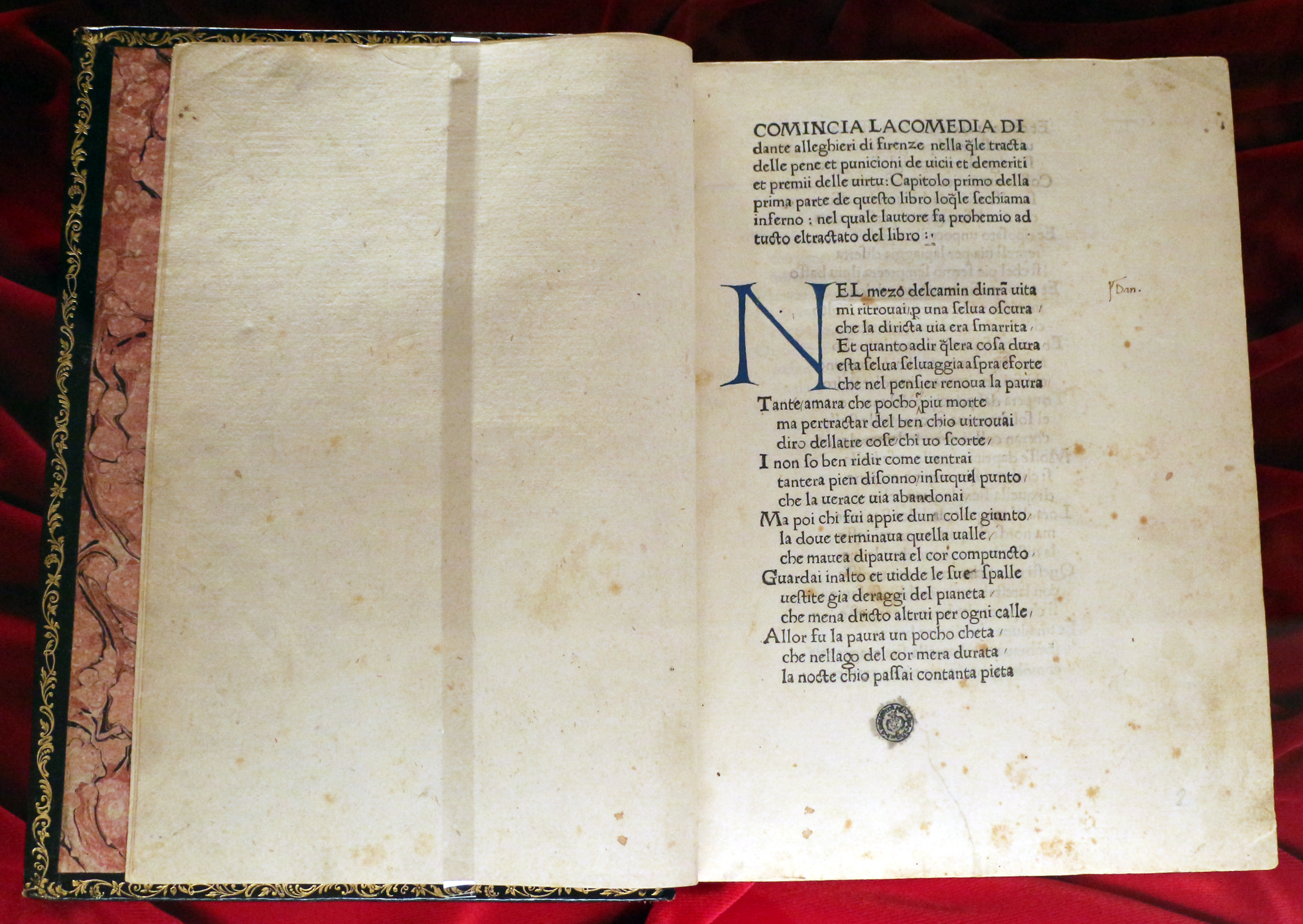
Editio princeps of the Divine Comedy, printed in Foligno in 1472.

The first printed edition of Dante's Divina Commedia was printed in the Orfini Palace at Foligno on 5 and 6 April 1472 by Johannes Numeister and Evangelista Angelini, when the sheets for 300 copies were made. At the end of 17th century there were four newspapers printed in Foligno. In the 18th century, both Foligno and nearby Spello produced the famous almanac Barbanera.

Several academies have existed in the town, including the Rinvigoriti, the Umbri, the Forti, and the Fulginea.

At the entrance to the city is a public promenade with gardens, where in 1872 a marble monument was erected to the painter Niccolò Alunno.

== Events ==
=== Giostra della Quintana ===
The Giostra della Quintana is a knight ring jousting tournament based on a historical event. It takes place in the town of Foligno. Actually the challenges take place in June (1st Challenge) during a Saturday night and September (the counter-challenge) the 2nd or 3rd Sunday of September.

The definition of Quintana comes from the 5th road of the Roman military Camps, where the soldiers were trained to the lance fighting. They run against a dummy-soldier, trying to catch a ring hanging from an arm of the dummy. Here the origin of the tournament's name, but the first definition and documented "Quintana" as a knights' jousting tournament during a festival, dates back to 1448. Since then, Foligno's "Quintana" was held uninterruptedly every year. In 1946 the actual "Giostra della Quintana" was reborn. In 1613 the Priors included the Quintana in the events of Carnival festivals, and all has been historically documented.

There are ten knights, each representing a quarter of the town. Rushing at gallop, they have to catch 3 rings having smaller size at each tournament. The rings are hanging from a rotating statue represent Mars, the Roman God of War. The statue is in oak original dating back until 1613 (17th century) having a shield and a straight arm. A number of happenings involve the whole town and a parade of 800 persons dressed in original-like precious dresses walk in the town the day before the joust takes place.

== Notable people ==
Foligno produced numerous notable figures in science, literature, and the arts. These include Federico Frezzi, theologian and poet, author of the Quadriregio; Gentile Gentili, physician and commentator on Avicenna; and the historian and writer Sigismondo de' Conti.

Military figures include members of the Trinci family, Robba-Castelli, commander of Milanese forces against Frederick I, Giambattista di Costantino Orfini, participant in the Battle of Lepanto, and Carlo dei Conti Frenfanelli, leader of papal armies.

Emiliano degli Orfini contributed to the reputation of the mint of Foligno and supported early printing, hosting Johannes Numeister, who printed works in 1470 and 1472 including the first Italian edition of the Divine Comedy. Artists include Niccolò Alunno, Mezzasti, Bartolomeo di Tommaso, Pietro Mazzaforte, Michelini, and Leopardi.

Cardinals from Foligno include Lucino Trinci, Domenico Trinci, Giovanni Vitelleschi, Luigi Ercolani, Viviano Orfini, and Alessandro Bernabò. Saints and blessed figures from Foligno include the martyrs Eraclius, Justus, and Maurus, Saint Rainaldo, Blessed Philip and John, Angela of Foligno, and Antonia of Florence (1402–1472), Franciscan and saint.

Other notable figures include the architect Giuseppe Piermarini; the hydraulic engineer Francesco Jacobilli; the mathematician Antonio Rutili-Gentili; the scholar Feliciano Scarpellini; the physician Giuseppe Girolami; Antimo Liberati, music theorist, composer, and singer; Fra Umile da Foligno, Franciscan friar and painter; Mariano Armellino, Benedictine historian; and Liborio Coccetti, painter.

== International relations ==
=== Twin towns — Sister cities ===
Foligno is twinned with:

- Gemona del Friuli, Italy
- La Louvière, Belgium
- Shibukawa, Japan
