= Raimond van Marle =

Valentin Raimond Silvain van Marle (1887-18 November 1936) was a Dutch historian and art historian specialising in medieval history and Italian painting, particularly attentive to sociological relations.

He is best known for his 19-volume The Development of the Italian Schools of Painting, dealing with Italian painting from the Romanesque era to the end of the 15th century. It was published between 1923 and 1938 in Dutch, French, English and Italian - he completed 17 of the 21 volumes he had planned, with Frederick Mason Perkins and his widow Charlotte van Marle completing the work and producing the 19th volume and the general index. The first two volumes were translated into Italian by Alba Buitoni in 1938.

== Life ==
Born in the Hague to a Hungarian mother and a father of distant Picard descent (hence his surname Marle), he moved to Paris in 1906. He studied at the École des chartes and the École Pratique des Hautes Etudes. In 1910 he gained a doctorate from the Sorbonne. His first writings dealt with medieval Dutch history - in 1908 he published Le Comté de Hollande sous Philippe le Bon and in 1916 a Dutch-language study of Meister Eckhart (De mystieke leer van Meister Eckhart).

In 1918, after marrying, he moved to a villa in the San Marco district of Perugia. Here, able to live off his income, he dedicated himself exclusively to art history. From then on he wrote several studies on Italian painting, collaborating with the Bollettino d'Arte and other international specialist journals. His other works included the 2-volume Iconographie de l'art profane au Moyen-Âge et à la Renaissance, et la décoration des demeures(1931-1932).

When he died he had two other texts in preparation. The racial hatred of Fascist Italy led it to be hostile to foreign art historians and so after his death in Perugia he was buried not there but in distant Pozzale, a district of Pieve di Cadore.

== Works ==
- Le Comté de Hollande sous Philippe le Bon (in French). The Hague: Martinus Nijhoff. 1908.
- Hoorn au Moyen Âge. Son histoire et ses institutions jusqu'au début du seizième siècle (in French). The Hague: Martinus Nijhoff. 1910.
- De mystieke leer van Meister Eckehart (in Dutch). Haarlem: J.W. Boissevain. 1916.
- Recherches sur l'iconographie de Giotto et de Duccio (in French). Strasbourg: J.H.E. Heitz. 1920.
- Simone Martini et les peintres de son école (in French). Strasbourg: J.H.E. Heitz. 1920.
- La peinture romaine au Moyen Âge. Son développement du sixième jusqu'à la fin du treizième siècle (in French). Strasbourg: J.H.E. Heitz. 1921.
- The Development of the Italian Schools of Painting. 19 vols. The Hague: Martinus Nijhoff. 1923–38.
- Iconographie de l'art profane au Moyen-Âge et à la Renaissance, et la décoration des demeures. 1. La vie quotidienne. 2. Allégories et symboles (in French). The Hague: Martinus Nijhoff. 1931–32.

== Bibliography ==
- (in Italian) Lionello Puppi (2014). La tomba dell'ebreo. Crocetta del Montello: Terra Ferma.
