= Pier Antonio Mezzastris =

Italian painter

Pier Antonio Mezzastris (or Pierantonio Mezastris; c. 1430 – c. 1506) was an Italian painter of the Quattrocento, painting in a somewhat provincial style for the time.

He was born at Foligno in Umbria. He painted religious subjects, working mostly in fresco, and was a local painter, in that all of his known works can be found within 15 km (10 mi) of his hometown, except for two frescoes in Narni. Though his subjects are very limited, his work is good, marked by technical ability and polish combined with elegance and delicacy of feeling. He is described as a follower of Benozzo Gozzoli. He should not be confused with Bernardino Mezzastris, a much lesser artist, possibly his son. His sister, Onofria, married Matteo da Gualdo, a painter from Foligno and active in Ancona and Norcia.

== Works ==
Definite works by Mezzastris include:

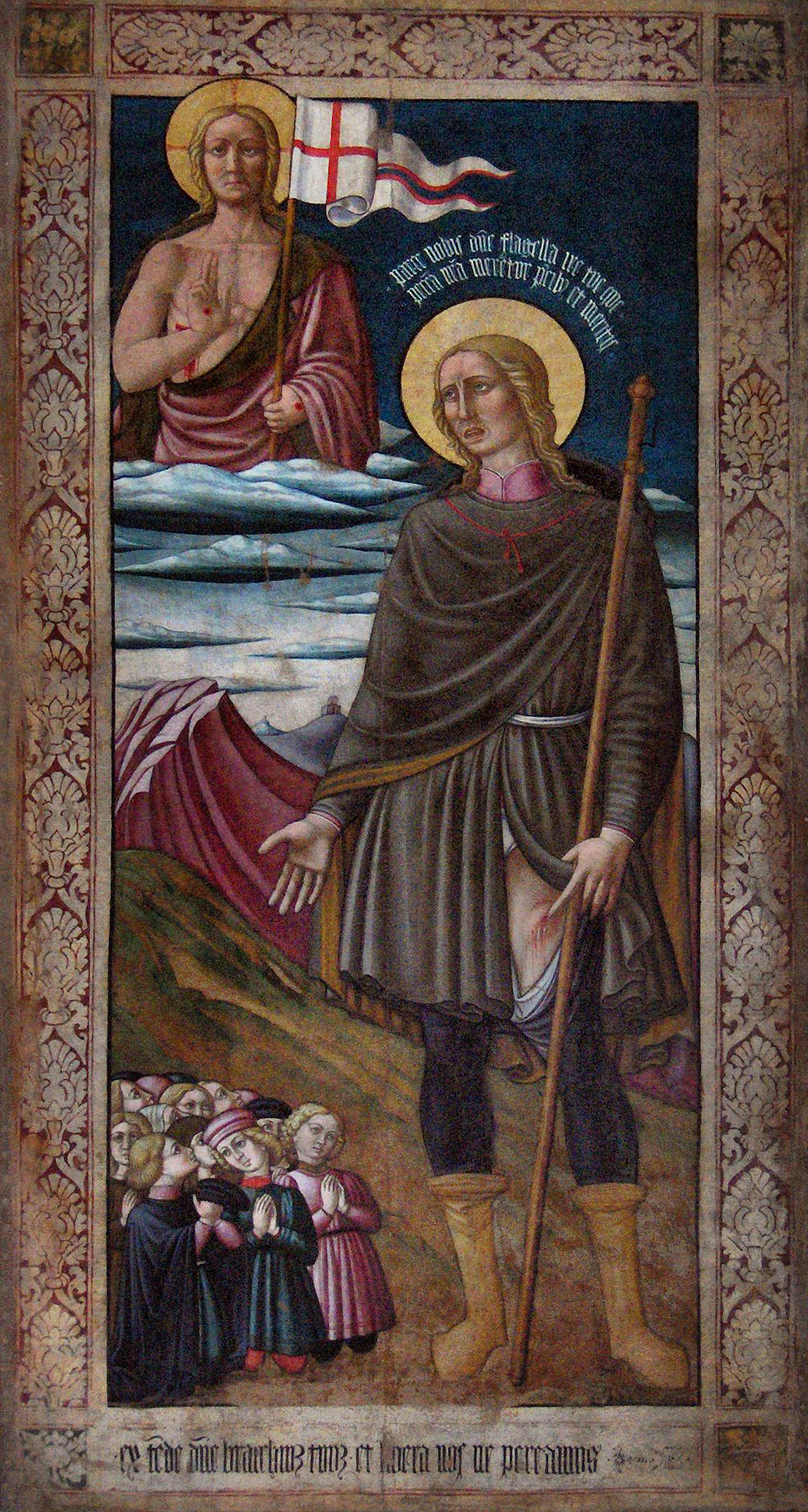
"St. Roch and the Redeemer " (c. 1480)

- Foligno:
  - Madonna & Saints (1486) and other detached frescoes now in Pinacoteca Civica,
  - Large monochrome fresco in the church of San Domenico
  - Madonna & Child with St Lucia and St Claire, fresco (1471) in monastery of S. Lucia
  - Madonna & Child with Two Female Saints, fresco in monastery of S. Anna
  - Madonna & Child with Angels, Saints, and Sibyls, in the church of Madonna della Fiamenga
  - Frescoes in the church of S. Maria in Campis, 2 km (1 mi) from Foligno
  - Madonna & Saints, frescoes in church of Vescia, 5 km (3 mi) from Foligno
- elsewhere:
  - Oratorio dei Pellegrini in Assisi: the frescoes of the vault, depicting the Doctors of the Church; on the walls, frescoes of St Anthony Abbot blessing the Camels, and of the Miracles of St James
  - Crucifixion (1482) in the convent of S. Damiano near Assisi
  - Madonna Worshipping the Child, with St Francis and St Anthony of Padua, in the church of S. Martino of Trevi
  - "St Anthony's Niche", with several frescoes, in the church of S. Francesco of Montefalco
  - Scenes from the life of St Francis, and Two Scenes from the life of St Benedict, in church of S. Francesco in Narni

Attributed to Mezzastris are:

- St Francis receiving Stigmata, in monastery of S. Anna of Foligno
- St Francis receiving Stigmata in San Girolamo, Spello
- Crucifixion (fresco, damaged), in church of S. Vincenzo of Bevagna
- Madonna and Child with Angel (very damaged), in church of S. Agostino of Montefalco
- Deposition, fresco in the Duomo of Narni
- "St. Roch and the Redeemer" (ca. 1480) " painting in the Church of San Giacomo (Foligno)
