= Chiesa =

Chiesa (Italian, 'church') may refer to:

== People with the surname ==
- Andrea Chiesa (born 1966), Swiss Formula One racer
- Anthony della Chiesa (1394–1459), Italian Dominican friar
- Bruno della Chiesa (born 1962), European linguist
- Deborah Chiesa (born 1996), Italian tennis player
- Enrico Chiesa (born 1970), Italian footballer
- Federico Chiesa (born 1997), Italian footballer, son of Enrico Chiesa
- Gemma Sena Chiesa (1929–2024), Italian archaeologist
- Giacomo della Chiesa (1854–1922), Italian bishop, became Pope Benedict XV
- Giulietto Chiesa (1940–2020), Italian journalist and politician
- Giulio Chiesa (1928–2010), Italian pole vaulter
- Gordon Chiesa, American basketball coach
- Guido Chiesa (born 1959), Italian director and screenwriter
- Jeffrey S. Chiesa (born 1965), U.S. Senator; American lawyer; former Attorney General of New Jersey
- Laura Chiesa (born 1971), Italian fencer
- Marco Chiesa (born 1974), Swiss politician
- Mario Chiesa (cyclist) (born 1966), Italian cyclist
- Mario Chiesa (politician) (born c1938), Italian politician
- Michael Chiesa (born 1987), American mixed martial artist
- Nicolás Chiesa (born 1980), Argentine football player and manager
- Ron Della Chiesa (born 1938), Boston radio personality
- Serge Chiesa (born 1950), French footballer
- Vivian Della Chiesa (1915–2009), American lyric soprano

== See also ==
- Church (disambiguation)
- Chiese (river), northern Italy
- Sonata da chiesa, a sacred musical form also known as church sonata
- La Chiesa, a 1989 religious horror film
- Chiesa in Valmalenco, comune in the Province of Sondrio in the Italian region Lombardy
- Chiesa Nuova (disambiguation)
- Dalla Chiesa
