= Assisi =

Town and administrative division in Italy

- Comune
- Comune di Assisi
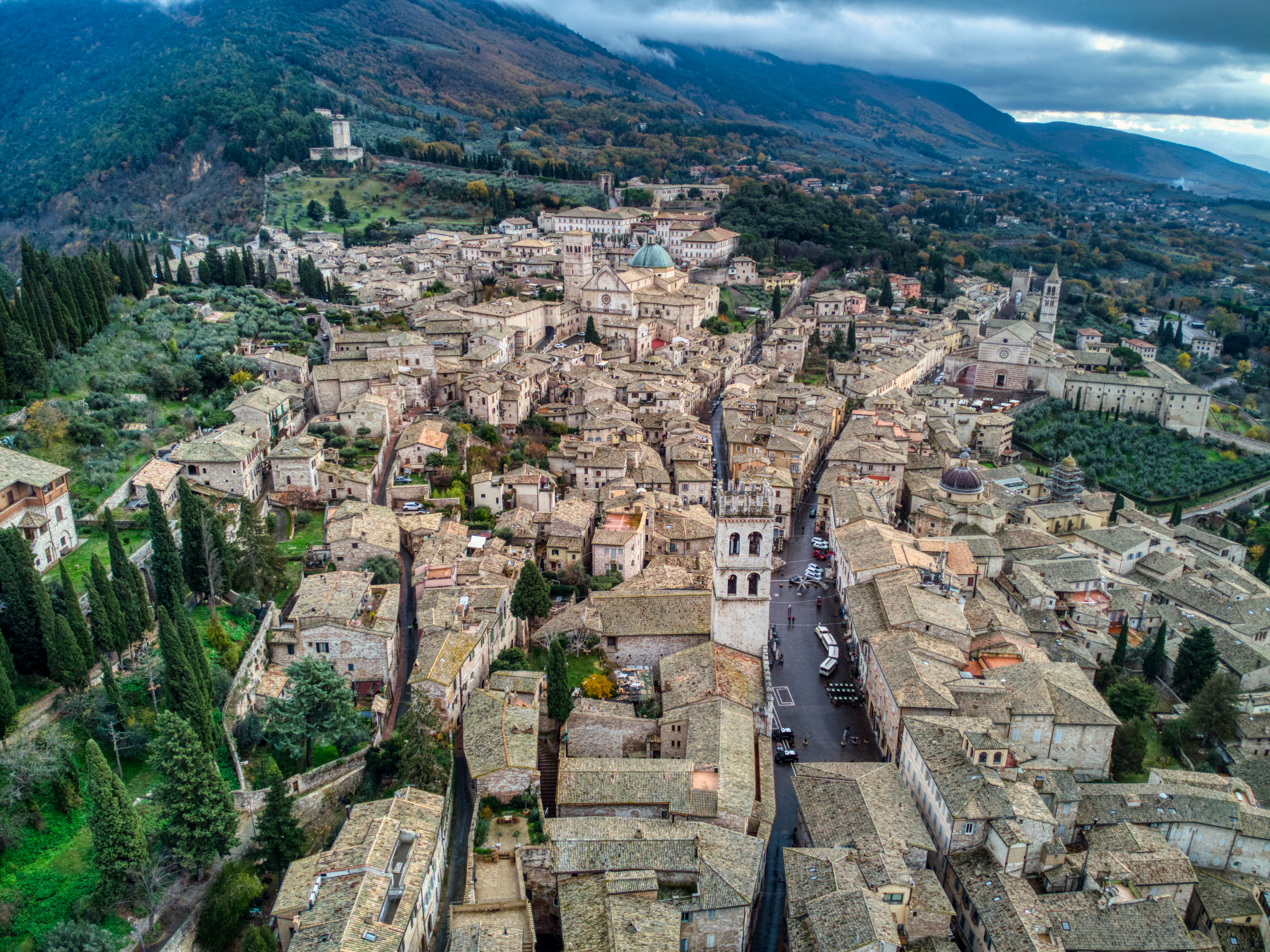
- Assisi

- Flag Coat of arms

- Location of Assisi in Umbria Assisi (Italy) Assisi (Europe)
- Coordinates: 43°04′33″N 12°37′03″E
- Country: Italy
- Region: Umbria
- Province: Perugia (PG)
- Frazioni: List: Armenzano, Capodacqua, Castelnuovo, Palazzo, Petrignano, Rivotorto, Santa Maria degli Angeli, San Vitale, Sterpeto, Torchiagina, Tordandrea, Tordibetto, Col d'Erba, Col d'Erba III, Collicello, Passaggio di Assisi, Pian della Pieve, Pieve San Nicolò, Podere Casanova, Ponte Grande, Renaiola, Rocca Sant'Angelo, San Damiano, San Gregorio, San Martino, San Martino Basso, San Presto, Santa Tecla, Tomba, Tombetta, Valecchie

Government
  - Mayor: Valter Stoppini (PD)

Area
  - Total: 186.8 km^{2} (72.1 sq mi)
- Elevation: 424 m (1,391 ft)

Population (1 January 2022)
  - Total: 27,862
  - Density: 149.2/km^{2} (386.3/sq mi)
- Demonym: Assisiani/Assisiati
- Time zone: UTC+1 (CET)
  - Summer (DST): UTC+2 (CEST)
- Postal code: 06081
- Dialing code: 075
- Patron saint: St. Rufinus of Assisi
- Saint day: 12 August
- Website: www.visit-assisi.it/en/

UNESCO World Heritage Site
- Official name: Assisi, the Basilica of San Francesco and Other Franciscan Sites
- Criteria: Cultural: i, ii, iii, iv, vi
- Reference: 990
- Inscription: 2000 (24th Session)
- Area: 14,563.25 ha (35,986.6 acres)
- Buffer zone: 4,086.7 ha (10,098 acres)

Assisi (/əˈsiːzi/, also /-iːzi, əˈsɪsi, -ɪzi/; Italian: [asˈsiːzi]; from Latin: Asisium; Old Italian: Ascesi) is a town and comune of Italy in the Province of Perugia in the Umbria region, on the western flank of Monte Subasio.

It is generally regarded as the birthplace of the Latin poet Propertius, born around 50–45 BC. It is the birthplace of St. Francis, who founded the Order of Friars Minor in that town in 1208, and of St. Clare of Assisi (Chiara d'Offreducci), who, with St. Francis, founded the Order of Poor Ladies, which later became the Order of Poor Clares after her death. In 1838, St. Gabriel of Our Lady of Sorrows was also born in Assisi.

== History ==
The earliest attested people of Assisi were the Umbri. In 77 AD Pliny the Elder described Regio VI Umbria and said that the Umbri were thought to be the oldest inhabitants of Italy. The people of Assisi were mentioned by name. The Romans took control of central Italy after the Battle of Sentinum in 295 BC. They built the flourishing municipium Asisium on a series of terraces on Monte Subasio. Roman remains can still be found in Assisi: city walls, the forum (now Piazza del Comune), a theatre, an amphitheatre and the Temple of Minerva (now transformed into the Church of Santa Maria sopra Minerva). In 1997, the remains of a Roman villa were also discovered containing several well-preserved rooms with frescoes and mosaics in a condition rarely found outside sites such as Pompei.

The Augustan-age poet Propertius is considered to have been born in what is now the city of Assisi.

In 238 AD Assisi was converted to Christianity by bishop Rufino, who was martyred at Costano. According to tradition, his remains rest in the Cathedral Church of San Rufino in Assisi.

The Ostrogoths of king Totila destroyed most of the town in 545. Assisi then came under the rule of the Lombards as part of the Lombard and then Frankish Duchy of Spoleto.

The thriving commune became an independent Ghibelline commune in the 11th century. Constantly struggling with the Guelph Perugia, it was during one of those battles, the battle at Collestrada, that Giovanni di Bernardone (better known as St. Francis of Assisi) was taken prisoner, setting in motion the events that eventually led him to live as a beggar, renounce the world and establish the Order of Friars Minor.

The city, which had remained within the confines of the Roman walls, began to expand outside these walls in the 13th century. In this period the city was under papal jurisdiction. The Rocca Maggiore, the imperial fortress on top of the hill above the city, which had been plundered by the people in 1189, was rebuilt in 1367 on orders of the papal legate, cardinal Gil de Albornoz.

In the beginning, Assisi fell under the rule of Perugia and later under several despots, such as the soldier of fortune Biordo Michelotti, Gian Galeazzo Visconti and his successor Francesco I Sforza, dukes of Milan, Jacopo Piccinino and Federico II da Montefeltro, lord of Urbino. The city went into a deep decline through the plague of the Black Death in 1348.

The city came again under papal jurisdiction under the rule of Pope Pius II (1458–1464).

In 1569 construction was started of the Basilica of Santa Maria degli Angeli. During the Renaissance and in later centuries, the city continued to develop peacefully, as the 17th-century palazzi of the Bernabei and Giacobetti attest.

Now the site of many a pilgrimage, Assisi is linked in legend with its native son, St. Francis. The gentle saint founded the Franciscan order and shares honours with St. Catherine of Siena as the patron saint of Italy. He is remembered by many, even non-Christians, as a lover of nature (his preaching to an audience of birds is one of the legends of his life).

During World War II Assisi was occupied by Nazi Germany in September 1943. To save Jews in Italy the Catholic Church started the Assisi Network and hid Jews in the city. As the Allies moved up Italy, Germany declared Assisi an open city and pulled out, turning the city over to Italian partisans. The 12th Royal Lancers (Prince of Wales) entered the city on 17 June 1944. Colonel Valentin Müller, a German medical officer and a Catholic, was able to make Assisi a German hospital city for German troops in Italy in the summer of 1944, helping save Assisi from destruction, unlike Cassino.

Assisi was hit by two devastating earthquakes that shook Umbria in September 1997. But although much remains to be done, the recovery and restoration have been remarkable. Massive damage was caused to many historical sites, but the major attraction, the Basilica di San Francesco, reopened less than two years later.

== Main sights ==
=== UNESCO World Heritage Site ===
UNESCO collectively designated the Franciscan structures of Assisi as a World Heritage Site in 2000, under the name Assisi, the Basilica of San Francesco and Other Franciscan Sites. The inscription comprises two main areas:

==== Historic centre of Assisi and surrounding sites ====
Basilica of Saint Francis of Assisi
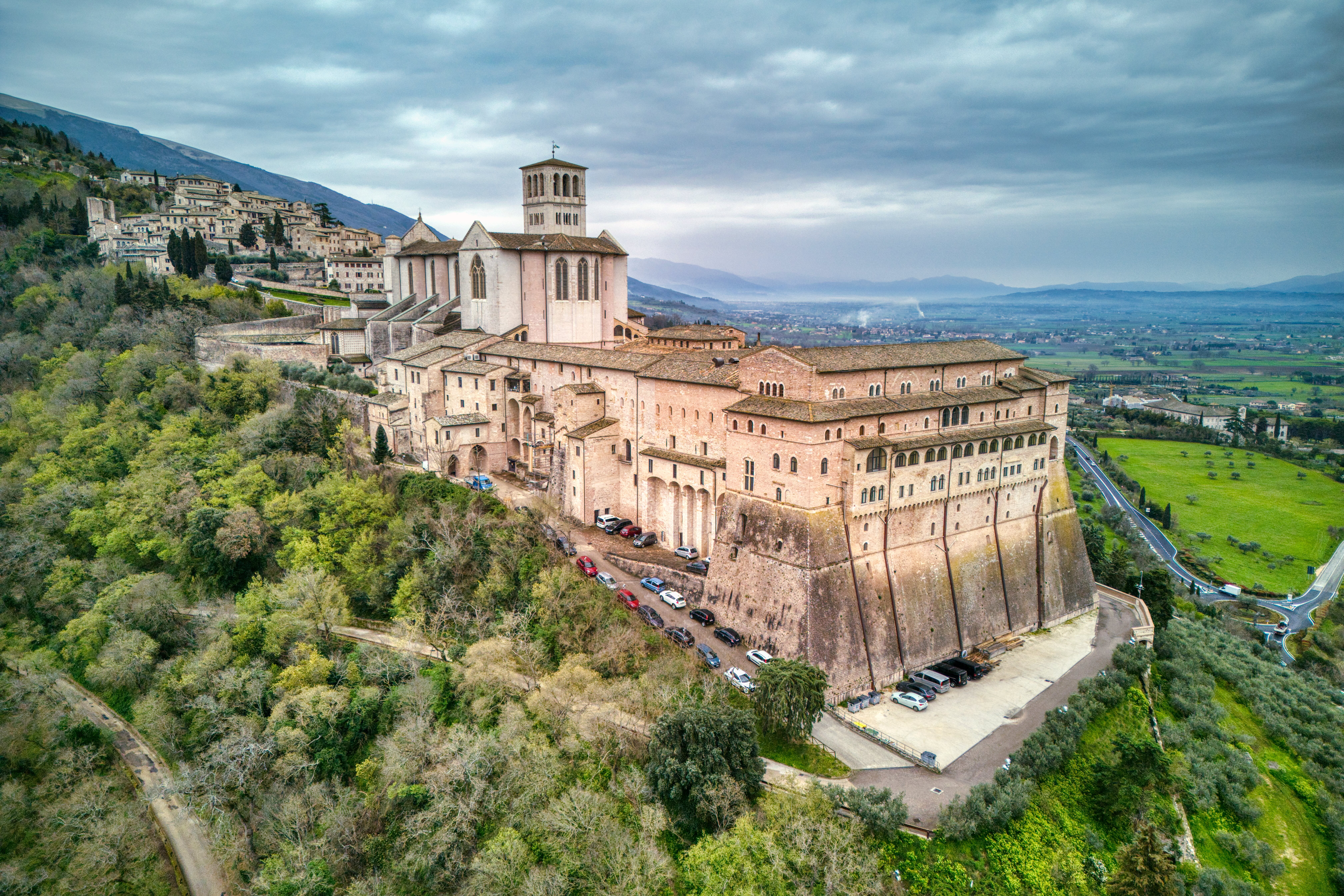
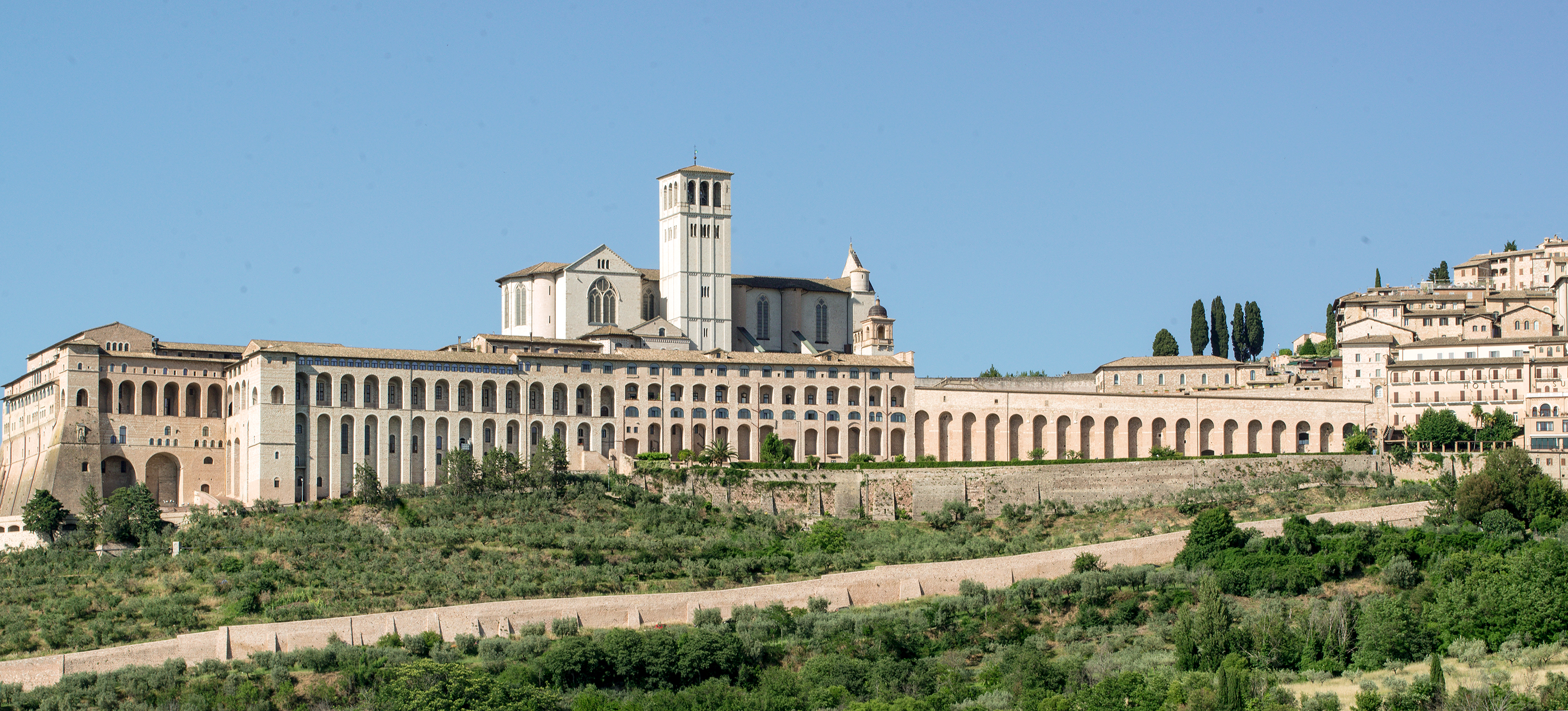
- Basilica of San Francesco d'Assisi: Constructed between 1228 and 1253 following the canonization of St. Francis, the complex includes the Sacro Convento and the lower (Basilica inferiore) and upper (Basilica superiore) churches. The lower church features frescoes by Cimabue and Giotto, while the upper church contains scenes from the life of St. Francis, once attributed to Giotto but now believed to be the work of painters from the Roman school of Pietro Cavallini. The basilica suffered severe damage during a 5.5-magnitude earthquake on 26 September 1997, which caused part of the vault to collapse, killing four people and destroying a fresco by Cimabue. Restoration took two years.
- The Piazza Inferiore di San Francesco.
- Church of San Damiano: One of the first churches restored by St. Francis, and the site of one of his most famous visions. It was later given to St. Clare as the first home of the Poor Clares.
- Eremo delle Carceri: a small monastery with a church at a canyon above the town, where St. Francis retreated and preached to birds
- The Santuario di Rivotorto, a sanctuary marking the site of Francis's early communal life.
- Cathedral of San Rufino (St. Rufinus): church with a façade in Romanesque style with three rose windows and a 16th‑century interior; part of it is built on a cistern from the Roman era. Location of the baptism of both St. Francis and St. Clare and the surviving font carved out of a granite Roman column.
- Basilica of Santa Chiara (St. Clare): Begun in 1257, this church is characterized by its massive lateral buttresses, a prominent rose window, and a simple Gothic interior. It contains 13th-century frescoes and paintings, as well as the tomb of its namesake saint, Saint Clare of Assisi.
- The historic urban fabric of Assisi itself and its surrounding cultural landscape.

==== Santa Maria degli Angeli and Porziuncola ====
Basilica of Santa Maria degli Angeli
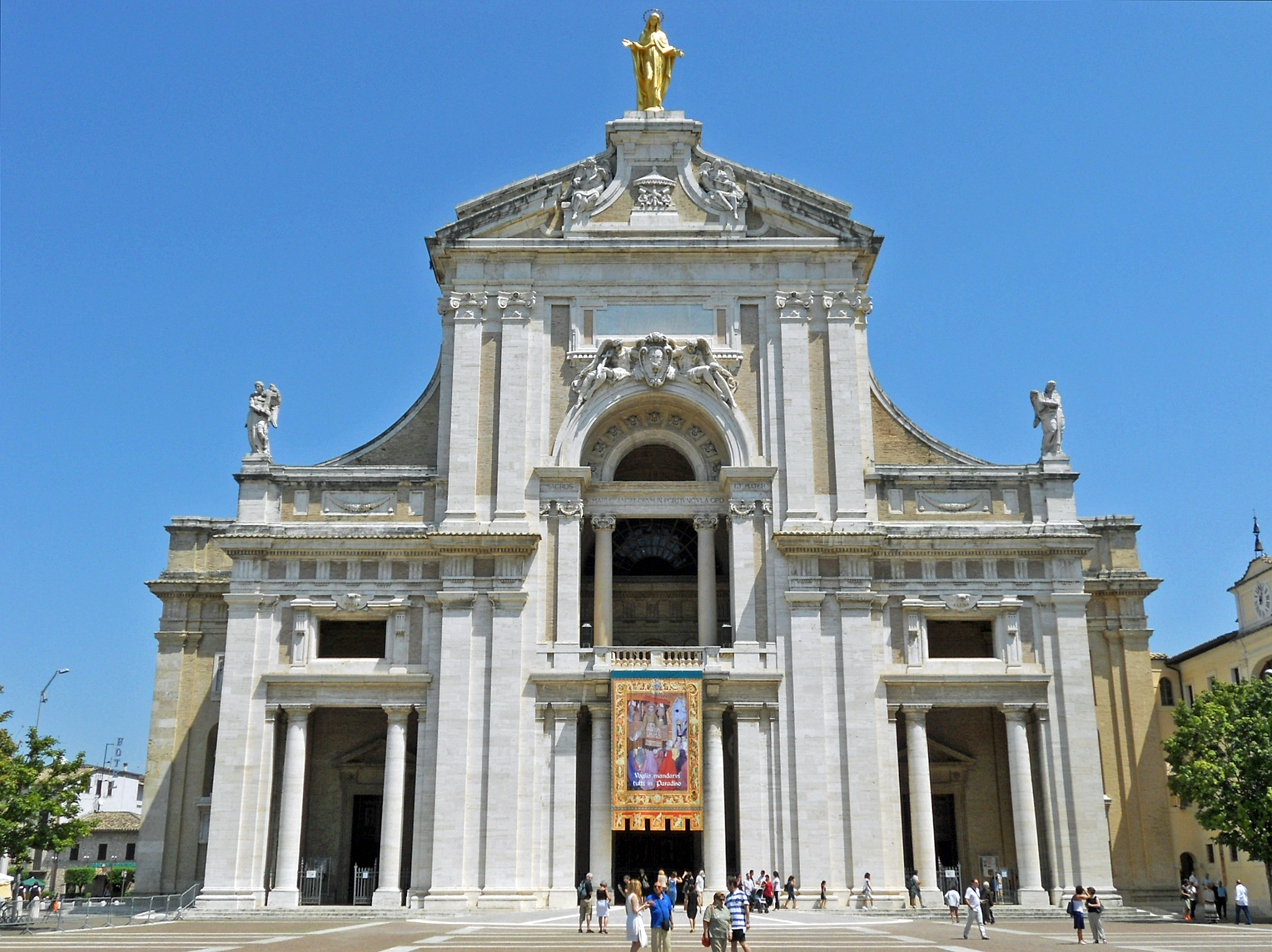
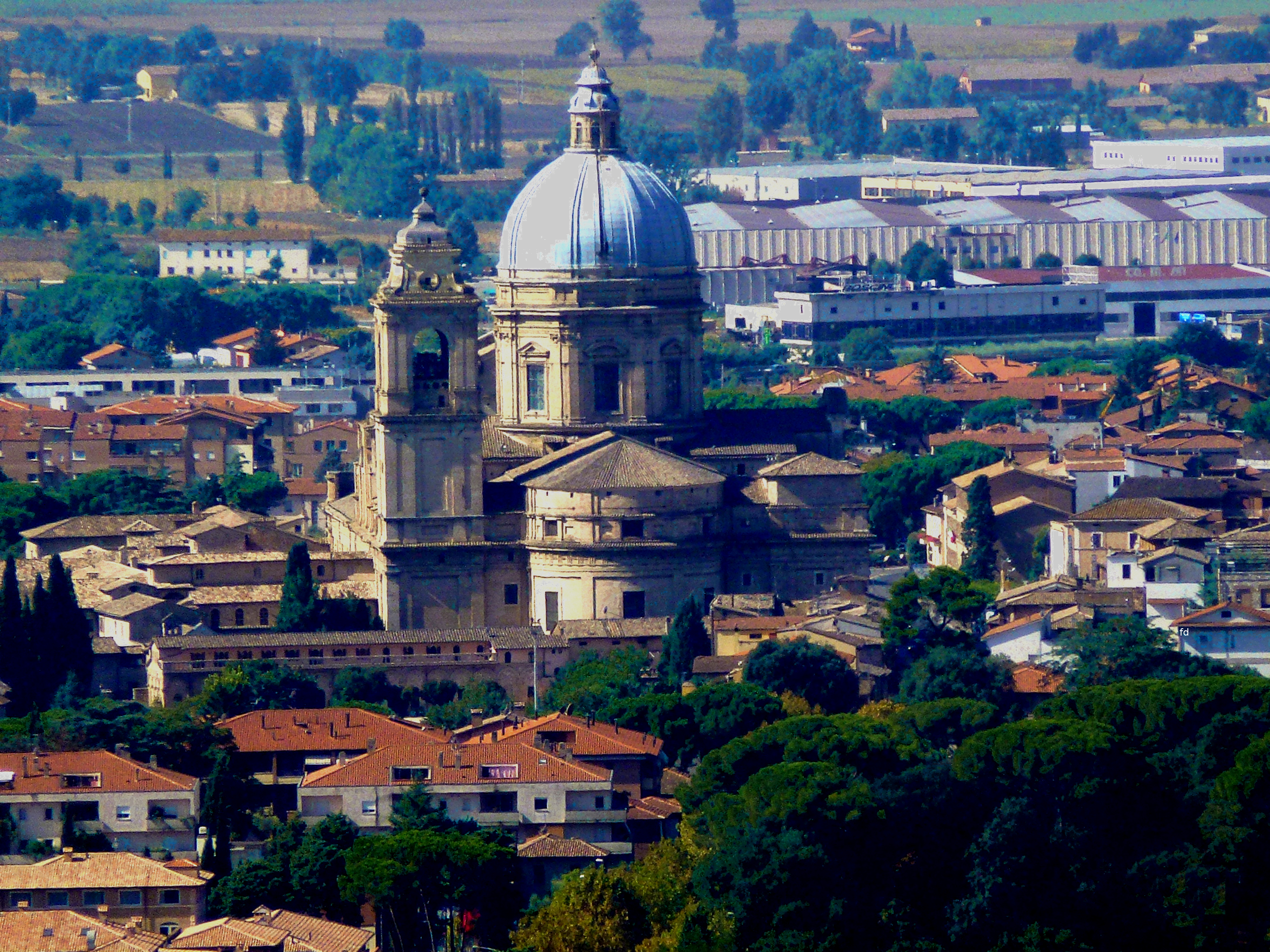
- Basilica of Santa Maria degli Angeli (St. Mary of the Angels); a large baroque church built to contain:
  - The Porziuncola, a chapel restored by St. Francis next to which was constructed the first convent of the Order of Friars Minor;
  - The Transito, chapel built in the cell where St. Francis died.
- The Palazzo del Capitano del Perdono, a historical structure associated with the tradition of the "Pardon of Assisi".

Together, these sites reflect the religious, artistic, and architectural legacy of the Franciscan movement and its influence throughout medieval and modern Europe.

=== Other landmarks ===
The town is dominated by two medieval castles. The larger, known as the Rocca Maggiore, was extensively rebuilt by Cardinal Albornoz in 1366, and later expanded by Popes Pius II—who added the polygonal tower in 1458—and Paul III, who built the cylindrical bastion near the entrance between 1535 and 1538.

The smaller castle, originally built during the Roman era, is only partially preserved. A small section and three towers remain and are open to the public.

Other sights include:

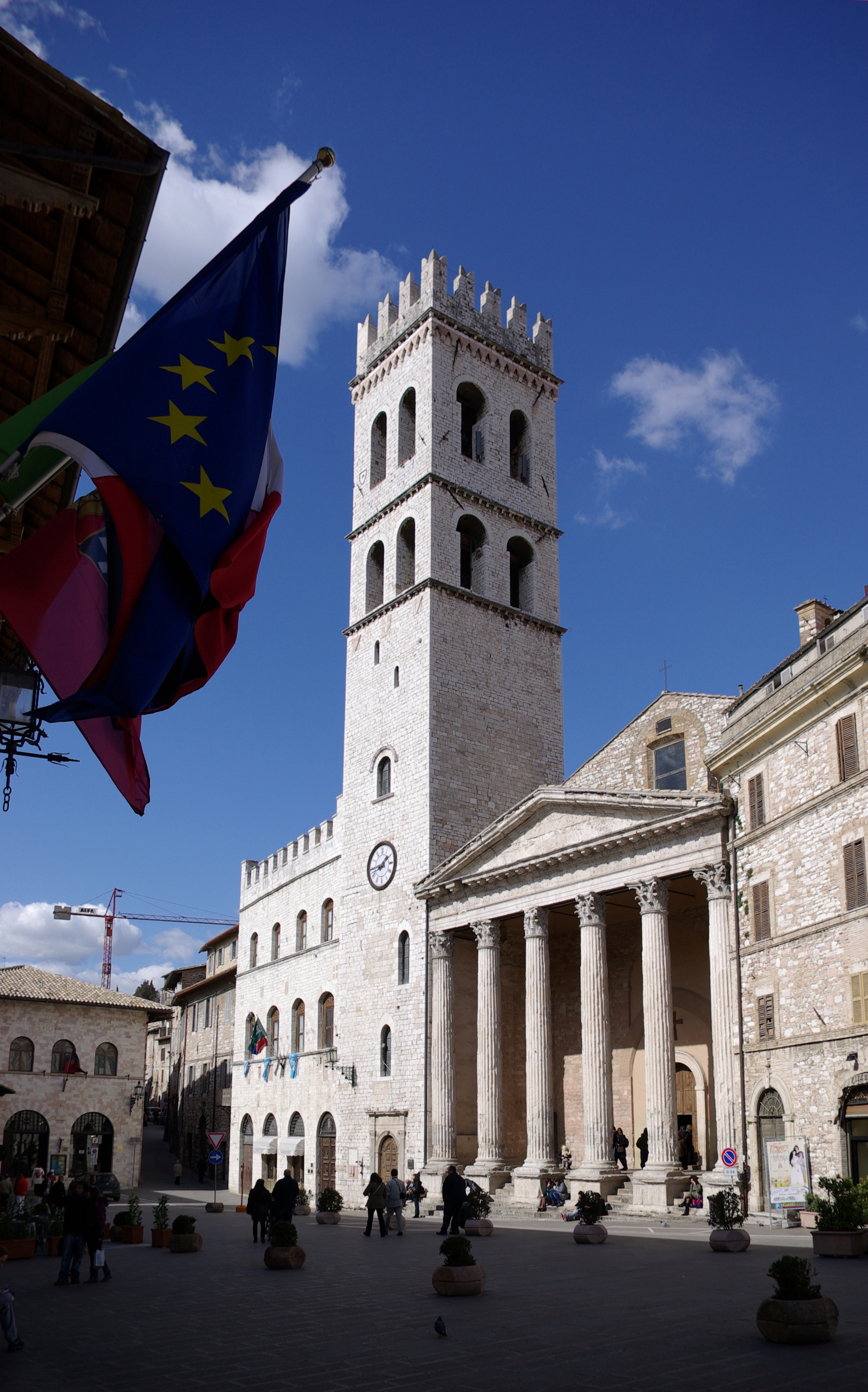
Temple of Minerva in the Piazza del Comune.

- The Roman amphitheater, built in the early 1st century AD. Its elliptical plan is still visible through the medieval houses constructed around it and through a surviving arch of travertine cunei. The former arena is now occupied by a garden.
- The Piazza del Comune ("Communal Square"), home to several notable buildings: the Palazzo del Capitano del Popolo (mid-13th century, featuring merlons added in 1927), the adjoining Torre del Popolo ("People's Tower", 1305), and the Palazzo dei Priori ("Palace of the Priors", 1275–1493). The fountain on the southern side, decorated with three lions, dates from the 16th century.
- The Temple of Minerva, a well-preserved Roman temple facing the Piazza del Comune.
- The crypt of the demolished church of San Nicolò di Piazza, also located on the Piazza del Comune, where St. Francis and Bernard of Quintavalle are said to have consulted the Gospels when forming the earliest Franciscan Rule.
- The Abbey of St. Benedict, founded in the 10th century on Monte Subasio. Remains include a late 11th-century crypt, the apse, and sections of the external walls.
- Chiesa Nuova: A church built over what is traditionally believed to be the parental home of St. Francis.
- The Piccolino Chapel: A small chapel marking the legendary birthplace of St. Francis.
- Church of San Pietro (St. Peter): Originally built by the Benedictines in the 10th century and rebuilt in the 13th century. The church features a rectangular façade with three rose windows, and a Gothic chapel of the Holy Sacrament that houses a triptych by Matteo di Gualdo.
- Santa Maria Maggiore (St. Mary the Greater): The earliest extant church in Assisi and formerly the cathedral of the city.
- Santo Stefano: One of the oldest churches in Assisi, notable for its simple and early Romanesque design.

=== Art ===
Assisi has had a rich tradition of art through the centuries and is now home to a number of well-known artistic works.

Artists Pietro Lorenzetti and Simone Martini worked shoulder to shoulder at Assisi. The Basilica of San Francesco d'Assisi includes a number of artistic works. Simone Martini's 1317 fresco there reflects the influence of Giotto in realism and the use of brilliant colours. Lorenzetti's fresco at the lower church of the Basilica includes a series of panels depicting the Crucifixion of Jesus, Deposition from the Cross, and Entombment of Christ. The figures Lorenzetti painted display emotions, yet the figures in these scenes are governed by geometric emotional interactions, unlike many prior depictions which appeared to be independent iconic aggregations. Lorenzetti's 1330 Madonna dei Tramonti also reflects the ongoing influence of Giotto on his Marian art, midway through his career.

== Culture ==
The Calendimaggio Festival takes place on the first four days of May ending on a Saturday. The festival is a re-enactment of medieval and Renaissance life in the form of a challenge between the upper faction (parte de sopra) with a blue flag and the lower faction of the town (parte de sotto) with a red flag. It includes processions, theatrical presentations, choirs, crossbow, flag-waving and dancing contests.

Assisi embroidery is a form of counted-thread embroidery which has been practised in Assisi since the 13th century.

Today many groups gather in Assisi for a variety of cultural and religious activities. One such group restored an 11th-century room and added altars to the world's religions. Other organizations, such as Assisi Performing Arts, host musical performances and other cultural events.

=== Saints ===
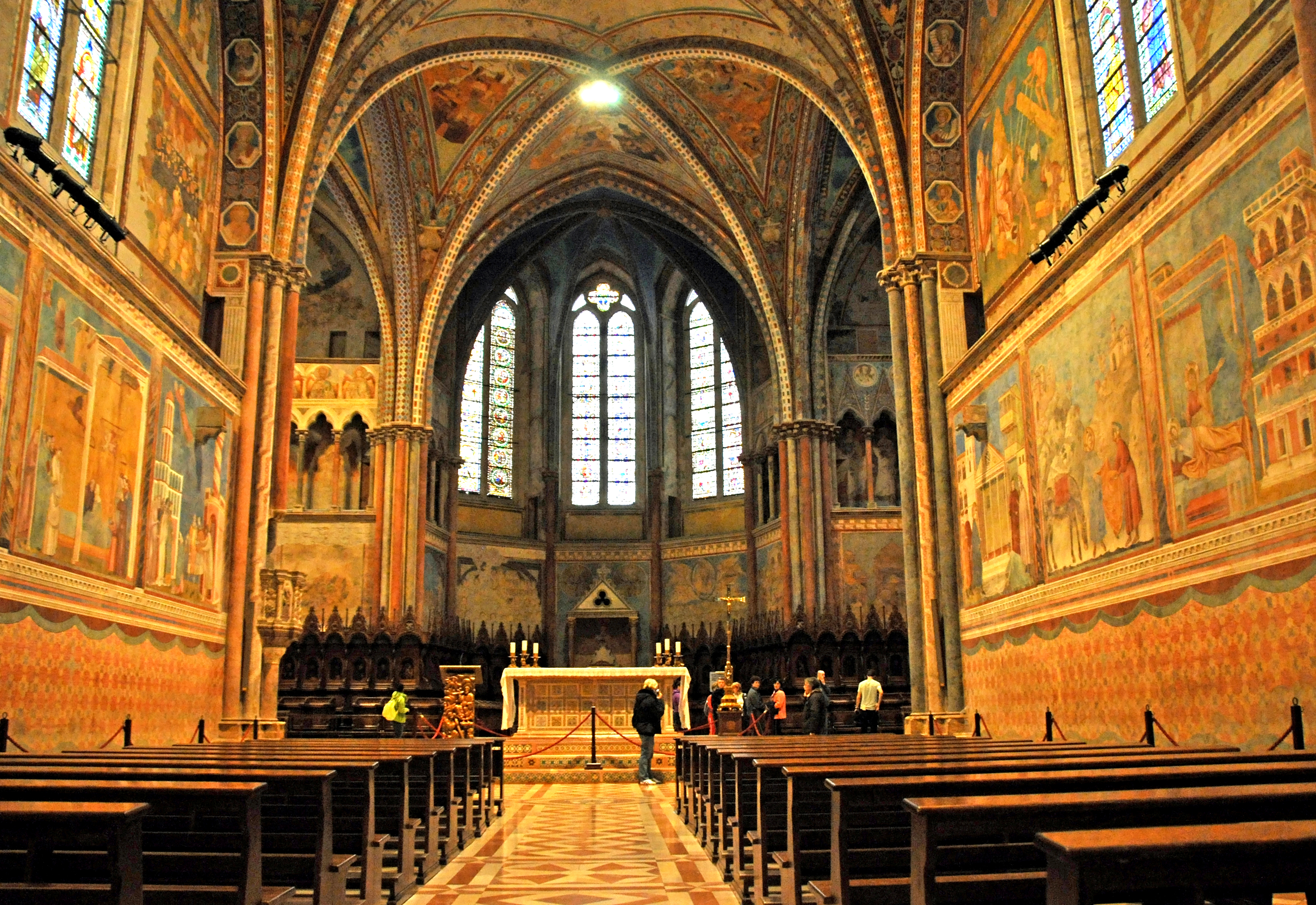
Upper Basilica decorated with Giotto's frescoes about the life of Saint Francis

Assisi was the home of several saints, including:

- Francis of Assisi
- Agnes of Assisi
- Clare of Assisi
- Gabriel of Our Lady of Sorrows
- Rufinus of Assisi
- Vitalis of Assisi
- Sylvester of Assisi

It is also the final resting place of Saint Carlo Acutis.

== Municipal government ==
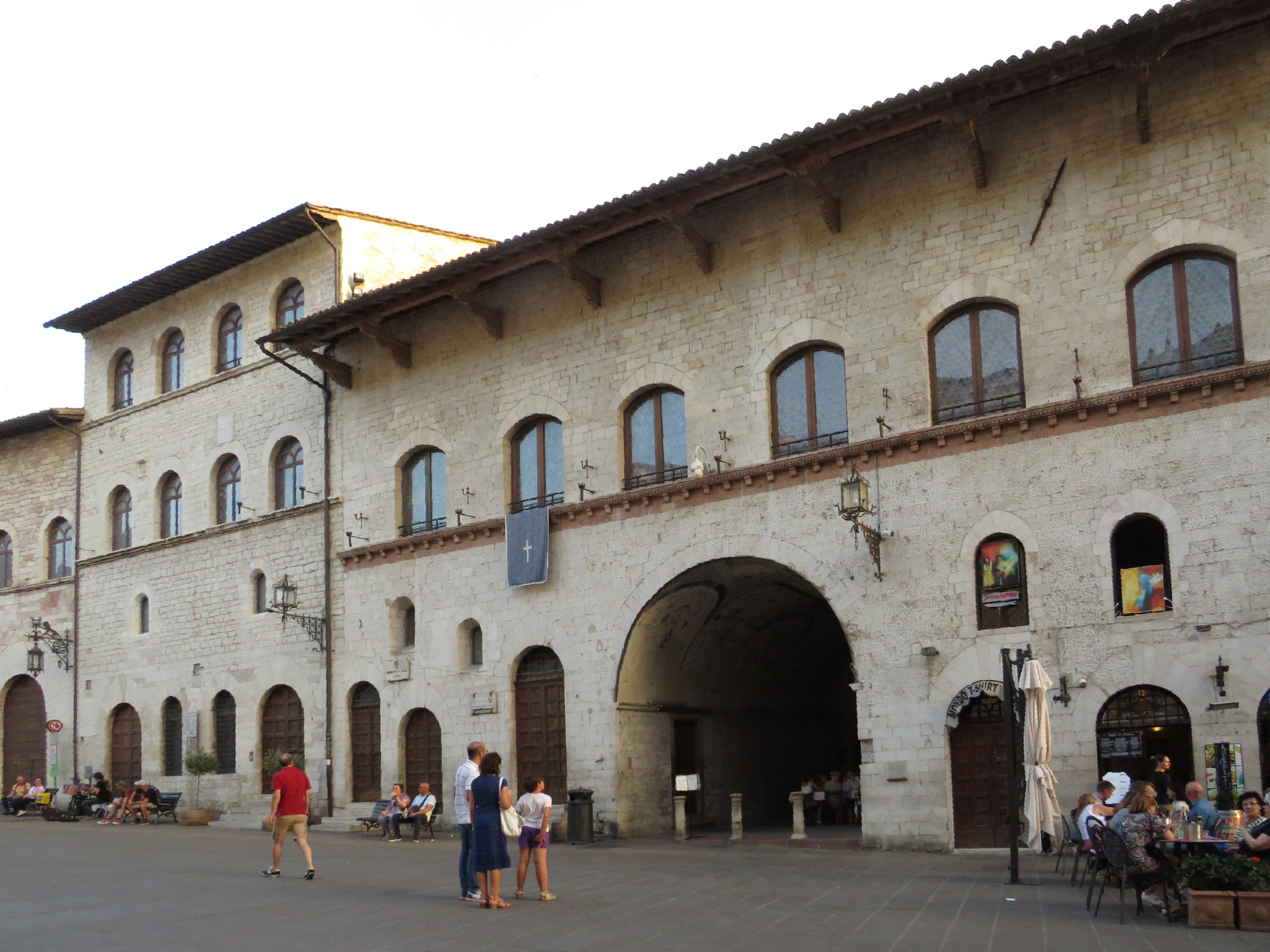
The Town Hall

Assisi is headed by a mayor (sindaco) assisted by a legislative body, the consiglio comunale, and an executive body, the giunta comunale. Since 1993 the mayor and members of the consiglio comunale are directly elected together by resident citizens, while from 1946 to 1993 the mayor was chosen by the legislative body. The giunta comunale is chaired by the mayor, who appoints others members, called assessori. The offices of the comune are housed in a building usually called the municipio or palazzo comunale.

Since 1993 the mayor of Assisi is directly elected by citizens, originally every four, then every five years. The current mayor is Valter Stoppini (PD), elected on 25–26 May 2025 with 51.6% of the votes.

Mayor	Term start	Term end	Party
Giuliano Vitali	29 June 1993	12 May 1997	PSD
Giorgio Bartolini	12 May 1997	20 February 2006	Ind
Special Prefectural Commissioner (20 February – 30 May 2006)
Claudio Ricci	30 May 2006	30 July 2015	FI
Antonio Lunghi (acting)	30 July 2015	21 June 2016	FI
Stefania Proietti	21 June 2016	30 December 2024	Ind
Valter Stoppini (acting)	30 December 2024	26 May 2025	Ind
Valter Stoppini	26 May 2025	Incumbent	PD

== Transport ==
Assisi railway station, opened in 1866, forms part of the Foligno–Terontola railway, which also links Florence with Rome. The station is located at Piazza Dante Alighieri, in the frazione of Santa Maria degli Angeli, about 5 km (3 mi) southwest of the city centre.

== International relations ==
=== Twin towns – sister cities ===
Assisi is twinned with:

- Bethlehem, Palestine
- San Francisco, United States
- Santiago de Compostela, Spain
- Wadowice, Poland

=== Others ===
The two papal basilicas sited in Assisi (the only ones not in Rome) gave their name to the two major cities in California: San Francisco and St. Mary of the Angels at the Porziuncula.

== Gallery ==
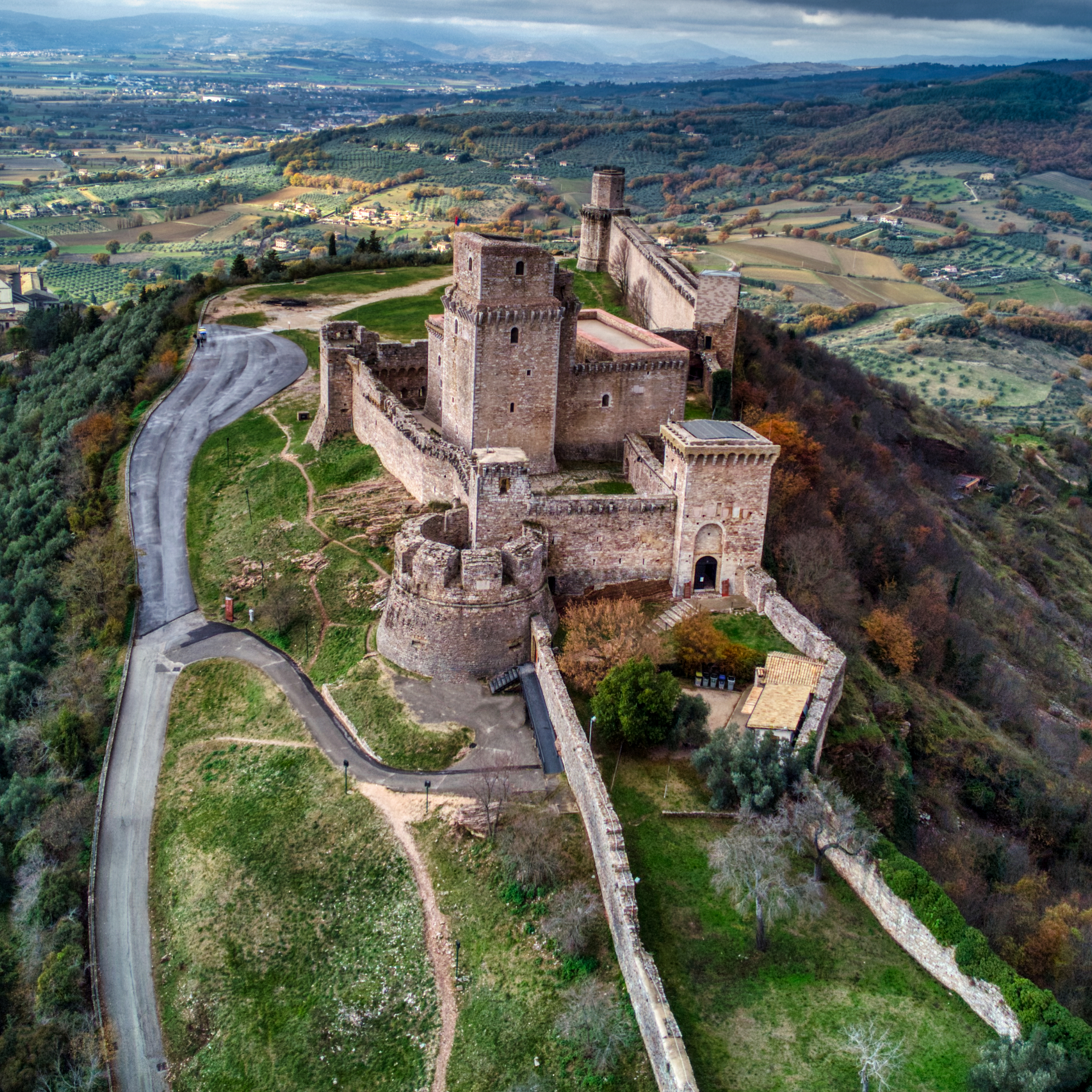
Rocca Maggiore

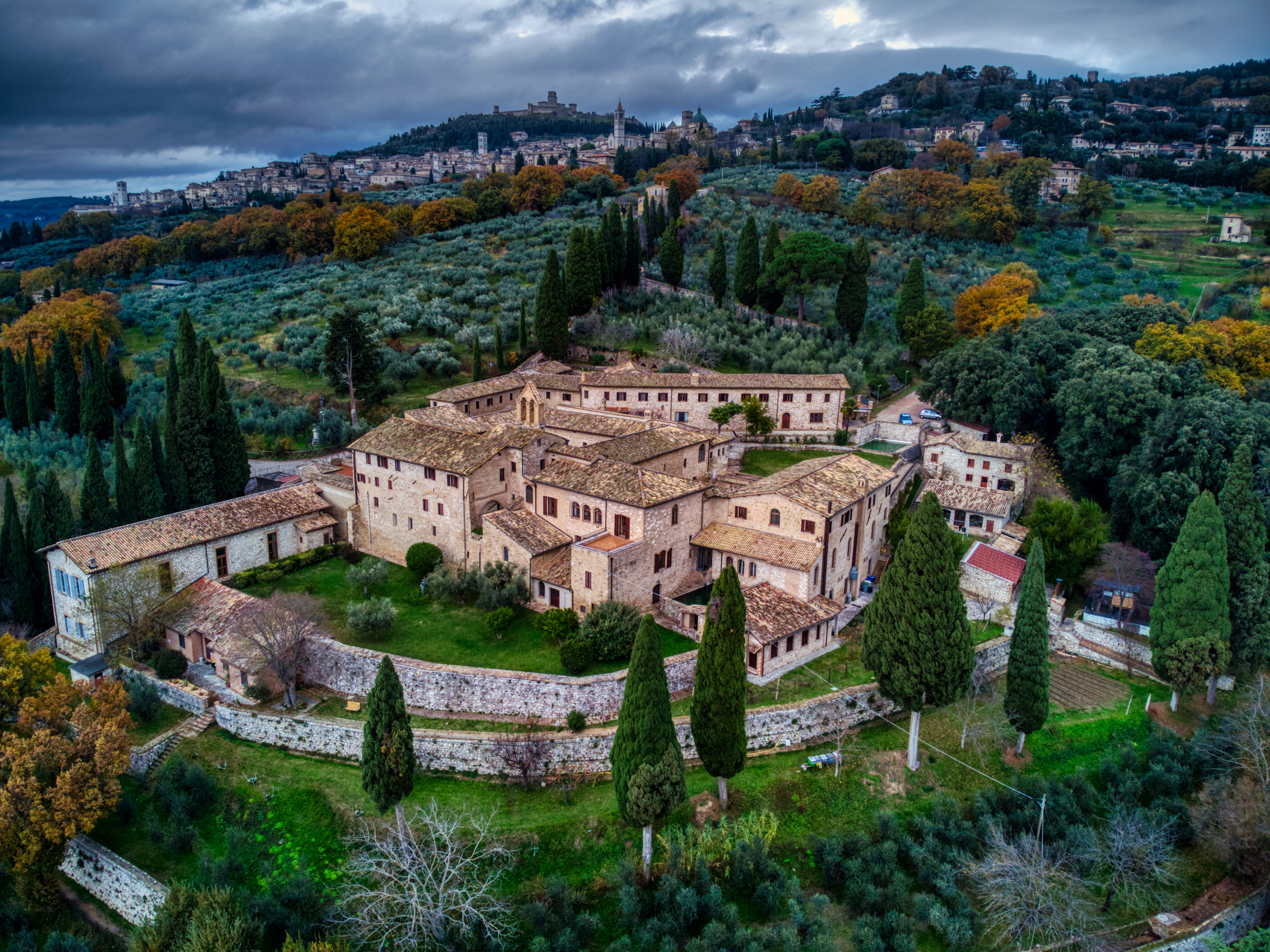
San Damiano complex

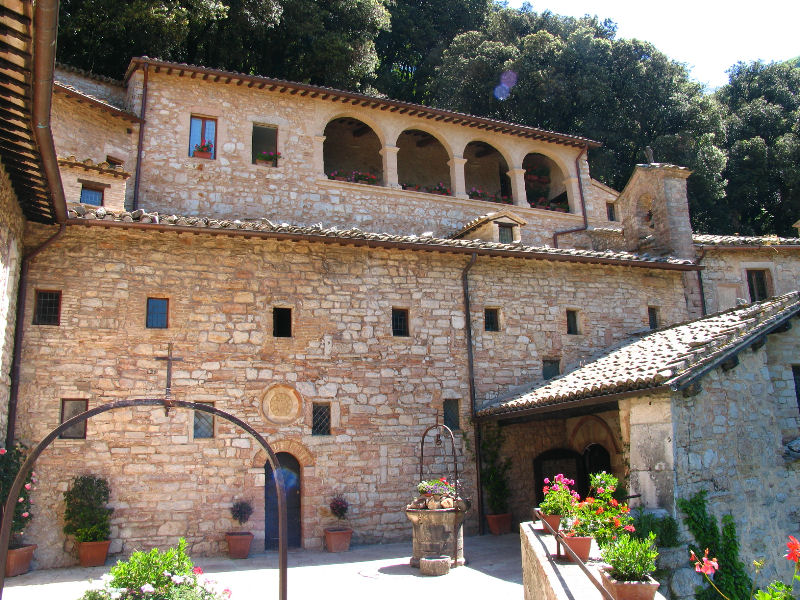
Eremo delle Carceri

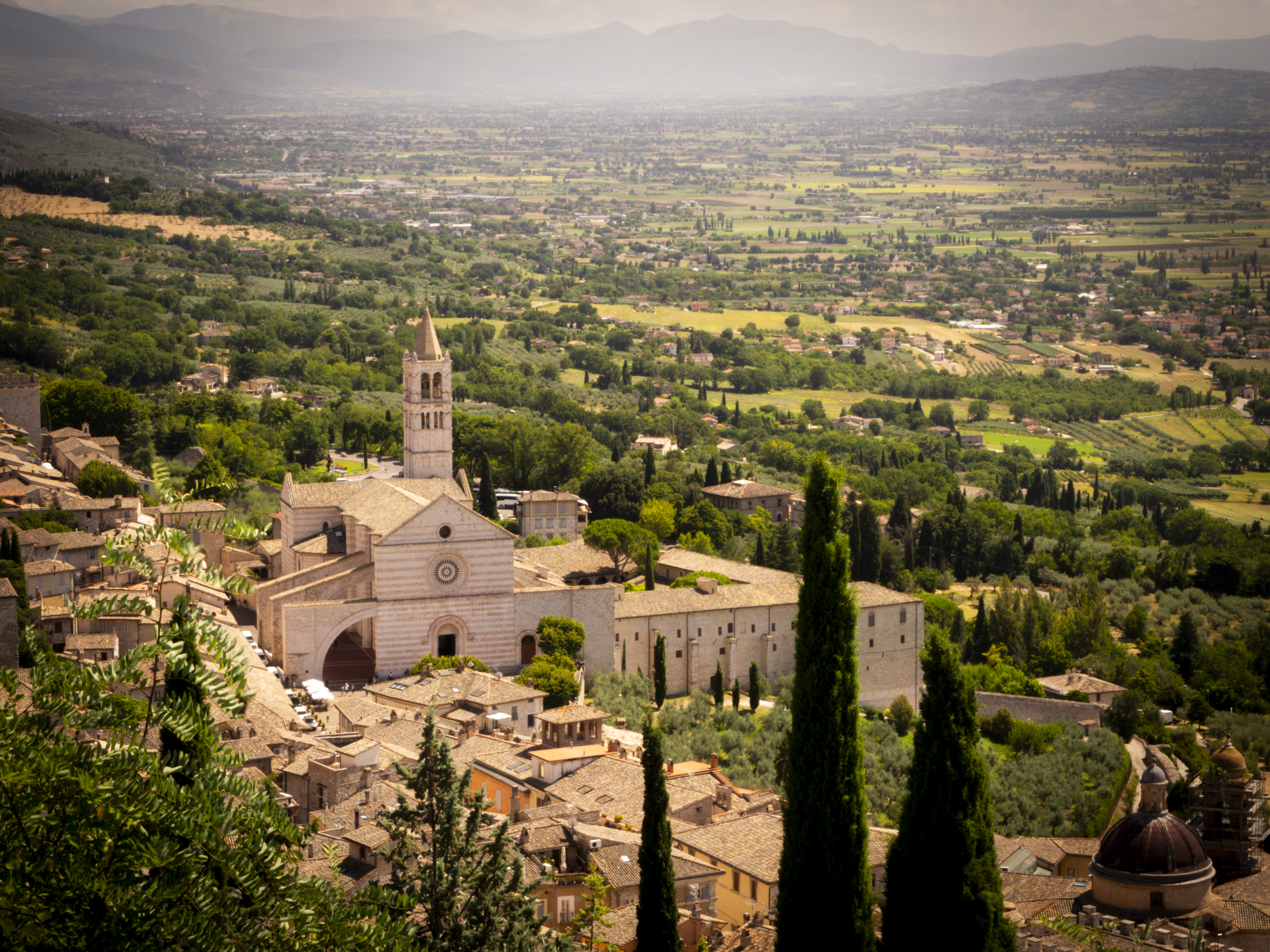
Santa Chiara Basilica

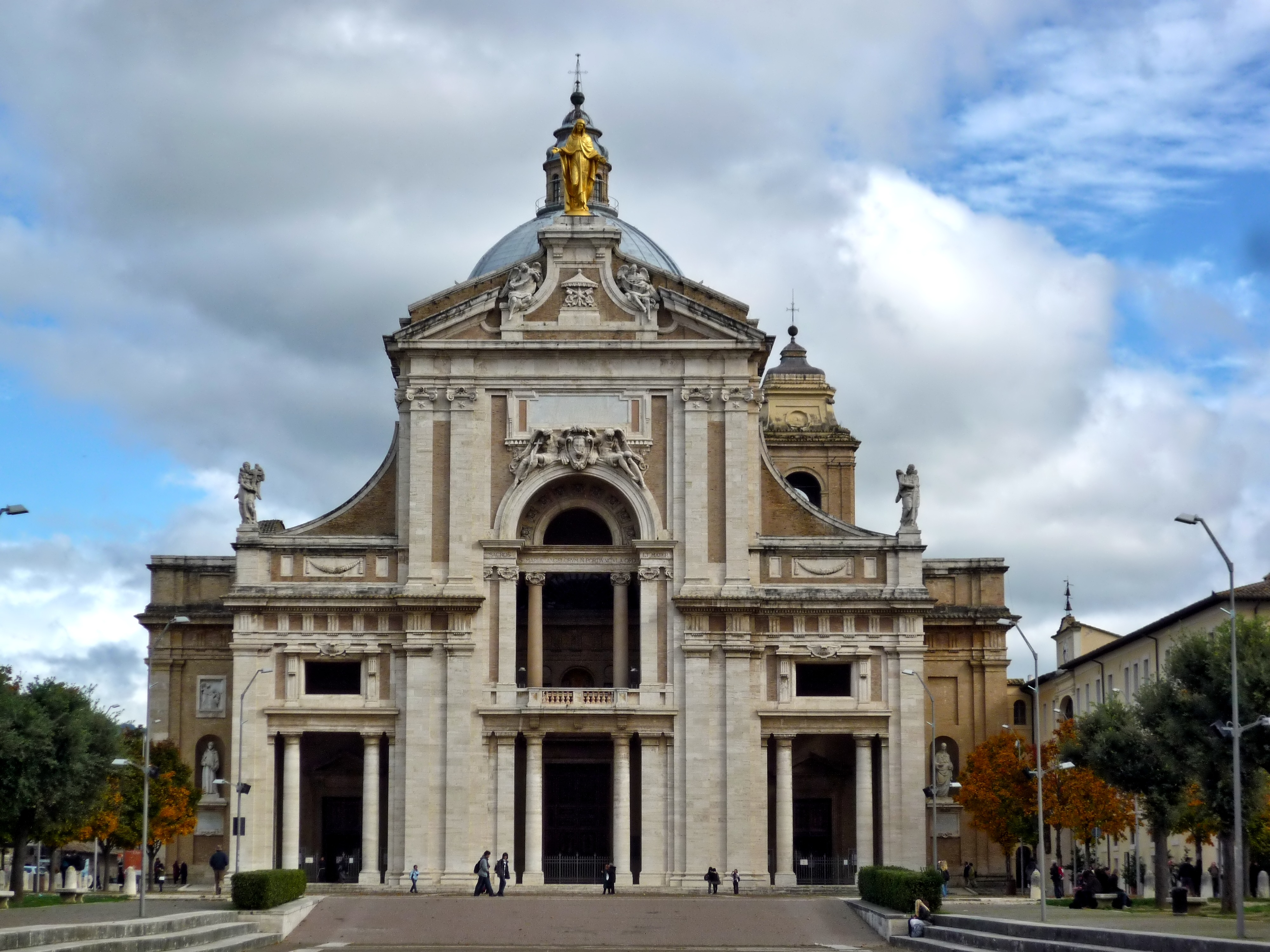
Santa Maria degli Angeli Basilica

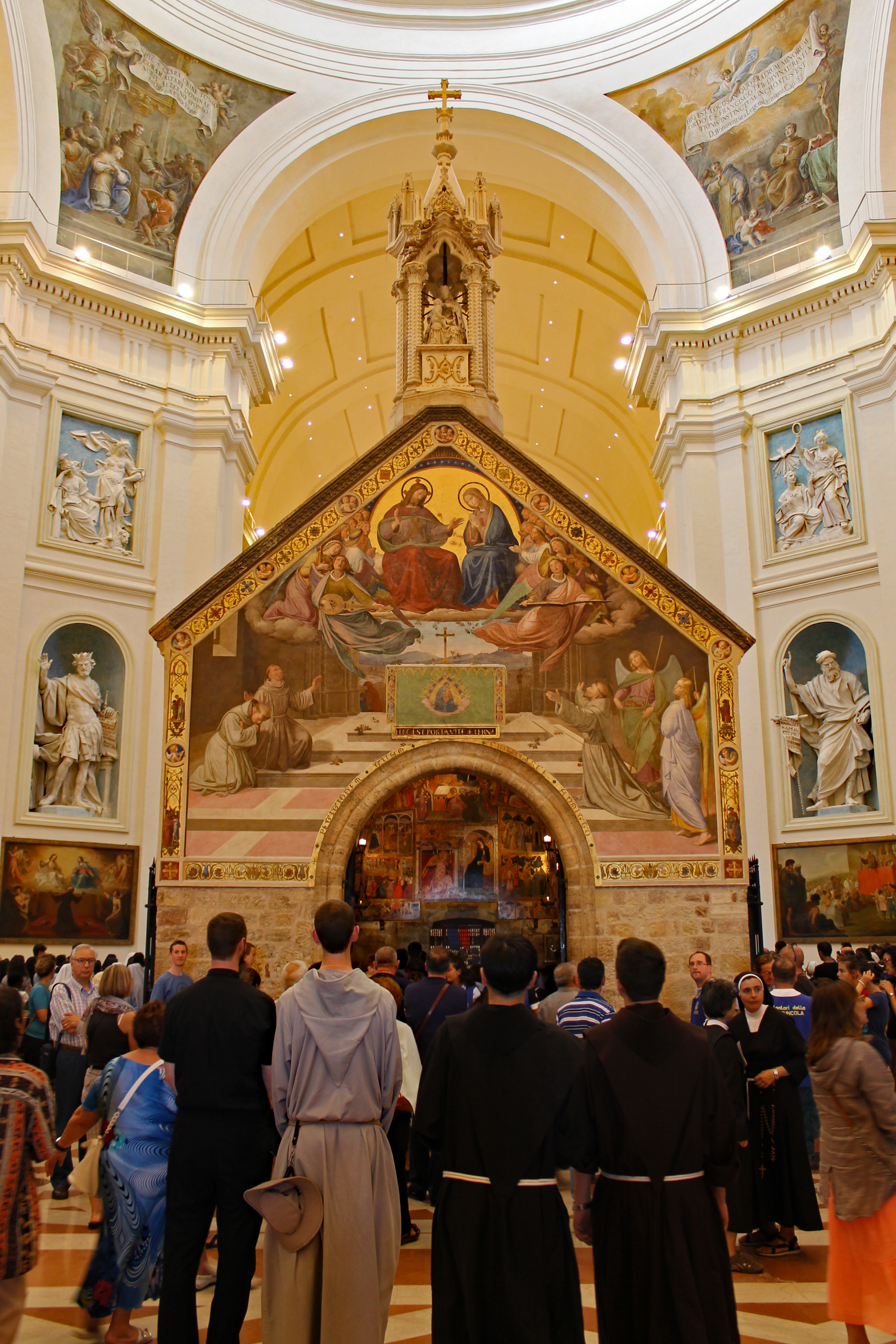
Portiuncula

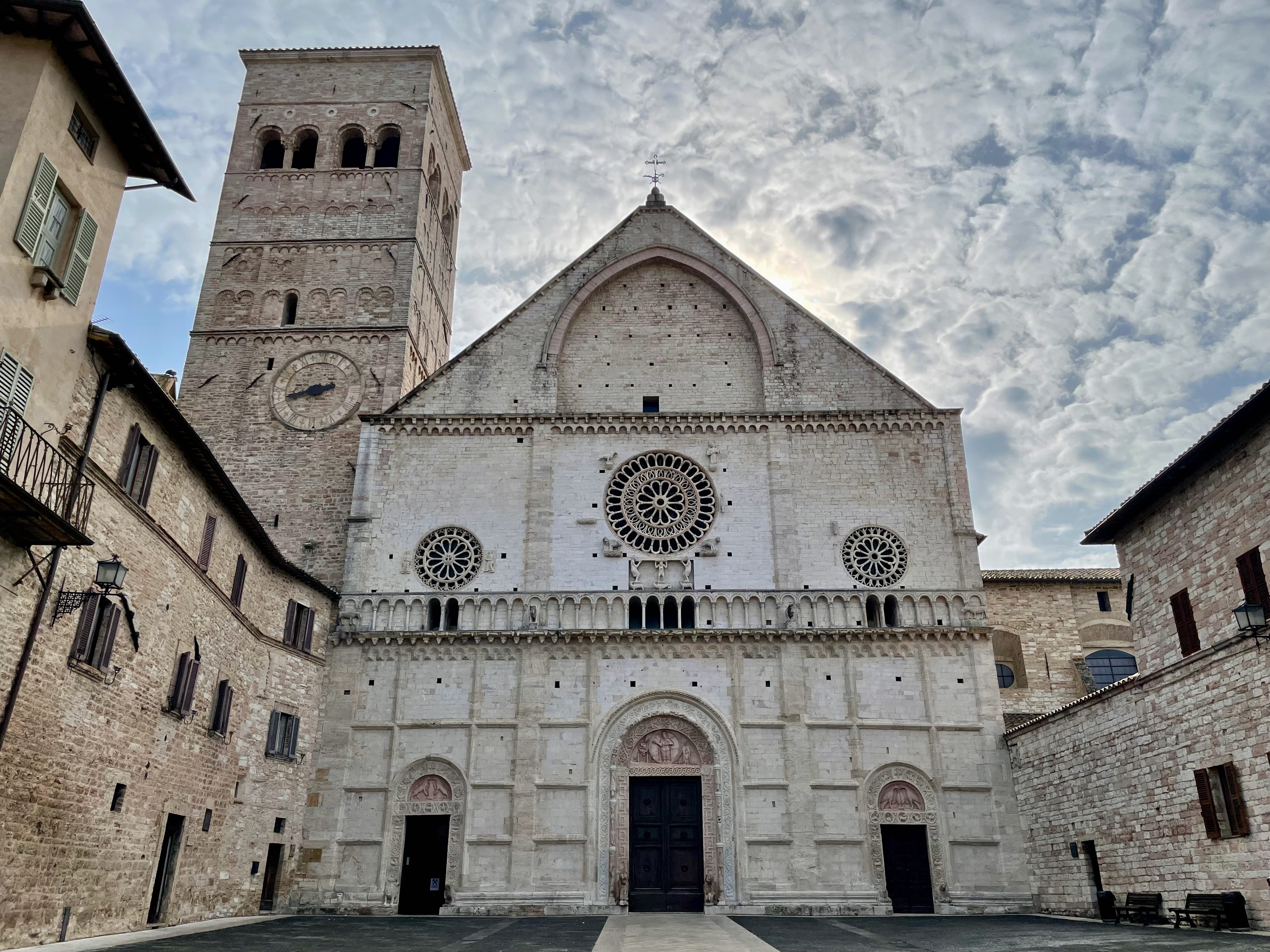
Assisi Cathedral

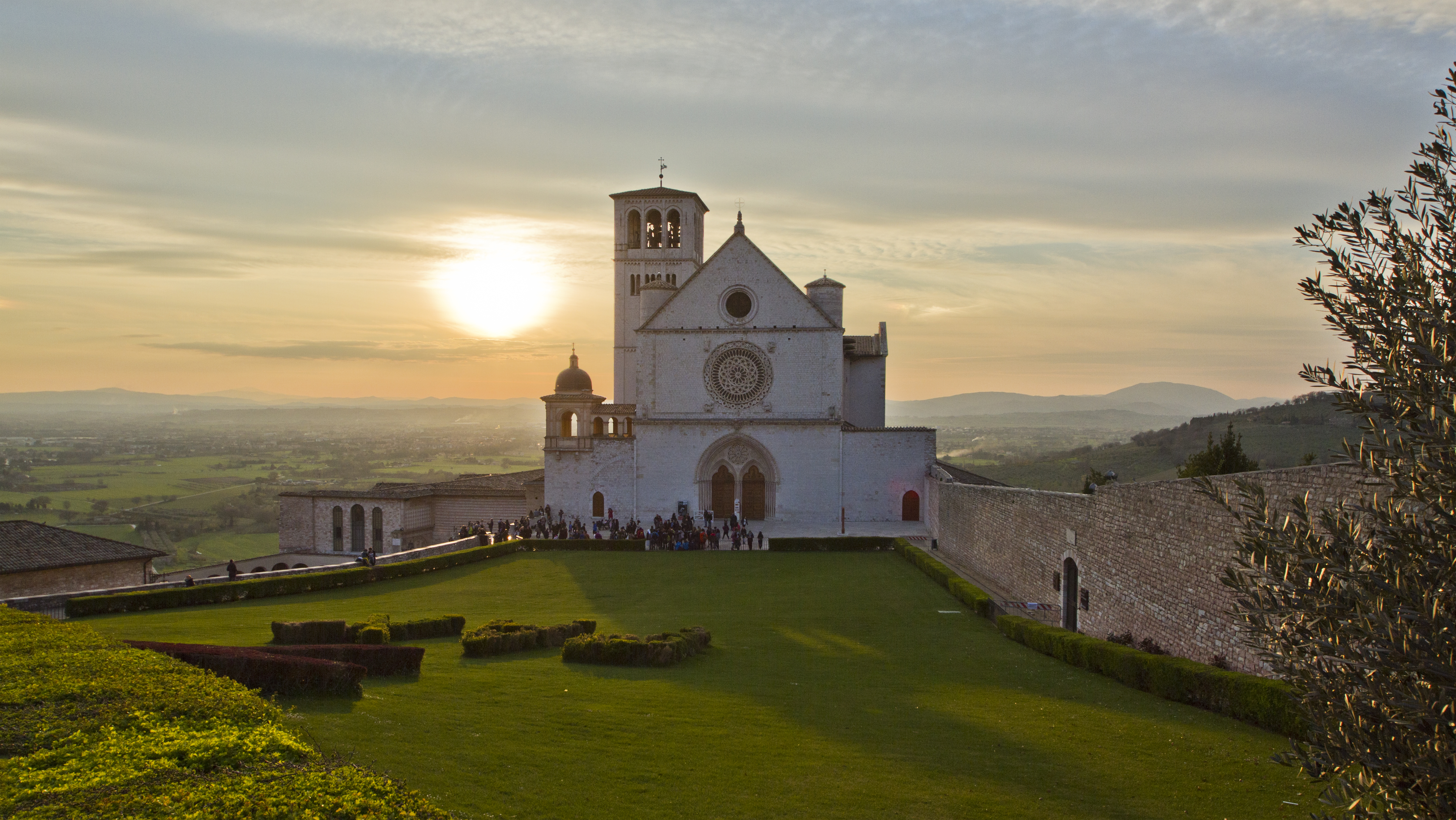
Upper San Francesco Basilica

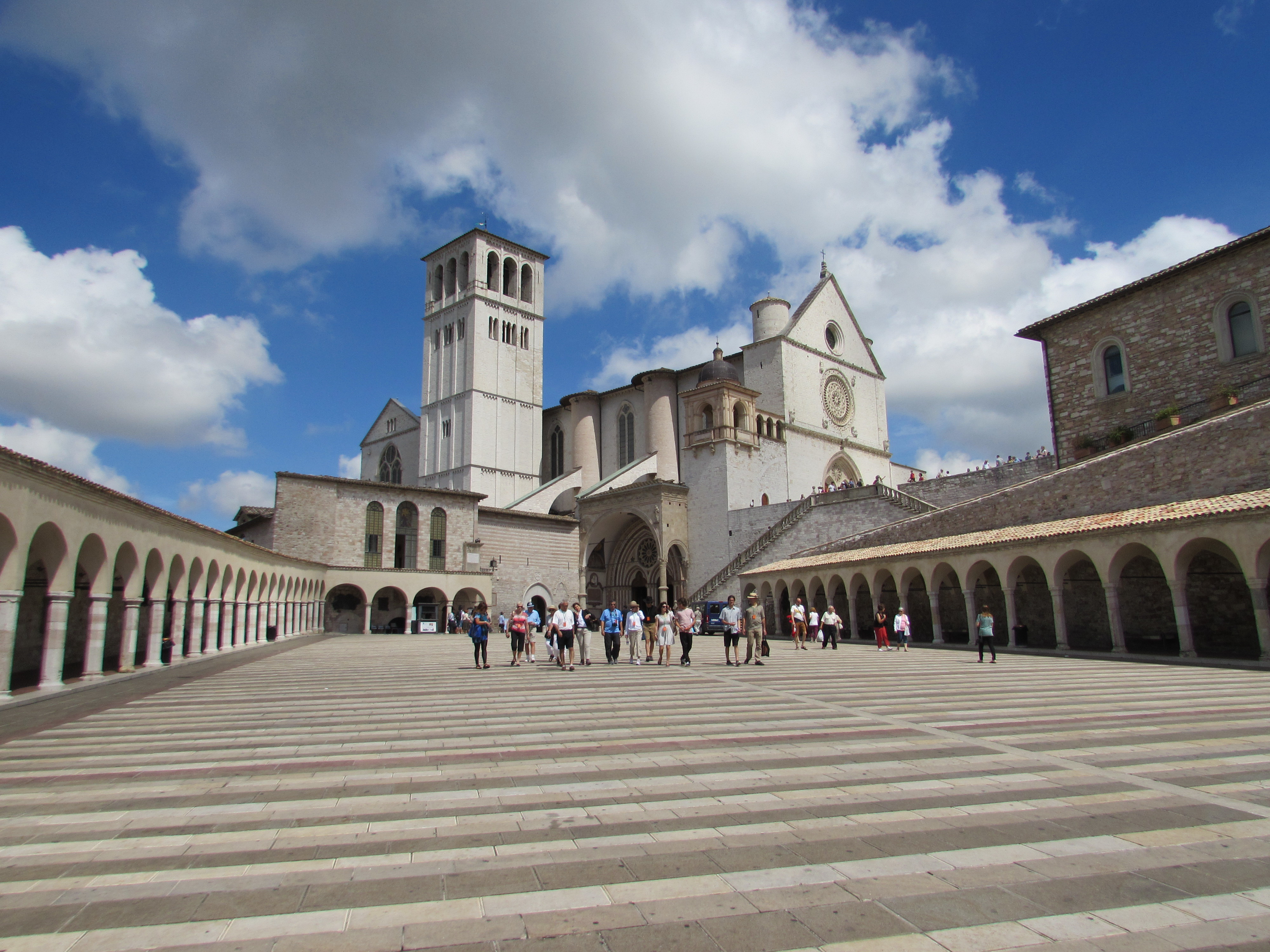
Piazza Inferiore

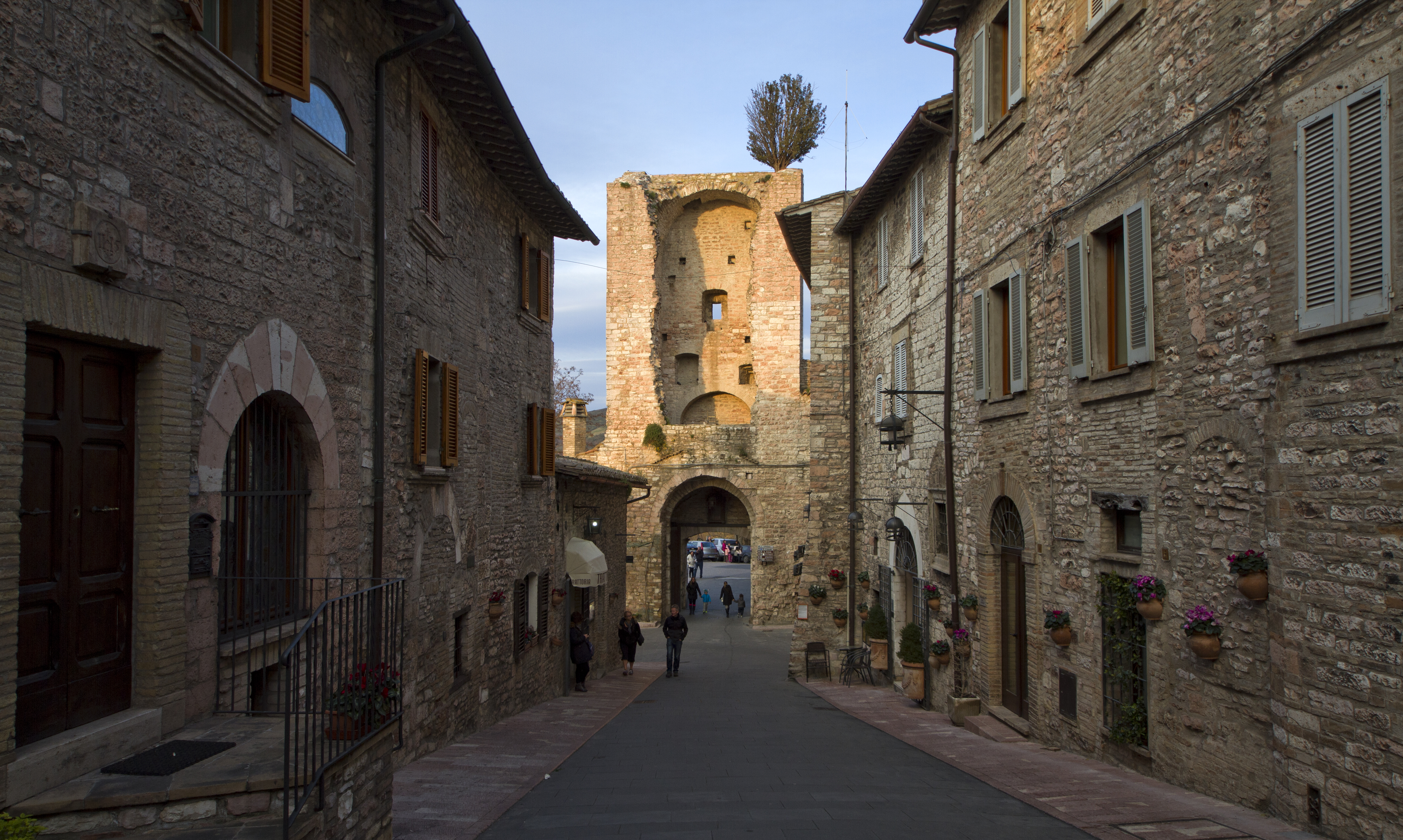
San Giacomo Gate
