= Passaggio di Assisi =

- Frazione
- Location within Italy
- Coordinates: 43°02′02″N 12°37′58″E
- Country: Italy
- Region: Umbria
- Province: Perugia
- Comune: Assisi
- Elevation: 209 m (686 ft)

Population (2001)
  - Total: 99
- Time zone: UTC+1 (CET)
  - Summer (DST): UTC+2 (CEST)
- Postcode: 06081
- Area code: 075

Passaggio di Assisi is a frazione of the comune of Assisi in the Province of Perugia, Umbria, central Italy. It stands at an elevation of 209 metres above sea level. At the time of the Istat census of 2001 it had 99 inhabitants.
