= Tordibetto =

- Frazione
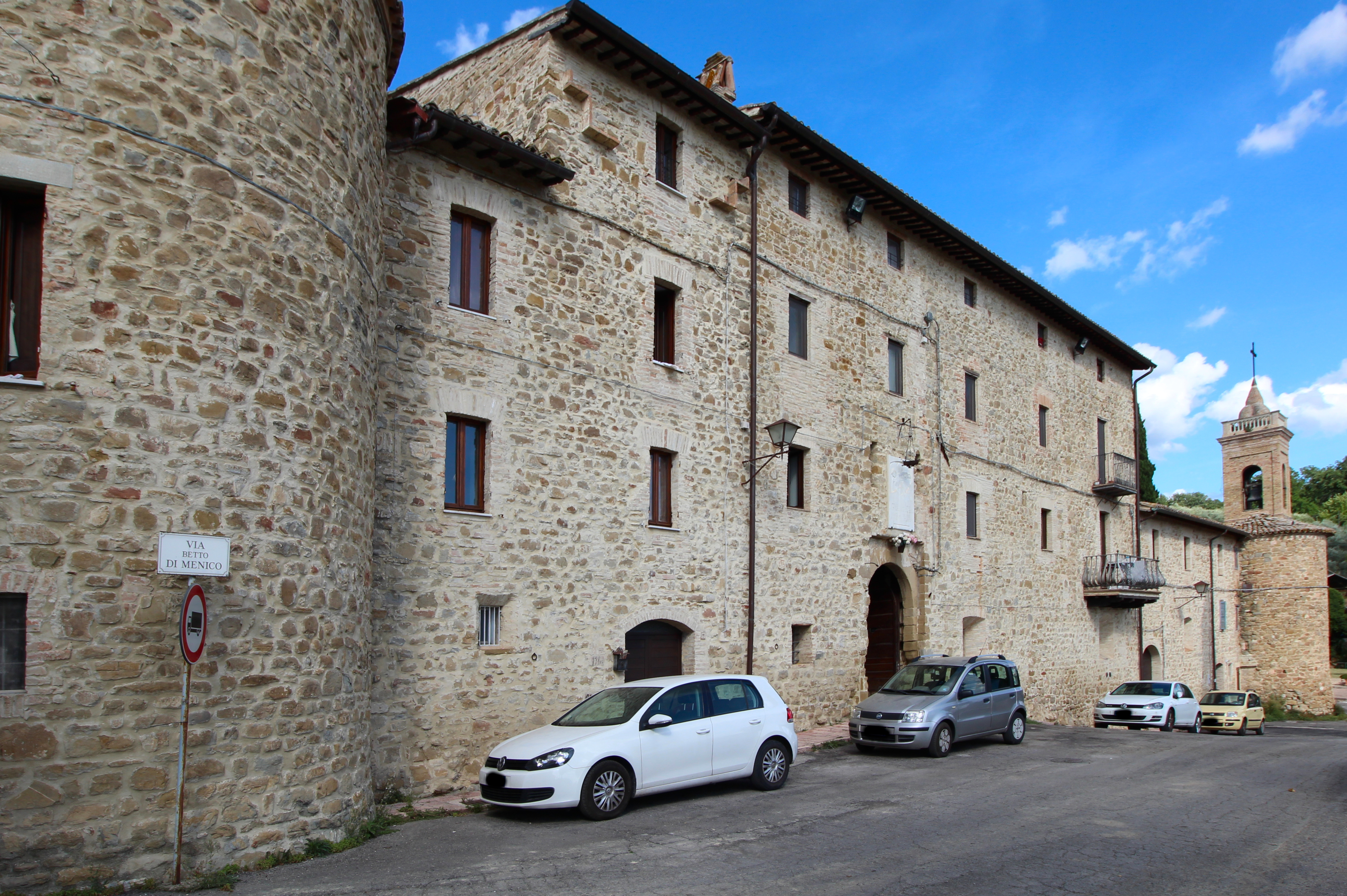
- Tordibetto

- Location within Italy
- Coordinates: 43°05′29″N 12°34′26″E
- Country: Italy
- Region: Umbria
- Province: Perugia
- Comune: Assisi
- Elevation: 255 m (837 ft)

Population (2001)
  - Total: 235
- Time zone: UTC+1 (CET)
  - Summer (DST): UTC+2 (CEST)
- Postcode: 06081
- Area code: 075

Tordibetto is a frazione of the comune of Assisi in the Province of Perugia, Umbria, central Italy. It stands at an elevation of 255 metres above sea level. At the time of the Istat census of 2001 it had 235 inhabitants.

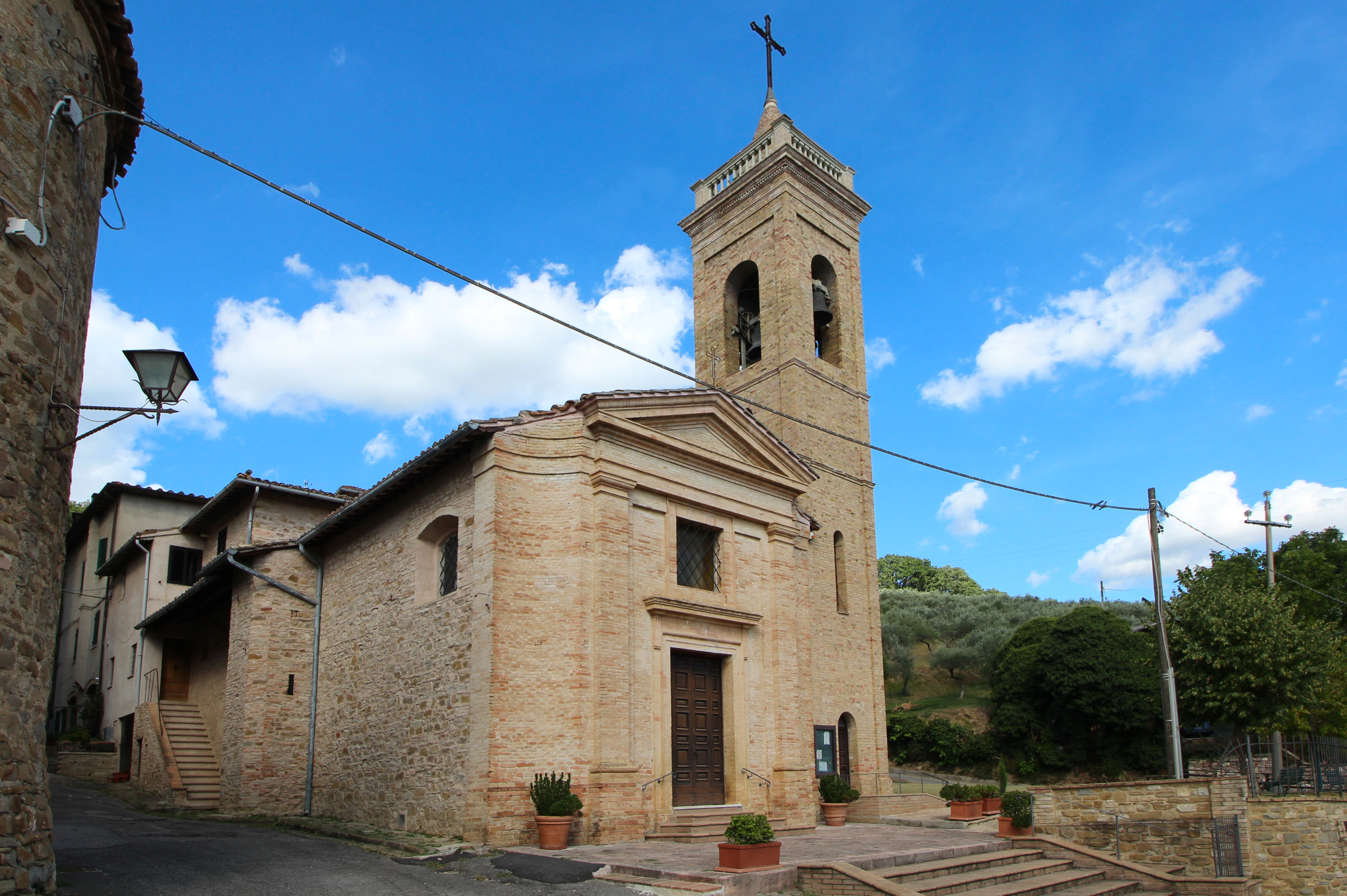
The church San Bernardino da Siena

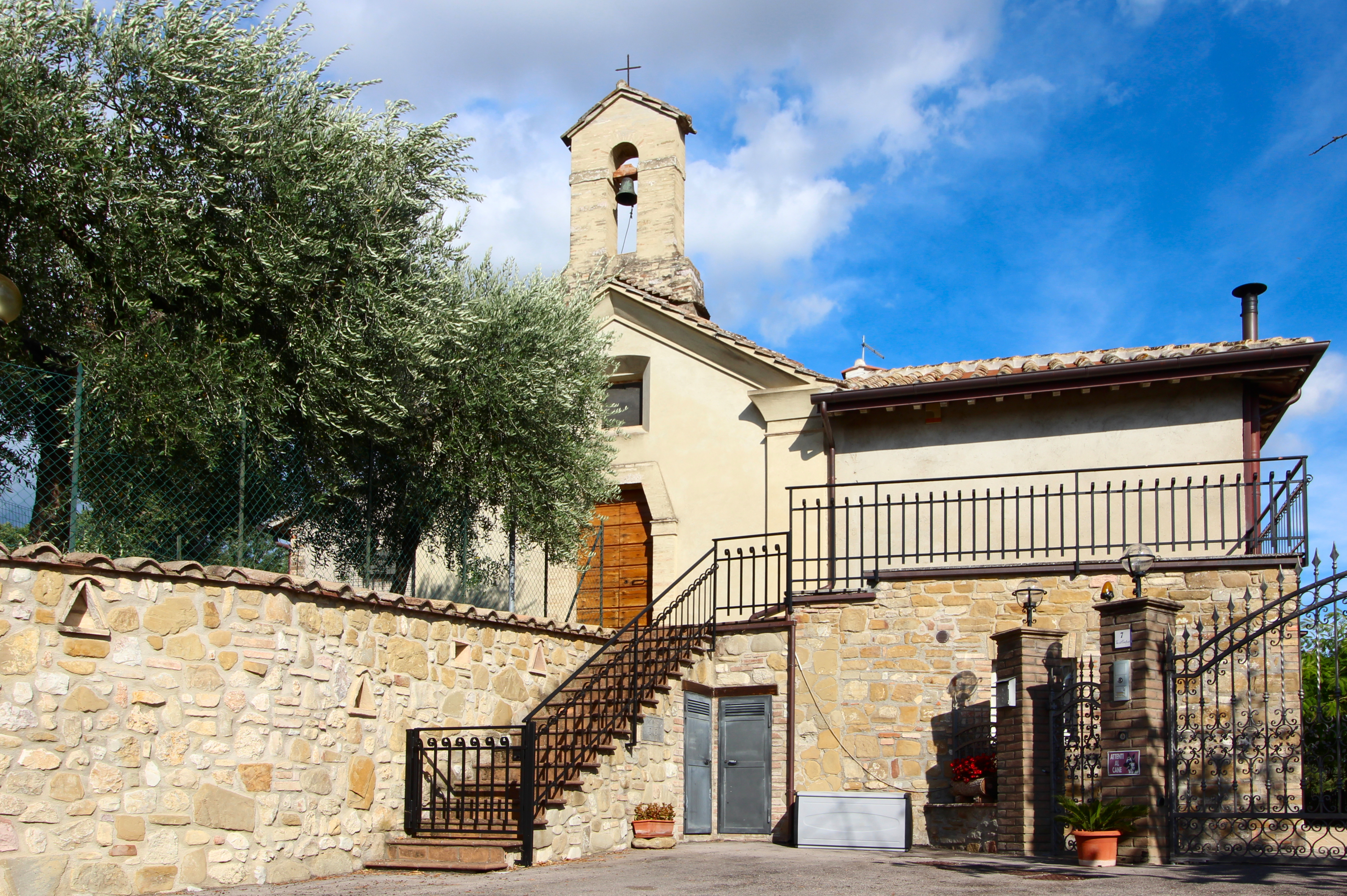
The church Santissimo Crocifisso
