= Sterpeto =

- Frazione
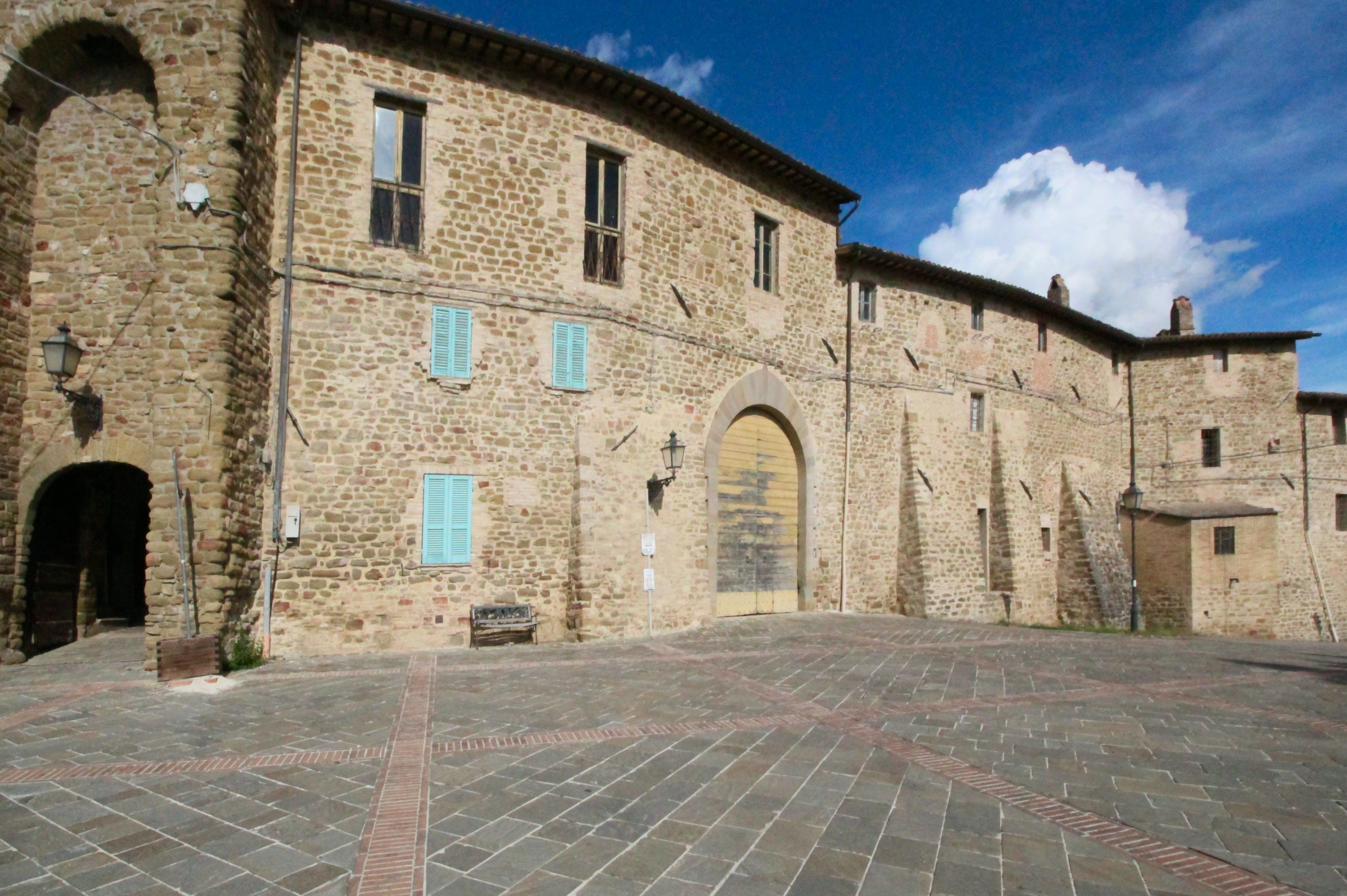
- Sterpeto

- Location within Italy
- Coordinates: 43°06′56″N 12°33′19″E
- Country: Italy
- Region: Umbria
- Province: Perugia
- Comune: Assisi
- Elevation: 344 m (1,129 ft)

Population (2001)
  - Total: 45
- Time zone: UTC+1 (CET)
  - Summer (DST): UTC+2 (CEST)
- Postcode: 06081
- Area code: 075

Sterpeto is a frazione of the comune of Assisi in the Province of Perugia, Umbria, central Italy. It stands at an elevation of 344 metres above sea level. At the time of the Istat census of 2001 it had 45 inhabitants,

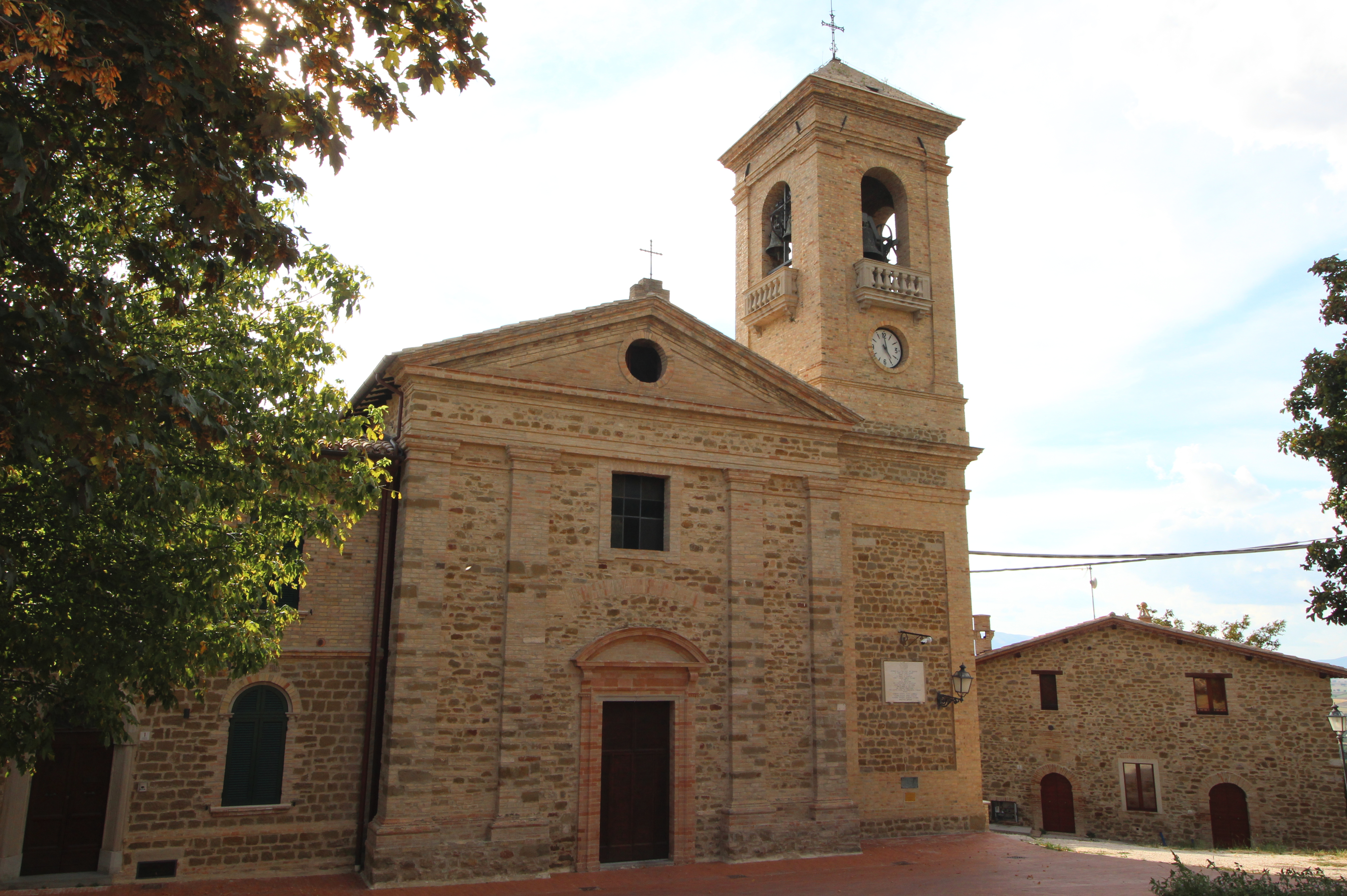
The church of Santa Maria Immacolata
