= Dalla Chiesa =

Dalla Chiesa is an Italian surname. Notable people with the surname include:

- Carlo Alberto dalla Chiesa (1920–1982), Italian military leader
- Nando dalla Chiesa (born 1949), Italian academic and politician, honorary president of Libera, former deputy and senator
- Rita dalla Chiesa (born 1947), Italian television host

== See also ==
- Chiesa (disambiguation)
