= Rocca Sant'Angelo =

- Frazione
- Location within Italy
- Coordinates: 43°07′40″N 12°33′31″E
- Country: Italy
- Region: Umbria
- Province: Perugia
- Comune: Assisi
- Elevation: 349 m (1,145 ft)

Population (2001)
  - Total: 27
- Time zone: UTC+1 (CET)
  - Summer (DST): UTC+2 (CEST)
- Postcode: 06081
- Area code: 075

Rocca Sant'Angelo is a frazione of the comune of Assisi in the Province of Perugia, Umbria, central Italy. It stands at an elevation of 349 metres above sea level. At the time of the Istat census of 2001 it had 27 inhabitants.
