= San Vitale, Assisi =

San Vitale
- Frazione
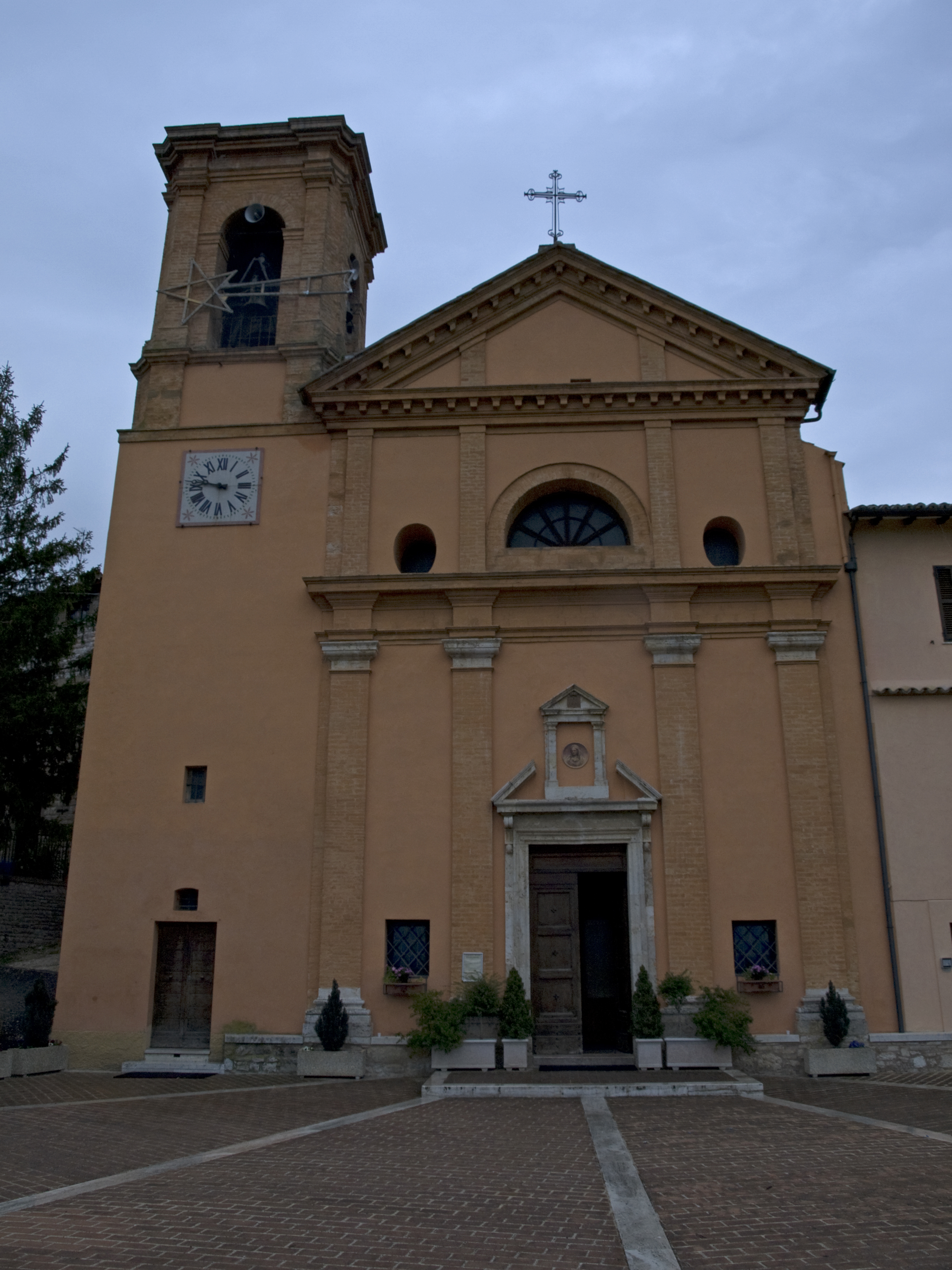
- San Vitale

- Location within Italy
- Coordinates: 43°02′51″N 12°38′14″E
- Country: Italy
- Region: Umbria
- Province: Perugia
- Comune: Assisi
- Elevation: 372 m (1,220 ft)

Population (2001)
  - Total: 494
- Time zone: UTC+1 (CET)
  - Summer (DST): UTC+2 (CEST)
- Postcode: 06081
- Area code: 075

San Vitale is a frazione of the comune of Assisi in the Province of Perugia, Umbria, central Italy. It stands at an elevation of 372 metres above sea level. At the time of the Istat census of 2001 it had 494 inhabitants,
