= Chiesa Nuova =

Chiesa Nuova (Italian for "New Church") may refer to:

- Chiesa Nuova, Rome or Santa Maria in Vallicella, a church in Rome, Italy
- Chiesa Nuova (Rome Metro), a railway station
- Chiesa Nuova, Assisi, a church in Assisi, Italy

== See also ==
- Chiesanuova (disambiguation)
