= San Gregorio, Assisi =

San Gregorio
- Frazione
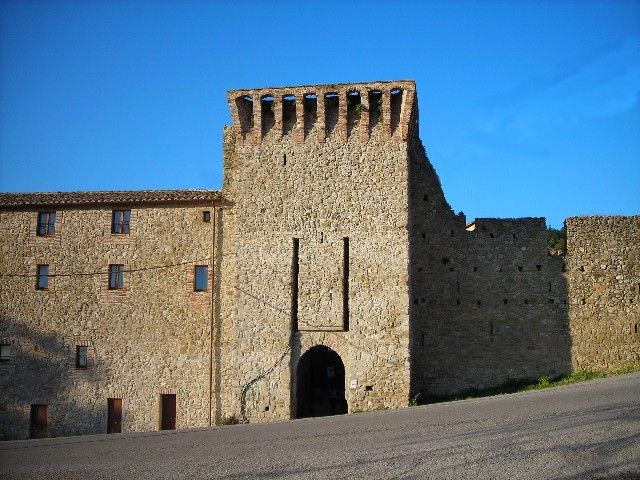
- San Gregorio

- Location within Italy
- Coordinates: 43°08′17″N 12°33′00″E
- Country: Italy
- Region: Umbria
- Province: Perugia
- Comune: Assisi
- Elevation: 279 m (915 ft)

Population (2001)
  - Total: 13
- Time zone: UTC+1 (CET)
  - Summer (DST): UTC+2 (CEST)
- Postcode: 06081
- Area code: 075

San Gregorio is a frazione of the comune of Assisi in the Province of Perugia, Umbria, central Italy. It stands at an elevation of 279 metres above sea level. At the time of the Istat census of 2001 it had 13 inhabitants.
