= San Presto =

- Frazione
- Location within Italy
- Coordinates: 43°08′05″N 12°40′30″E
- Country: Italy
- Region: Umbria
- Province: Perugia
- Comune: Assisi
- Elevation: 672 m (2,205 ft)

Population (2001)
  - Total: 15
- Time zone: UTC+1 (CET)
  - Summer (DST): UTC+2 (CEST)
- Postcode: 06081
- Area code: 075

San Presto is a frazione of the comune of Assisi in the Province of Perugia, Umbria, central Italy. It stands at an elevation of 672 metres above sea level. At the time of the Istat census of 2001 it had 15 inhabitants,
