= Chiesanuova (disambiguation) =

Chiesanuova may refer to:

- Chiesanuova, a minor municipality of San Marino
- Chiesanuova, Piedmont, a comune in the Metropolitan City of Turin in the Italian region Piedmont,
- Chiesanuova, populated place in Sannicola, Italy
- Chiesanuova, populated place in Brescia, Italy
- Chiesanuova, populated place in San Donà di Piave, Italy
- Chiesanuova, populated place Chiesina Uzzanese, Italy
- Chiesanuova, populated place in Valderice, Italy
- Chiesanuova, populated place in Treia, Italy

== See also ==
- Chiesa Nuova (disambiguation)
