= Pieve San Nicolò =

- Frazione
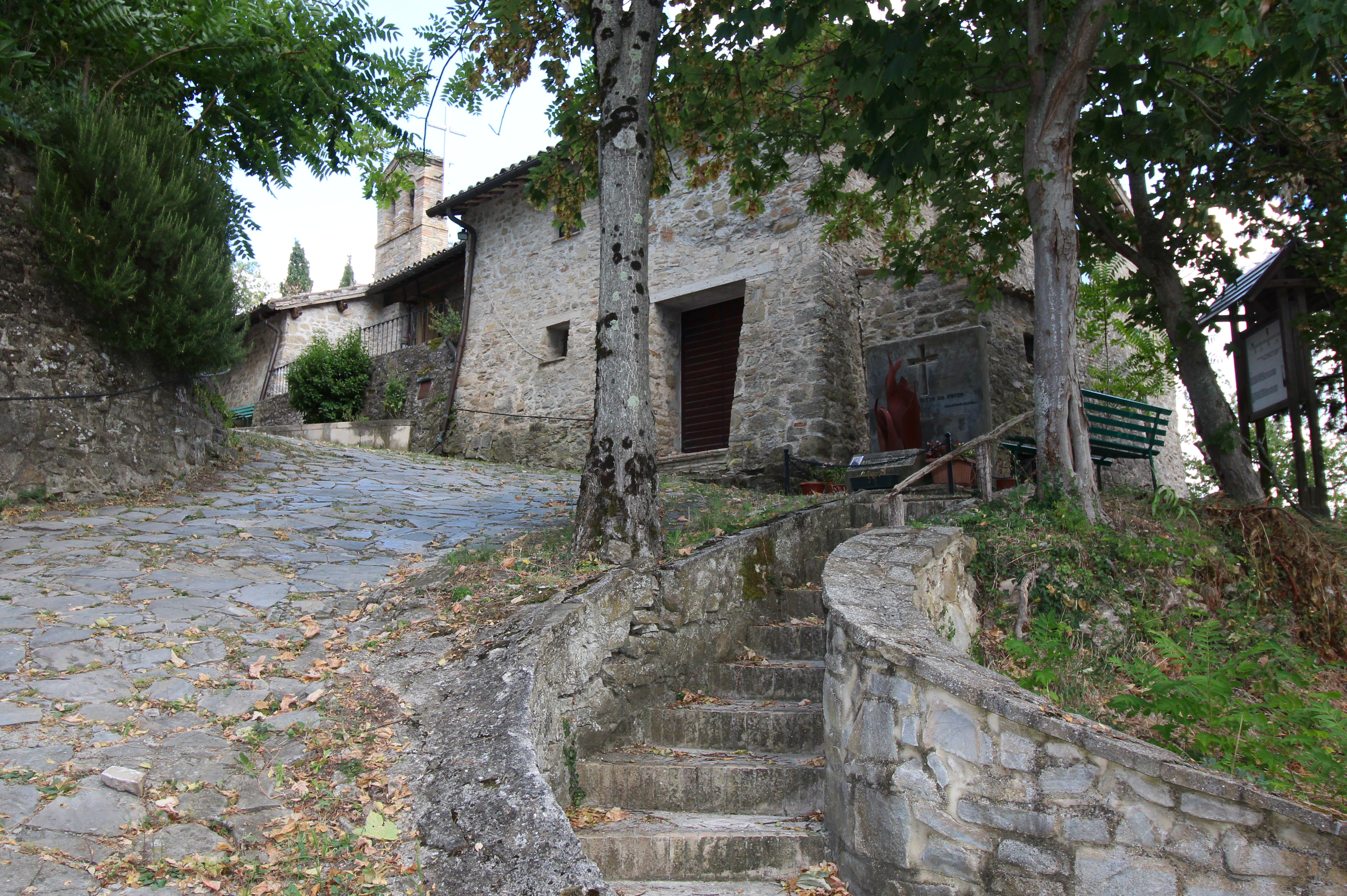
- Pieve San Nicolò

- Location within Italy
- Coordinates: 43°07′53″N 12°37′08″E
- Country: Italy
- Region: Umbria
- Province: Perugia
- Comune: Assisi
- Elevation: 603 m (1,978 ft)

Population (2001)
  - Total: 26
- Time zone: UTC+1 (CET)
  - Summer (DST): UTC+2 (CEST)
- Postcode: 06081
- Area code: 075

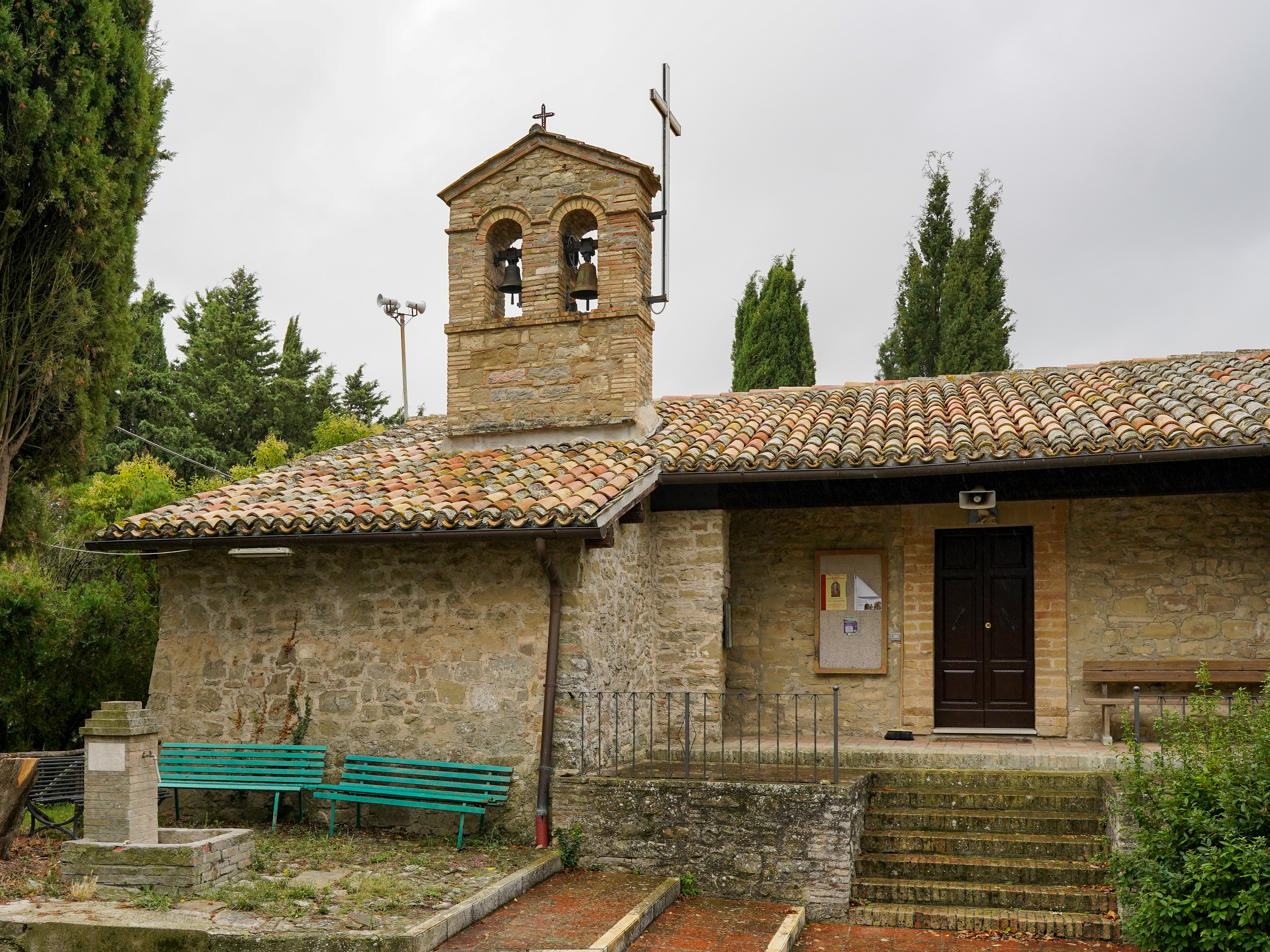
Church of San Nicolò

Pieve San Nicolò is a frazione of the comune of Assisi in the Province of Perugia, Umbria, central Italy. It stands at an elevation of 603 m (1,978 ft) above sea level. At the time of the Istat census of 2001 it had 26 inhabitants.
