= Palazzo, Assisi =

Palazzo
- Frazione
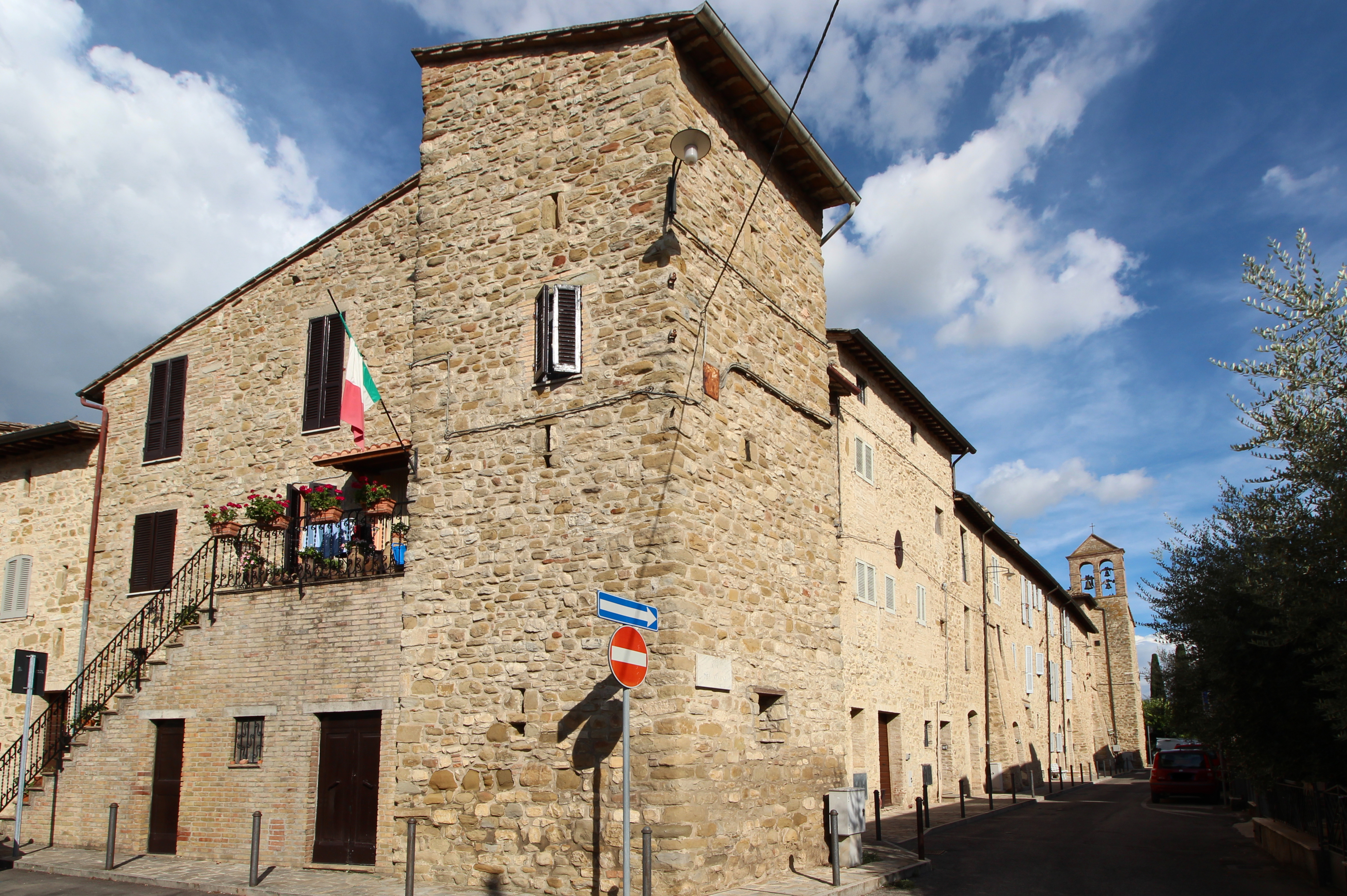
- Palazzo

- Location within Italy
- Coordinates: 43°06′01″N 12°34′00″E
- Country: Italy
- Region: Umbria
- Province: Perugia
- Comune: Assisi
- Elevation: 236 m (774 ft)

Population (2001)
  - Total: 1,343
- Time zone: UTC+1 (CET)
  - Summer (DST): UTC+2 (CEST)
- Postcode: 06081
- Area code: 075

Palazzo is a frazione of the comune of Assisi in the Province of Perugia, Umbria, central Italy. It stands at an elevation of 236 metres above sea level. At the time of the Istat census of 2001 it had 1343 inhabitants.

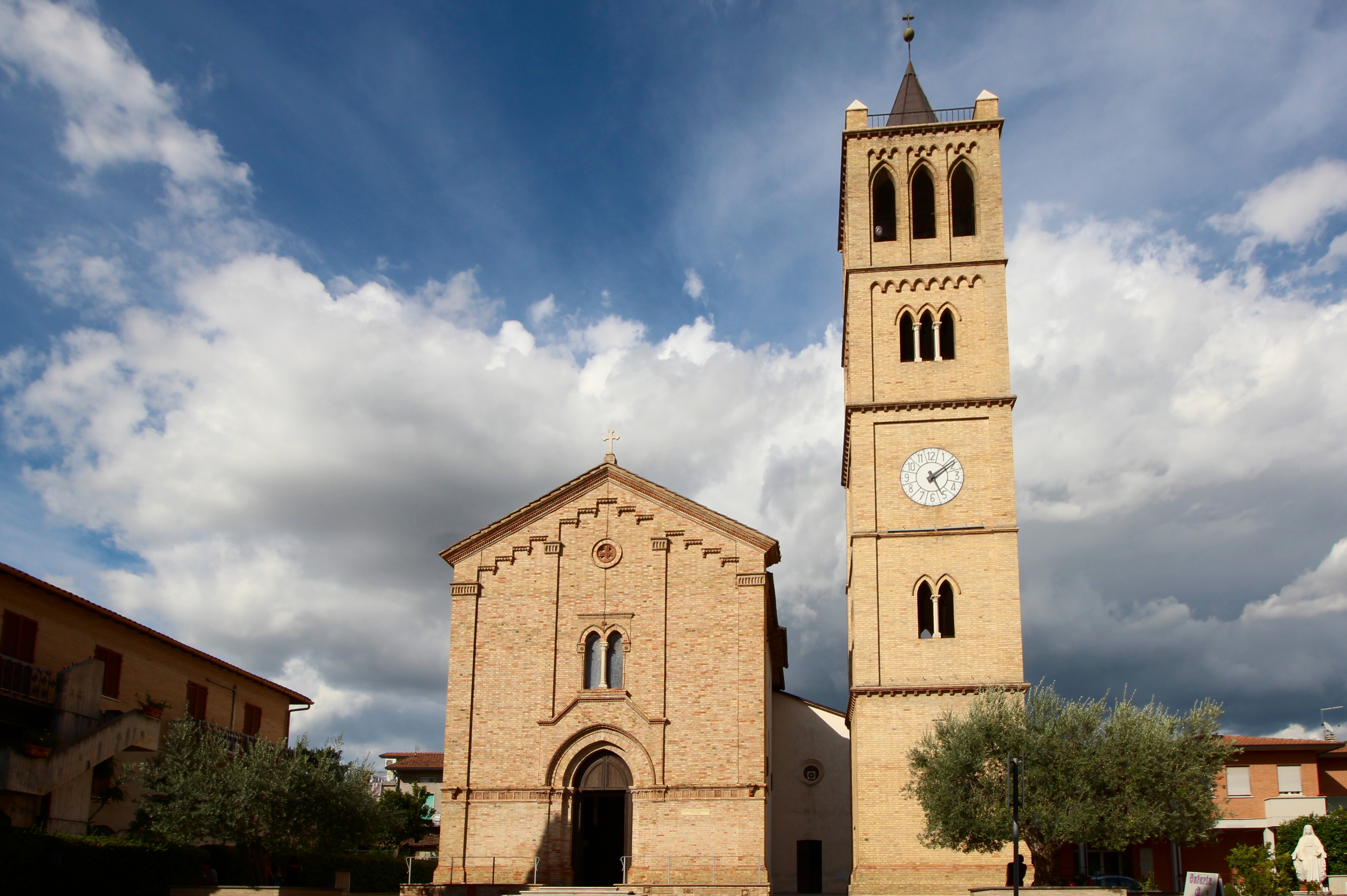
The church Madonna delle Grazie e Santa Tecla
