= Armenzano =

- Frazione
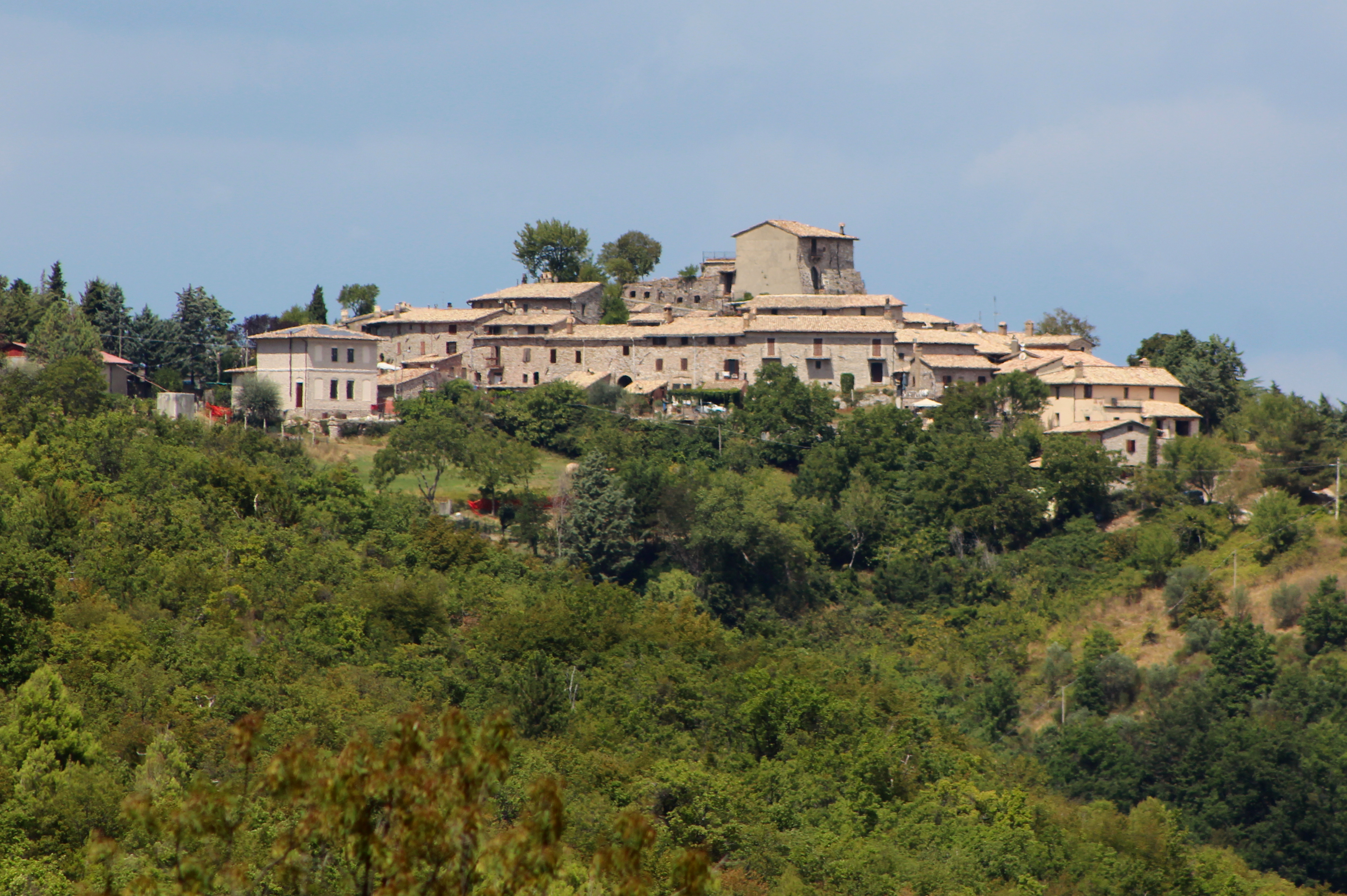
- Armenzano

- Location within Italy
- Coordinates: 43°04′15″N 12°42′01″E
- Country: Italy
- Region: Umbria
- Province: Perugia
- Comune: Assisi
- Elevation: 740 m (2,430 ft)

Population (2001)
  - Total: 40
- Demonym: armenzanesi
- Time zone: UTC+1 (CET)
  - Summer (DST): UTC+2 (CEST)
- Postcode: 06081
- Area code: 075

Armenzano is a frazione of the comune of Assisi in the Province of Perugia, Umbria, central Italy. It stands at an elevation of 759 metres above sea level. At the time of the Istat census of 2001 it had 40 inhabitants.

The climate in Armenzano is warm and temperate. The average temperature is 11.6 degrees Celsius with an average annual rainfall of 915 mm. The driest month is July with 52 mm of rain, while the wettest month is November with 109 mm of rainfall.

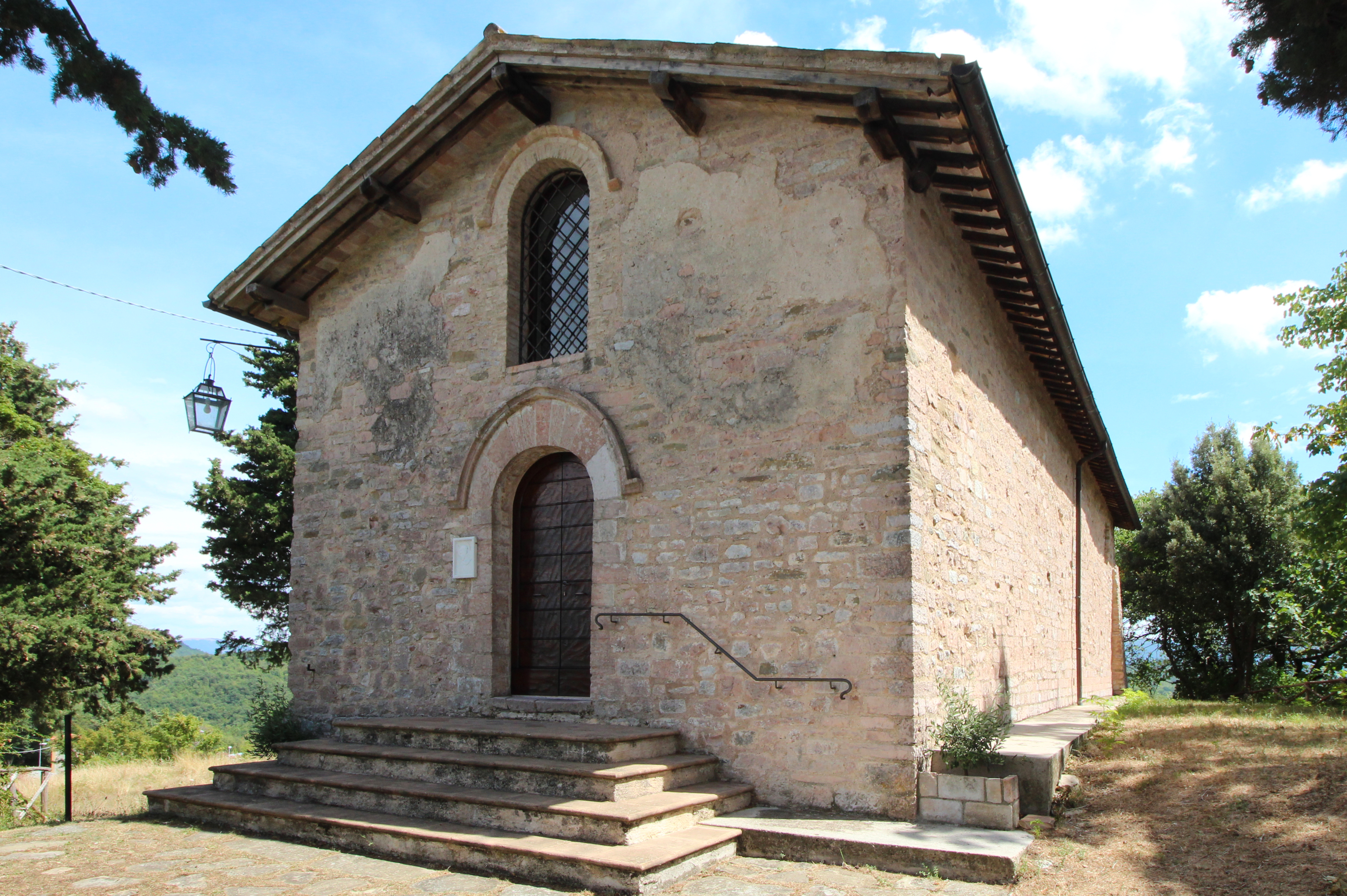
The church Natività di Maria
