= Torchiagina =

- Frazione
- Location within Italy
- Coordinates: 43°07′18″N 12°32′10″E
- Country: Italy
- Region: Umbria
- Province: Perugia
- Comune: Assisi
- Elevation: 220 m (720 ft)

Population (2001)
  - Total: 601
- Time zone: UTC+1 (CET)
  - Summer (DST): UTC+2 (CEST)
- Postcode: 06081
- Area code: 075

Torchiagina is a frazione of the comune of Assisi in the Province of Perugia, Umbria, central Italy. It stands at an elevation of 220 metres above sea level. At the time of the Istat census of 2001 it had 601 inhabitants.
