= Santo Stefano, Assisi =

Church in Assisi, Italy

Coordinates: 43.0720°N 12.6125°E

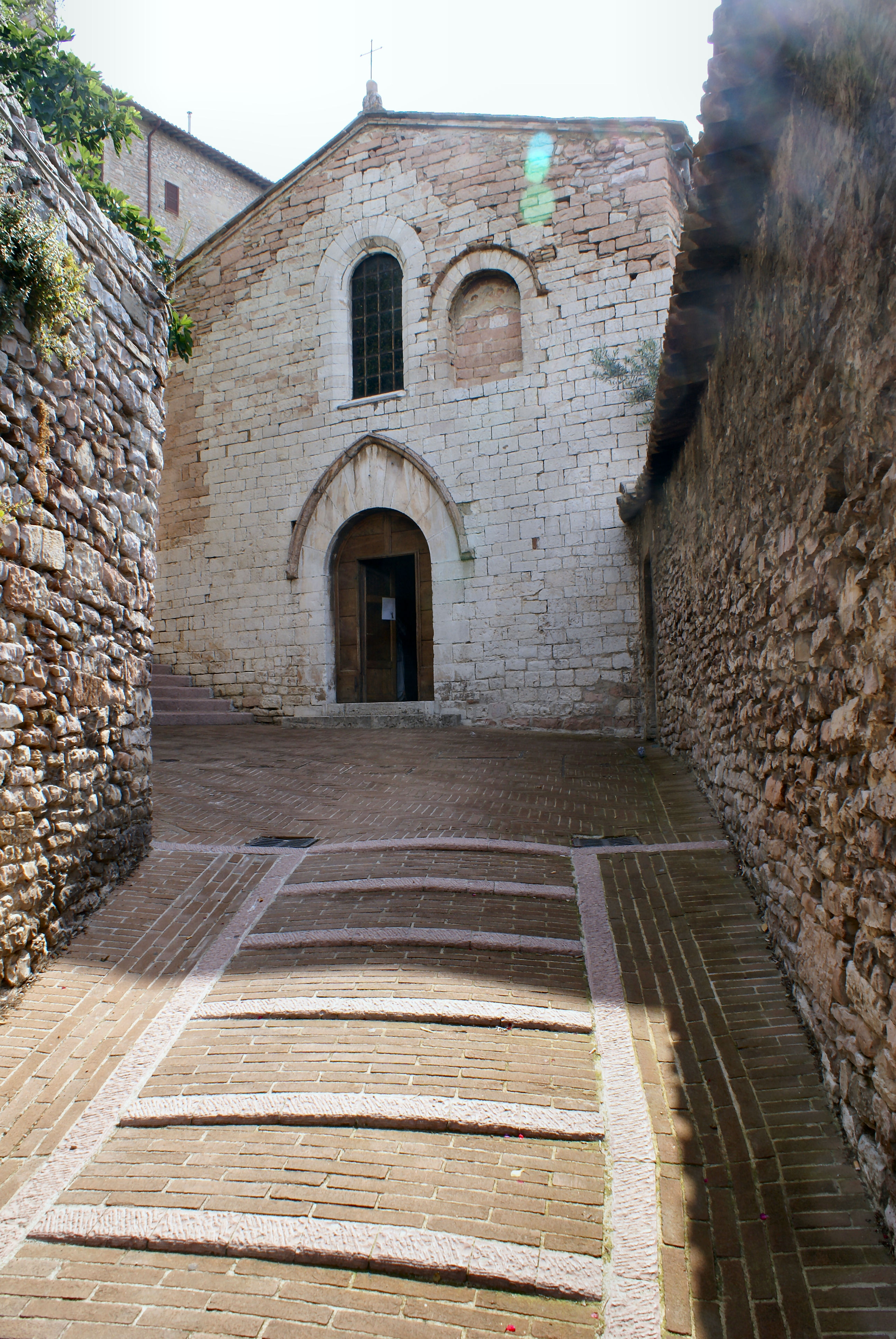
Church of Santo Stefano.

The church of Santo Stefano (Saint Stephen) is a medieval church of Assisi, in central Italy.

== Architecture ==
The building, in Romanesque style, was erected perhaps as early as the mid-eleventh century, although most sources date it to the mid-twelfth. The first time it is mentioned in existing documents is 1229, and at least by 1275 had been elevated to the status of a parish church.

The architecture, being very early, is typically rustic Umbrian and is characterized by simple lines. Like other churches in the town, the façade and the walls were left mostly without decoration. A small niche was added to the façade in the early fourteenth century and once contained a fresco of angels that is now very faded. It is also clear that at some point the doorway was rebuilt, since its original form was rounded, and now the arch is ogival in shape. There is a small bell gable attached to the rear exterior of the church.

The interior, which has maintained much of the original medieval appearance, has a single nave with Gothic arches, small windows and a wooden ceiling. There are remains of two frescoes in the church. One, by a Giottesque painter, depicts the Madonna with Saints Francis and Stephen, and the other is a crucifixion scene.

== Franciscan legend ==
According to a Franciscan tradition, the bells of the ancient church were heard to ring of their own accord at the moment of the death of St. Francis, which occurred at the hour of Vespers on October 3, 1226.

== Sources and references ==
=== Sources ===
- Troiano, G.; A. Pompei. Guida illustrata di Assisi. Terni: Casa Editrice Francescana.
- Santini, L. Assisi. Narni-Terni: Plurigraf.
