= Chiesa Nuova, Assisi =

Church in Umbria, Italy

Coordinates: 43.0704°N 12.6153°E

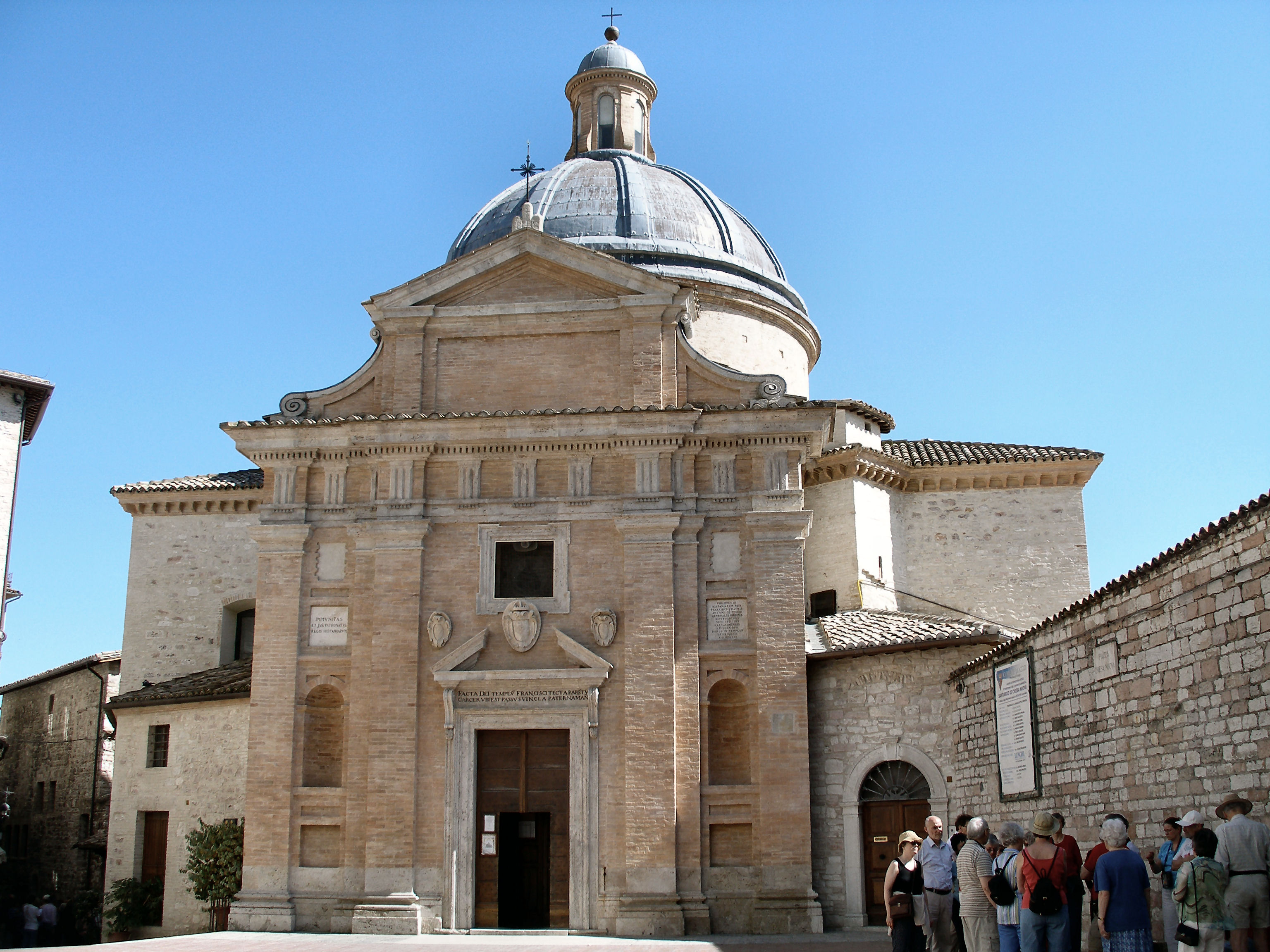
Chiesa Nuova

The Chiesa Nuova is a church in Assisi, Italy, built in 1615 on the site of the presumed birthplace of St. Francis, the house of Pietro di Bernardone. It was then called Chiesa Nuova because it was the last church to be built in Assisi at that time.

It was erected because, during a visit to Assisi in 1613, Antonio de Trejo, the Spanish Vicar General of the Franciscans, was saddened when he saw the original home of St. Francis becoming dilapidated. With the help of the Spanish Embassy in Rome and through a donation of 6,000 ducats by King Philip III of Spain, he was able to buy the house.

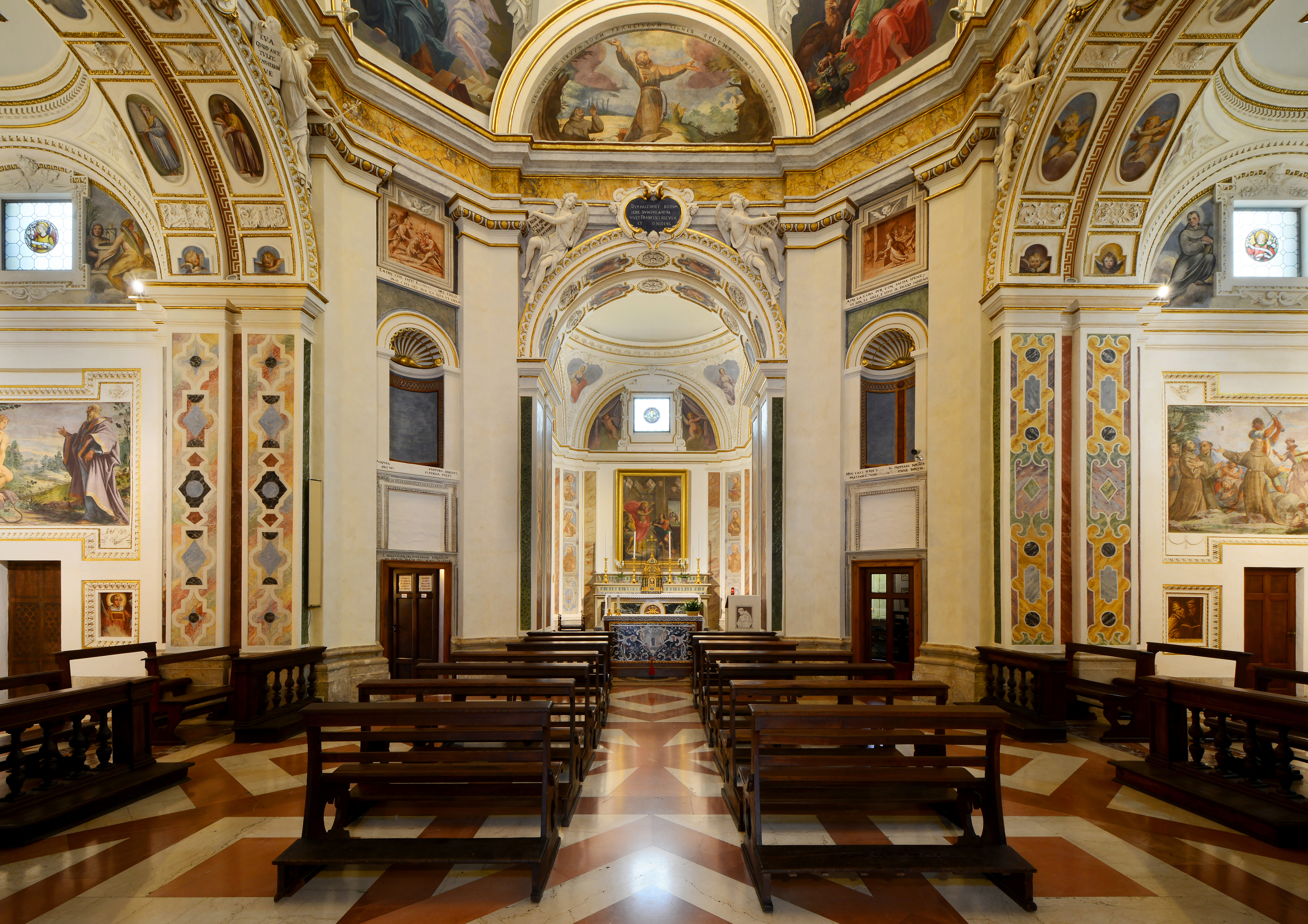
Interior

Pope Paul V authenticated this purchase on 10 July 1615 and blessed the first stone. On 20 September 1615 this foundation stone was then brought, in a solemn procession, from the Cathedral of San Rufino to the building site. The church was built under the supervision of brother Rufino di Cerchiara, who was perhaps also the architect.

The church, built in late Renaissance style, features a high dome divided in coffers, with lantern and a drum. Such a caisson ceiling is a feature of Renaissance architecture. The plan is a Greek cross one, with nave and transepts of the same length, inspired by the church of Sant'Eligio degli Orefici in Rome, one of the few churches designed and built by Raphael. The church is decorated with frescoes by Cesare Sermei and Giacomo Giorgetti (17th century).

The high altar was set over the room of St. Francis. One can also visit the shop where Francis sold his cloth and the stairwell in which Francis was imprisoned by his father. This is the place where Francis decided to answer the divine call and to renounce worldly goods.

The adjoining friary houses a museum and an important Franciscan library with many codices and rare books.

== Sources ==
- Bellucci, Gualtiero (2005). Assisi, Heart of the World. Assisi: Edizioni Porziuncola.
- Costantino, Troiano; Alfonso Pompei. Illustrated guide of Assisi. Assisi: Casa Editrice Francescana dei Fratei Minori Conventuali.
