= Fogliano =

Fogliano may refer to:

- Fogliano, Cascia, a village in the province of Perugia, Italy
- Fogliano, Reggio Emilia, a village in Reggio Emilia, Italy
- Fogliano, Siena, a village in the province of Siena, Italy
- Fogliano Redipuglia, a municipality in Friuli-Venezia Giulia, Italy
