= Opagna =

Coordinates: 42.65671°N 13.09912°E

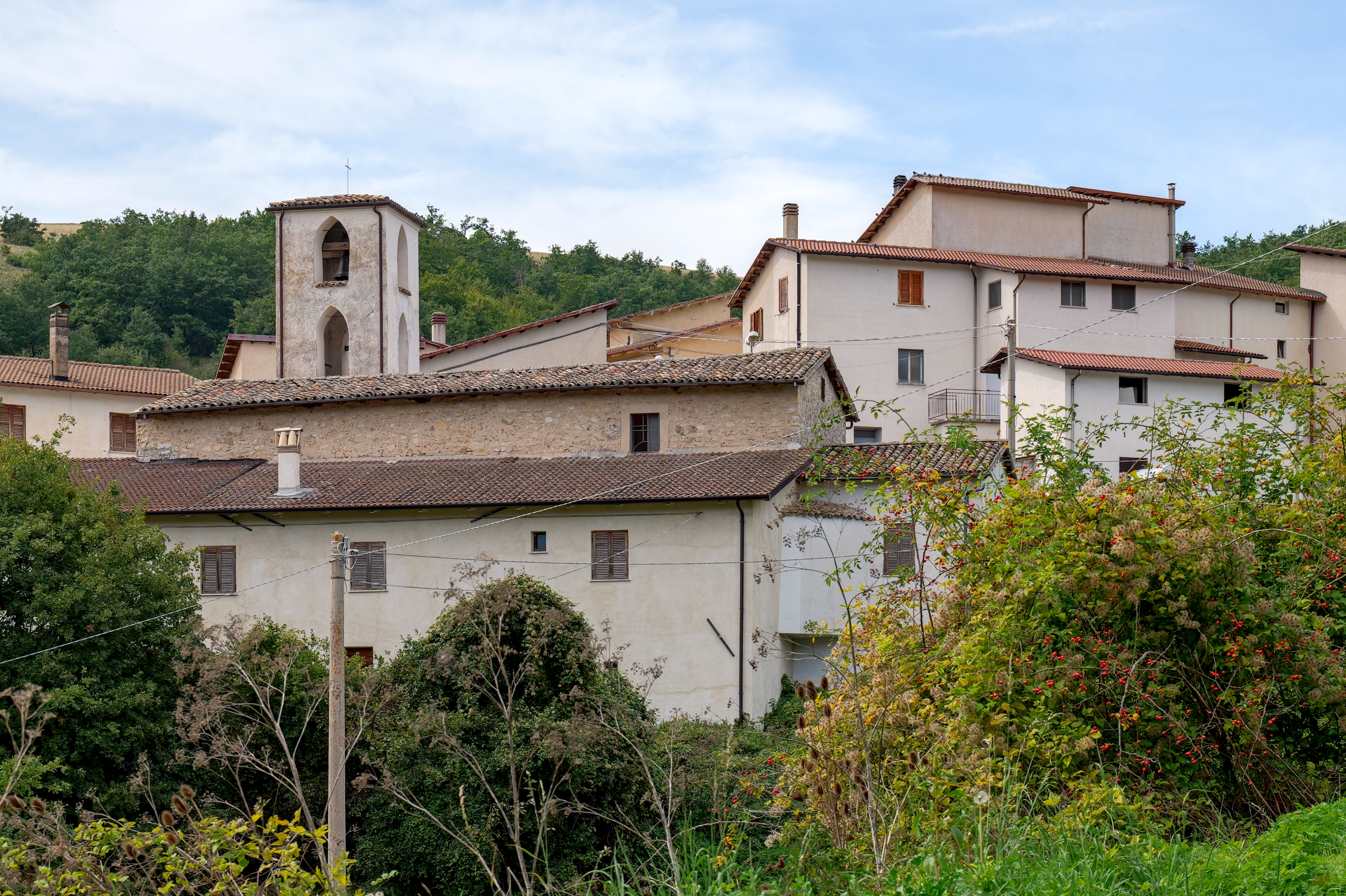
View of Opagna

Opagna is a hamlet (frazione) of the municipality of Cascia in Umbria, Italy. It is situated at an elevation of 1,200 metres (3,900 ft) above sea level.

Opagna is located along the SP 474 provincial road, which connects Cascia with Civita. The hamlet is known for the presence of dairy farms. As of 2021, it had a population of 16 inhabitants. (Note: To obtain the data from the website: 1. Select "Basi Territoriali 2021: Confini amministrativi, Località, Sezioni di censimento, Aree SubCom".; 2. Use the search function to find the desired place.; 3. Click the Attribute Table icon in the top-right corner.; 4. In the panel that appears at the bottom of the page, select "Località 2021".)

== History ==
In 1703, Opagna was completely destroyed by the Apennine earthquakes that struck the territory of Cascia. According to contemporary records, 20 inhabitants were killed and 39 survived.

In 1859, Opagna had a population of 97 inhabitants, living in 16 households and 16 houses.

The Fattoria di Opagna is an agricultural enterprise located in the hamlet. Following the August 2016 Central Italy earthquake, the farm sustained damage and faced operational difficulties.

== Geography ==
Opagna is the highest hamlet of the municipality of Cascia and one of the most distant from the municipal center.
