= San Sisto, Onelli =

Church building in Onelli, Cascia, Italy

Coordinates: 42.690949°N 13.032468°E

San Sisto is a 14th-century pieve or rural parish church just outside the hamlet of Onelli in the town limits of Cascia, in the province of Perugia, region of Umbria, Italy.

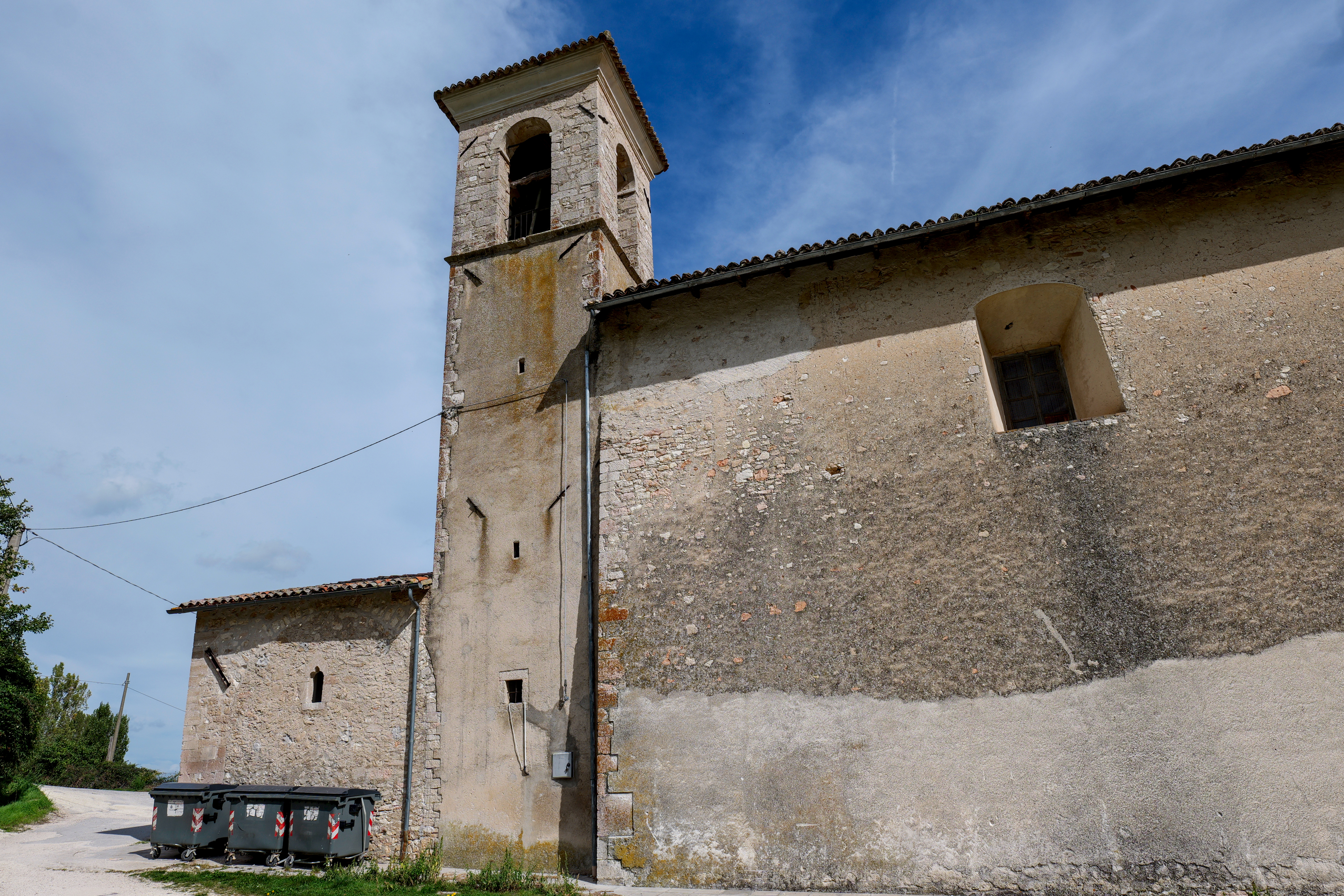
San Sisto church in Onelli

== History ==
The church was built in the 14th century, nearby a castle on these hills protecting the road to Cascia. To this primitive church was added a portico in the following centuries, whose arches are now mainly walled. The heraldic symbol at the entrance recalls the church was once owned by the Benedictines of the Collegiate church and monastery of San Panfilo in Padule. The interior has altarpieces depicting the Annunciation (copy of a work by Carlo Maratta) and a Madonna of the Rosary from the studio of Sebastiano Conca. The organ is from the 18th-century, and restored in 1992. An altarpiece in the church appears to depict the martyrdom of Saint Pope Sixtus II.
