= Giacone =

Giacone is an Italian surname. Notable people with the surname include:

- Marc Giacone (born 1954), Monacan composer, organist, and improviser
- Giuseppe Giaccone (1900–1986), Italian footballer
- Mario Giaccone (born 1945), Italian road cyclist and sporting director

== See also ==
- Colle Giacone, a comune in Umbria, Italy
