= Poggio Primocaso =

- Frazione
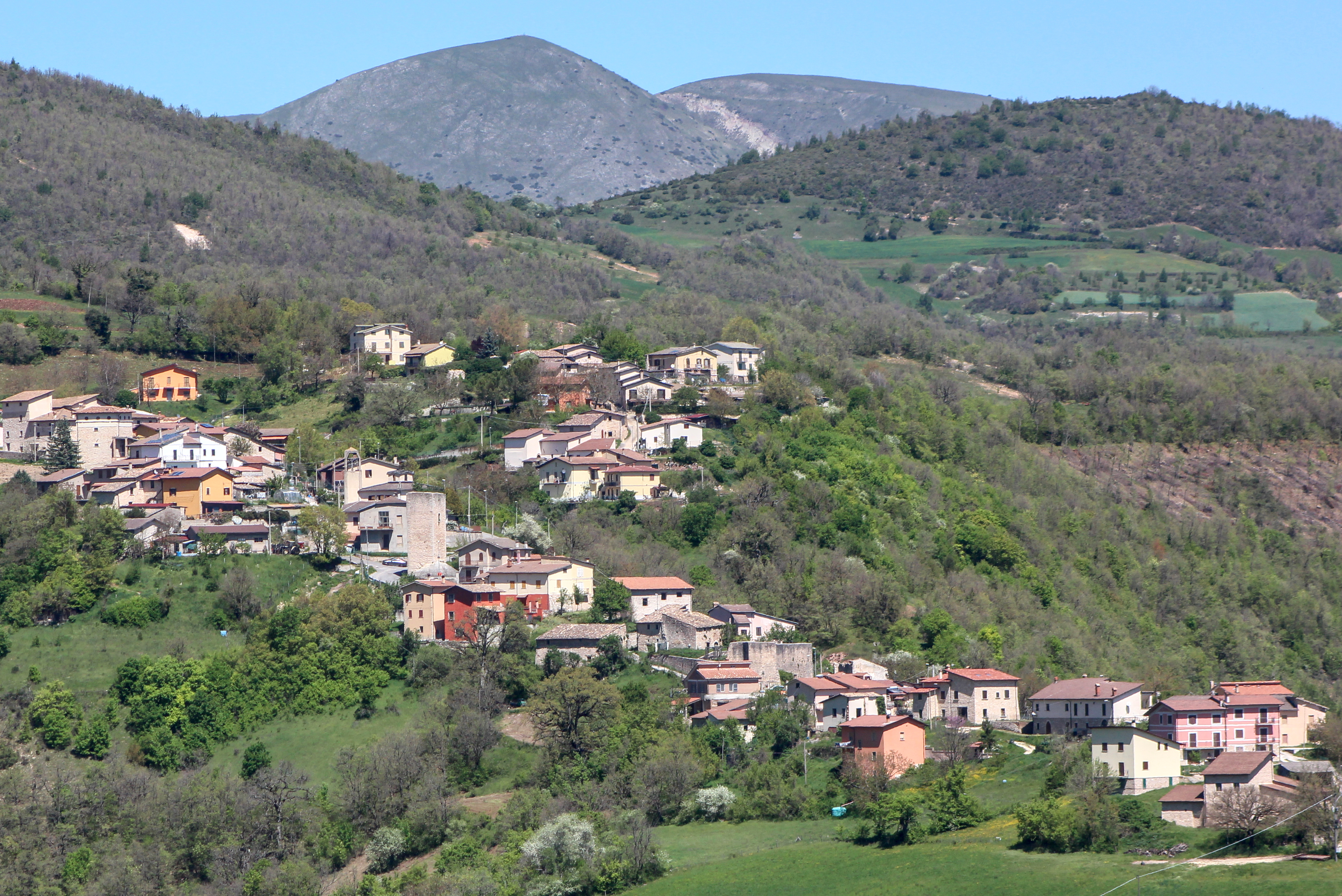
- Poggio Primocaso

- Location within Italy
- Coordinates: 42°45′07″N 12°59′21″E
- Country: Italy
- Region: Umbria
- Province: Perugia
- Comune: Cascia
- Elevation: 831 m (2,726 ft)

Population (2001)
  - Total: 74
- Time zone: UTC+1 (CET)
  - Summer (DST): UTC+2 (CEST)
- Postcode: 06043
- Area code: 0743

Poggio Primocaso is a frazione of the comune of Cascia in the Province of Perugia, Umbria, central Italy. It stands at an elevation of 831 metres above sea level. At the time of the Istat census of 2001 it had 74 inhabitants.

== Images ==
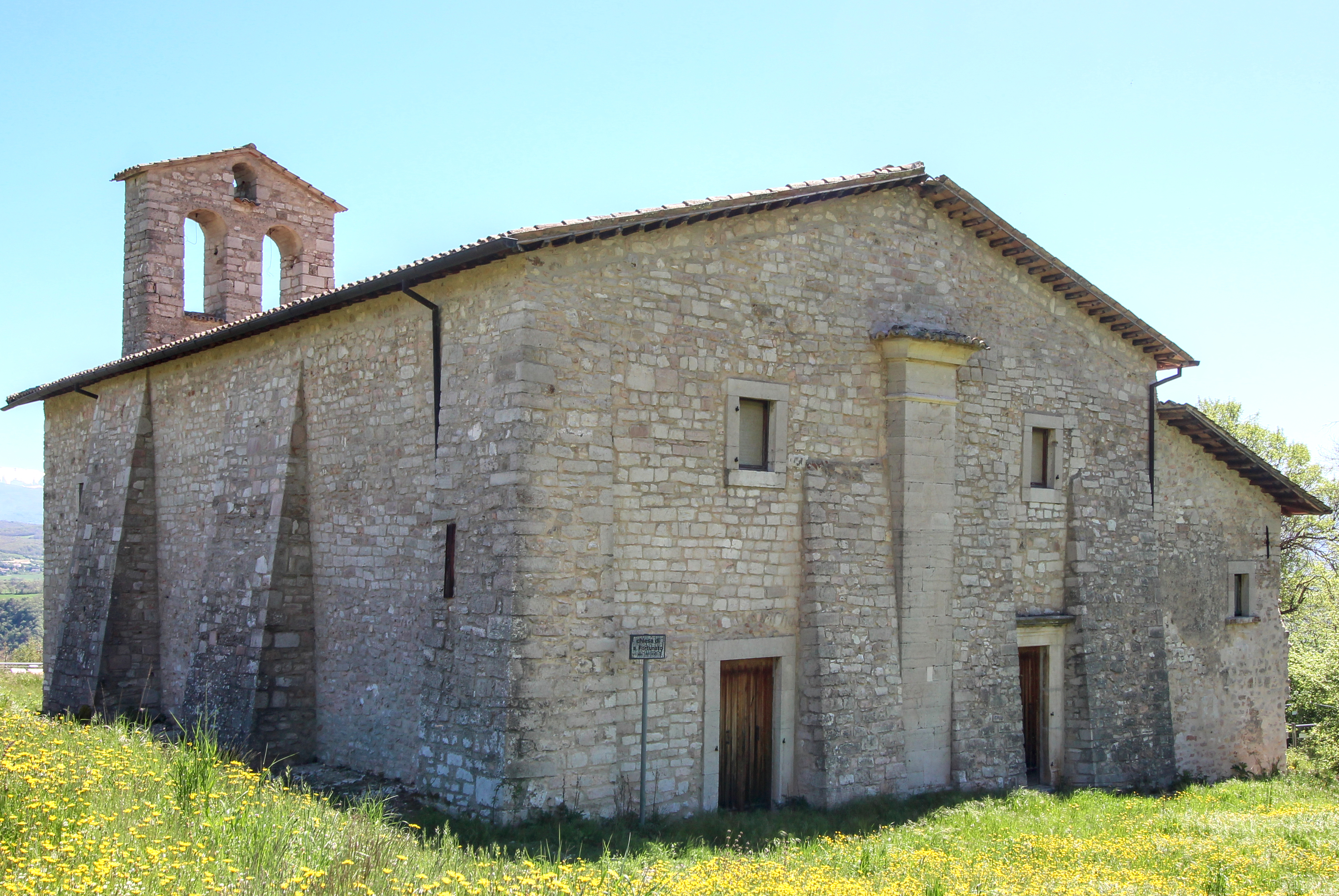
the church San Fortunato

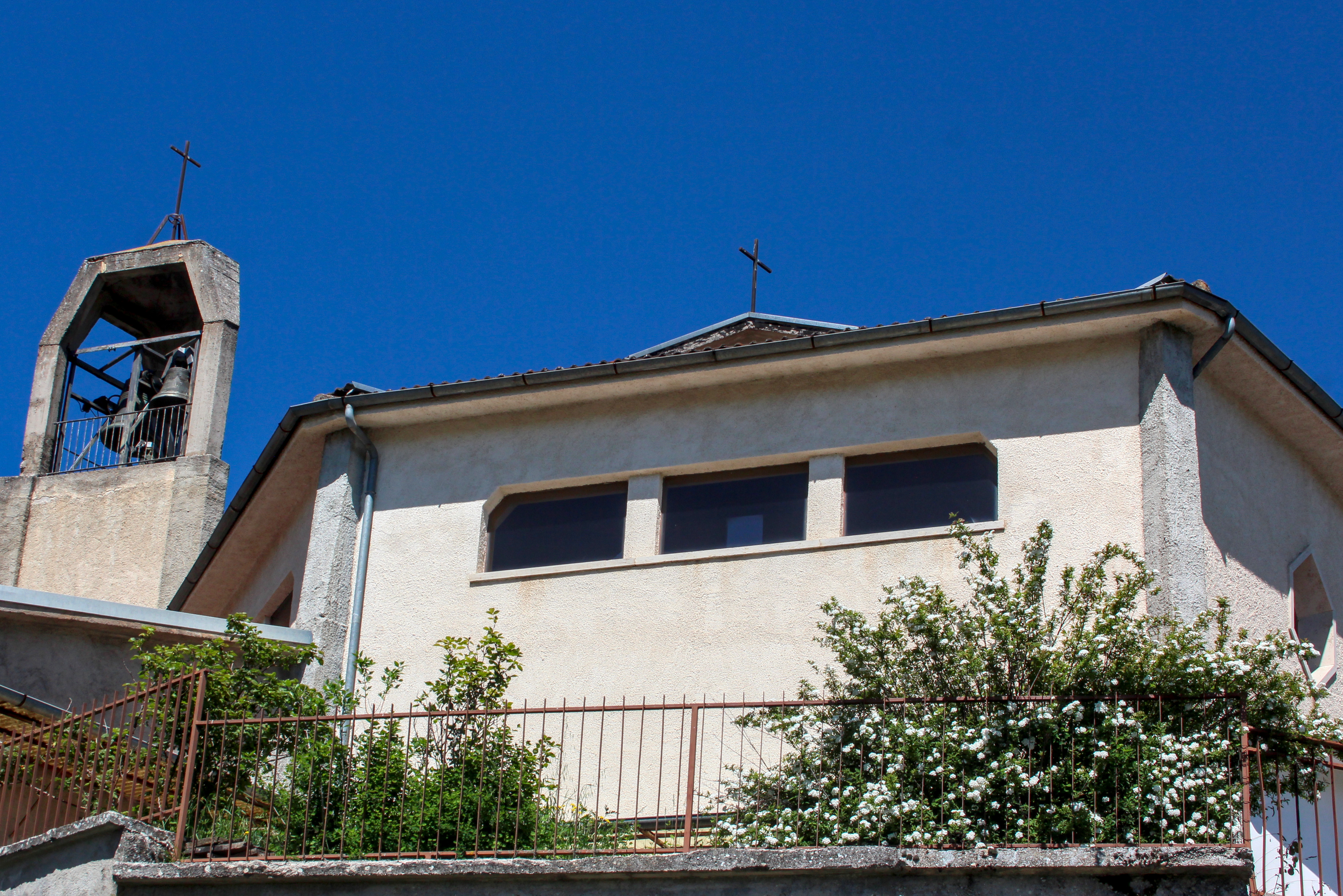
the new church of San Fortunato

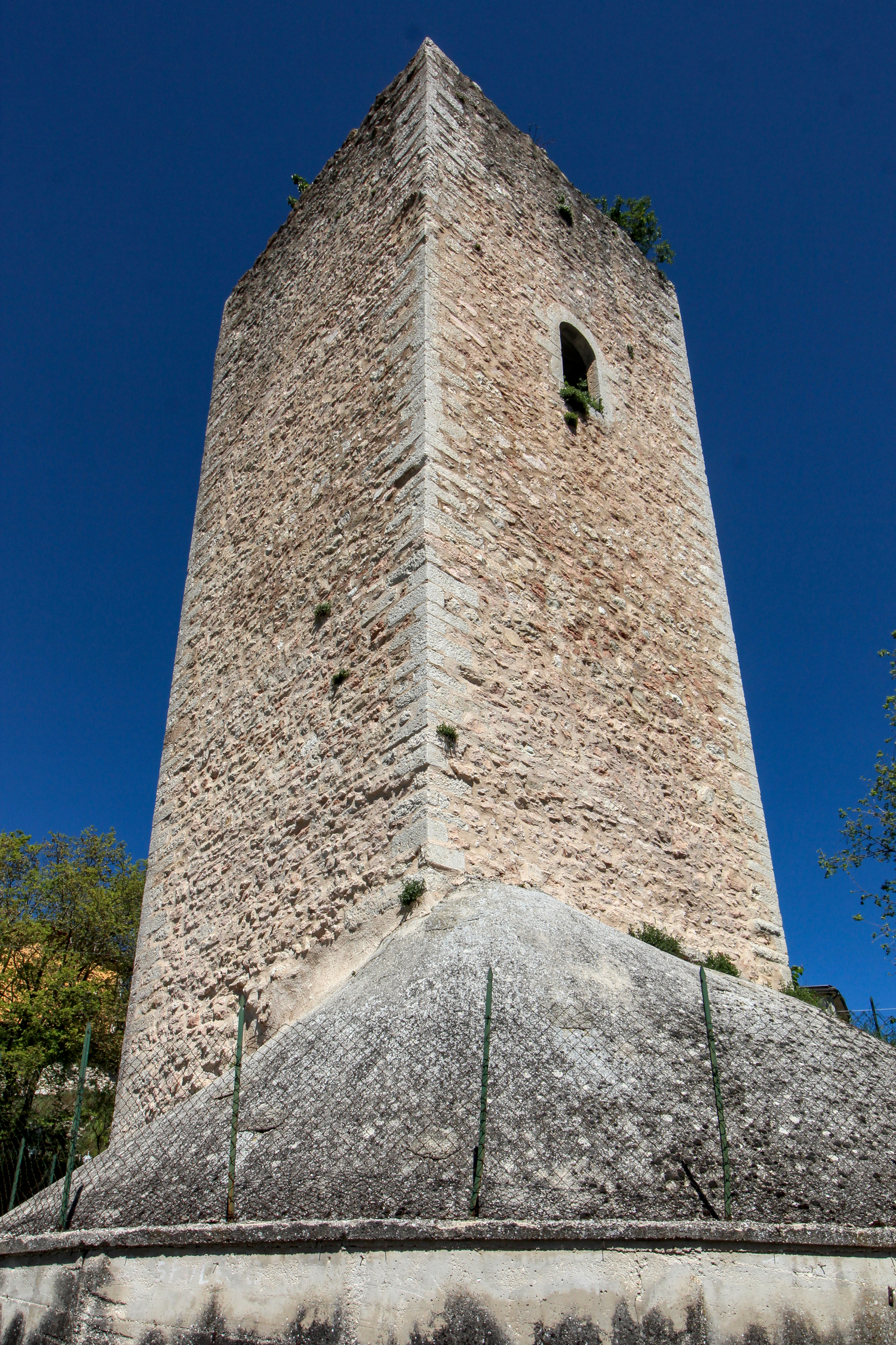
the watch tower
