= San Giorgio, Cascia =

San Giorgio
- Frazione
- San Giorgio

- Location within Italy
- Coordinates: 42°45′02″N 13°01′13″E
- Country: Italy
- Region: Umbria
- Province: Perugia
- Comune: Cascia
- Elevation: 915 m (3,002 ft)

Population (2001)
  - Total: 69
- Time zone: UTC+1 (CET)
  - Summer (DST): UTC+2 (CEST)
- Postcode: 06043
- Area code: 0743

San Giorgio is a frazione of the comune of Cascia in the Province of Perugia, Umbria, central Italy. It stands at an elevation of 915 metres above sea level. At the time of the Istat census of 2001 it had 69 inhabitants.

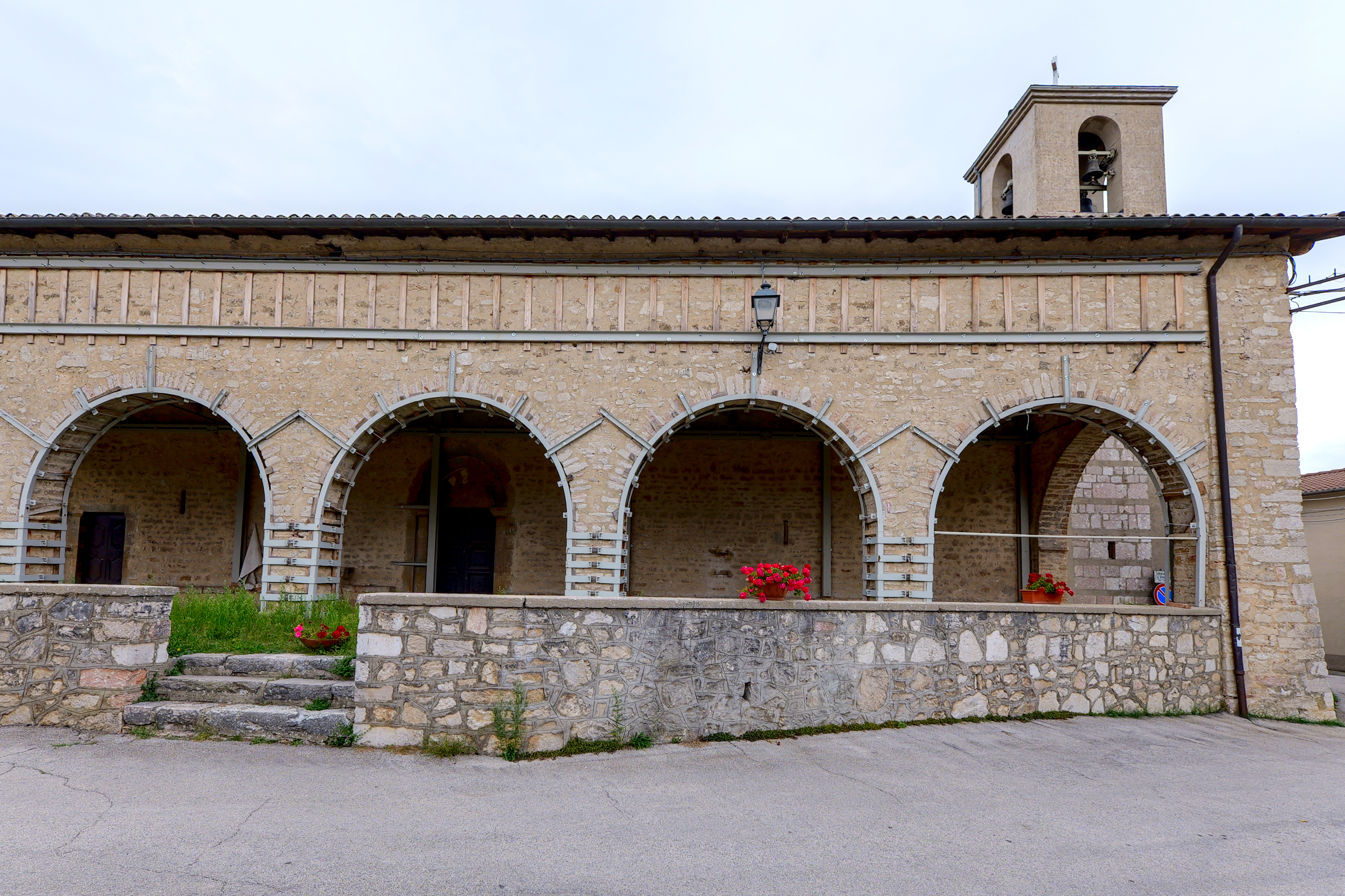
the church of San Giorgio

the church Madonna del Carmine

the church Madonna della Calcara

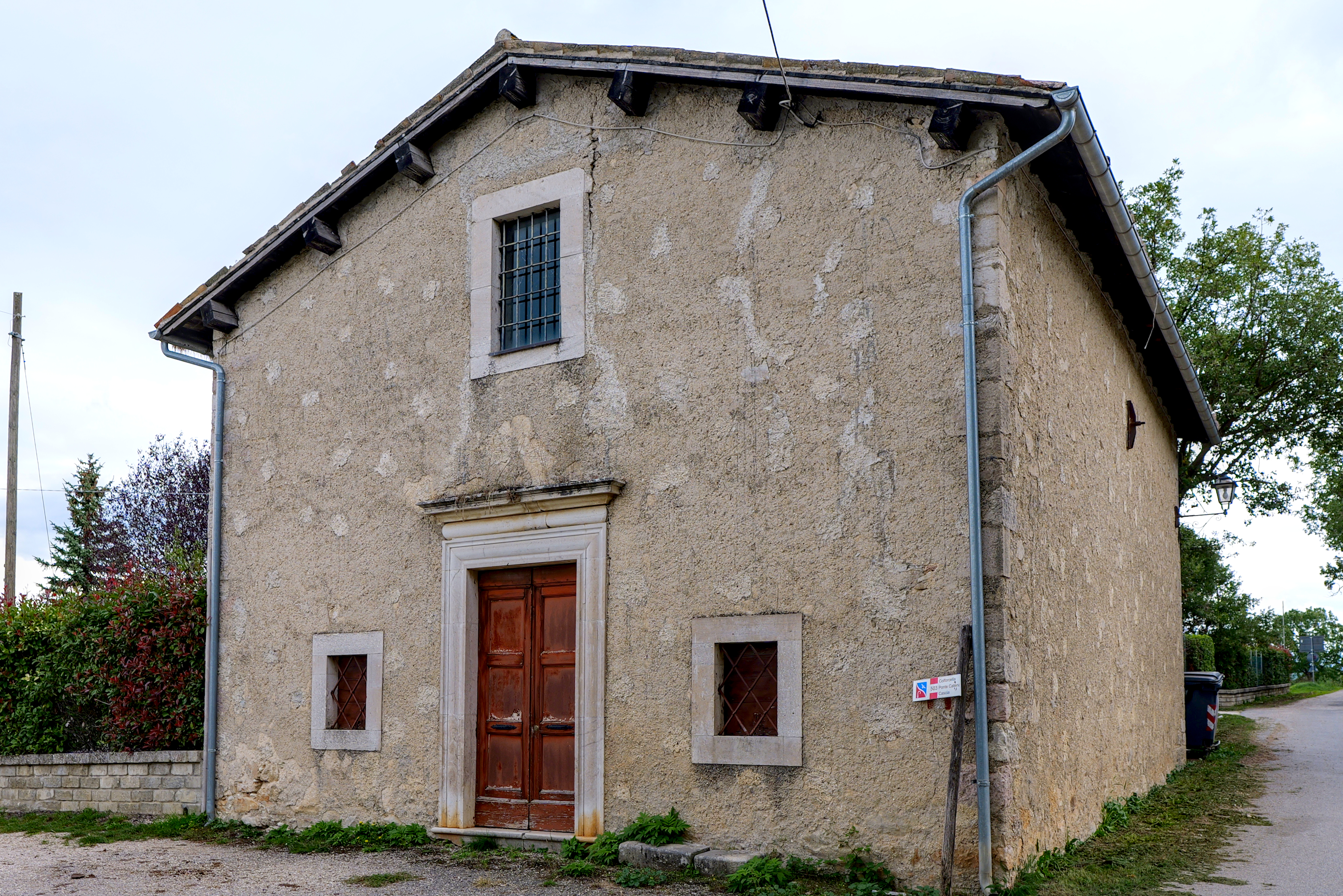
the church Madonna della Croce
