= Avendita =

- Frazione
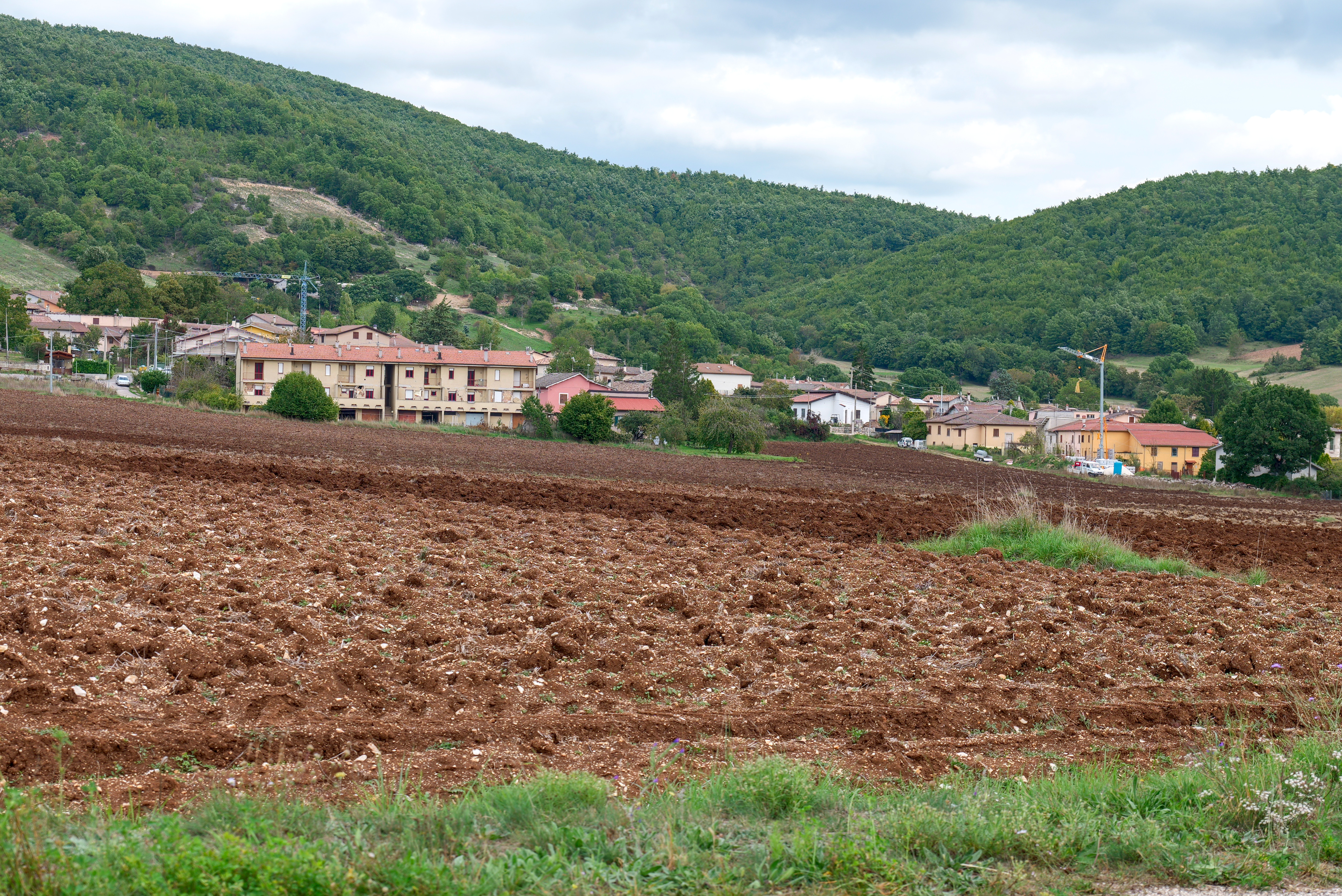
- Avendita

- Location within Italy
- Coordinates: 42°45′35″N 13°03′03″E
- Country: Italy
- Region: Umbria
- Province: Perugia
- Comune: Cascia
- Elevation: 873 m (2,864 ft)

Population (2001)
  - Total: 138
- Time zone: UTC+1 (CET)
  - Summer (DST): UTC+2 (CEST)
- Postcode: 06043
- Area code: 0743

Avendita (Italian pronunciation: [aˈvɛndita]) is a frazione of the comune of Cascia in the Province of Perugia, Umbria, central Italy. It stands at an elevation of 873 metres above sea level. At the time of the Istat census of 2001 it had 138 inhabitants.

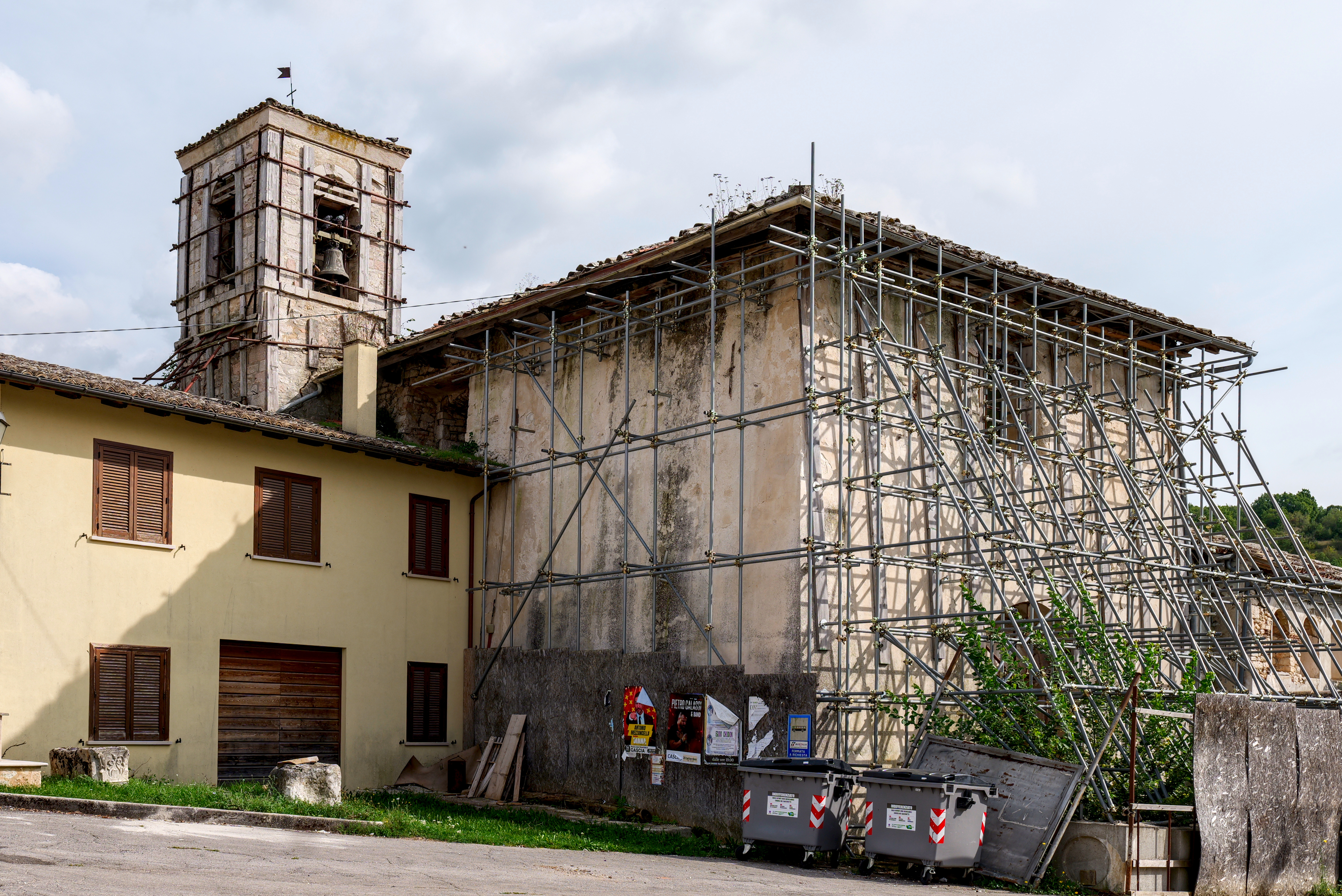
the church of San Procolo

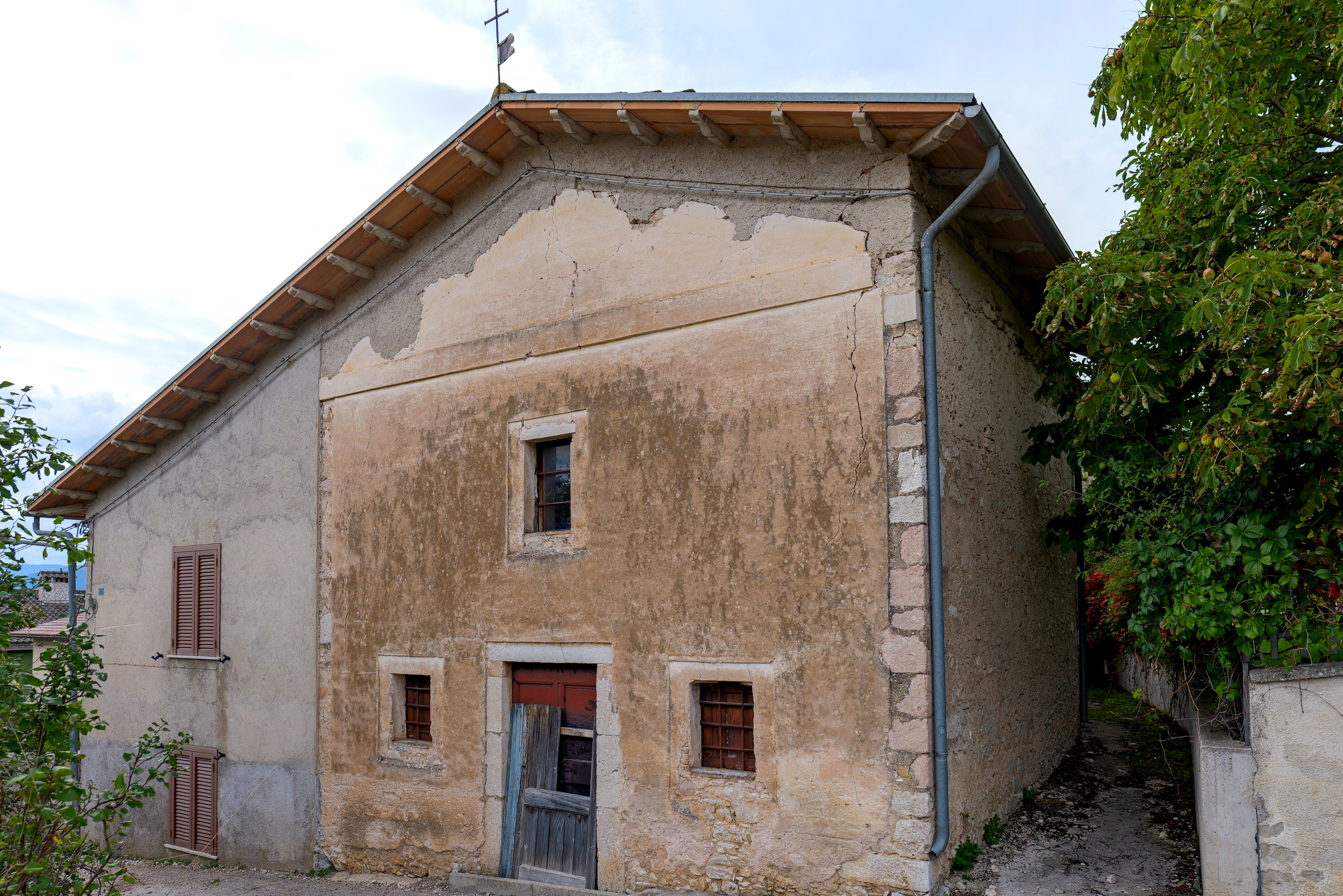
the church of Sant'Anna
