= Padule =

- Frazione
- Location within Italy
- Coordinates: 42°43′09″N 13°01′52″E
- Country: Italy
- Region: Umbria
- Province: Perugia
- Comune: Cascia
- Elevation: 601 m (1,972 ft)

Population (2001)
  - Total: 45
- Time zone: UTC+1 (CET)
  - Summer (DST): UTC+2 (CEST)
- Postcode: 06043
- Area code: 0743

Padule is a frazione of the comune of Cascia in the Province of Perugia, Umbria, central Italy. It stands at an elevation of 601 metres above sea level. At the time of the Istat census of 2001 it had 45 inhabitants.
