= Trognano =

- Frazione
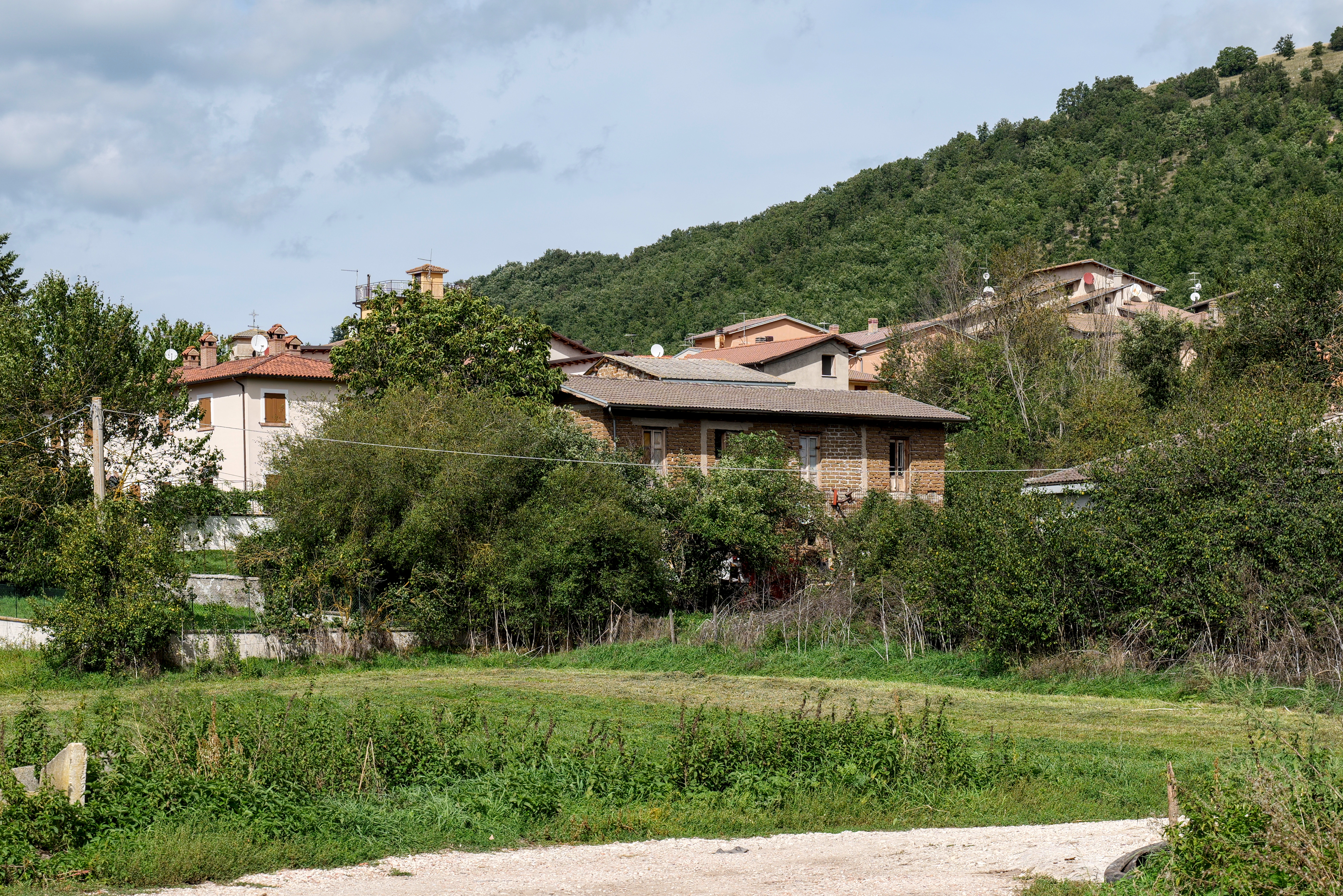
- Trognano

- Location within Italy
- Coordinates: 42°37′56″N 13°03′52″E
- Country: Italy
- Region: Umbria
- Province: Perugia
- Comune: Cascia
- Elevation: 987 m (3,238 ft)

Population (2001)
  - Total: 35
- Time zone: UTC+1 (CET)
  - Summer (DST): UTC+2 (CEST)
- Postcode: 06043
- Area code: 0743

Trognano is a frazione of the comune of Cascia in the Province of Perugia, Umbria, central Italy. It stands at an elevation of 1000 metres above sea level. At the time of the Istat census of 2001 it had 35 inhabitants.
