= Villa San Silvestro =

- Frazione
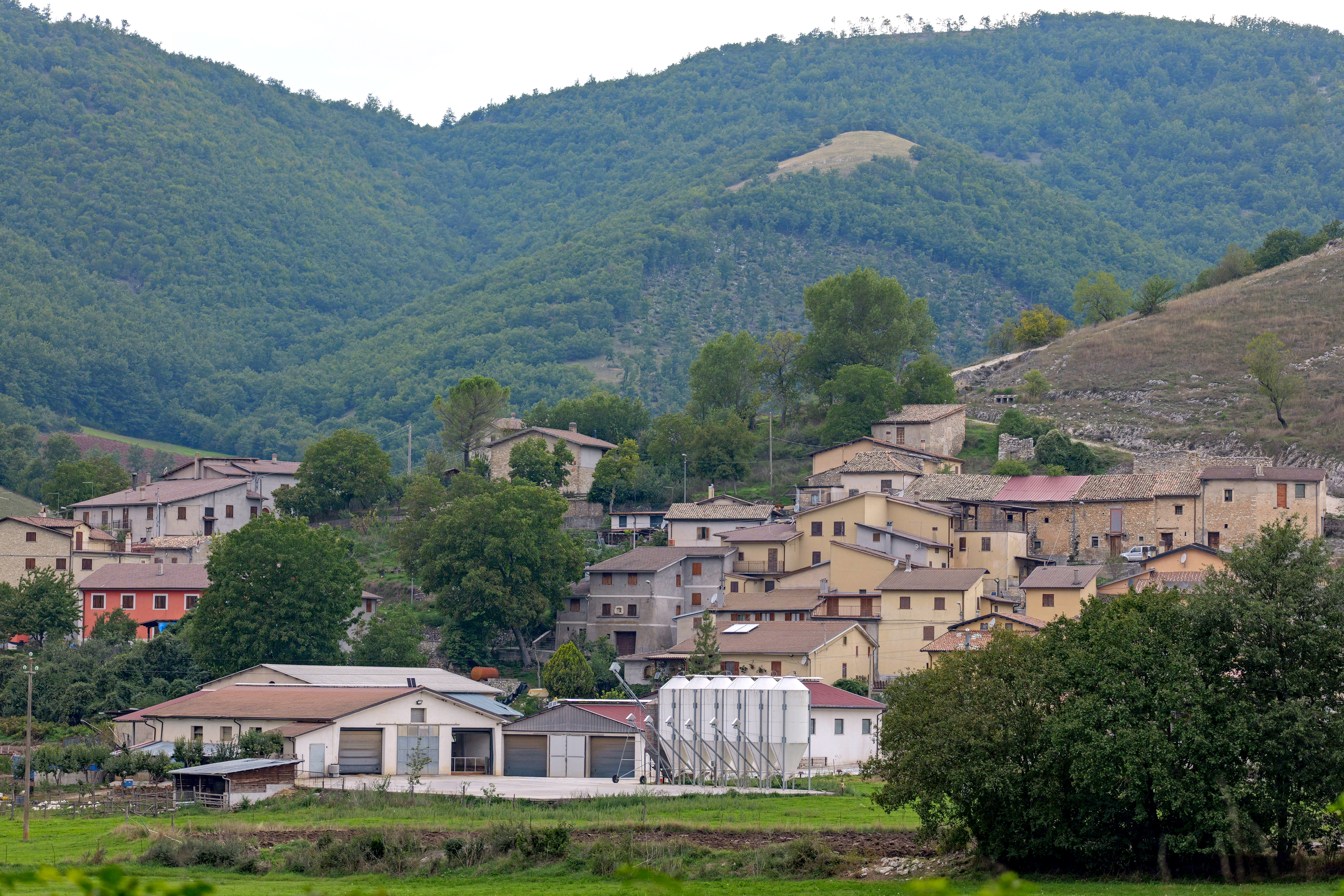
- Villa San Silvestro

- Location within Italy
- Coordinates: 42°39′06″N 13°03′16″E
- Country: Italy
- Region: Umbria
- Province: Perugia
- Comune: Cascia
- Elevation: 991 m (3,251 ft)

Population (2001)
  - Total: 29
- Time zone: UTC+1 (CET)
  - Summer (DST): UTC+2 (CEST)
- Postcode: 06043
- Area code: 0743

Villa San Silvestro is a frazione of the comune of Cascia in the Province of Perugia, Umbria, central Italy. It stands at an elevation of 991 metres above sea level. At the time of the Istat census of 2001 it had 29 inhabitants.
