= Chiavano =

- Frazione
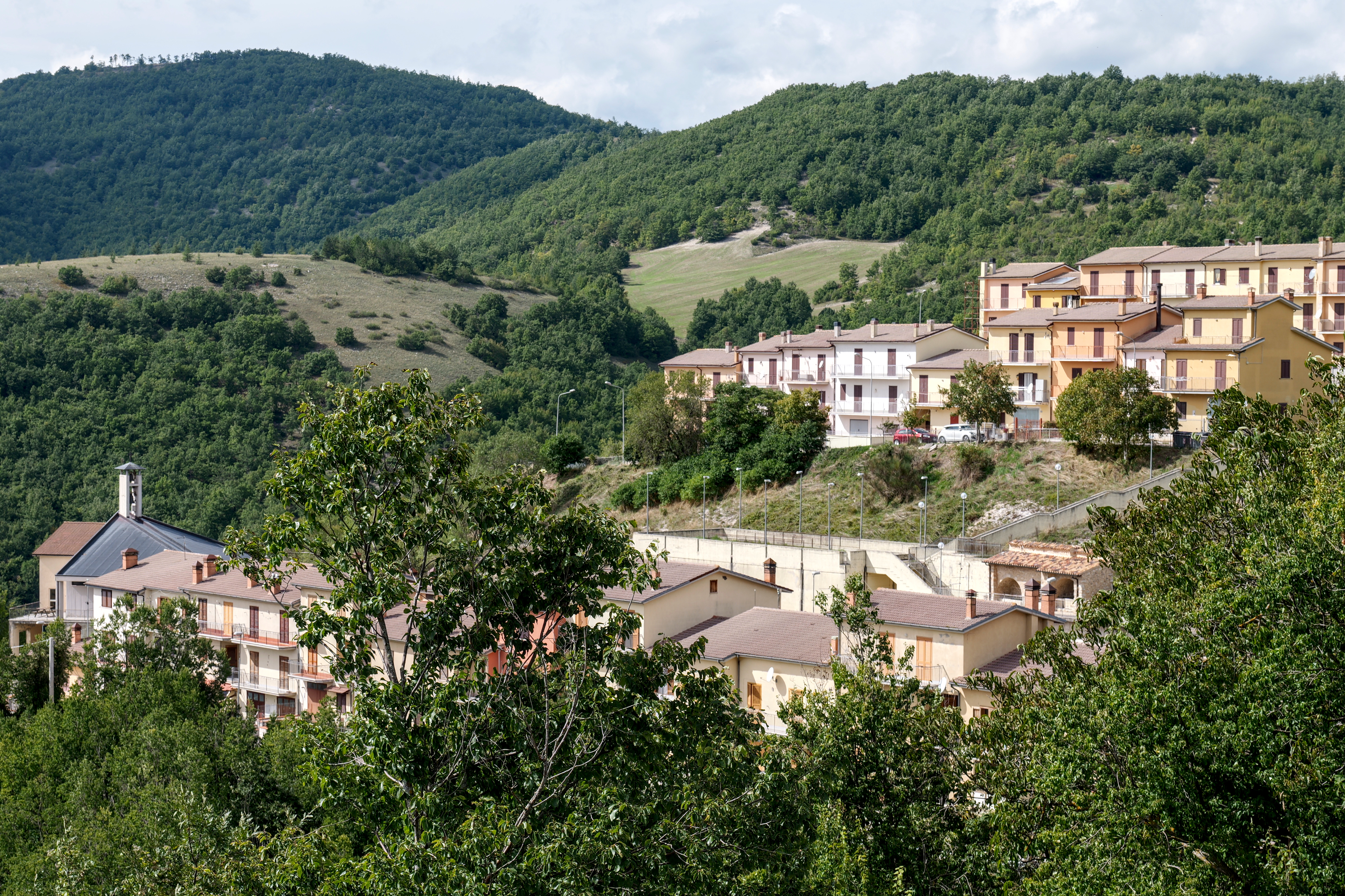
- Chiavano

- Location within Italy
- Coordinates: 42°39′22″N 13°03′47″E
- Country: Italy
- Region: Umbria
- Province: Perugia
- Comune: Cascia
- Elevation: 1,128 m (3,701 ft)

Population (2001)
  - Total: 38
- Time zone: UTC+1 (CET)
  - Summer (DST): UTC+2 (CEST)
- Postcode: 06043
- Area code: 0743

Chiavano is a frazione of the comune of Cascia in the Province of Perugia, Umbria, central Italy. It stands at an elevation of 1128 metres above sea level. At the time of the Istat census of 2001 it had 38 inhabitants.

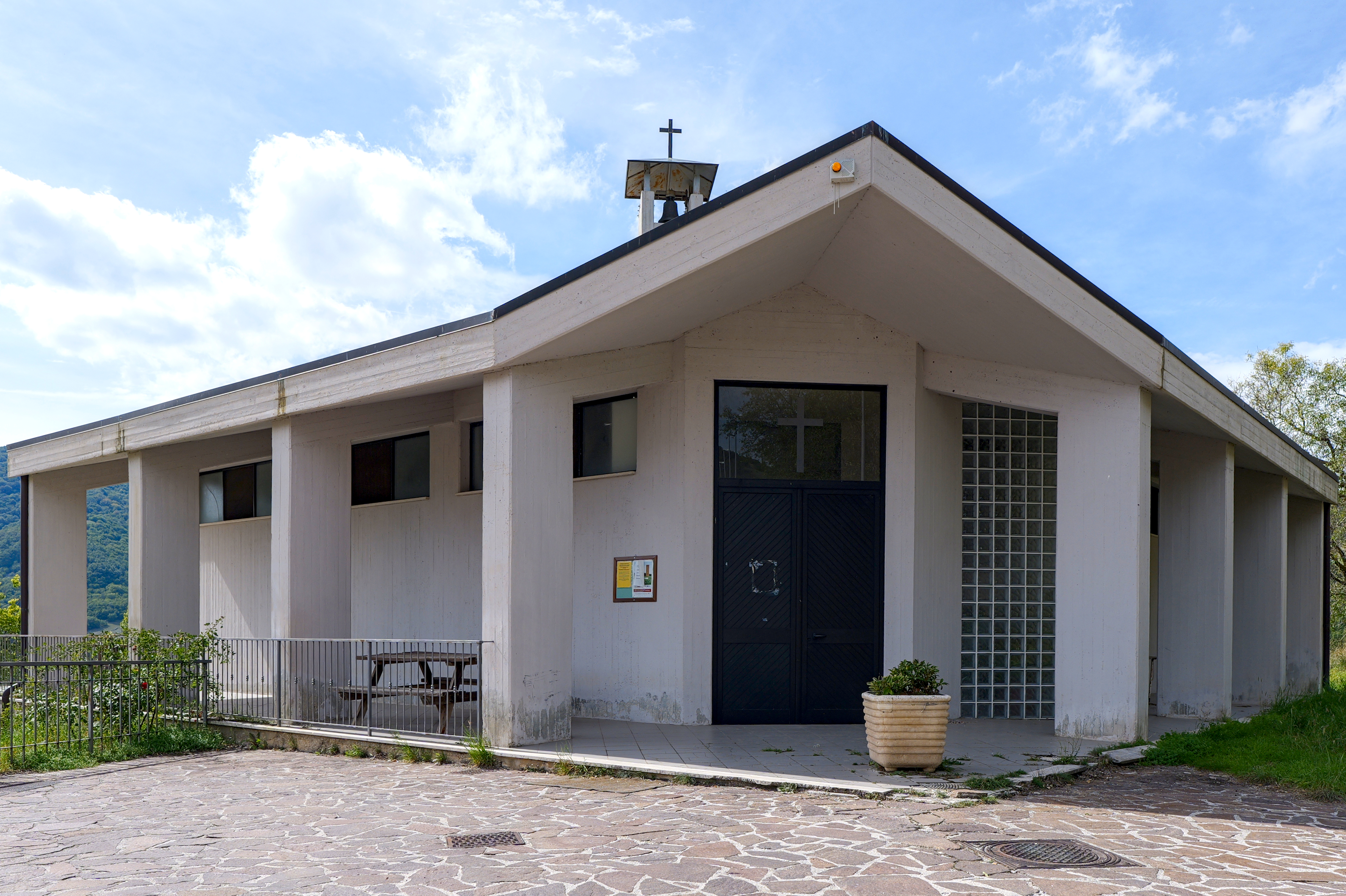
the church of Sant'Ilario nuovo

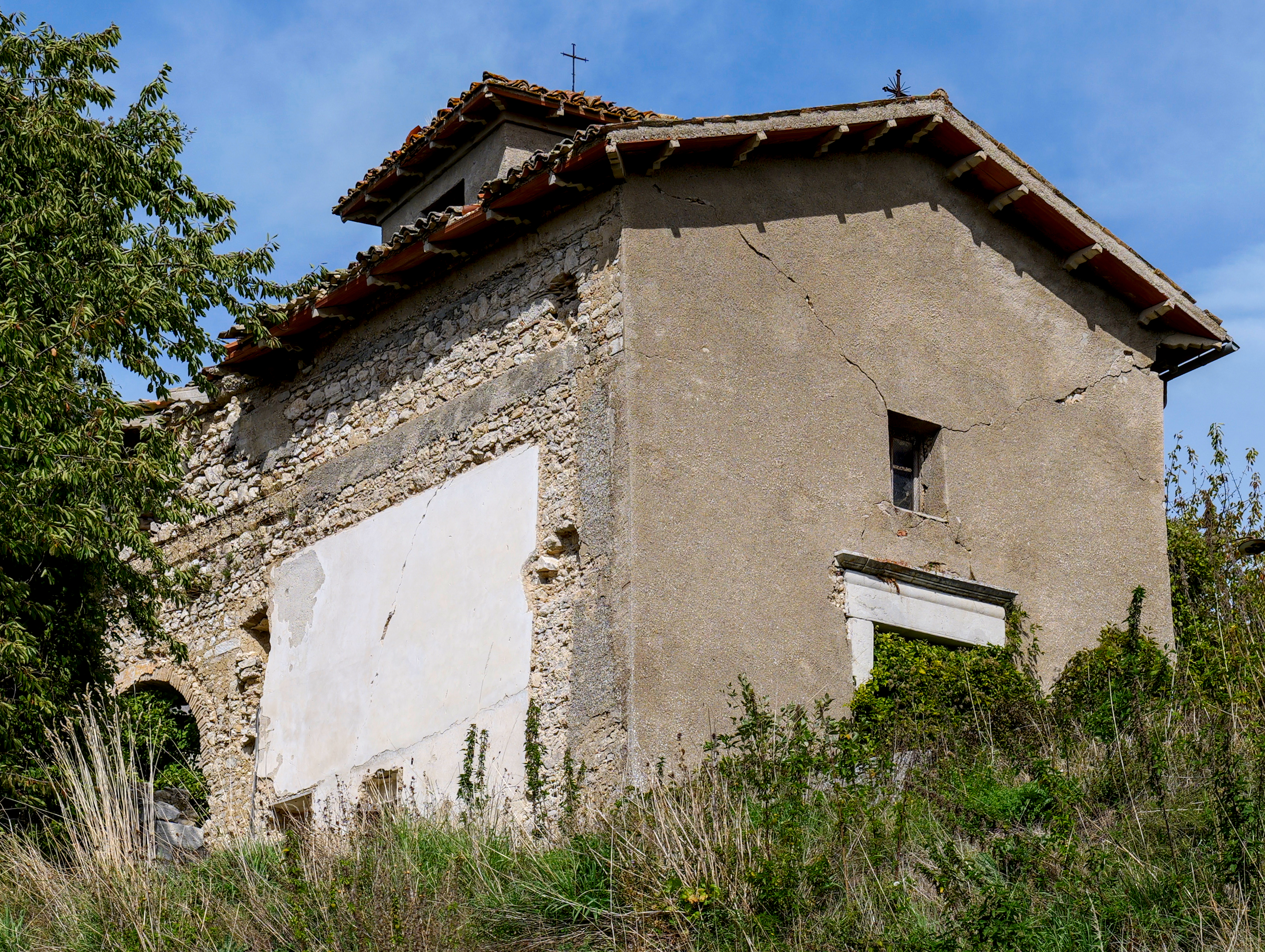
the church ruin of Sant'Ilario vecchio
