= Onelli =

- Frazione
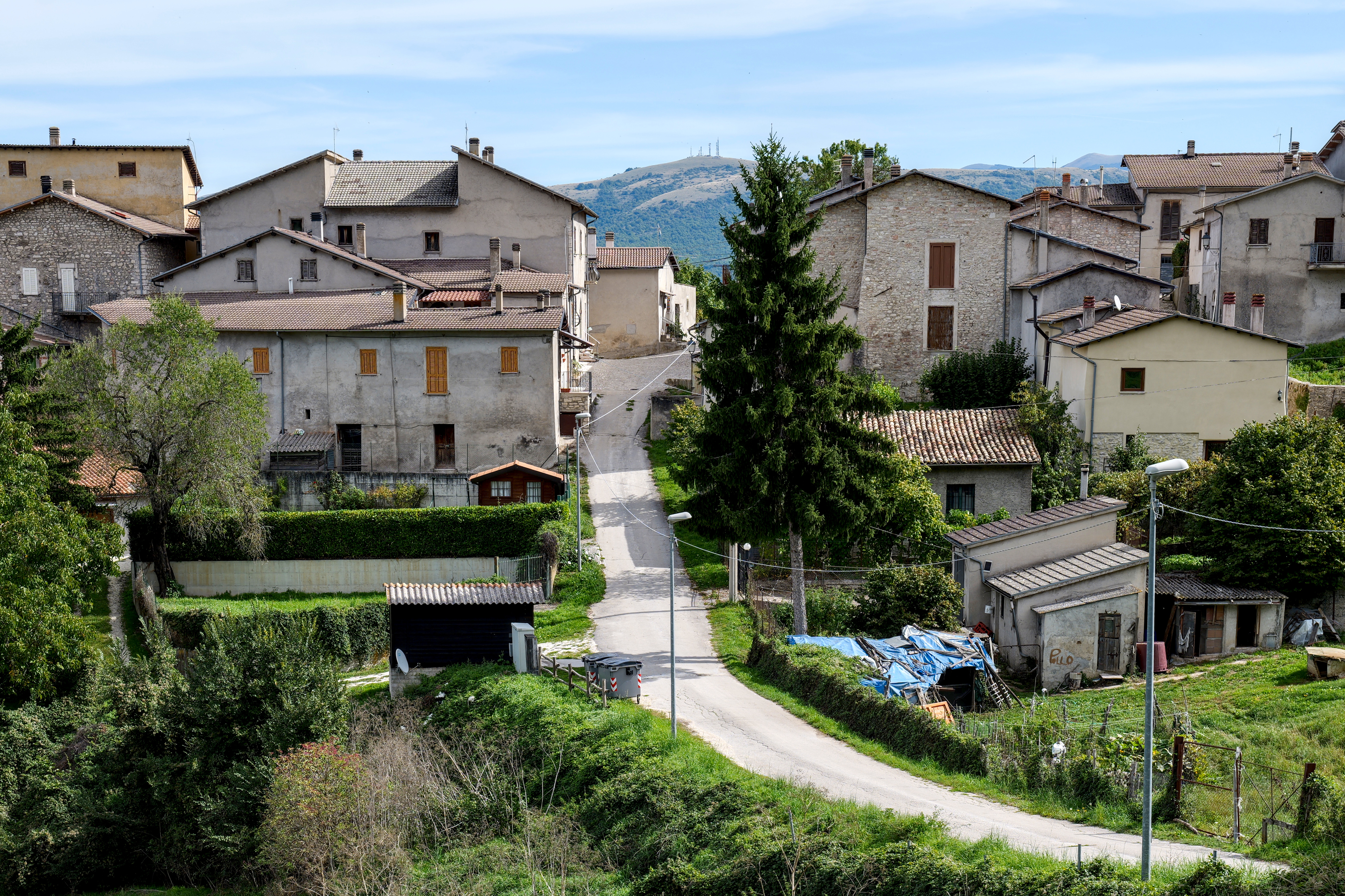
- Onelli

- Location within Italy
- Coordinates: 42°41′43″N 13°01′58″E
- Country: Italy
- Region: Umbria
- Province: Perugia
- Comune: Cascia
- Elevation: 953 m (3,127 ft)

Population (2001)
  - Total: 51
- Time zone: UTC+1 (CET)
  - Summer (DST): UTC+2 (CEST)
- Postcode: 06043
- Area code: 0743

Onelli is a frazione of the comune of Cascia in the Province of Perugia, Umbria, central Italy. It stands at an elevation of 953 metres above sea level. At the time of the Istat census of 2001 it had 51 inhabitants. Just outside the hamlet, is the 14th-century church of San Sisto.
