= Maltignano, Cascia =

Maltignano
- Frazione
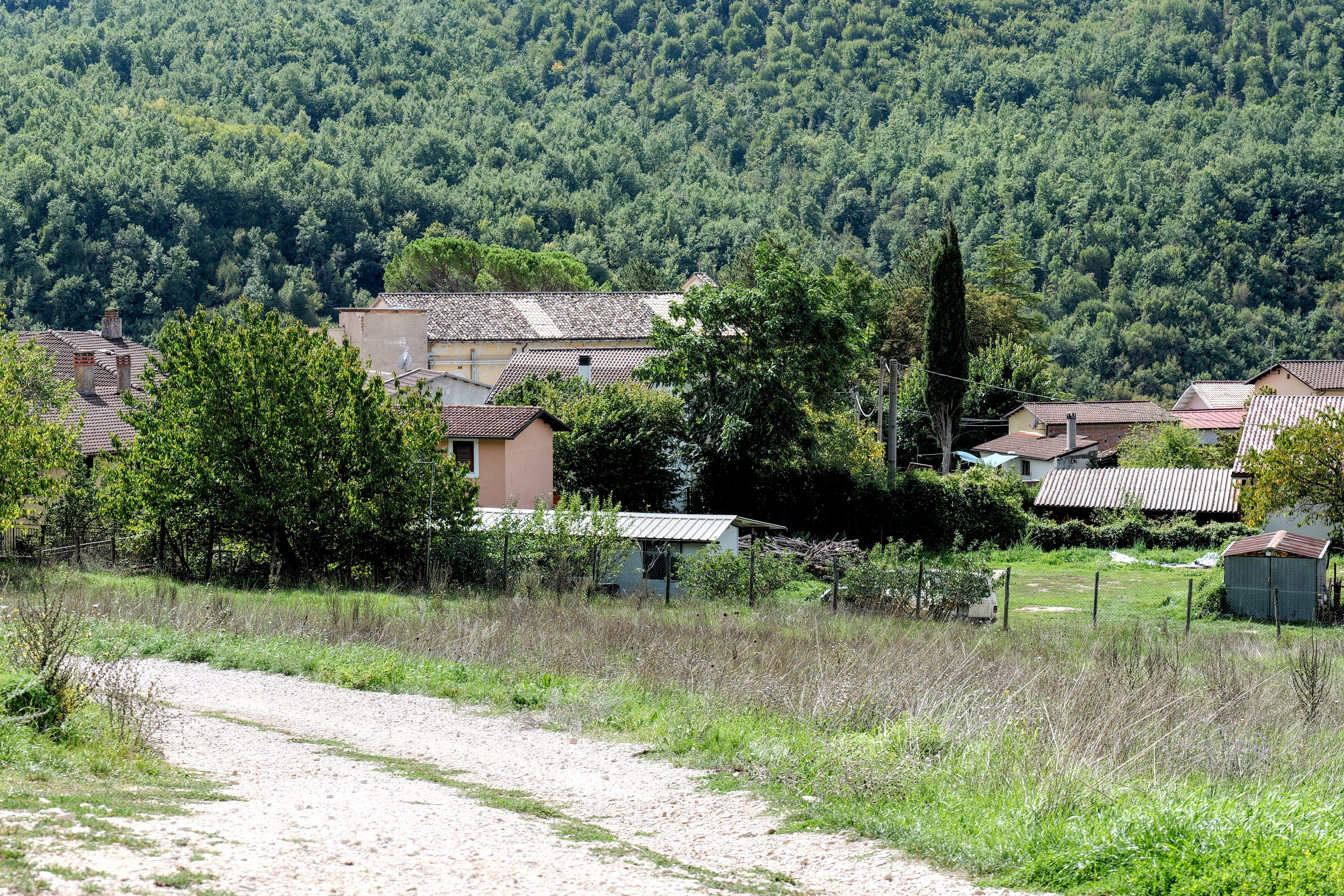
- Maltignano

- Location within Italy
- Coordinates: 42°42′43″N 13°03′20″E
- Country: Italy
- Region: Umbria
- Province: Perugia
- Comune: Cascia
- Elevation: 714 m (2,343 ft)

Population (2001)
  - Total: 130
- Time zone: UTC+1 (CET)
  - Summer (DST): UTC+2 (CEST)
- Postcode: 06043
- Area code: 0743

Maltignano is a frazione of the comune of Cascia in the Province of Perugia, Umbria, central Italy. It stands at an elevation of 714 metres above sea level. At the time of the Istat census of 2001 it had 130 inhabitants.
