= Ocosce =

- Frazione
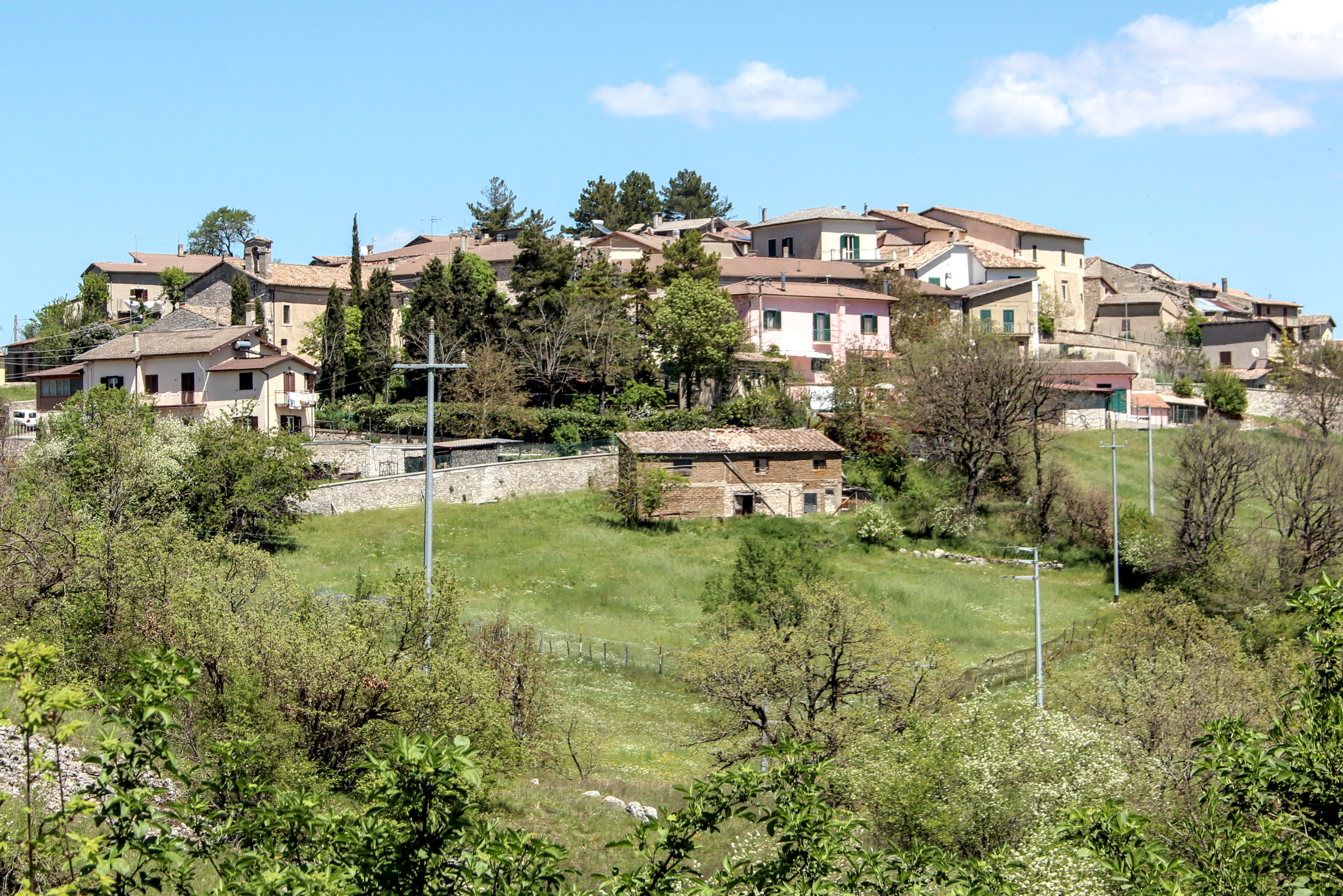
- Ocosce

- Location within Italy
- Coordinates: 42°42′57″N 12°59′56″E
- Country: Italy
- Region: Umbria
- Province: Perugia
- Comune: Cascia
- Elevation: 911 m (2,989 ft)

Population (2001)
  - Total: 93
- Time zone: UTC+1 (CET)
  - Summer (DST): UTC+2 (CEST)
- Postcode: 06043
- Area code: 0743

Ocosce is a frazione of the comune of Cascia in the Province of Perugia, Umbria, central Italy. It stands at an elevation of 911 metres above sea level. At the time of the Istat census of 2001 it had 93 inhabitants.

== Images ==
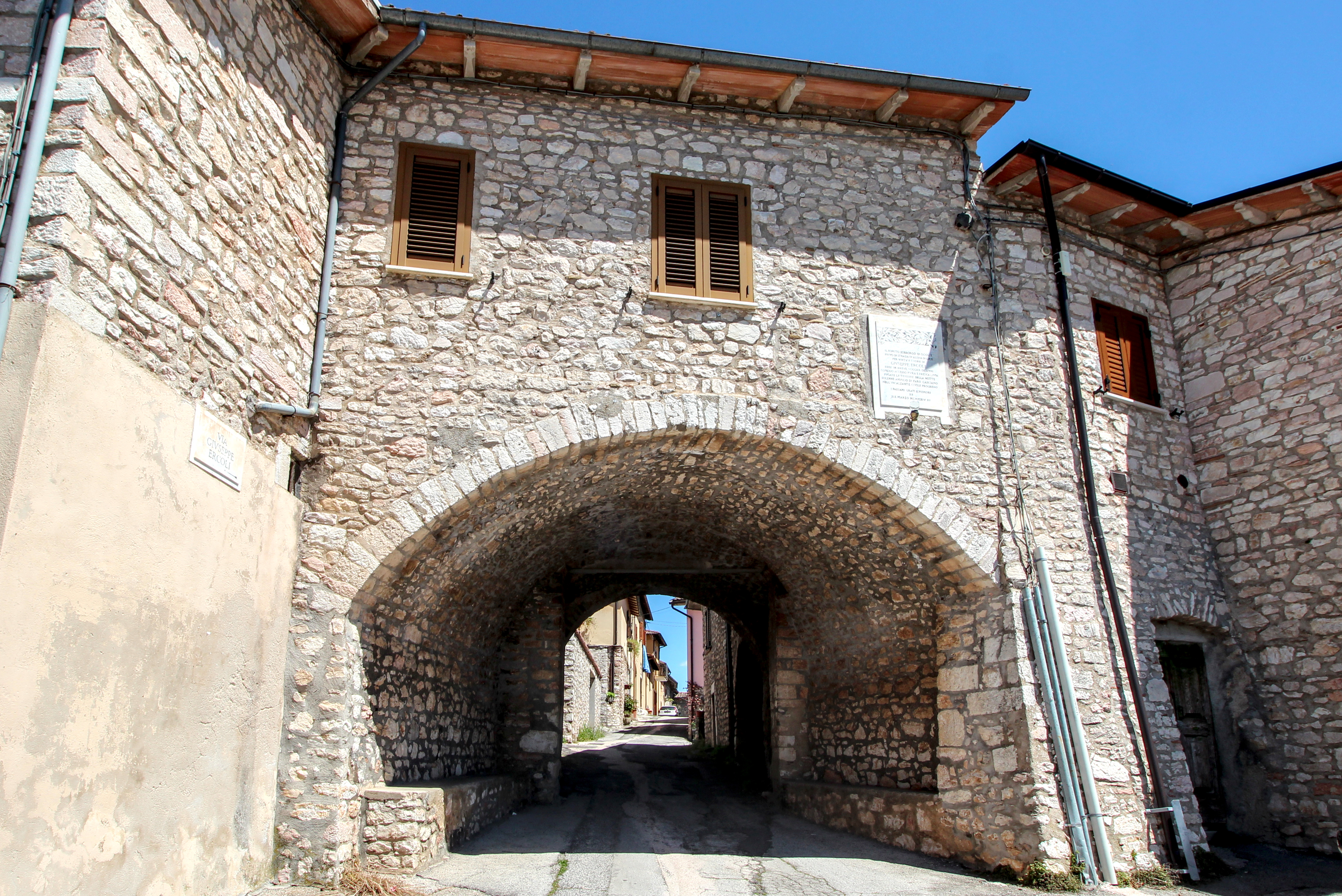
city gate to the town center

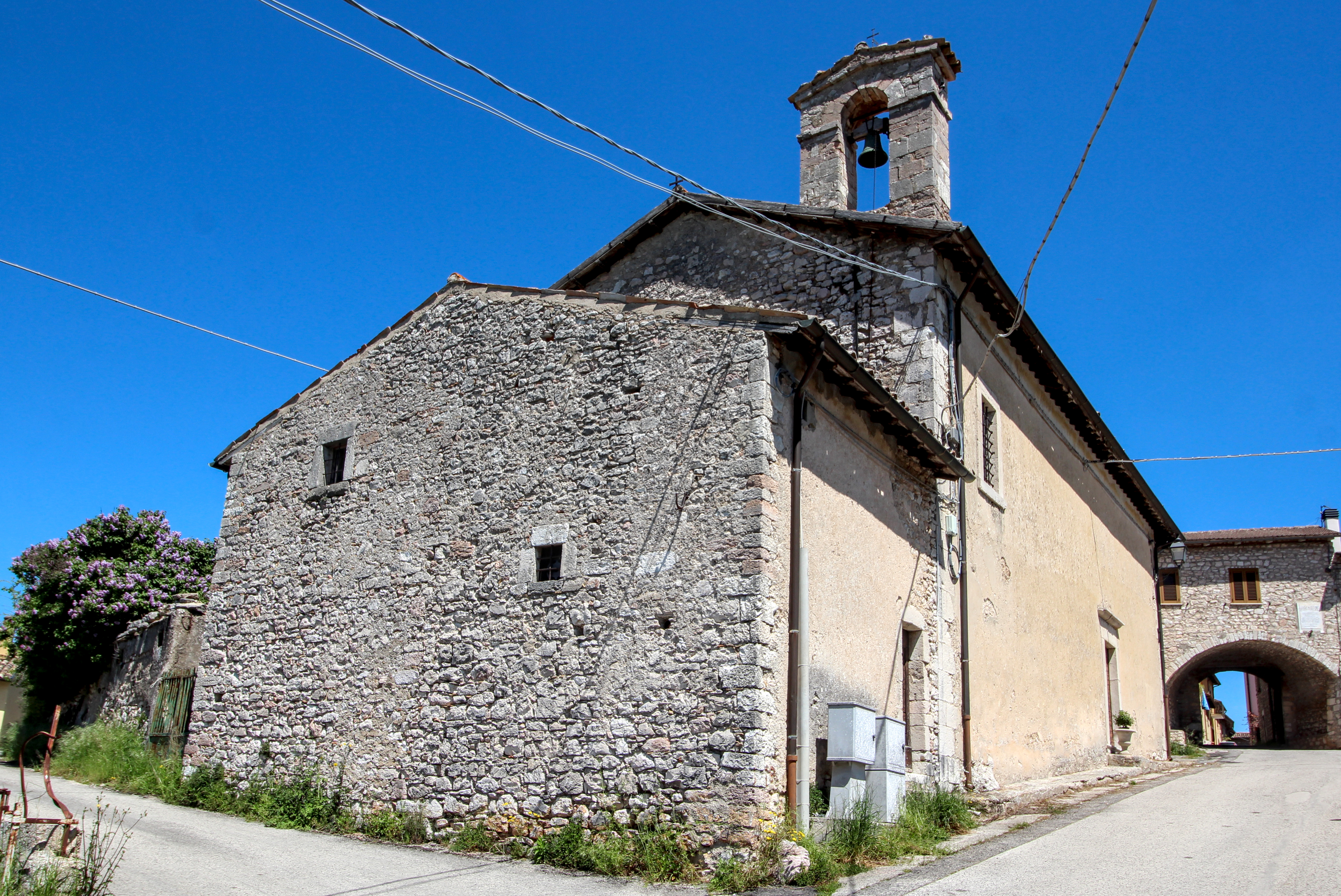
church Sant'Anna outside the walled town

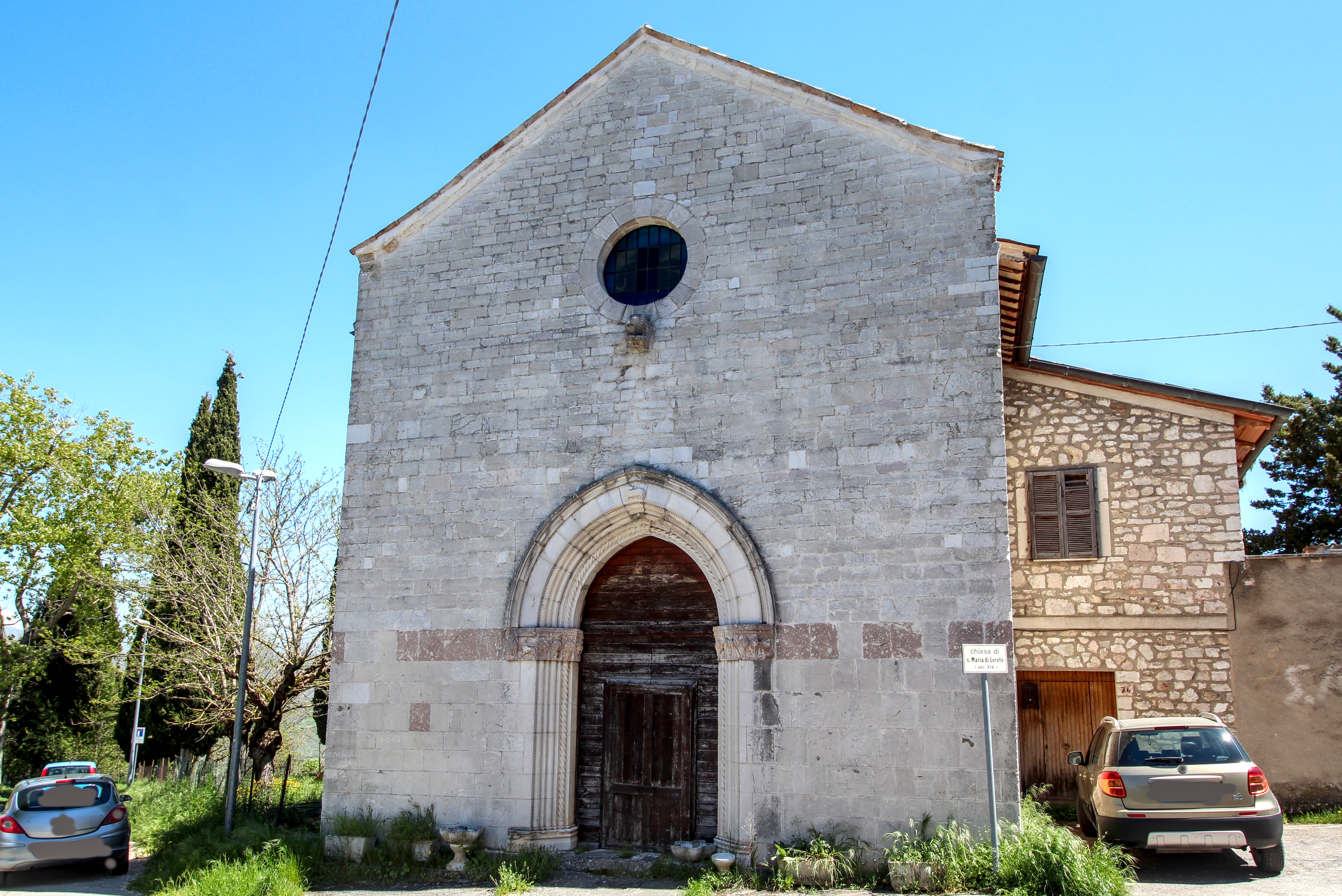
church Madonna di Loreto
