= Cascia =

- Comune
- Comune di Cascia
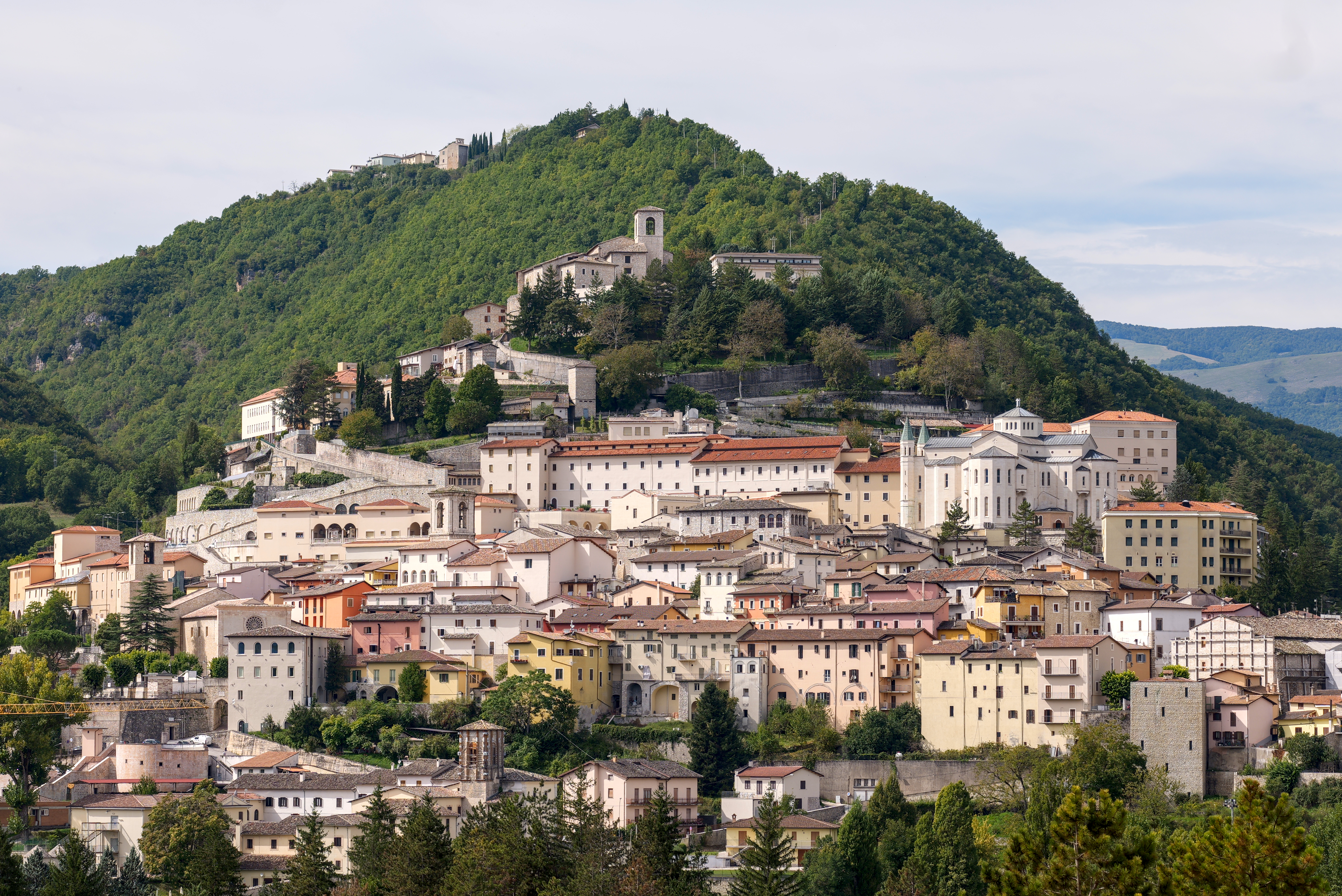
- Cascia

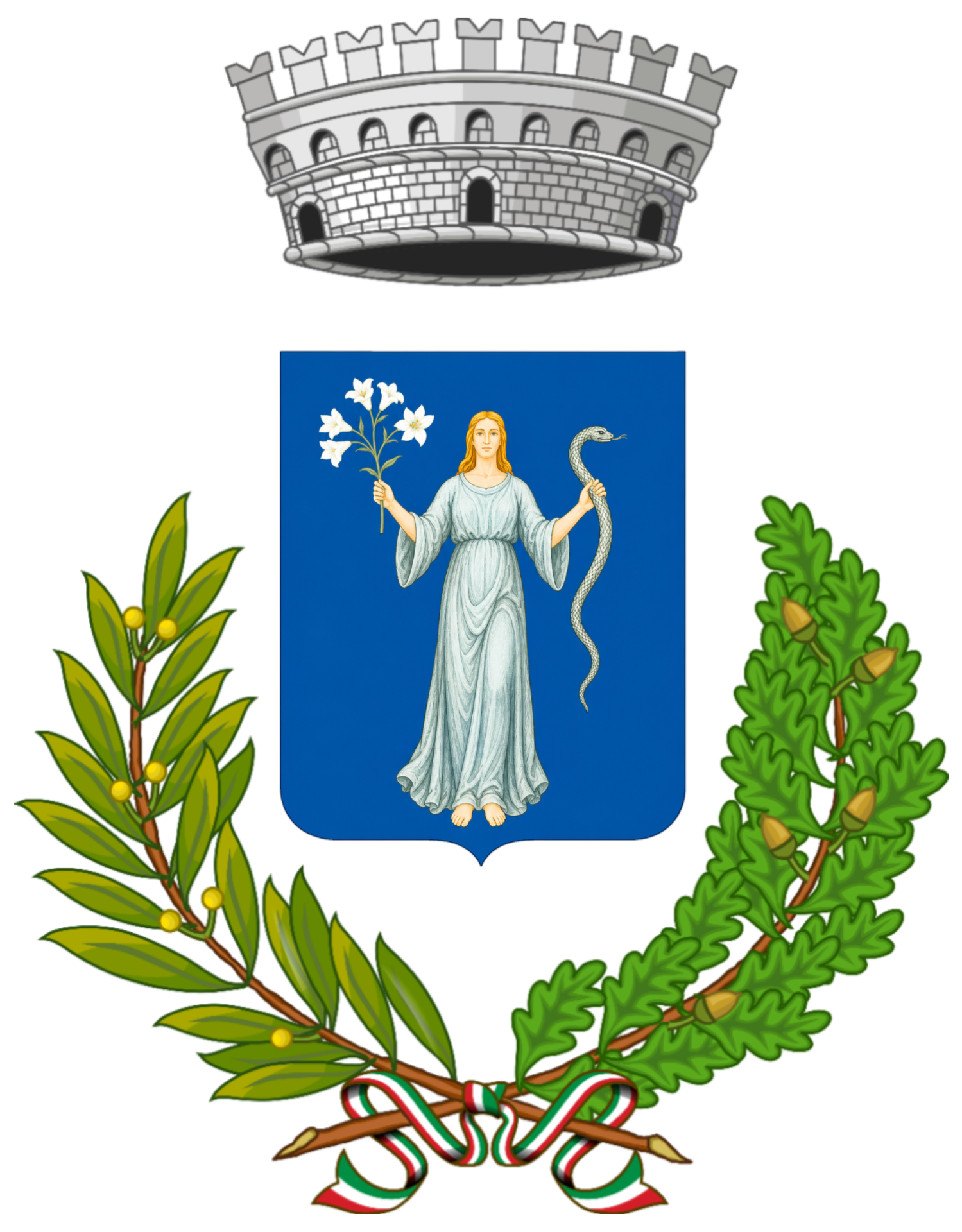
- Coat of arms

- Location within Italy Location within Umbria
- Coordinates: 42.718266°N 13.013566°E
- Country: Italy
- Region: Umbria
- Province: Perugia

Government
  - Mayor: Mario De Carolis

Area
  - Total: 181.09 km^{2} (69.92 sq mi)
- Elevation: 653 m (2,142 ft)

Population (1 January 2025)
  - Total: 2,948
  - Density: 16.28/km^{2} (42.16/sq mi)
- Demonym: Casciani
- Time zone: UTC+1 (CET)
  - Summer (DST): UTC+2 (CEST)
- Postal code: 06043
- Dialing code: 0743
- Patron saint: St. Rita of Cascia
- Saint day: May 22
- Website: Official website

Cascia (Italian pronunciation: [ˈkaʃʃa]) is a town and comune (municipality) of the Italian province of Perugia in a rather remote area of the mountainous southeastern corner of Umbria.

It is about 21 km from Norcia on the road to Rieti in the Lazio (63 km).

== History ==
=== Antiquity ===
Archaeological evidence indicates that the area of Cascia was inhabited from ancient times, as shown by the discovery of hypogeal tombs cut into rock on the left bank of the river Corno, dating to the 2nd century BC and containing various funerary objects.

According to the scholar Theodor Mommsen, the territory of Cascia in antiquity belonged to that of Norcia, and inscriptions referring to municipal institutions found in the area should be attributed to that city.

=== Middle Ages ===
Cascia is mentioned in medieval sources such as the chronicles of Farfa Abbey and of Sassovivo Abbey near Foligno. During the conflicts between Guelphs and Ghibellines, its inhabitants aligned with Pope Alexander IV, and its magistrates bore the title of consuls.

In the Middle Ages Cascia became an independent republic and in a short time brought more than forty surrounding castles under its control. It was governed by its own laws, with a mixed republican and aristocratic system, until 1213, when it submitted to the lordship of the Trinci of Foligno. It later regained its freedom, but in 1260 placed itself under the protection of the Papal States.

During its period of independence, Cascia engaged in numerous conflicts with neighboring communities, including Spoleto, Norcia, Leonessa and Montereale. In 1310 its forces defeated those of Robert, King of Naples.

Disputes with Spoleto over the castle of Treponti were marked by prolonged violence. Efforts to restore peace were made by popes such as Pope Nicholas V and Pope Paul II, the latter ordering the construction of a fortress at Cascia.

The independence of Cascia definitively ended in the 15th century, and an attempt to throw off papal rule in 1517 failed.

=== Modern Era ===
Cascia was granted the title of city by Pope Clement VIII on 6 March 1596.

By the 18th century the town had lost its nominal title of republic.

Cascia was repeatedly struck by earthquakes, notably in 1599 and in 1703, which caused widespread destruction.

In the mid-19th century the town had 4,735 inhabitants. Of these, 4,494 lived in the main settlement, while 241 resided in scattered rural dwellings.

== Geography ==
Cascia is situated in the central Apennines, about 12 kilometres (7.5 mi) south of Norcia, 16 kilometres (9.9 mi) from Leonessa, and 30 miles (48 km) from Spoleto. It lies in a basin enclosed by mountains, at the foot of Monte Corvo (formerly known as Monte Corito).

The town is crossed by the river Corno, whose name derives from the winding course of its bed. The river flows through steep rocky terrain and, after receiving the waters of the Torbidone at Serravalle, joins the Nera below the castle of Triponzo.

The climate is described as variable, with heavy snowfall. The air is subject to strong temperature fluctuations due to the town's elevation. The prevailing wind is from the north-east.

Cascia is built in a mountainous area and has numerous buildings with narrow and steep streets.

=== Subdivisions ===
The municipality includes the localities of Atri, Avendita, Buda, Capanne di Collegiacone, Capanne di Roccaporena, Cascia, Cascine di Opagna, Castel San Giovanni, Castel Santa Maria, Cerasola, Chiavano, Civita, Colforcella, Colle di Avendita, Colle Giacone, Colmotino, Fogliano, Fustagna, Giappiedi, Logna, Maltignano, Manigi, Ocosce, Onelli, Opagna, Padule, Palmaiolo, Piandoli, Poggio Primocaso, Puro, Roccaporena, San Giorgio, Santa Trinità, Sant'Anatolia, Sciedi, Tazzo, Trognano, Valdonica, Villa San Silvestro.

In 2021, 204 people lived in rural dispersed dwellings not assigned to any named locality. At the time, the most populous locality was Cascia proper (1,424).

== Economy ==
Agriculture and animal husbandry formed the basis of the local economy in the late 19th century, with particular mention of truffles, cheese production, and swine farming alongside cereal cultivation and woodland resources. The local economy was limited, including a wool hat manufactory as its principal industry.

== Religion and culture ==
=== Basilica of Santa Rita da Cascia ===
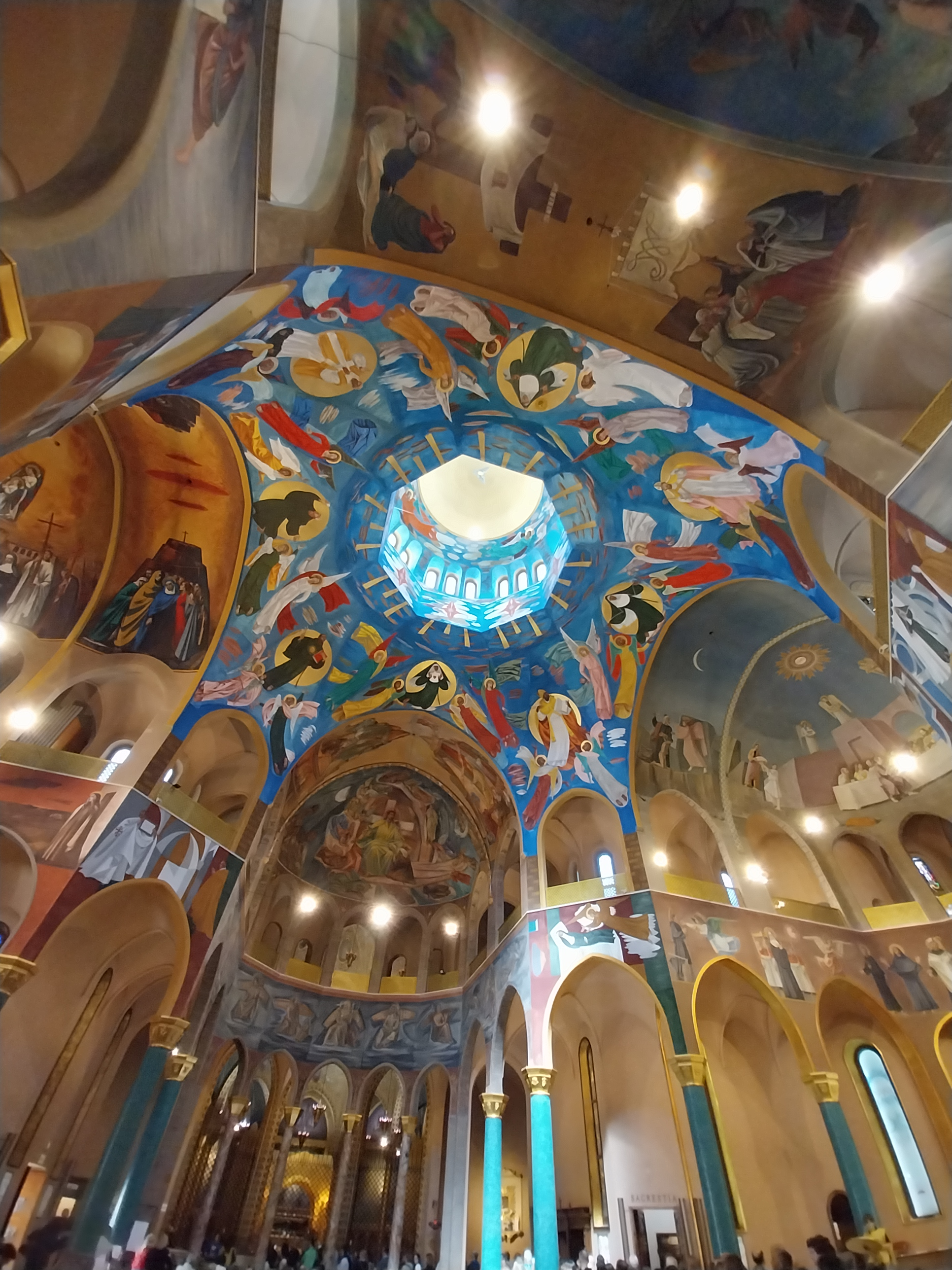
The domed ceiling and painted vaults of the Sanctuary of Santa Rita

The Sanctuary of Santa Rita stands in the highest part of the inhabited center of Cascia, where it breaks with the surrounding architectural scale and style. A 20th-century structure, the sanctuary was built between 1937 and 1947 on the site of the former Augustinian church attached to the monastery where Saint Rita died in 1457. The project was designed by Spirito Maria Chiappetta and later modified during construction by Giuseppe Martinenghi.

The building has a Greek cross plan with apsidal arms and a structure is Byzantine in character, with galleries opening around the perimeter. The high altar, designed by Martinenghi, is decorated with reliefs of the Last Supper by Eros Pellini. The furnishings include works by Giacomo Manzù, including the tabernacle and crucifix.

In the chapel of Saint Rita, behind a wrought-iron grille, a crystal urn dated 1930 contains the body of the saint. Beneath the altar of the Chapel of Consolation is preserved the body of Blessed Simone Fidati (1295–1348). The sanctuary also preserves a small 18th-century painting of the Madonna of Good Counsel.

Adjacent to the sanctuary is the former church of the Blessed Rita, where the body of the saint was venerated from 1577 to 1947; only the portal and some altars remain after partial demolition. According to 19th-century sources, the church housed at its high altar an oil painting of the Virgin holding the body of Christ, signed by Antonio Carocci of Preci, while the frontal was made of embossed 17th-century silver, featuring an embroidered depiction of Saint Rita holding a crucifix.

=== Church of San Francesco ===
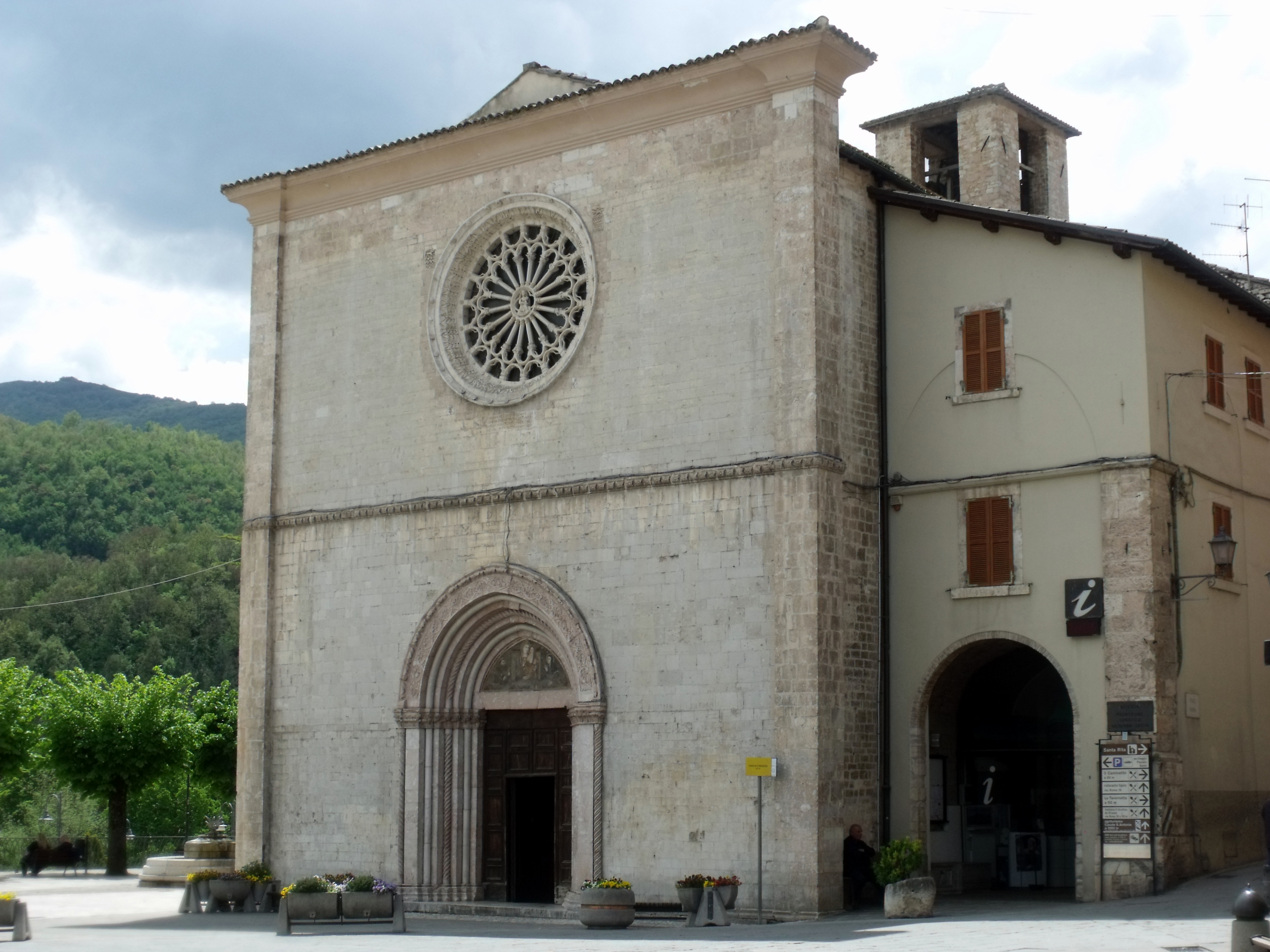
Facade of the Church of San Francesco, showing its prominent rose window and limestone construction

The Church of San Francesco was founded in 1247. In 1270 the Franciscan Blessed Pace was buried there, and in 1291 Pope Nicholas IV granted indulgences to the original Romanesque church, of which remains survive including portions of walls, a bifora window, and the portal.

The present church was built between 1339 and 1424 by Antonio Elemosina of Cascia, bishop of Nebbio. The façade features a rose window composed of trilobed arches and small columns radiating from a central quadrilobe with an image of the Virgin and Child, and a splayed portal with multiple columns supporting a pointed arch, accompanied by an inscription bearing a 15th-century date and the name of the patron.

The interior has a Latin cross plan. The original ribbed vaults were replaced by a truss roof after damage caused by the earthquake of 1703. Along the nave are altars, including those dedicated to the Conception and to Saint Rita, and a painting depicting Saint Bartholomew, Saint Peter, and Saint Paul. In the transept is an altarpiece dating to the late 16th century, with a central panel of the Ascension by Pomarancio and side paintings attributed to Guido Reni and Perino Cesarei. Another large painting depicts Christ with the Virgin and angels appearing to Saint Francis.

=== Church of Santa Maria ===
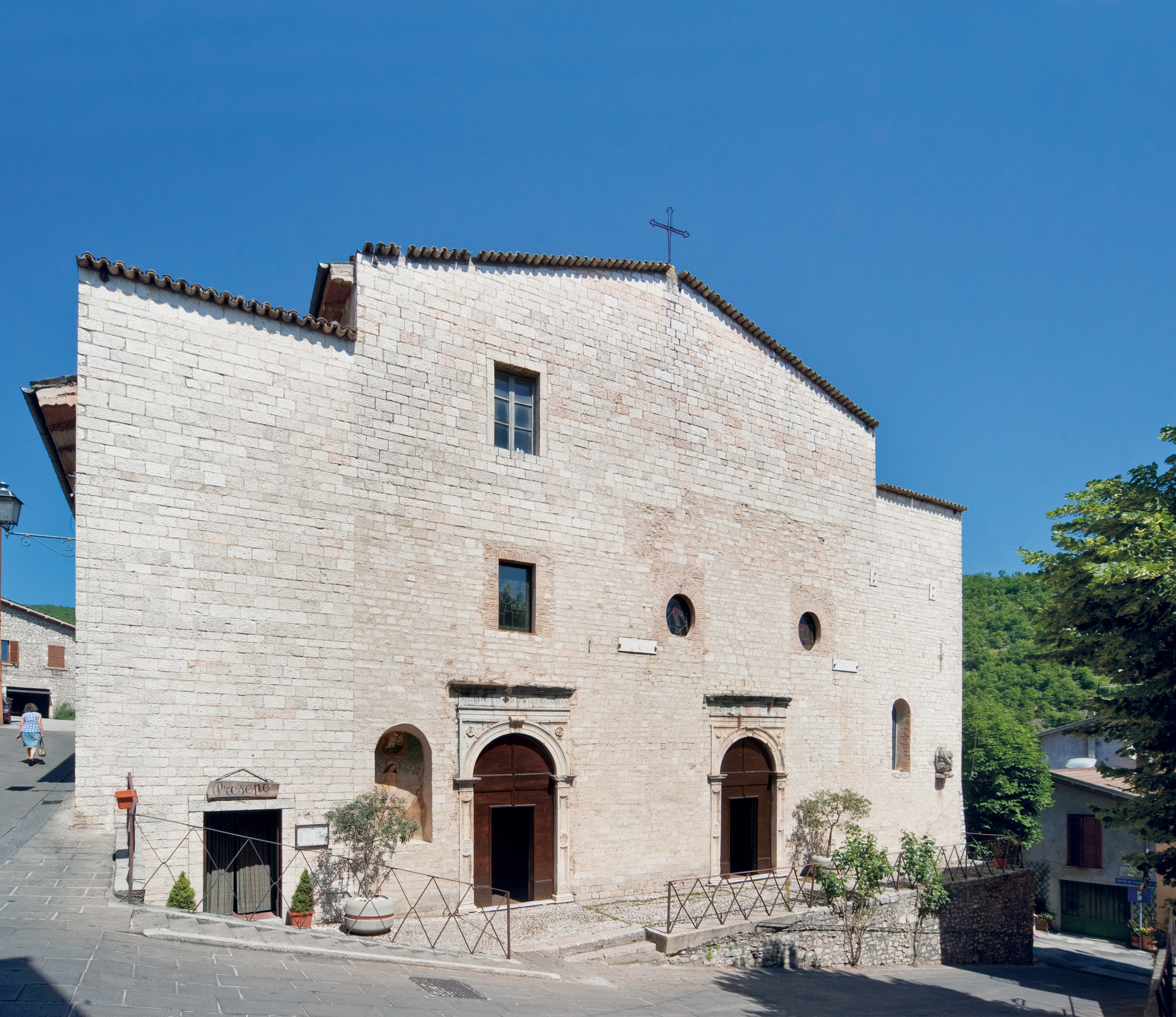
Church of Santa Maria

The collegiate church of Santa Maria is located within the walled area of Cascia, near Porta Leonina. It was founded in the 12th century, with remains of the original Romanesque structure preserved in the north wall. It was later rebuilt in Gothic style and again in 1532.

The façade, ending in a tympanum, includes two portals dated 1535 and 1621, a niche with a 16th-century fresco depicting Saint Sebastian and the Madonna della Quercia, and a stone lion from an earlier structure. The interior has three naves with ribbed vaults and a 16th-century layout, with wooden and polychrome stucco altars dating from the 16th and 18th centuries.

Works in the church include a Deposition by Nicola da Siena and a 15th-century Nativity. In the right nave are paintings including the Pace dei Casciani by Gaspare and Camillo Angelucci, and depictions of Saint Anne, Saint Leonard, Saint Nicholas, and the Madonna del Soccorso, as well as frescoes of the Stories of Saint Charles and a Madonna with Child. In the left nave are the Mysteries of the Rosary by Niccolò Frangipane (1538). The baptismal font is associated by tradition with the baptism of Saint Rita in 1381.

Marble monuments with mosaic portraits of Cardinal Fausto Poli and Paolo Frenfanelli date to 1642. The organ features carved decoration from the 16th century.

=== Church and convent of Sant'Antonio Abate ===
The town also is home to the frescoed 14th-century church of Sant’Antonio Abate.

In the apse are frescoes depicting the Evangelists and the Virgin enthroned with the Child, attributed to Domenico di Giacomo da Leonessa. In the adjoining convent, frescoes at the foot of the staircase represent Saint Michael the Archangel, while in the choir further paintings illustrate episodes from the life of Christ, including the Crucifixion, the Crowning with Thorns, and Calvary. These works are attributed to Nicola da Siena.

=== Sanctuary of Santa Maria della Neve ===
Located at Castel Santa Maria, this church, dating to 1571, is described as an important architectural work executed to a design attributed to Bramante.

=== Other religious buildings ===
Cascia is associated with several sites of artistic and devotional significance in its surrounding territory, including small churches decorated with frescoes and the reuse of ancient Roman elements within later religious structures.

At Colle Giocondo, the Church of the Capanne is decorated with numerous votive frescoes of the Umbrian school.

At Colle Santo Stefano, the church of the same name preserves a Roman altar, decorated with festoons and bucrania, reused as a baptismal font.

At Poggio Primocaso, the Church of San Fortunato contains a painting of the meeting of the Three Marys with Christ, as well as a work recalling the style of Cavalier d'Arpino.

At Roccaporena, the birthplace of Saint Rita was transformed into a chapel and contains a painting of the saint attributed to Luca Giordano.

== Notable people ==
Cascia is also associated with Saint Rita, who was born in the frazione of Roccaporena.

Vespasia Polla, mother of the emperor Vespasian, was born in the territory of Cascia at a place called Vespiae. Among other notable figures are the Blessed Simone Fidati; the venerable Andrea da Cascia, a preacher martyred in Fez in 1300.

Later figures include Cardinal Fausto Poli and his nephew Gaudenzio, bishop of Amelia. Military figures include Agostino Negroni, Paolo Frenfanelli, who served as a general of the papal forces, and Stefano Squarciapani, a general of the Republic of Venice. Among 19th century figures is Lorenzo Franceschini, a jurist and professor of civil law in Rome, who also served as a member of parliament.

Among other figures associated with the town are the prelate Giuseppe Cruciani, master of the household to Pope Alexander VII.

In the mid-19th century the principal families of Cascia included those of Stefano Maria Franceschini, Costanzo Bucchi, Lodovico Franceschini, Giovanni Battista Frenfranelli, Carlo Travaglini, Giuseppe Paoloni, and Raffaele Cittadoni.
