= Fogliano, Cascia =

Fogliano
- Frazione
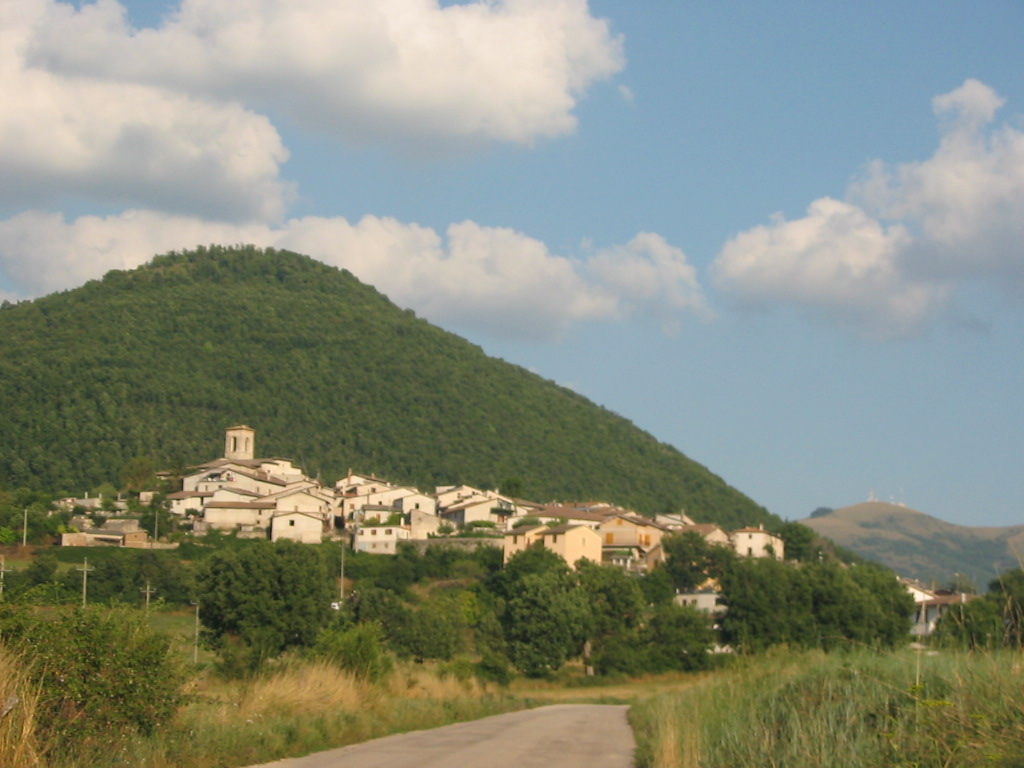
- Fogliano

- Location within Italy
- Coordinates: 42°44′02″N 13°02′47″E
- Country: Italy
- Region: Umbria
- Province: Perugia
- Comune: Cascia
- Elevation: 827 m (2,713 ft)

Population (2001)
  - Total: 119
- Time zone: UTC+1 (CET)
  - Summer (DST): UTC+2 (CEST)
- Postcode: 06043
- Area code: 0743

Fogliano is a frazione of the comune of Cascia in the Province of Perugia, Umbria, central Italy. It stands at an elevation of 827 metres above sea level. At the time of the Istat census of 2001 it had 119 inhabitants.
