= Civita, Cascia =

Civita
- Frazione
- Location within Italy
- Coordinates: 42°40′24″N 13°07′16″E
- Country: Italy
- Region: Umbria
- Province: Perugia
- Comune: Cascia
- Elevation: 1,171 m (3,842 ft)

Population (2001)
  - Total: 58
- Time zone: UTC+1 (CET)
  - Summer (DST): UTC+2 (CEST)
- Postcode: 06043
- Area code: 0743

Civita is a frazione of the comune of Cascia in the Province of Perugia, Umbria, central Italy. It stands at an elevation of 1171 metres above sea level. At the time of the Istat census of 2001 it had 58 inhabitants.
