= Colle Giacone =

- Frazione
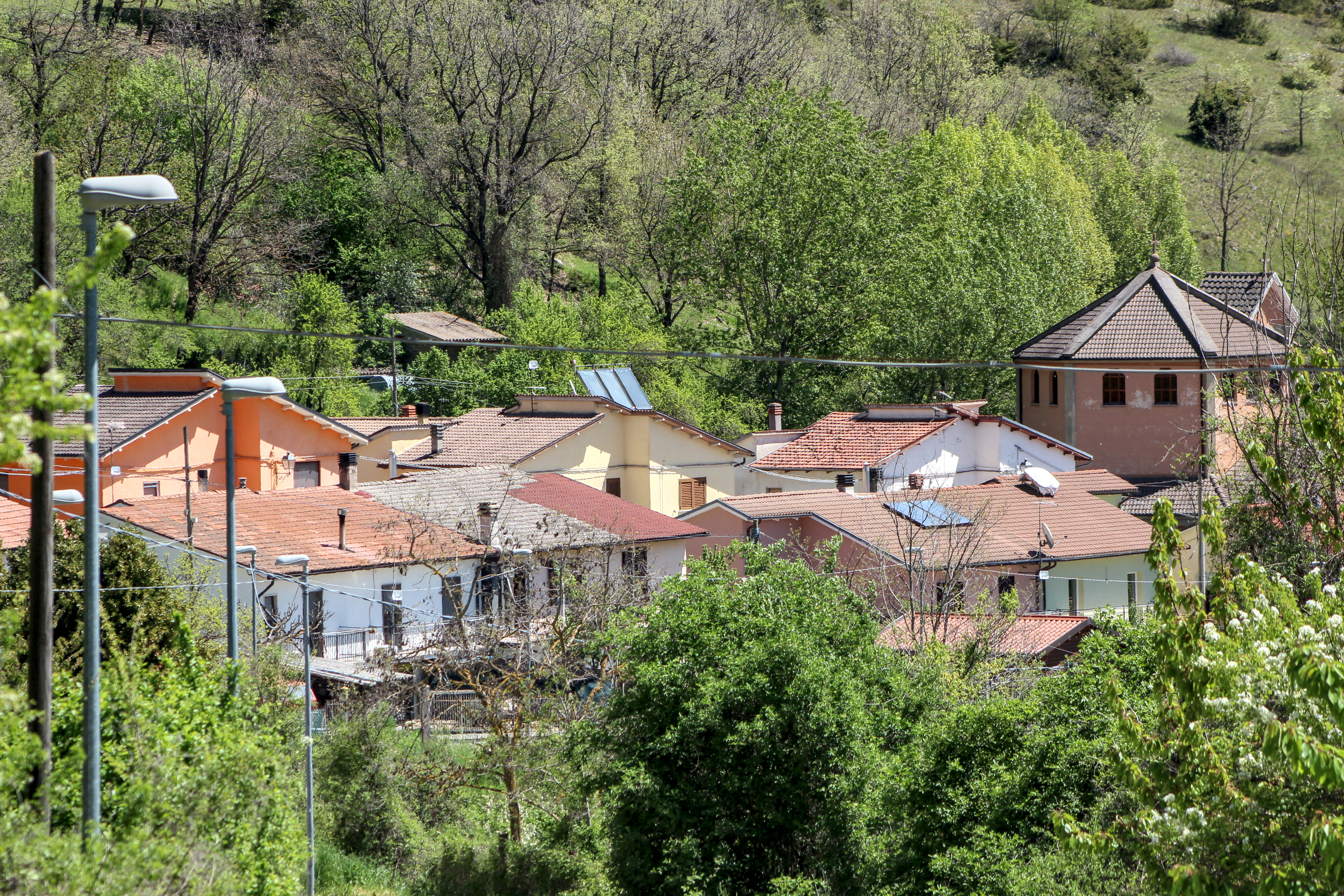
- Colle Giacone

- Location within Italy
- Coordinates: 42°43′43″N 12°58′53″E
- Country: Italy
- Region: Umbria
- Province: Perugia
- Comune: Cascia
- Elevation: 975 m (3,199 ft)

Population (2001)
  - Total: 72
- Time zone: UTC+1 (CET)
  - Summer (DST): UTC+2 (CEST)
- Postcode: 06043
- Area code: 0743

Colle Giacone (also: Collegiacone) is a frazione of the comune of Cascia in the Province of Perugia, Umbria, central Italy.

== Geography ==
It stands at an elevation of 975 metres (3,199 ft) above sea level. At the time of the Istat census of 2001 it had 72 inhabitants.

== Images ==
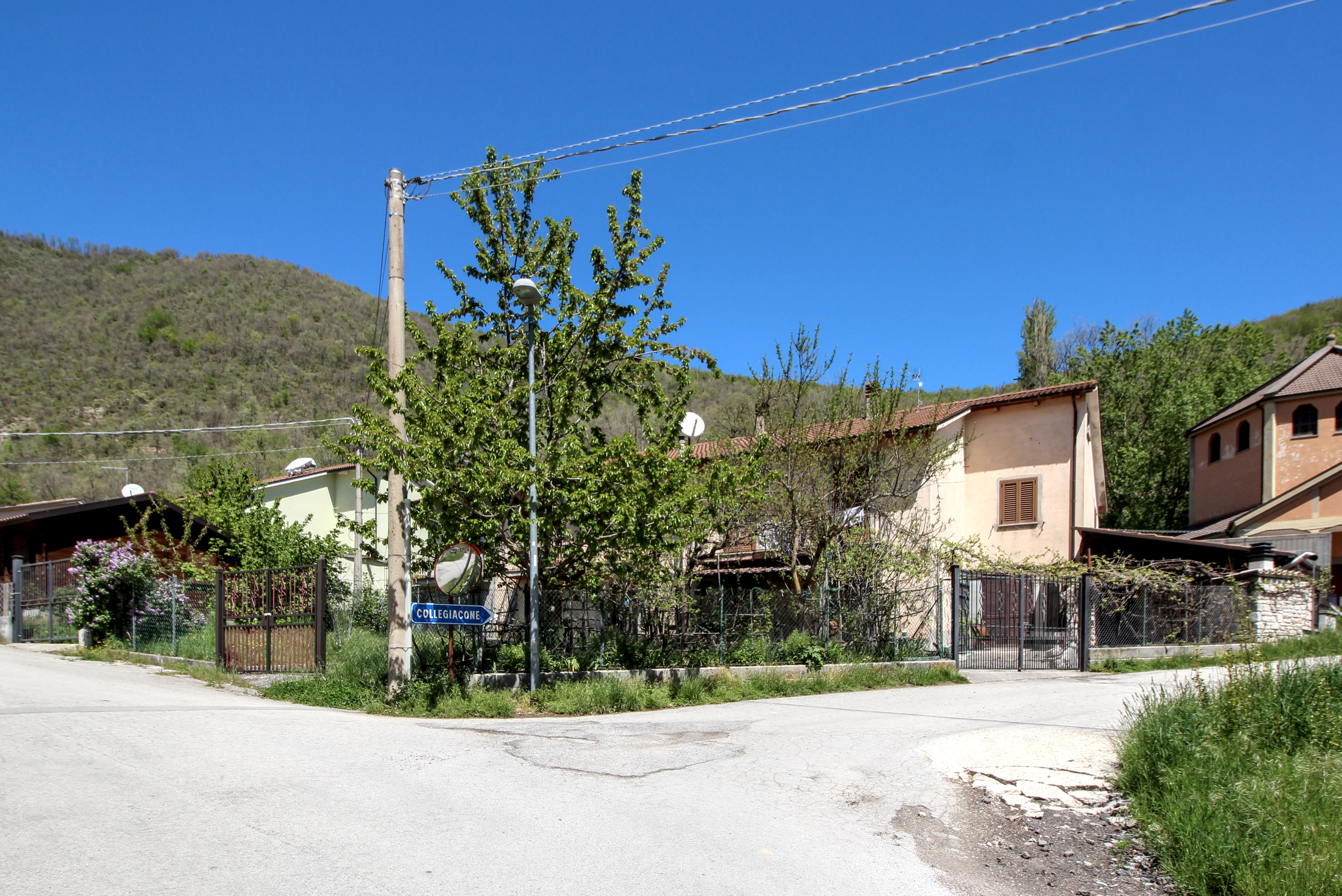
village view of Colle Giacone

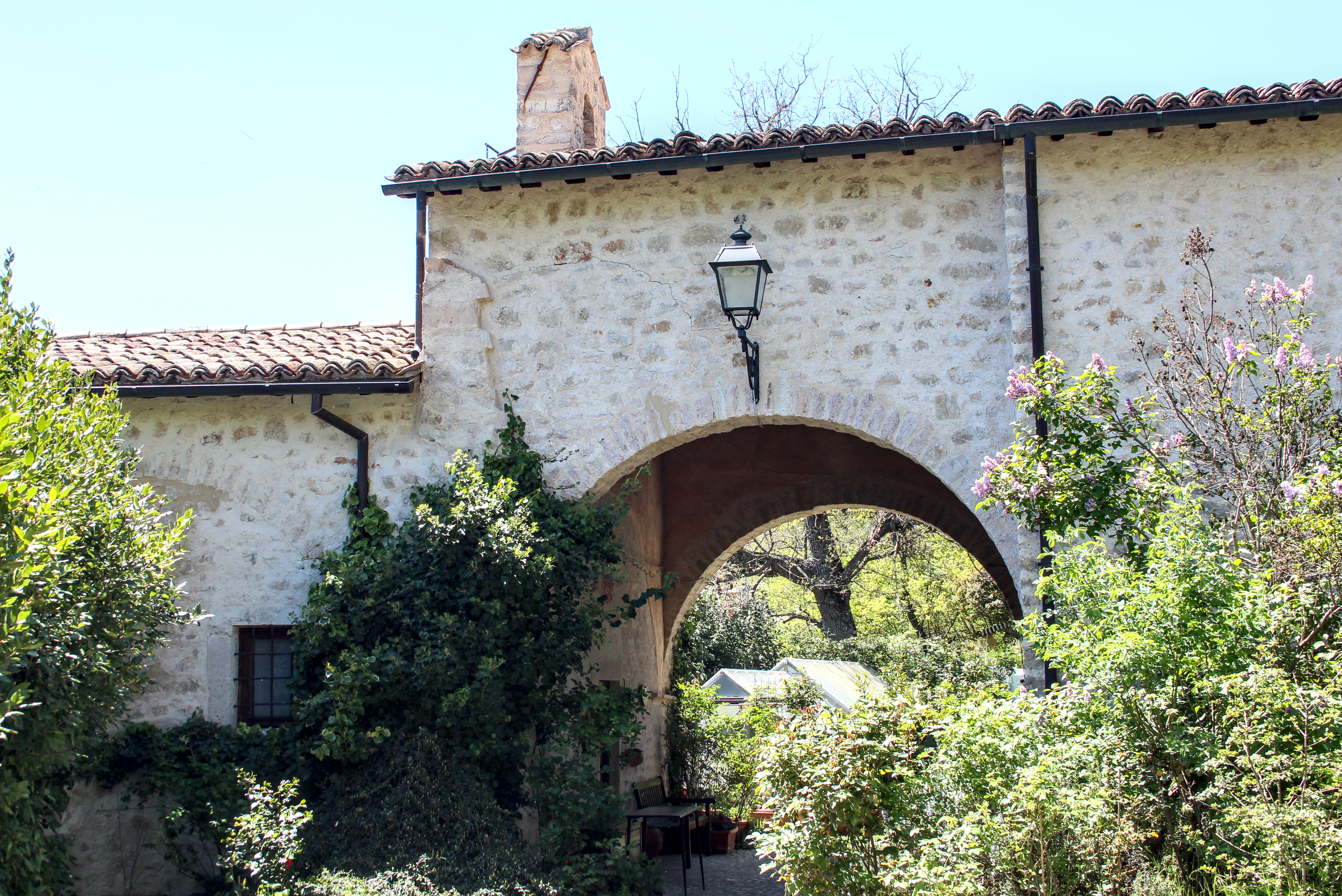
church Santa Maria Apparente

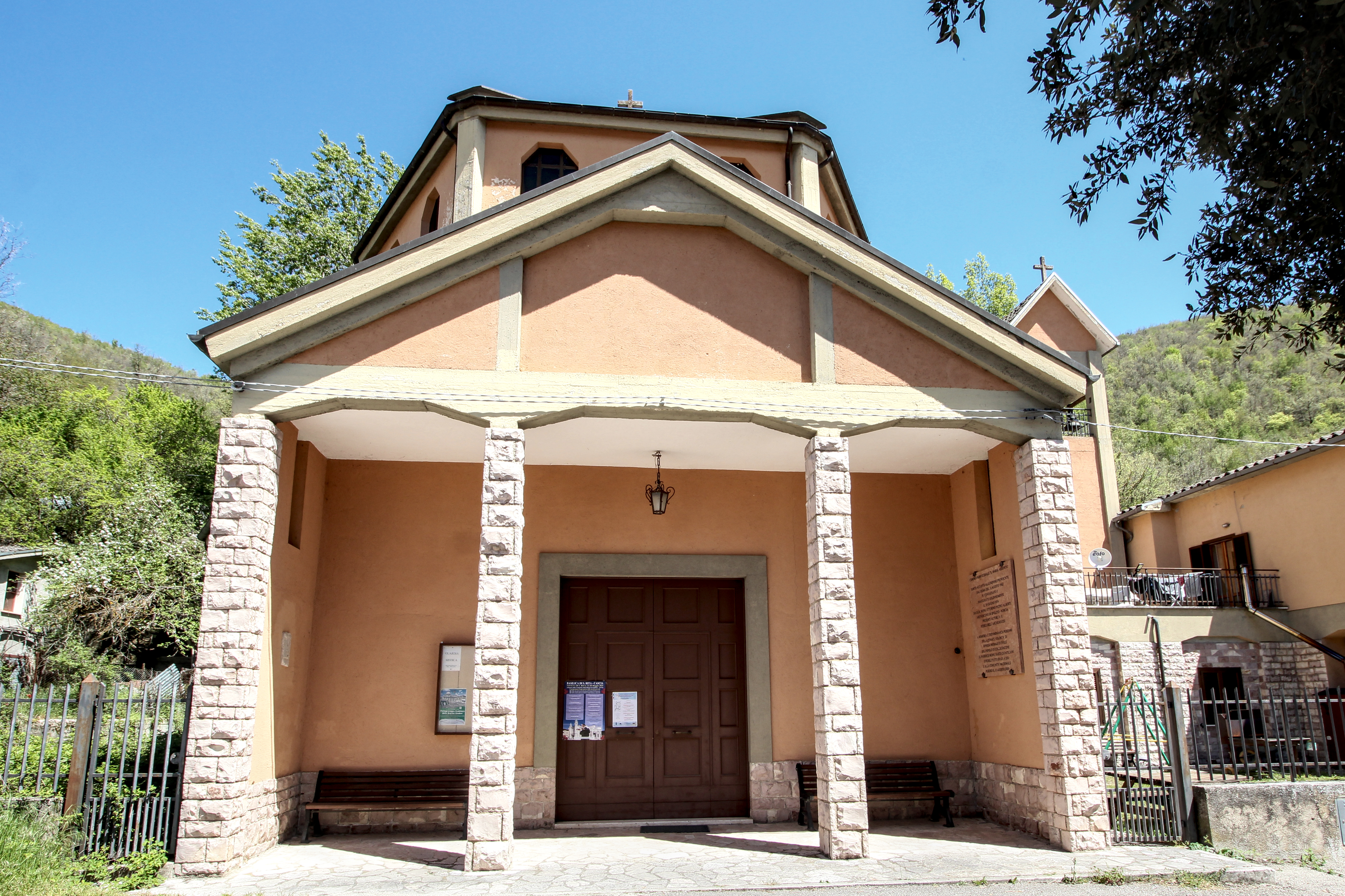
facade of the church Santa Maria Assunta

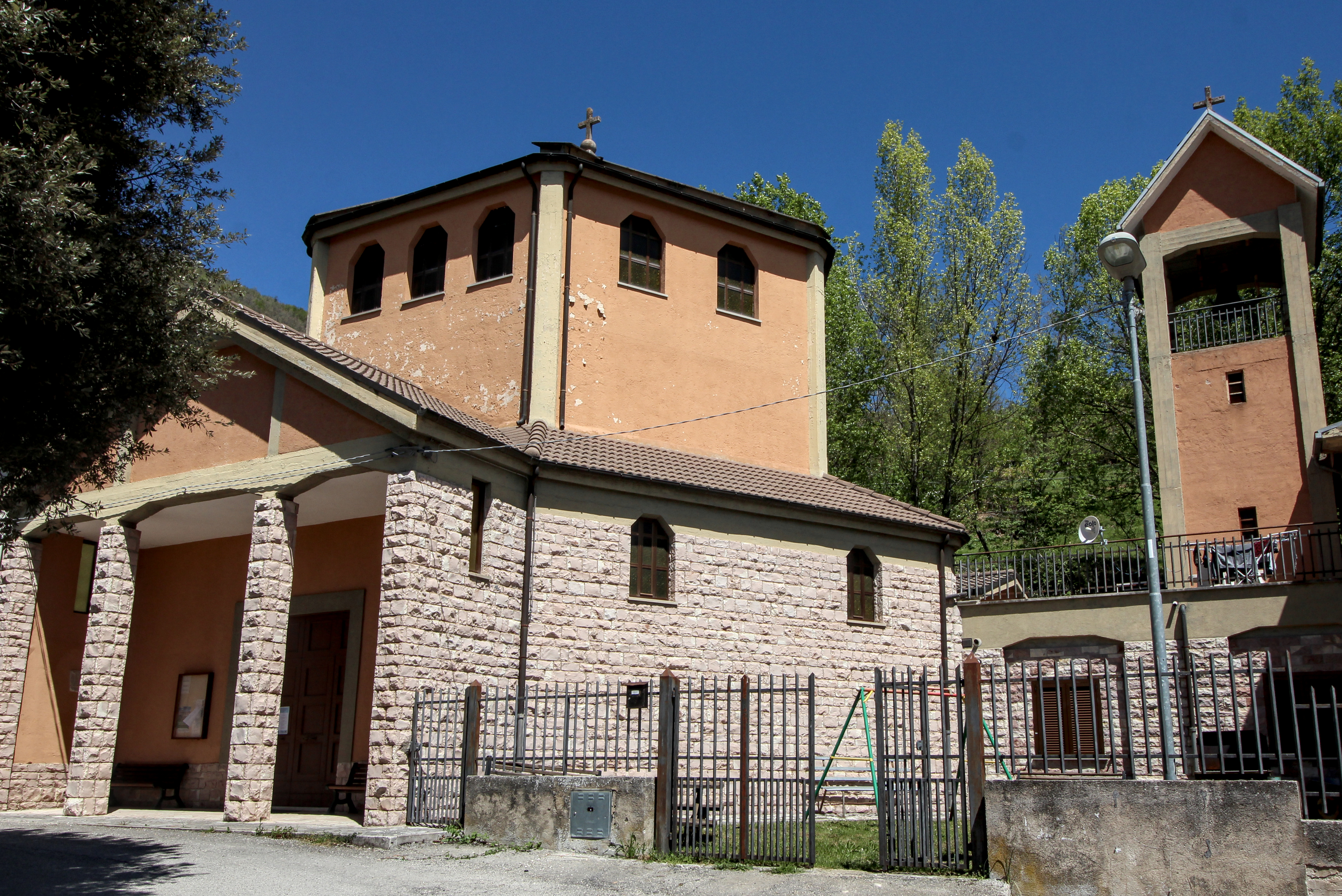
church Santa Maria Assunta
