= Fogliano, Siena =

Fogliano
- Frazione
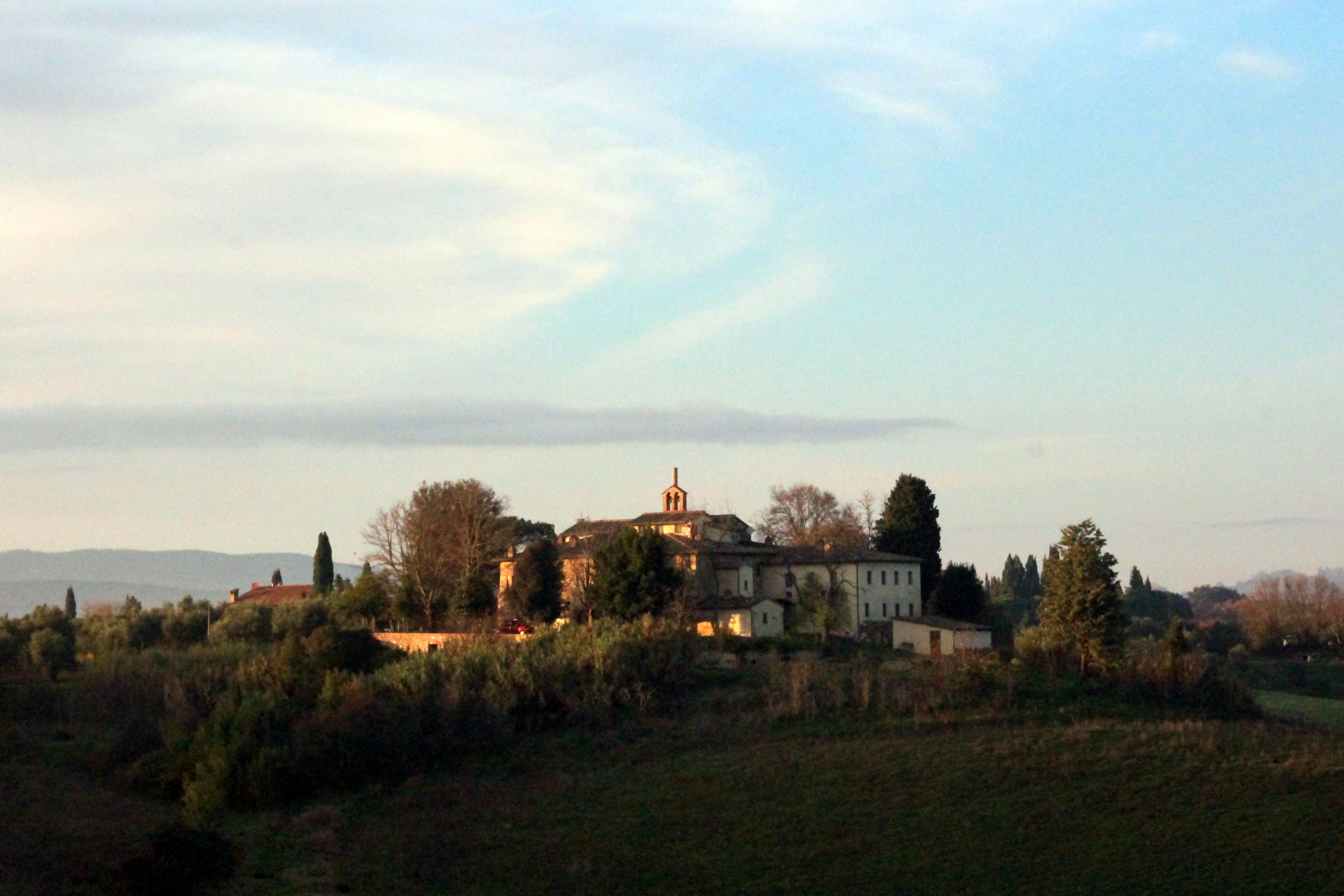
- View of Fogliano

- Location of Fogliano in Italy
- Coordinates: 43°15′48″N 11°18′28″E
- Country: Italy
- Region: Tuscany
- Province: Siena (SI)
- Comune: Siena
- Elevation: 239 m (784 ft)

Population (2011)
  - Total: 66
- Time zone: UTC+1 (CET)
  - Summer (DST): UTC+2 (CEST)

Fogliano is a village in Tuscany, central Italy, in the comune of Siena, province of Siena. At the time of the 2011 census its population was 66.

Fogliano is about 10 km from Siena.
