= List of subdivisions of the department of Trasimène =

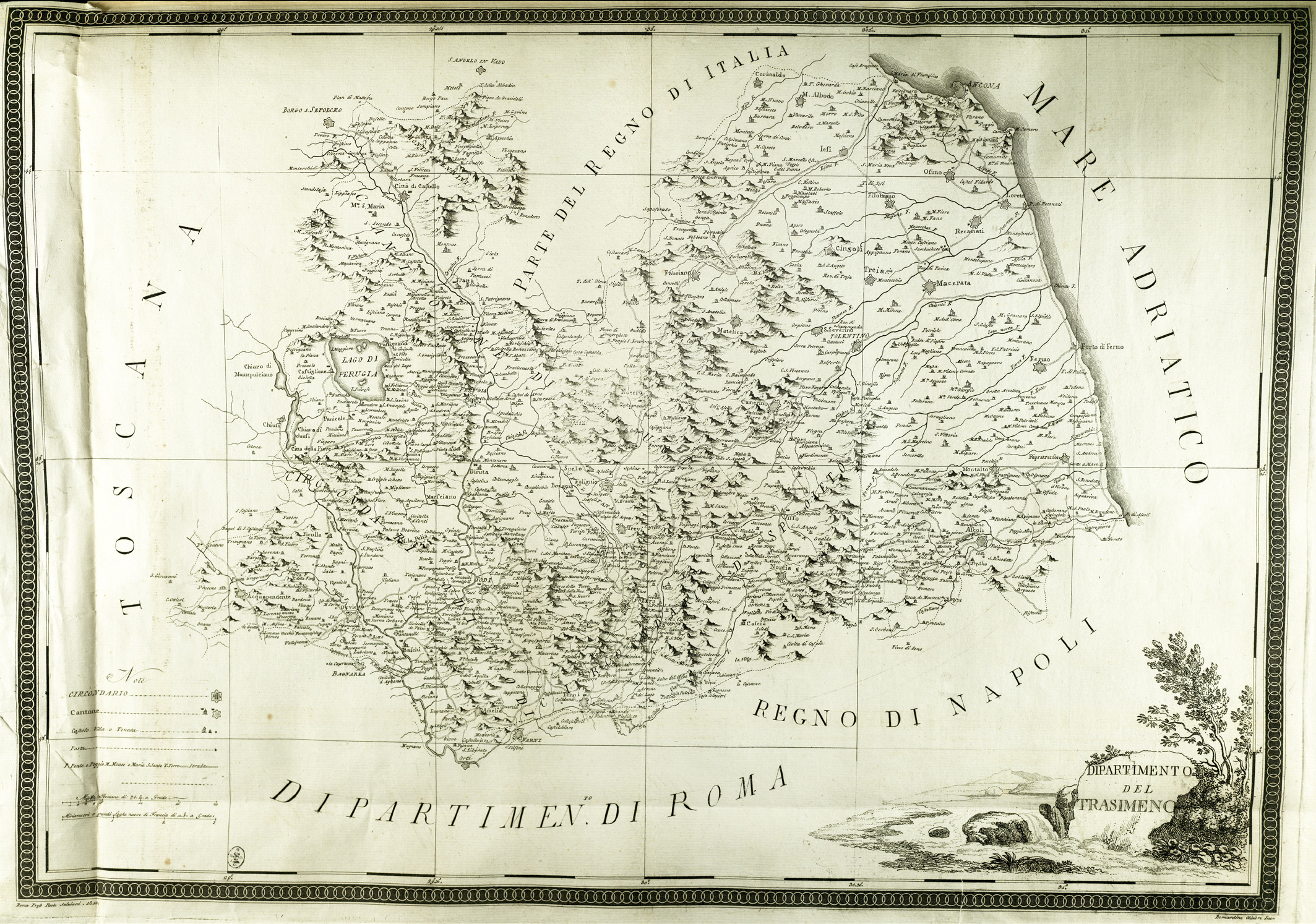
1810 map of the department of Trasimène

List of subdivisions of the department of Trasimène is a list of the arrondissements, cantons and localities that made up the Trasimène department in the First French Empire between 1809 and 1814.

The department was created after the annexation of the Papal States in 1809, with its capital at Spoleto.

== List ==
=== Arrondissement of Spoleto ===
==== Canton of Spoleto (urban) ====
- Commune of Spoleto: San Venanzano, Campagnano, San Angelo in Merola, Bazzano di Sopra, Rocca Berardesca, Bazzano di Sotto, Sambrizio, Bajano, Le Cese, Santa Croce, Colle, Risciano, Eggi, Cero, San Giuliano, Porella, Valli, Majano, Morro, Morgnano, Pincano, San Renzano, Pompagnano, Agliano, Migiana, Patrico, Mustajola, Prutte, Poreta, Perchia, Sciano, Rabbiano, Monte li Rossi, San Silvestro, Sustrico, San Sabino, Frignano, San Martino, Ferraja, Poggiolo, Valdarena, Vallocchi, Borgiano, Matrignano, Senasti, Rajischio, San Angelo in Valle
- Commune of Azzano: San Beroide, San Giacomo

==== Canton of Spoleto (rural) ====
- Commune of Scheggino: Ceselli, Civitella, Monte San Vito, Gavelli, Caso, Sant'Anatolia, Agelli
- Commune of Vallo: Castel San Felice, Grotti, Piedi Paterno, Meggiano, Geppa, Paterno
- Commune of Terzo San Severo: Roselli, San Gregorio, Coste, Scoppio, Monte Mortano, Terzo della Pieve, Uncinano
- Commune of Villa Paganica: Mogliano, Rapicciano, Balduini, Sterpeto, Colle, Campo, Porziano, Macerino, Fiorenzolo, Citerna, Arezzo, Palazzo, Messenano, Poggio, Lavarino, Trogliano
- Commune of Strettura: Ancajano, Acqua la Castagna, Monte Biscio, Valle San Martino, Acqua Giura, Fornole, Castagna Cupa, Catinelli, Cerqueto
- Commune of Ferentillo: Borzino, Monte Rivose, Castellone, Mannano, San Mavigliano, Loreno, Agabbio, Niciano
- Commune of Campello: Bianca, Le Vene, Le Nane, Pissignano, Silvignano, Pianciano
- Commune of Acera: Spina, Apagni, Fondi, Agliano, Postignano
- Commune of Sellano: Forfi, Vio, Ottagi, San Martino, Villa Maggiore, Pupaggi, Sterpara

==== Canton of Terni (urban) ====
- Commune of Terni: Acqua Palombo, Appuano, Battiferro, Ceccalocco, Colle Licino, La Rocca

==== Canton of Terni (rural) ====
- Commune of Capitone
- Commune of Cesi: Poggio Azzuano
- Commune of San Gemini
- Commune of Papigno
- Commune of Acqua Sparta
- Commune of Portaria
- Commune of Arrone
- Commune of Polino
- Commune of Montefranco
- Commune of Torre Orsina
- Commune of Castel di Lago
- Commune of Colle Statte

==== Canton of Cascia ====
- Commune of Cascia: Avendita in Terra, Castel San Giovanni, Cerasola, Colle di Avendita, Col Forcella, Colle Giasone, Colmattino, Colle San Stefano, Fogliano, Giappiedi, Logna, Maltignano, Manigi, Poggio Primocaso, Piandoli, Puro, Nortosce, Onelli, Rocca, Porena, Rocchetta, Sant'Anatolia, San Giorgio, Santissima Trinità, Tasso
- Commune of Poggio Domo: Rocca Tamburo, Muccia Fuori, Usigni
- Commune of Civita: Coronella, Trimezzo, Trognano, Villa San Silvestro, Buda, Chivanno, Aupagna, Cascina
- Commune of Monteleone: Ruscio, Trivio, Butina

==== Canton of Norcia ====
- Commune of Norcia: San Pellegrina, Serravalle, Forsivo, Biselli, Castelluccio, Agentili, Agriano, Campi, Ancarano, Ospedale, Piè di Ripa, Cortigno, Aliena, Popoli, Belvedere
- Commune of San Marco: Pesce, Sant'Andrea, Frascaro, Savelli, Paganelli, Valcadora, Nuttoria, Ogricchio, Santa Maria
- Commune of Preci: Abeto, Fodiano, Poggio di Groce, Monte Bufo, Collazzone, Montaglioni, Rocca Nolfi, Villarella

==== Canton of Arquata ====
- Commune of Arquata: Borgo, Camertina, Vezzano, Pescara, Paè di Lama, Pretara
- Commune of Trisungo: Faeti, Aspelonga, Colle

==== Canton of Visso ====
- Commune of Visso: Aschio, Villa San Antonio, Cupi, Visso, Vallopa, Croce, Fematre
- Commune of Castelvecchio: Saccoveccíe, Orvano, Corone, Collescile, Aquaro, Visso, Valle, Villa Piè di Valle
- Commune of Castel Sant'Angelo: Gualdo, Valle Infante, Nocelleto, Rapegna, Macchie, Nocria, San Placido
- Commune of Pieve: Calcara, Vallaza, Casali, Valle Stretta, Sasso, Tempori, Staminate, Sorbo, Castel Fontellino
- Commune of Monte Santo: Chiusita, Rosenna, Rio Freddo, Meale, Belforte

=== Arrondissement of Perugia ===
==== Canton of Perugia (urban) ====
- Commune of Perugia: Prepo, Pretola, Villagemini, Casaglia, San Marco, Santa Lucia, Monte Corneo, Boneggio, Piscile, San Proteo, Casa Manza, Pieve di Campo, Ponte San Giovanni, Fontana, Ponte Felcino, San Fortunato, San Martino del Fico, San Sisto, Santa Maria Cenerente, Rabbate, Ponte Val di Ceppi, Santa Maria in Colle, San Costanzo, San Faustino, Santa Petronilla

==== Canton of Perugia (rural 1) ====
- Commune of Corciano: Capo Cavallo, Montignano, Migiana, Pieve del Vescovo, Castelvieto, San Mariano, Chiugiana, Sant'Andrea delle Fratte, Lacugnano
- Commune of Mugnano: Agello, Solomeo, Mandoleto, San Martino, Poggio della Corte, Pieve Caina, (S.)Apollinare
- Commune of Spina: Castel del Piano, Castiglione della Valle, San Biagio della Valle, Pila, Bagnaja
- Commune of San Angelo di Celle: Castel delle Forme, Sant'Elena, Papiano, Cerqueto
- Commune of Sant'Enea: Badajoli (Badiola), Villanova, Olmeto, San Martino in Colle, San Valentino, San Niccolò di Celle, Agliano, San Martino in Campo

==== Canton of Perugia (rural 2) ====
- Commune of Torgiano: Colle della Strada, Spedalicchio, Brufa, Miserduolo, Rosciano
- Commune of Colombella: Vella, Civitella, Berancone, Monte l'Abate, Romazzano, Piccione, Pieve Pagliaccia, Busso, Morleschio, Ripa, Civitella d'Arna, Lidarno, Pilonico, San Egidio, Castel d'Arno

==== Canton of Passignano ====
- Commune of Passignano: Isola Maggiore, Monte Ruffiano, Isoletta
- Commune of Magione: Monte Colognola, Monte del Lago, Zocco, San Feliciano, San Savino, Monte Sperello, Monte Melino, Antria, Torricella, Colligiana
- Commune of Tuoro: Borghetto, Monte Gualandro, Vernazzano, Bastia
- Commune of Lisciano: Fratta, Cornia, Castel Rigone, Coceto, Borgoglione

==== Canton of Panicale ====
- Commune of Panicale: Missiano
- Commune of Mongiovino: Colle San Polo, Tavernelle, Montale, Ospedalicchio
- Commune of Pacciano: Pacciano Nuovo, Pacciano Vecchio
- Commune of Castiglion Fosco: Loro, Macereto, Jenna, Greppoleschieto, Monte Vergnano, Cibottola, Gaiche, Pietrafitta

==== Canton of Fratta ====
- Commune of Fratta: Miginalla, Polgeto, Romeggio, Monte Acuto, Monestevole, Castel Giuliano, Santa Giuliana, Castiglion dell'Abate, Monte Castelli, Monte Miggiano
- Commune of Sorbello: San Lorenzo, Leoncini, San Biagio, Colle Rasina, Comunaglia, Civitella Verna
- Commune of Preggio: San Paolo, Bastia, Creti, I Reschio, San Silvestro dell'Arcella, San Bartolomeo de Fossi, Racchiusole, Pontano, Castiglione Ugolino, Antignola, Murlo, La Bagnaja
- Commune of San Paterniano: Pietra Melina, Pierantonio, Zolfagnano, Torricella, Valcapraja, Monteagutello, Coltavolino
- Commune of Montone: San Lorenzo

==== Canton of Castiglion del Lago ====
- Commune of Castiglione del Lago: Piana, Petrignano del Lago, San Fatucchio, Gioiella, Pozzuolo, Badia, Isola Polvese
- Commune of Montalera: Panicarola, San Arcangelo
- Commune of Vajano: Porto Filippo, Baccati, Canto Gallina, Laviano

==== Canton of Città di Castello ====
- Commune of Città di Castello: Cerbara, Rignano, San Giovanni, Navale, Valle Urbano, Paterno, Pieve delle Rose, Grumale, Belvedere, Franano, Monte Maggiore, San Martino d'Upo, Santa Lucia, San Sabino, Ponte d'Avorio, Cornetto, Promano, Scalocchio, Parnacciano, Val di Role, Bottina
- Commune of San Giustino: Celalba, Selci, Lama, Corposano, Sant'Anastasio, Val di Monte, Capouno, Fondaccio
- Commune of Pietralunga: Pieve de Suddi, Coldeggi, Castelfranco, Colfo Maro

==== Canton of Città della Pieve ====
- Commune of Città della Pieve: San Donato, San Bartolomeo
- Commune of Piegaro
- Commune of Monteleone: Montegabbione, Montegiove, Castel di Fiore, Carnajolo

==== Canton of Monte Santa Maria ====
- Commune of Monte Santa Maria: Ulpiano, Val di Petrina, Trevina, Paterno, San Secondo, Croce di Castiglione
- Commune of Lippiano: Rovigliano, Colle Lerchi, Cagnano, Margano
- Commune of Citerna: San Romano, Pestrino, Vengone
- Commune of Lugnano: Canorico, Falerno, Frestina, Petroja, Ronti, Moria, Gironso, San Vittorino, Petrella, San Pietro a Monte, San Leo a Bastia, Bomiano, Mucignano

=== Arrondissement of Foligno ===
==== Canton of Foligno ====
- Commune of Foligno: Lavescia Terme, San Eraclio, Carpello, Sterpeto, Borroni, Belfiore, Cancellara, Roviglieto, Opello, San Sebastiano, Scandolara, Corvia, Cave, Maceratola, Particani, Scafali, Pescara, Serra, San Stefano de' Piccioni, San Vittore, Tozzi, Rami, Freggio, Valle, Fiammenga, Butino
- Commune of Polo: Sustrino, Colle San Lorenzo, Rio, Capo d'Acqua, Pieve Favonica, Ponte Centesimo, Ponte Santa Lucia
- Commune of Scopoli: Ponte Santa Lucia, Colle Lungo, Case Nuove, Serrone, Cupali
- Commune of Colfiorito: Anifo, Fondi
- Commune of Verchiano: Rasiglia, Volperino, Morro, Popola

==== Canton of Trevi ====
- Commune of Trevi: Parano, Bovara, La Pigge, Pettino, Santa Maria in Valle, Matigge, Manciano, Ponzi, Radiscosa, Le Coste, Canajola, San Lorenzo
- Commune of Fratta: Fabri, San Luca, Picicche
- Commune of Camorro: Torvano

==== Canton of Bevagna ====
- Commune of Bevagna: Pomonte, Tor di Colle, Cantalupo
- Commune of San Terenziano: Grutti, Saragano, Ceralto, Barattano, Turri
- Commune of Gualdo Cattaneo: Pozzo, Cisterna, Gagliole, Marcellano, Pemigni

==== Canton of Montefalco ====
- Commune of Montefalco: Assignano, Poggio Turrita, Camian Grande, Camian Piccolo, Torri, Casale, Rignano, Cerrete, Monte Pennino, Colle San Clemente, Pietra Acuta, Agello, Cavolata, Cassero, Colle Arfuso, Rocchetta, Scorcinaglia
- Commune of Castel Ritaldi: San Quirico, San Giovanni, Petrognano, Poggio del Vescovo
- Commune of Giano: Colle del Marchese, Morcicchia, Morgnano, Castagnola

==== Canton of Spello ====
- Commune of Spello: Colle Pino, San Giovanni
- Commune of Cannara: Limigiano, Castelbuono

==== Canton of Assisi ====
- Commune of Assisi: Armenzano, Castelnuovo, Tor di Betto, Palazzo, Tor Sant'Andrea, Porziano, Santa Maria, San Vitale, Costa di Trex, San Damiano, Paradiso, Pieve San Niccolò
- Commune of Bastia: Bastiola
- Commune of Petrignano: Sterpeto, Pianella, Santa Tecla, Tor Chiaggina, Moro, Monte Verde, Rocca, San Gregorio

==== Canton of Nocera ====
- Commune of Nocera: Postignano, Bagni, Masciano, Costa, Parrano, Pertanno, Bagnaja, Torifa, Stravignano, San Giovenale, Santa Croce
- Commune of Collemincio: Poggio di Sopra, Poggio di Sotto, Schiagni
- Commune of Valtopina: Serra, Poggio Giove, Gallana, Santa Cristina, Balciano, Pacciano, Sasso, San Silvestro, Cerqua, Vallemare, Cassignano,
- Commune of Colle: Gaifana, Boschetto, Salmareggia, Santa Lucia

==== Canton of Gualdo di Nocera ====
- Commune of Gualdo: Rigali, Reveto, Corcia, Petraja, Busca, Cocchio, Caprara, Casciano, San Pellegrino, San Facondino, Grillo, Pastina, Morano
- Commune of Casa Castalda: Pieve di Compresseto, Chifanoja, Valle di Rosina, San Ercolano

==== Canton of Bettona ====
- Commune of Bettona: Campagne, Forte, Passazio, Cerreto, Sala, Colle, Valiano, Canarazzo, Monte Malandrajo, Canafano, Colle Maggio
- Commune of Deruta: Castel Leone, Casalino, Ripa Bianca, Casal Alto
- Commune of Collazzone: Gaglietole, Antonella, Colle, Passo, Torricella

=== Arrondissement of Todi ===
==== Canton of Todi (urban) ====
- Commune of Todi: Pantalla, Ripajoli, Cacciano, Ilci, Due Santi, San Damiano, Ponte di Cuti, Pesciano, Vasciano, Acqua Loreto, Cecca, Nibbi, Asproli, Ameto, San Sigismondo, Chianano, Monte Nero, Canoscio, Casa di Mascio, Cordigliano, Frontignano, Fiore, Izzalini, Loreto, Lorgnano, Monticello, Petroso, Porchiano, Pian di San Martino, Pian di Porto, Quadro, Romazzano, Rocchette, Spettera, Torre Gentile, Torre Ceccona, Monte Molino, Col Valenza
- Commune of Castel Todino: Quadrelli, Configni, Colle Secco, Rosceto, Cosigliano, Rosato
- Commune of Sismano: Camerata, Dunarobba, Farnetta

==== Canton of Todi (rural) ====
- Commune of Massa: Viepri, Colpetrazzo, Castelvecchio, Montignana, Mezzanelli, Villa, Castel Rinaldi, Montecchio di Spoleto, Torre Lorenzetta, Ficareto

==== Canton of Amelia ====
- Commune of Amelia: Monte Campano, Foce, Montoro, Fornole, Collicello, Frattuccia, San Liberato
- Commune of Giove: Penna, Attigliano
- Commune of Lugnano: Porchiano
- Commune of Montecastrilli: Macchie, Castel dell'Aquila, Avigliano, San Focetole

==== Canton of Baschi ====
- Commune of Baschi: Civitella, Tenaglia, Montecchio, Salviano
- Commune of Guardea: Poggio, Alviano
- Commune of Toscolano: Morre, Morruzze, Melezzole, Santa Restituta, Colle Lungo

==== Canton of Orvieto ====
- Commune of Orvieto: Sugano, Castel Rubella, Porano, Torre San Severo e Martirio, Corbara, Botto, Bardano, Canale, Capretta, Litigata, San Egidio, Santi Faustino e Bartolomeo, Sassi, Morrano, Bagni, Torre di Monte, Civitella d'Agliano
- Commune of Lubriano: Sermugnano, Vajano
- Commune of San Venanzo: Pornello, Rote, Castello, Ripalvella, San Vito, Monte Giove, Palazzo Bovarino, Fratta, Guida, Rocca Ulissena, Castel di Ripa, Prodo, Titignano

==== Canton of Acquapendente ====
- Commune of Acquapendente: Torre Alfina
- Commune of Castel Viscardo: Viceno, Benano, Castel Giorgio, Monte Rubiaglia
- Commune of Onano
- Commune of Proceno
- Commune of Ficulle: Tortone, Meale, Sola, Sant'Abbondio
- Commune of Allerona: Castelluccio, Trevinano
- Commune of Fabro: San Pietro, Acqua Ortus
- Commune of Parrano

==== Canton of Marsciano ====
- Commune of Marsciano: Poggio Aquilone, Civitella de' Conti, Papiano, Cerqueto, Migliano, Morcella e Vitiano, Campignano
- Commune of Monte Castello: Doglio, Fratta di Todi, Montione

== See also ==
- 130 departments of the First French Empire
