= J. Rodolfo Wilcock =

Argentine writer, poet, critic and translator (1919-1978)

Juan Rodolfo Wilcock
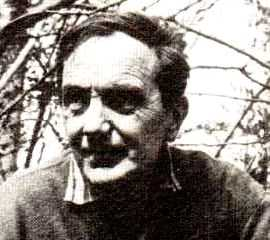
- Juan Rodolfo Wilcock
- Born: 17 April 1919; Buenos Aires, Argentina
- Died: 16 March 1978 (aged 58); Lubriano, Italy
- Occupations: Writer, poet, critic, translator, engineer

Juan Rodolfo Wilcock (17 April 1919 – 16 March 1978) was an Argentine-Italian writer, poet, critic and translator. He was the son of Charles Leonard Wilcock and Ida Romegialli. He adopted a son, Livio Bacchi Wilcock, who translated Jorge Luis Borges' work into Italian.

== Early life ==
Wilcock was born in Buenos Aires, the capital and chief metropolis of Argentina, to an English father and an Argentine mother.

He studied at the University of Buenos Aires, from which he graduated as a civil engineer in 1943. That same year, he began work for a railroad company then expanding into western Argentina; the experience would be short-lived, as Wilcock resigned a year later.

Wilcock's first known literary work and accomplishment came in 1940 with the Libro de poemas y canciones ("Book of Poems and Songs"), which earned the Martín Fierro prize of the Argentine Society of Writers (SADE). The same work would also win the prestigious Municipal Award of Literature given by the City of Buenos Aires. Soon Wilcock would see himself surrounded by some of the most prominent writer-intellectuals of the time, like Jorge Luis Borges, Silvina Ocampo, and Adolfo Bioy Casares, perhaps the most influential of the many acquaintances he befriended. Wilcock would later refer to these three as a constellation and the Trinity, who helped him rise from what he called a "grey existence".

In 1945, Wilcock undertook the self-publication of two collections of poetry, Ensayos de poesía lírica ("Essays in Lyric Poetry") and Persecución de las musas menores ("Persecution of the Lesser Muses"). The following year, he would again receive the prize of the SADE, this time for his Paseo Sentimental ("Sentimental Walk"); in that same year, Wilcock published his Los hermosos días ("The Beautiful Days").

== Travels and tribulations ==
At the time, General Juan Peron's regime was suffocating intellectual life in Argentina; as World War II was over in Europe, many chose to relocate to the newly liberated capitals of the old world. In 1951 Wilcock left Argentina for the first time in a visit to Italy. He traveled in the company of Ocampo and Bioy Casares.

To live is to cross the World over with the help of bridges made of smoke; When one is already in the other side, it don't matter if the bridges disappear

== Life as an Italian writer ==
By 1953, Wilcock was residing in London, earning a living as a translator and a commentator for the BBC. After a short return to Buenos Aires the next year at the age of 34, he set sail for Italy, where he settled permanently three years later. From then on, most of his works, some of his most celebrated, would be written in Italian, a language he learned while living near Rome. During those years he wrote a letter to his friend Miguel Murmis in which he stated, "I see Argentina as an immense translation". In 1975, Wilcock requested Italian citizenship; it was finally granted him a year after his death.

Juan Rodolfo Wilcock died in his country cottage in Lubriano, Province of Viterbo, north of Rome, in March 1978. His remains were buried in the Protestant Cemetery, Rome, near the Porta San Paolo, beside the Pyramid of Cestius.

== List of works ==
=== In Spanish ===
- Libro de poemas y canciones (1940)
- Ensayos de poesía lírica (1945)
- Persecución de las musas menores (1945)
- Paseo sentimental (1946)
- Los hermosos días (1946, 1998)
- Sexto (1953, 1999)
- Los traidores (a theatrical piece in verse written in collaboration with Silvina Ocampo, 1956)
- Poemas (1980)

=== In Italian ===
- Il caos (1960)
- Fatti inquietanti (1961)
- Luoghi comuni (1961)
- Teatro in prosa e versi (1962)
- Poesie spagnole (1963)
- La parola morte (1968)
- Lo stereoscopio dei solitari (1972)
- La sinagoga degli iconoclasti (1972, translated into English by Lawrence Venuti as The Temple of Iconoclasts)
- Il tempio etrusco (1973)
- I due allegri indiani (1973)
- Parsifal (1974)
- Italienisches Liederbuch 34 poesie d'amore (1974)
- L'ingegnere (1975)
- Frau Teleprocu (In collaboration with Francesco Fantasia, 1976)
- Il libro dei mostri (1978)

==== Posthumous ====
- Poesie (1980)
- L'abominevole donna delle nevi e altre commedie (1982)
- Le nozze di Hitler e Maria Antonietta nell'inferno (in collaboration with Francesco Fantasia, 1985)
- Il reato di scrivere (2010)
- Italienisches Liederbuch(Translated into German by Hans Raimund as Italienisches Liederbuch, Löcker Verlag>/Wien 2023
