= La Venuta =

Italian festival

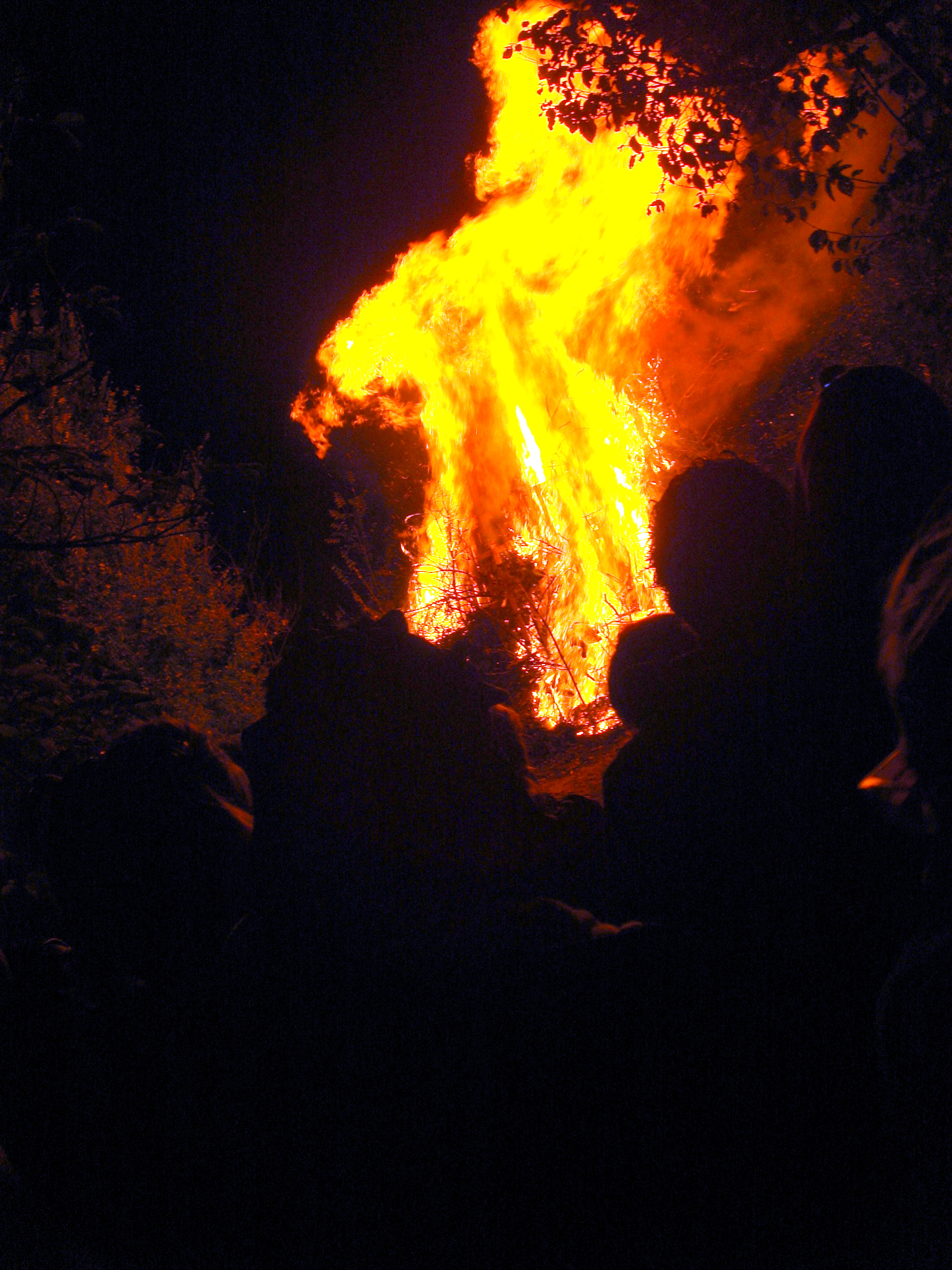
- A Focaraccio della Venuta in Ancona
- Official name: Festa della Venuta della Santa Casa
- Observed by: Roman Catholics
- Significance: The Holy House was flown by Angels to Loreto
- Celebrations: Bonfires are lit all around the Marche and part of Umbria, reminiscent of those used in 1291 to light the way for the Holy House on its way to Loreto
- Begins: 9 December
- Ends: 10 December
- Duration: "2 days"
- Frequency: Annual

La Festa della Venuta della Santa Casa ("The Feast of the Arrival of the Holy House"), colloquially known as La Venuta ("The Arrival") is a traditional festival in the Marche region of Italy, also widespread in some parts of Umbria, which has been held for more than four hundred years on the night between the ninth and tenth of December, lighting large bonfires in cities, towns and the countryside.

== Description ==
In the General Roman Calendar, 10 December is the feast of Our Lady of Loreto, which celebrates the translation of the Holy House. On the night of the vigil, between 9 and 10 December, in all the Marche and most of Umbria, especially in the Valnerina, there is a living tradition of lighting large bonfires (focaracci or fogaró) to "light the way to the Holy House"; these are the fires of the night of the Venuta, meaning the arrival of the Holy House. The fires are lit at the first shadows of evening in the countryside, towns and cities, including the capital, Ancona, where the various districts compete to set up the highest and most beautiful fire. When the fires are low, the children throw firecrackers and flares and challenge each other to jump across the embers, traditionally nine times.

According to tradition, today's fires are reminiscent of those used in 1296 to light the way for the Holy House on its way to Loreto, which is still the ideal centre of this festival, and also the only one in which the institutions themselves are the interpreters of the tradition, ignored and sometimes obstructed by other administrations. Sometimes the Litanies of Loreto are still recited around the fire, invoking the protection of the Virgin Mary, "Gate of Heaven" and "Morning Star", as tradition dictates; in other cases the focaraccio, or fogaró, has taken on a more profane character.

Since 1978, the next pilgrimage on foot from Macerata to Loreto has been announced on the occasion of the lighting of the focaraccio in the main square of Macerata; the organising committee of the pilgrimage invites people everywhere to organise the traditional bonfires every year. The scouts, some Pro Loco and numerous parishes also celebrate the Venuta every year.

The bonfire lit on the occasion of the feast takes on different names depending on the area: focaraccio (in the provinces of Macerata and Fermo), fogaró or fugaró (in the province of Ancona), faone, foghèra or fochèra (in the province of Ascoli), faore, focone, favore or also simply fuoco of the Venuta.

== Origin ==
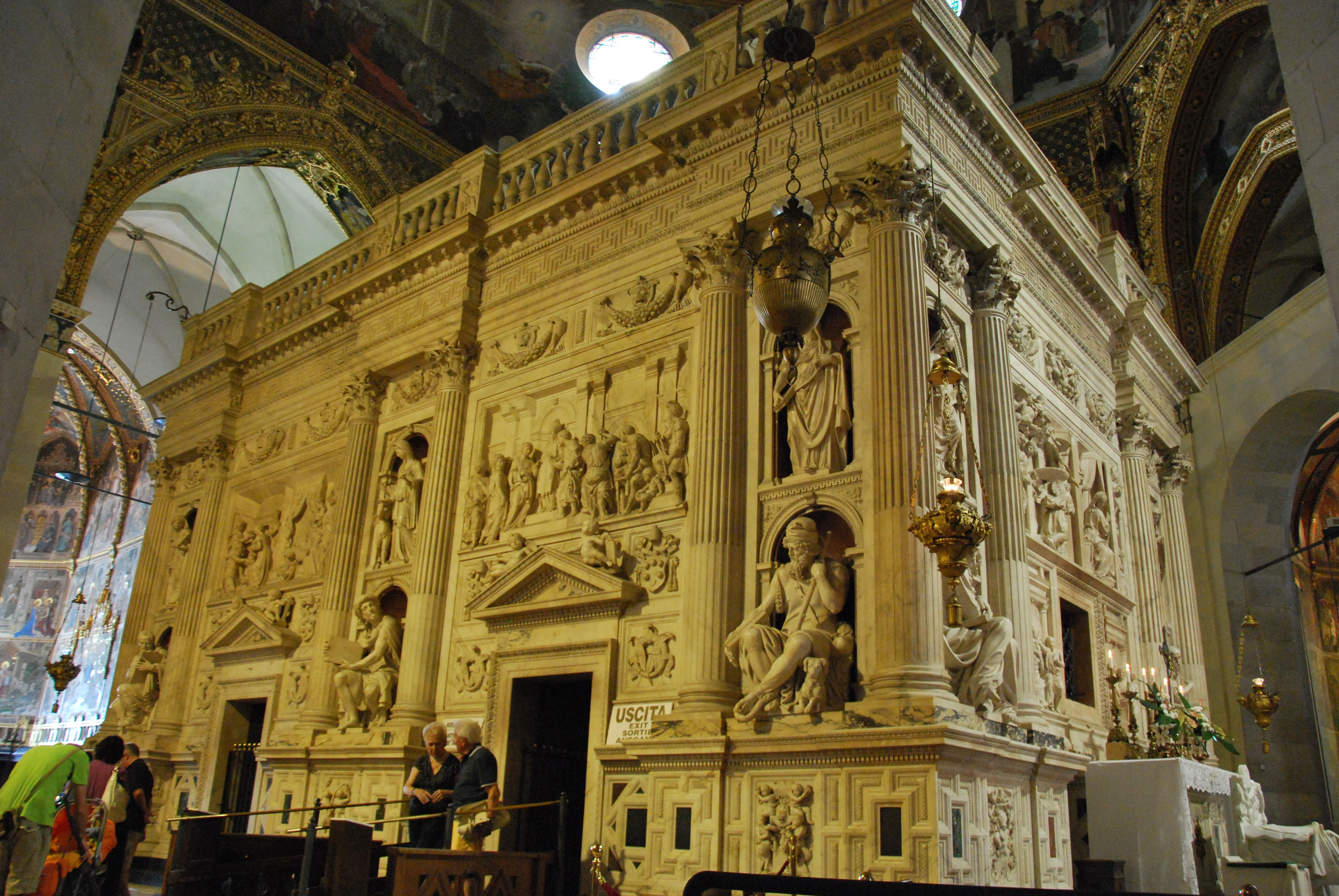
Marble screen around the Holy House

Previously a spontaneous feast, in 1617, thanks to the initiative of a Capuchin friar from Ancona, Fra' Tommaso (according to other sources, together with Father Bonifazio d'Ascoli), the custom spread throughout the Marche region. The bonfires lit in the church squares, countryside and villages throughout the region were supposed to show the route for the Virgin Mary and the Baby Jesus as they fly to their Home in Loreto.

When the feast was made official (1624), these were the prescriptions of the comune of Recanati (to which Loreto belonged at the time), described by Monaldo Leopardi himself, father of the famous poet: firing of mortars, ringing of all the bells (at 3.30 in the night, the time when the Holy House would have touched the ground), fires above the municipal towers, lights in all the windows, while large bonfires were lit in the towns, in all the city districts and in the yards of all the country houses. Anyone with a firearm had to fire a shot in the air, as a sign of festivity, followed by the Messa della Venuta. In Ancona people fasted on the eve of the feast, while the population of the provinces of Ascoli and Fermo ate a large meal called "Nataletto" (Natalitte in local dialect).

Giuseppe Garibaldi also attended the feast of the Venuta in 1849, when he was in Ancona to ask patriotic circles for support for the cause of the Roman Republic.

== The Feast of La Venuta in the countries of emigration from the Marche ==
The many emigrants who, between the end of the nineteenth and the beginning of the twentieth century, left their homeland in search of work continued to celebrate the feast day in their various countries of adoption, especially in Argentina, where emigration from the Marche was particularly intense. It was in Argentina that, among the communities from the Marche, the idea arose to officially celebrate a "day of the Marche" on the feast of the Venuta.

== Marche Day ==
In 2004, the regional council decided to celebrate 10 December as "Giornata delle Marche" ("Marche Day), with the aim of "reflecting on and emphasising the history, culture, traditions and testimonies of the Marche community, in order to strengthen its knowledge and sense of belonging". The date chosen is the one on which, all over the world, the many Marche communities living abroad have always spontaneously celebrated their origins: the feast of Our Lady of Loreto, during the eve of which the fires of the Venuta are lit, recognised by the Marche people as an ideal and spiritual reference point for their land and origins. On the occasion of the celebration, the 'Picchio d'oro' ("Golden Woodpecker") is awarded to people from the Marche region 'who have distinguished themselves in their respective professional fields or who have brought prestige to the regional community with their name' (the woodpecker is the symbol of the region).

== La Venuta in other regions ==
In Umbria, too, the Festa della Venuta is celebrated in some centres, for example in Cascia (Focone della Venuta), Monteleone di Spoleto, Scheggino, Assisi (brought forward to December 7th), Rasiglia, Sigillo.

The feast held to celebrate the translation of the Holy House to Umbria is called "Festa del Passaggio", instead of "Festa della Venuta". The popular tradition wants in fact that the Holy House passed through Umbria before arriving in Marche.

== Sources ==
- Monaldo Leopardi (1841). La Santa Casa di Loreto discussioni istoriche e critiche (in Italian).
- Giuseppe Pitrè (1899). Curiosità popolari tradizionali (in Italian). Vol. 16. L. Pedone Lauriel. p. 82 ff.
- Giovanni Crocioni (1951). La gente marchigiana nelle sue tradizioni (in Italian). Corticelli. p. 74 ff.
- Norberto Mancini (1954). "La festa della Venuta". La mia terra (in Italian). Editrice C.E.I.
- Roberto Almagià (1961). Le regioni d'Italia (in Italian). Vol. X. UTET. p. 314.
- Tuttitalia, enciclopedia dell'Italia antica e moderna (in Italian). Vol. Marche. Istituto geografico De Agostini e Casa editrice Sansoni. 1963. p. 70.
- AA. VV (1966). "La Venuta". Bollettino della Società Geografica Italiana. IX (in Italian). VII: 367 ff.
- Tradizioni e costumi d'Italia (in Italian). Istituto geografico De Agostini. 1983. p. 356 - Ancona - and 343 - Loreto.
- Giuseppe Santarelli (1999). La Santa Casa di Loreto: un'esperienza di fede e di arte attraverso i secoli (in Italian). Milano: Mondadori.
- AA.VV. Marche. Guida d'Italia (in Italian). Milano: Touring Club Italiano. p. 416.
- Antonella Picciotti (2007). "La Venuta, una leggenda? Una tradizione". Una storia una vita (in Italian). Lìbrati Editrice.
