= Porano =

- Comune
- Comune di Porano
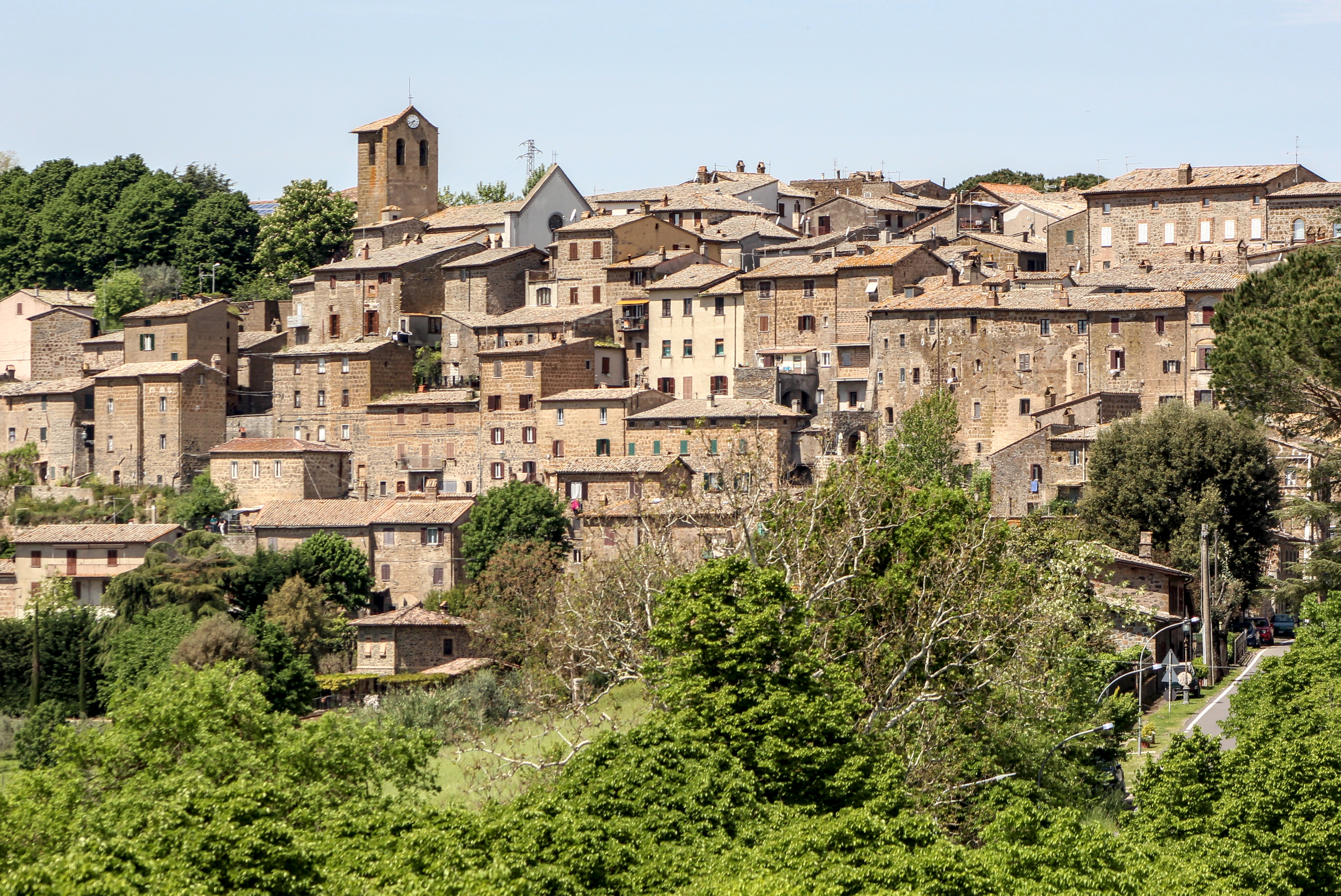
- View of Porano

- Location within Italy Location within Umbria
- Coordinates: 42.687241°N 12.102129°E
- Country: Italy
- Region: Umbria
- Province: Province of Terni (TR)

Area
  - Total: 13.5 km^{2} (5.2 sq mi)
- Elevation: 444 m (1,457 ft)

Population (1 January 2025)
  - Total: 1,840
  - Density: 136/km^{2} (353/sq mi)
- Time zone: UTC+1 (CET)
  - Summer (DST): UTC+2 (CEST)
- Postal code: 05010
- Dialing code: 0763

Porano is a comune (municipality) in the Province of Terni in the Italian region of Umbria, located about 50 km southwest of Perugia and about 45 km northwest of Terni.

== Etymology ==
The name Porano derives from the Latin poranum, in turn from porro, meaning "further ahead" or "outpost", in reference to its position.

== History ==
The area shows evidence of a significant Etruscan center, notably through the Golini and Hescana tombs. Porano is first recorded in the 12th century as a rural settlement, while by the mid-14th century it is attested as a fortified settlement.

In the Middle Ages it was a fortified place of sufficient importance to be contested during the conflicts that affected the territory of Orvieto. In 1219 and again in 1313 it fell into the hands of the Ghibellines, and suffered damage during those struggles. In 1316 Porano suffered considerable damage during conflicts involving the Ghibellines, as part of broader civil strife.

During the 14th century it was held by the Avveduti family, important landowners in the area. In the early 15th century, following the passage of Ladislaus of Anjou, Porano remained under the jurisdiction of Orvieto together with Castel Rubello.

During the Napoleonic period it was included in the Department of Trasimeno. After the Restoration it returned to the district of Orvieto within the Delegation of Viterbo.

In 1860 the town was occupied by Captain Masi and the Cacciatori del Tevere.

In 1895 Porano had a population of 1,112 inhabitants.

== Geography ==
Porano is situated on a plateau south of Orvieto at an elevation of 444 metres (1,457 ft) above sea level, at a distance of about 6 kilometres (3.7 mi) from the city. The territory is predominantly volcanic in character.

Mulberry, olive, pine and cypress trees grow successfully in the area. The territory is also noted for its chestnuts.

Castel Rubello is part of the municipality.

Porano borders the following municipalities: Lubriano, Orvieto.

== Economy ==
In the 19th century agriculture formed the basis of the local economy. In addition to crop production and viticulture, lime burning employed a portion of the population. The town was reportedly a seasonal retreat for wealthy families from elsewhere.

== Religion and culture ==
=== San Biagio ===
The church of San Biagio, mentioned as early as the 13th century, has undergone numerous alterations and today differs significantly from its original form. It preserves frescoes of the 14th century, including representations of Saint Blaise and the Annunciation, as well as a marble stoup dated 1608 by Rutilio Laurenzi. On either side of the high altar are two frescoes depicting Saint Francis and Saint Sebastian, the latter dated 1465.

The church also houses a relic associated with Fra' Paolo da Porano, consisting of the Franciscan emblem from his habit, transferred from the nearby convent of San Crispino where he was buried. In the sacristy there is a parish cross, formerly covered with enamels, dating to the 15th century. One side depicts the Crucifix with the Virgin, Saint John, and Mary Magdalene; the other shows Saints Biagio and Paul together with two prophets.

=== Villa Paolina and Park ===
Villa Paolina, also known as Villa del Corniolo, is a large complex set along the road from Porano toward Bagnoregio. It stands within a historic park of about 9 hectares (22 acres).

The villa was built in 1706 at the initiative of the marquis Giovan Battista Gualtiero on the site of a pre-existing monastic structure, intended as a summer residence for prelates. From 1874 the complex underwent transformations under the Viti Mariani family and later passed to the Casini family. Since the 1980s it has belonged to the Province of Terni.

The complex consists of a central building with two lateral wings, accessed by a terrace connected to the gardens by a double semicircular staircase. The interiors include decorated halls in 19th-century style and a gallery with grotesque decoration. Auxiliary structures include a lemon house, a farmhouse, and a semicircular exedra.

=== Castel Rubello ===
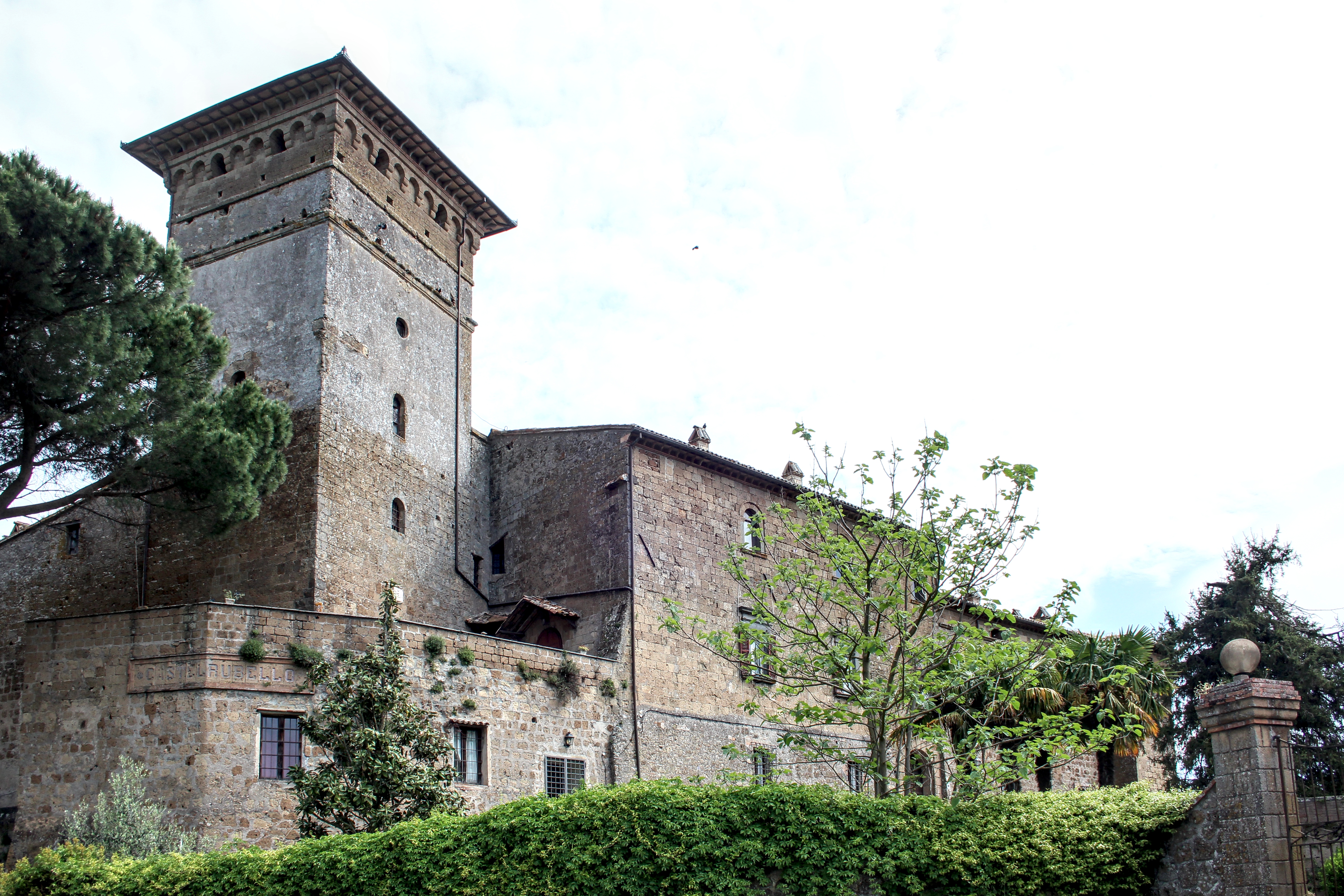
Castel Rubello

Castel Rubello, situated on a hill of 430 metres (1,410 ft), dates to the 13th century and reached its present form in the early 14th century. It consists of two connected complexes: one formed by clustered buildings and a church, naturally defended by rocky terrain and a large square tower, and another organized around a residential building with surrounding structures forming a courtyard.

The castle was contested in the 14th century between the Malcorini and Muffati families, and in the 15th century between Ladislaus of Anjou and the municipality of Orvieto. From the mid-16th century it belonged to the Valenti family, later passing to the Avveduti family.

In 1701, Castel Rubello was a feudal domain of the Avveduti. By 1803, it had passed to Baroness Valenti. In 1816, it belonged to the Jesuits, with Baron Luigi Salvatori as leaseholder.

=== Archaeology ===
The tomb of the Hescanas family is an underground chamber cut into the tuff of a small wooded hill, at the base of which flows the Montacchione stream. The tomb belonged to the aristocratic Hescanas family, active in the late 4th century BC, and is decorated with wall paintings centered on the funerary banquet, a common theme of the period.

The hypogeum has a square plan and is preceded by a corridor about 16 metres (52 ft) long, sloping gently toward the entrance, which is accessed through a double doorway. Inside, a bench runs along the walls, supporting funerary objects including sarcophagi in peperino and urns. An inscription bearing the name Vel Heschnas identifies the family.

The walls were originally decorated with a painted frieze, now largely lost. Surviving scenes include the deceased riding a chariot toward the afterlife, figures engaged in ritual or social interaction, and a banquet scene. One painted inscription included the term zil, indicating a magistrate comparable to a praetor. The tomb, though dating to the late 4th century BC, shows evidence of continued use in later periods.

== Twin towns ==
- Caudrot, France
