= Matigge =

- Frazione
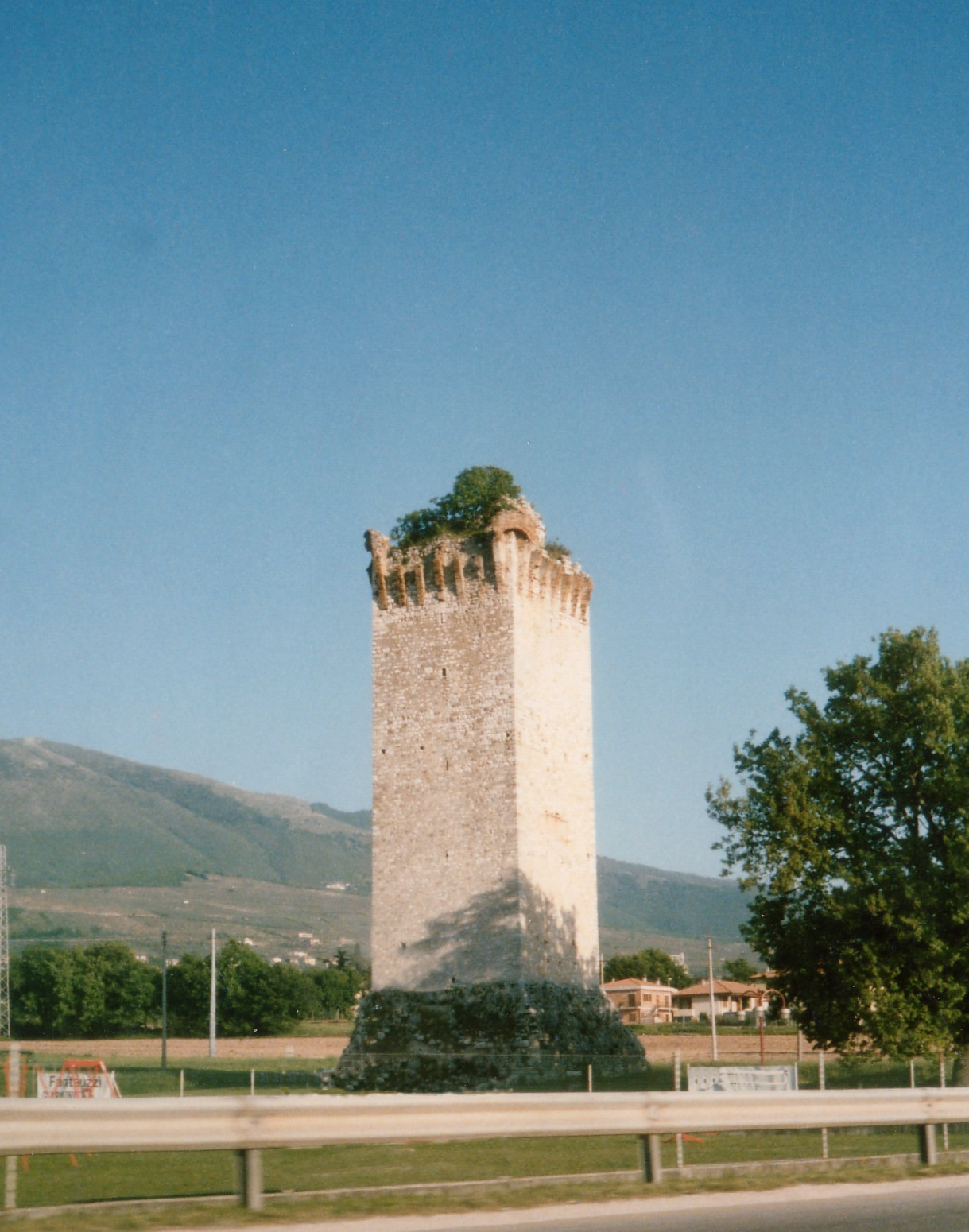
- Matigge

- Location of Matigge in Italy
- Coordinates: 42°54′N 12°44′E
- Country: Italy
- Region: Umbria
- Province: Perugia
- Comune: Trevi
- Elevation: 294 m (965 ft)

Population (2001)
  - Total: 1,095
- Time zone: UTC+1 (CET)
  - Summer (DST): UTC+2 (CEST)
- Dialing code: 0742

Matigge is a village in the Italian province of Perugia in east central Umbria, located at 294 m (965 ft) above sea-level on the lower flank of Mt. Puranno, 42°54N 12°44E. It is a frazione of Trevi, which lies 3 km (2 mi) to the south.

In 2001, it had a population of 1,095.

== History and main sights ==
The origin of the town's name is unknown, but may derive from Latin (villa) Matidiae: Matidia Minor. Matidia Minor was a noble Roman woman, a distant cousin and sister-in-law of Emperor Hadrian. This town is also named after Matidia's mother Salonia Matidia and her late maternal grandfather Praetor Gaius Salonius Matidius Patruinus. Matidia was known to have had a villa in Umbria and Matidia was a wealthy and socially conscious woman, responsible for one of the grander building schemes in Ostia. Hadrian restored a large chunk of the Umbrian Via Flaminia in AD 123‑124; it is thus an appealing, if unproven, theory, that Hadrian would have had the need for restoring the road personally brought home to him as he travelled it back and forth to his daughter's hypothetical villa.

Matigge does in fact boast of Roman remains: traces of small Roman roads, and significant Roman spolia used in the construction of the attractive Romanesque church of S. Donato. A second small Romanesque church in town is S. Niccolò.
