= Quadrelli =

Quadrelli is an Italian surname. Notable people with the surname include:

- Angelica Quadrelli (fl. 1674), Italian opera soprano and musician
- Silvio Quadrelli (1889–1970), Italian weightlifter
