= Palazzo Bovarino =

Coordinates: 42°50′18″N 12°11′46″E

Palazzo Bovarino is a historical locality in the municipality of San Venanzo, in the province of Terni, Umbria, central Italy.

Once an important rural community on the ancient via orvietana road between Perugia and Orvieto, it declined during the 19th century as new roads bypassed it.

== History ==
The site lies on the route of the ancient Etruscan road that connected Perugia with Orvieto via Monte Peglia. The area was already mentioned in 1394, when Pope Boniface IX granted Monaldo IV Monaldeschi the feudal territory known as "della Montagna", which included Palazzo Bovarino.

By the 17th century, Palazzo Bovarino was a seigniory (signoria) associated with Orvieto. In 1701, 1803, and 1816, it was listed among the fiefs subject to the jurisdiction of the magistrate of Orvieto.

From the 17th century, the counts Pollidori of Orvieto held extensive lands in Palazzo Bovarino. In 1800, the estate was sold by Countess Angelina Marsciano, widow of Luca Pollidori, to Gaetano Faina for 5,000 scudi. In 1882, the Faina family still held six farms there.

From the 19th century, Palazzo Bovarino went into decline. It had owed its medieval importance to its location on the Orvietan road linking Perugia to Orvieto. The opening of new road networks that bypassed the site deprived Palazzo Bovarino of this role.

Many inhabitants gradually transferred to Ospedaletto, taking with them local traditions and even the parish title of San Lorenzo. A school at Palazzo Bovarino was closed and replaced by schools in Ospedaletto and Spante. By the mid-20th century, Palazzo Bovarino had become almost entirely depopulated, with most inhabitants relocating to Ospedaletto and San Marino.

Today, Palazzo Bovarino is a rural locality of San Venanzo at the convergence of six roads, remembered as a once-flourishing hamlet. Its cemetery remained in use into the twentieth century, though by 2006 it was reported to be in poor condition.

== Demographics ==
In 1656, the population of Palazzo Bovarino was recorded as 361 inhabitants. In 1816, it was a luogo baronale (baronial estate) in the Delegation of Viterbo, with 372 inhabitants.

By 1833, the population was recorded at 339, with a territory of 39,137 tavole (local land measure).

A statistical survey of the Papal States in 1853 reported 517 inhabitants, organised in 57 families. Only 10 residents lived in the central settlement, while 507 lived dispersed in the countryside, almost all engaged in agriculture.

At the 1901 Italian census, Palazzo Bovarino had 730 inhabitants, of whom 706 were classed as sparsa (scattered) and only 24 as agglomerata (clustered in the settlement).

The 1961 census was the last to record Palazzo Bovarino as a separate frazione, at which time, it counted 178 inhabitants, including both the settlement and its surrounding area.

== Religious institutions ==
Palazzo Bovarino had a parish church dedicated to San Lorenzo, documented between 1787 and 1869. In 1824, the parish priest was the only resident of the old castle.

The parish was formally suppressed in 1955, when the title was transferred to the church of San Lorenzo in Ospedaletto.
