= Scheggino =

- Comune
- Comune di Scheggino
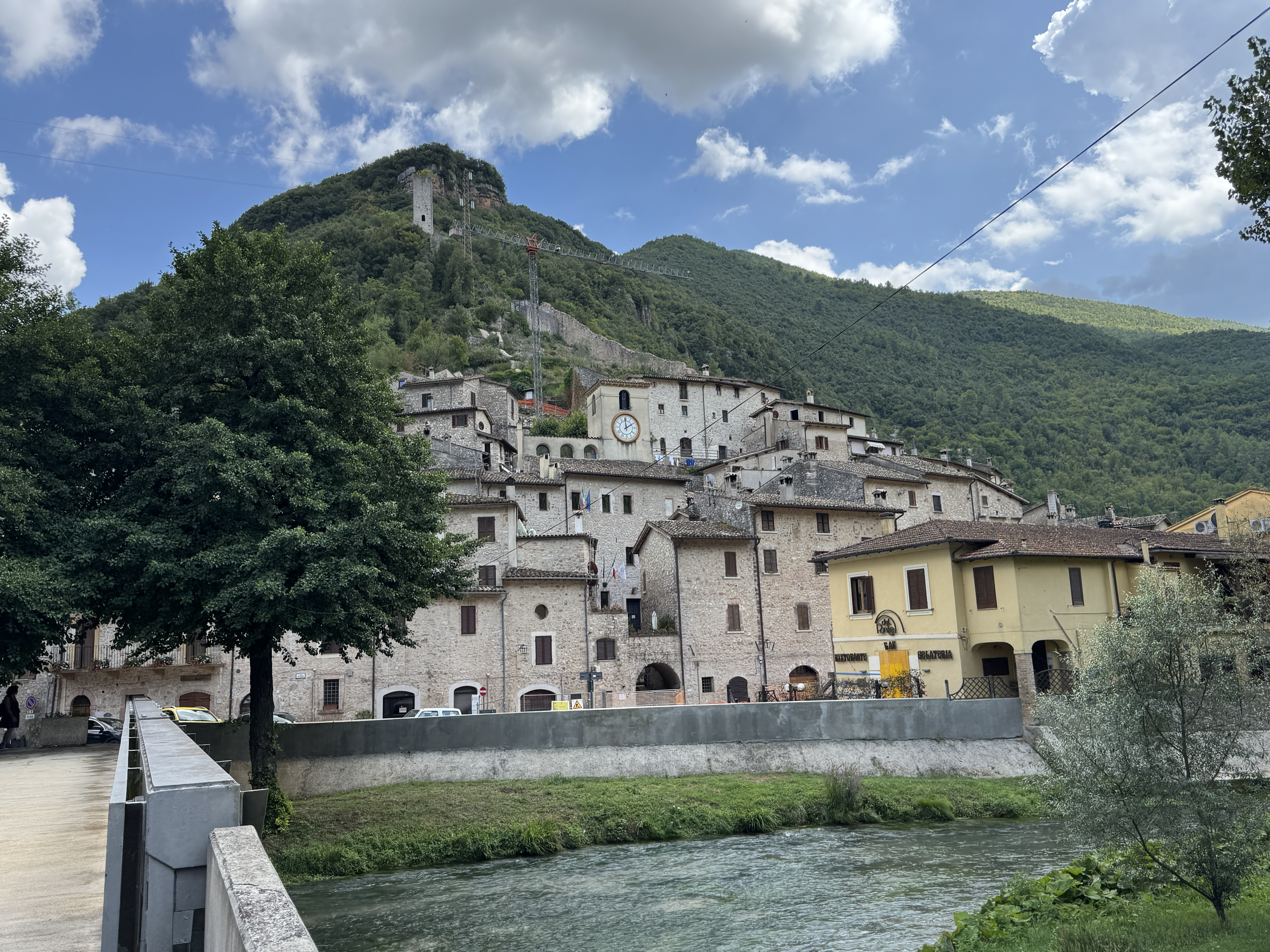
- View of Scheggino

- Location within Italy Location within Umbria
- Coordinates: 42.712529°N 12.83107°E
- Country: Italy
- Region: Umbria
- Province: Province of Perugia (PG)

Government
  - Mayor: Fabio Dottori

Area
  - Total: 35.2 km^{2} (13.6 sq mi)
- Elevation: 281 m (922 ft)

Population (1 January 2025)
  - Total: 426
  - Density: 12.1/km^{2} (31.3/sq mi)
- Time zone: UTC+1 (CET)
  - Summer (DST): UTC+2 (CEST)
- Postal code: 06040
- Dialing code: 0743

Scheggino is a comune (municipality) in the Province of Perugia in the Italian region Umbria, located about 60 km southeast of Perugia.

Scheggino borders the following municipalities: Ferentillo, Monteleone di Spoleto, Sant'Anatolia di Narco, Spoleto.

== Etymology ==
The name is recorded as having evolved from Schiaginum to Schezzino and then to Scheggino, with the later form established by the early 18th century.

== History ==
=== Middle Ages ===
Scheggino originated as a medieval castle, built as a defensive work against Saracen raids. The oldest nucleus, known as Capo la terra, dates to the 13th century and developed close to the fortress, probably to accommodate inhabitants of the nearby feudal castle of Pozzano after its destruction.

In the 13th and 14th centuries Scheggino had strategic and economic importance and remained loyal to the Duchy of Spoleto, while maintaining a noted degree of autonomy even under Spoleto's authority. In 1391 it was besieged and looted by enemies of Spoleto.

=== Revolt of 1522 ===
In 1522 Picozzo Brancaleoni, a banished citizen of Spoleto, unsuccessfully besieged the fortress of Scheggino. Afterwards Petrolio da Vallo joined Picozzo and other exiles, and they began carrying out raids in the Valnerina, using Cerreto as their base.

In early September 1522 the group moved against Vallo. On 9 September Don Alfonso, governor of Spoleto and brother of the Duke of Cardona, a grandee of Spain, left the city with a small force, believing it sufficient to deal with the rebels. After crossing the bridge of Piedipaterno he encountered them. Don Alfonso rode forward to Petrone, who was advancing ahead of the group, and angrily demanded whether he was Petrone. When the latter answered that he was, Don Alfonso struck him with a blow of his giannetta, causing him to fall from his horse. Petrone's companions then turned their weapons against the governor and killed him. Five Spaniards of his household also died beside him. According to some traditions, Brancaleoni and da Vallo were ultimately repelled by the women and young people of Scheggino.

=== Early modern and contemporary era ===
The 16th century was characterised by a series of struggles between the aristocratic families of the Orsini, supporters of the Guelph Spoleto, and the Colonna, allies of the 23 Ghibelline castle-communes of the Spoleto district.

Scheggino adopted a local statute in 1561.

In 1635, during Papal rule, Scheggino experienced economic growth when Pope Urban VIII, prompted by Cardinal Poli, established an ironworking foundry supplied with ore from the Monteleone di Spoleto mine. To support hauling, the Valcasana road was upgraded.

Between 1798 and 1814, during the period of French occupation, Scheggino followed the wider course of events in Umbria.

Administrative arrangements changed repeatedly in the 19th century. On 6 July 1816, under Pope Pius VII's reform, Scheggino was classed as a dependent community under the Delegation of Spoleto. In 1827, under Pope Leo XII, it was placed under the Sant'Anatolia mayoralty, later returning to Spoleto. In 1860 it entered the newly unified Italian state.

In 1875 the municipal territory expanded through mergers, as the former municipalities of Ceselli, Civitella and Monte San Vito were also merged into Scheggino.

Scheggino had 909 inhabitants in 1895.

== Geography ==
Scheggino stands on the left bank of the Nera at an elevation of 281 metres (922 ft). It lies about 1.5 miles (2.4 km) from Sant'Anatolia, and about 30 kilometres (19 mi) north of Terni.

The settlement stands against a mountain in a confined position. Its climate is described as temperate, with north and southeast winds prevailing. Within it lies the wood of Licineto.

The area is at high seismic risk as indicated in the P.C.M. n. 3274 of 20/03/2003 and in the Delibera Giunta Regionale of 18 September 2012 n. 1111, which places Scheggino together with the neighbouring municipalities in zone 1, the most dangerous and with high seismic intensity.

=== Fonti di Valcasana ===
The Valcasana park is located at the entrances to Scheggino. It is a large natural garden with abundant springs of clear water from resurgences that have been used since antiquity for trout farming. Within the park remains evidence of an ancient fishpond used for raising trout, eels, and crayfish. Vegetation includes a dense woodland of hornbeam, manna ash, downy oak, field maple, and beech, while in steeper and less accessible areas the vegetation is thicker and includes holm oaks, downy oaks, and pines.

=== Subdivisions ===
The municipality includes the localities of Ceselli, Chiesa Collefabbri, Civitella, Monte San Vito, Pontuglia, San Valentino, Scheggino, Schioppo.

In 2021, 29 people lived in rural dispersed dwellings not assigned to any named locality. At the time, the most populous localities were Scheggino proper (250), and Ceselli (116).

The hamlet of Ceselli lies in the Valnerina on the right bank of the Nera at 317 metres (1,040 ft), in a dominant position over the valley.

== Infrastructure and transport ==
=== Railways ===
From 1926 to 1968 Scheggino (together with the municipality of Sant'Anatolia di Narco) was served (through the homonymous station) by the Spoleto-Norcia railway, a narrow-gauge line connecting Spoleto with Norcia, which remained in operation from 1 November 1926 to 31 July 1968, when it was abolished. The traces of the railway are almost all preserved, and the trackbed has been converted into a cycle path.

== Religion and culture ==
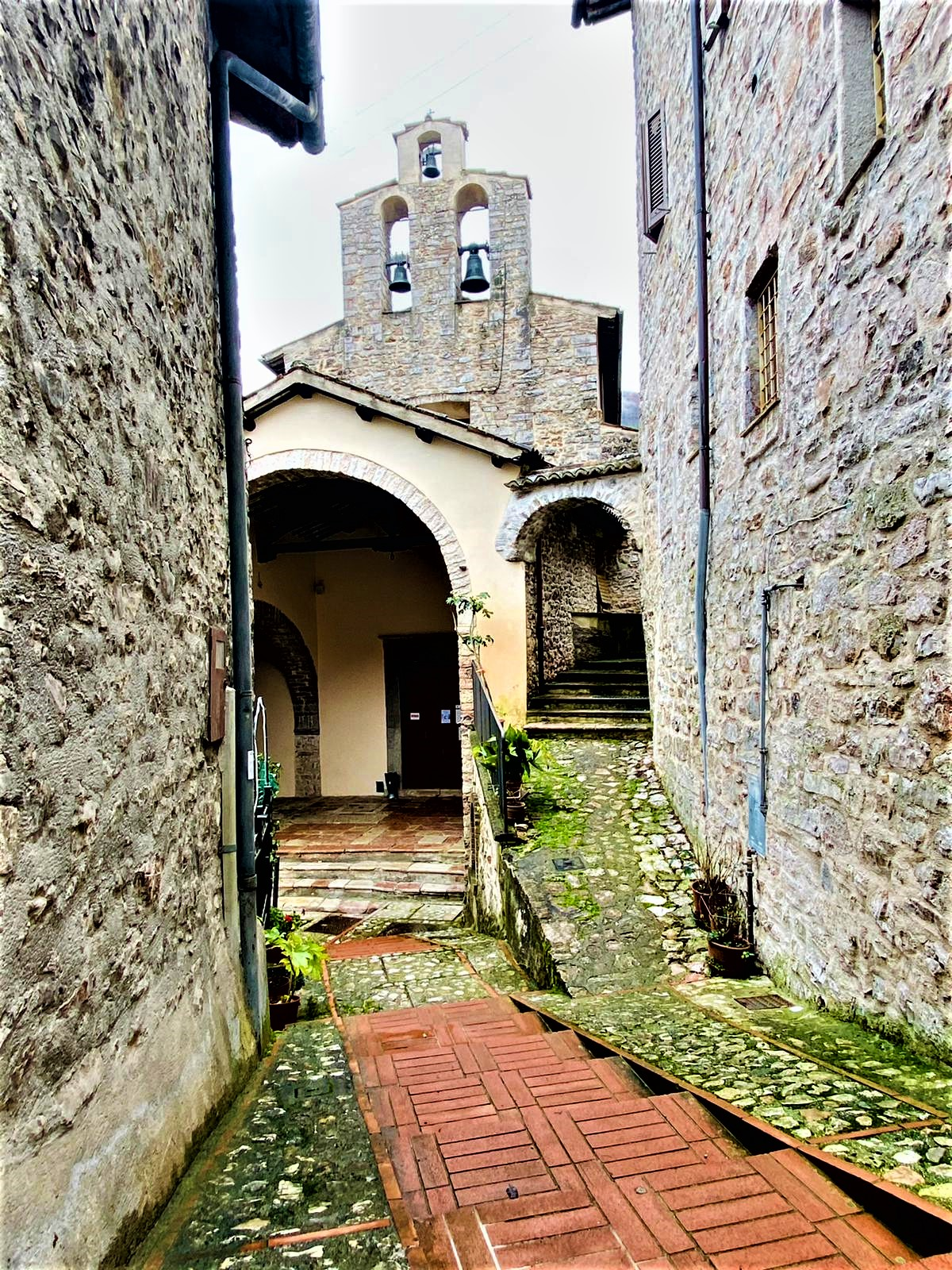
View of the Church of Saint Nicholas

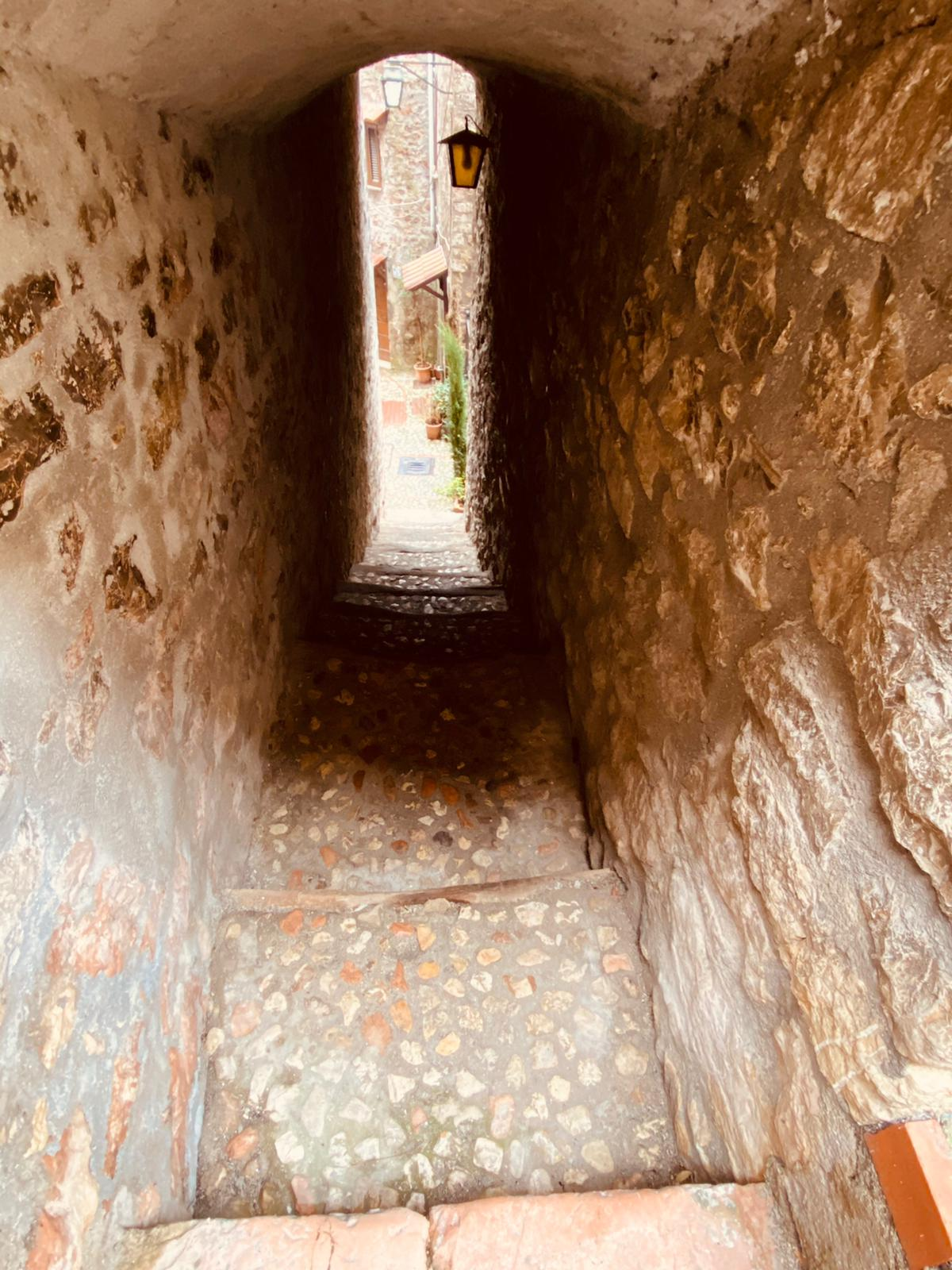
"Baciafemmine" alley

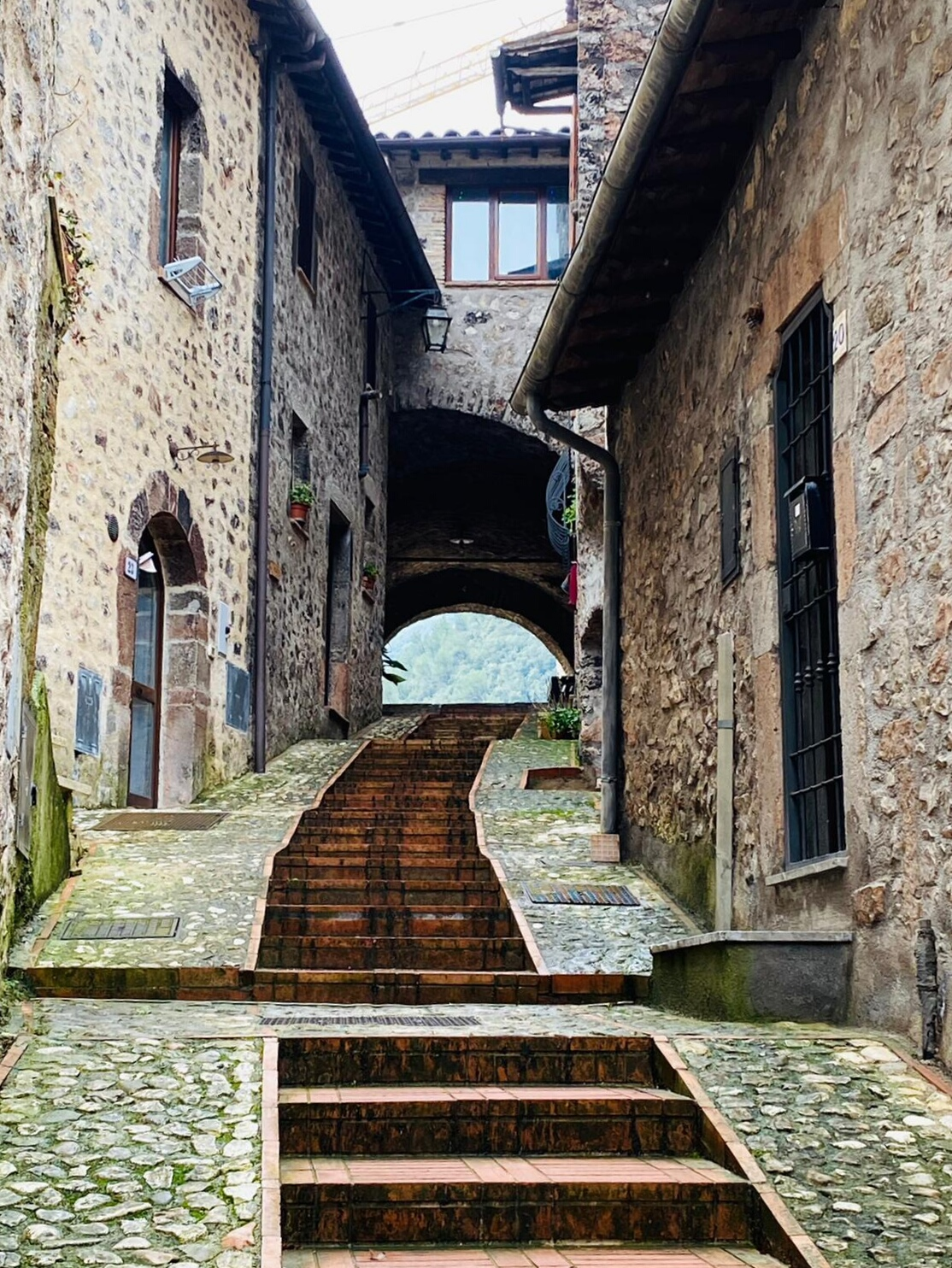
Stepped stone alleyway in the historic center of Scheggino

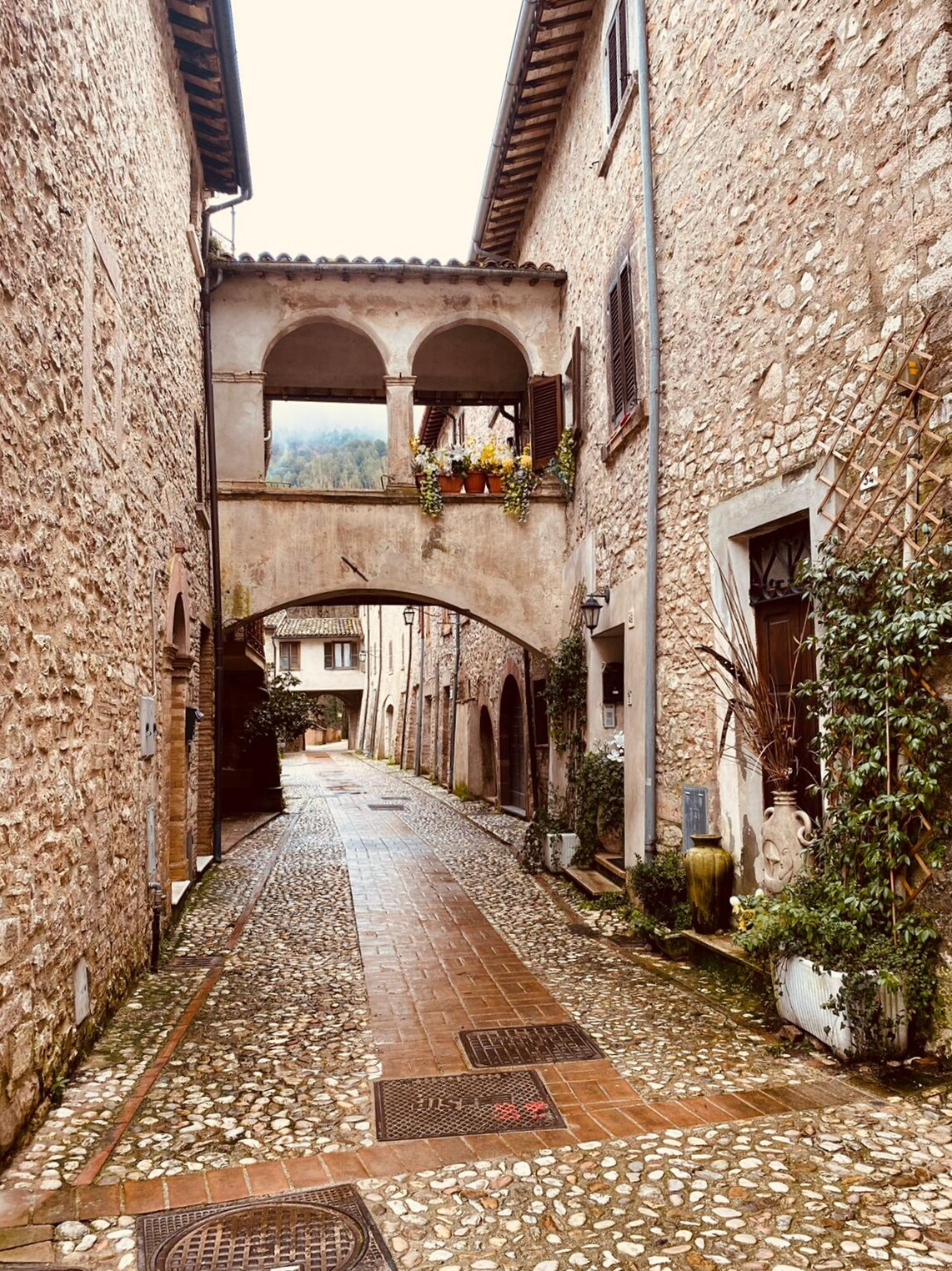
Narrow street lined with stone houses in Scheggino

=== San Nicola di Bari ===
The church of San Nicola (or Nicolò), patron saint of the town, stands in the historic center of Scheggino. The first oratory is stated to have been Early Christian. The church was enlarged in Romanesque style in the 12th century when the castle walls extended as far as the river. In 1210 it depended on the Benedictines of Sassovivo Abbey, and it became a pieve in 1446. Between 1509 and 1521 it was expanded and restored to its current form by the guild of Lombard master masons.

The entrance is preceded by a large portico, and the inscription on the architrave reads, "Lascia ogni preoccupazione se entri per pregare". The interior has three naves; in the apse are frescoes attributed to the circle of Lo Spagna, including a Coronation of Mary among Saints and a Nativity, now partly deteriorated. In the Chapel of the Rosary, to the left of the main chapel, there is a signed and dated painting by Guido Ubaldo Abbatini (1664) depicting the Madonna of the Rosary and Saints.

The church contains at its high altar an oil painting representing the Madonna of the Rosary with Saint Dominic and Saint Catherine, painted in 1595 by Pierinus Cesarensis of Perugia.

As a tribute to Spoleto, the Coronation of the Virgin was painted in the apse just like in the Cathedral of Spoleto.

=== Other religious buildings ===
Also of interest is the church of Santa Felicita (12th century), which retains its original appearance with the exception of the façade, which was modified in the 17th century.

=== Castle of Scheggino ===
Scheggino is a hillside castle with a triangular layout, crowned at its apex by the cassero (keep) of a fortress. The oldest nucleus, known as Capo la terra, dates to the 13th century and developed close to the fortress. This first walled circuit was later joined by an expansion dating to the 14th and 15th centuries that descends toward the valley, and the settlement was completed in the 16th century with the creation of the borgo alongside the mill's supply canal.

The fortification indicates the strategic role of the settlement, positioned to guard a passage on the ancient Valnerina road at the junction with the mountain route along the Valcasana.

=== Other heritage sites ===
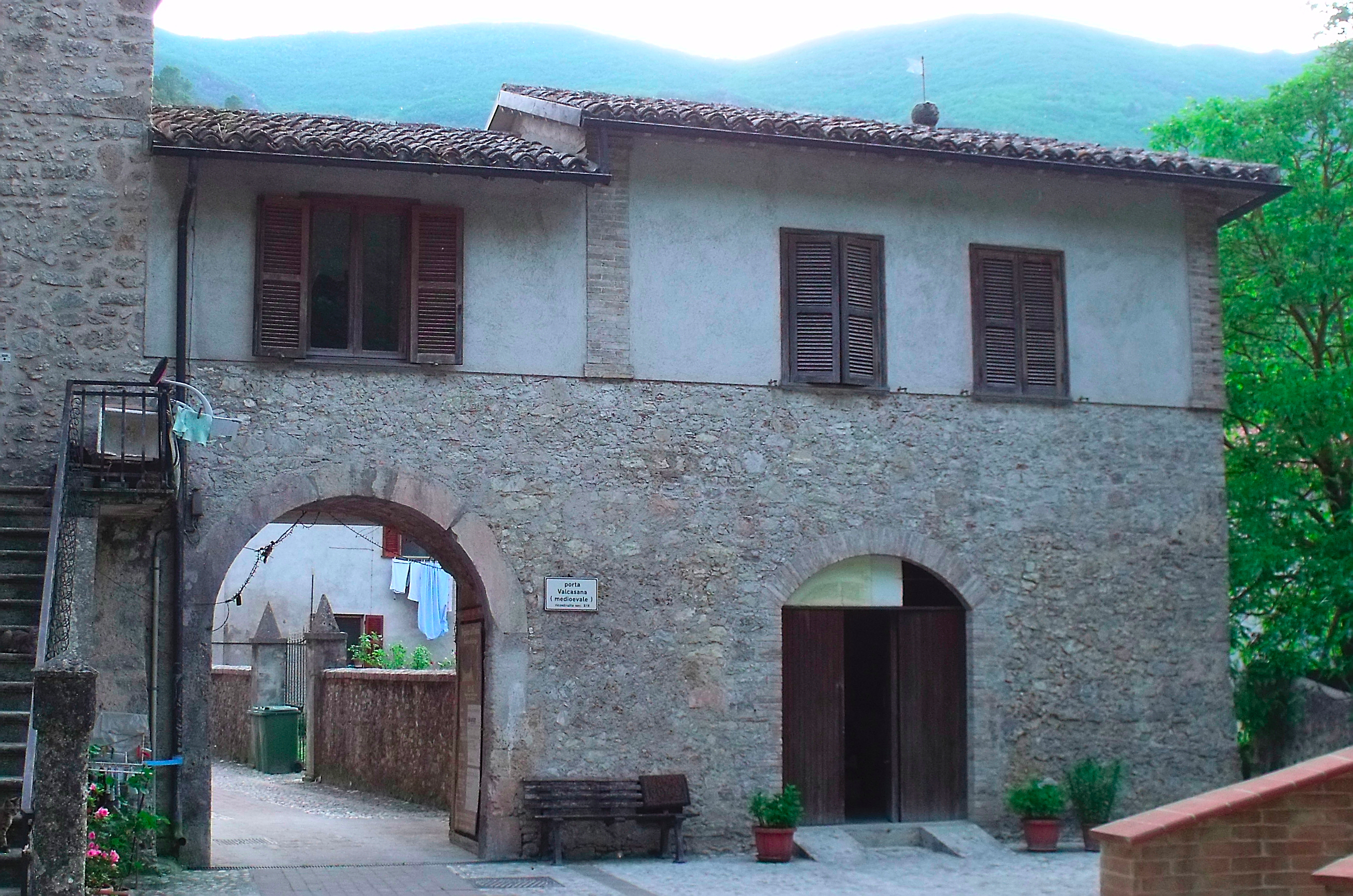
Porta Valcasana

Porta Valcasana, dating to the 16th century, was the point from which a branch of the Via del Ferro once departed. This was the road used to transport materials from mines and ironworks from Scheggino to Monteleone di Spoleto via Caso and Gavelli. The road was strengthened in the 17th century under Pope Urban VIII through the efforts of Cardinal Fausto Poli of Usigni. The area outside Porta Valcasana is rich in spring water and aquatic vegetation and, from the beginning of the 19th century, was set aside as a public park.

Palazzo Profili is an 18th-century manor house now divided into multiple apartments; after restoration it retains the main portal, entrance atrium, a courtyard with nymphaeum, and the staircase to the upper floors. The building originally also included a garden in the space in front, a greenhouse, and a fishpond.

Palazzo Graziani is an 18th-century residence built against the first circuit of walls and one of the corner towers.

The town hall occupies a distinctive 17th-century building characterized by an attic level or covered loggia; in the 20th century it was adapted for public use, with the raising of the right side into a modern civic tower equipped with a clock and bells. It contains a fresco of the Holy Family painted in 1526.

The 17th-century Porta del Pozzo, so named for the presence of a spring, is located at the southern end of Via di Borgo, on the ancient Valnerina road toward Osteria di Ceselli.

=== Events ===
- On the night between the ninth and tenth of December, the Festa della Venuta is celebrated by lighting large bonfires.
- On 23 July there is the Festa delle Donne ("Women's Festival") with a re-enactment of the historical episode of 1522 that saw the women of Scheggino as protagonists in the defence of the castle from the invasion by the castles of Valnerina, who were against the alliance between the village and the Duchy of Spoleto.
- On Epiphany Day, the Canto della Pasquarella is celebrated in which young people go around the village collecting gifts which are then consumed in the evening at a communal dinner.

== Notable people ==
In the mid-19th century, the principal families included the Mazzoneschi and the Amici. The latter family counts the Commendatore Paolo Maria Amici, who in 1859 served as district governor of Jesi.
