= Ceselli =

Coordinates: 42.68499°N 12.81757°E

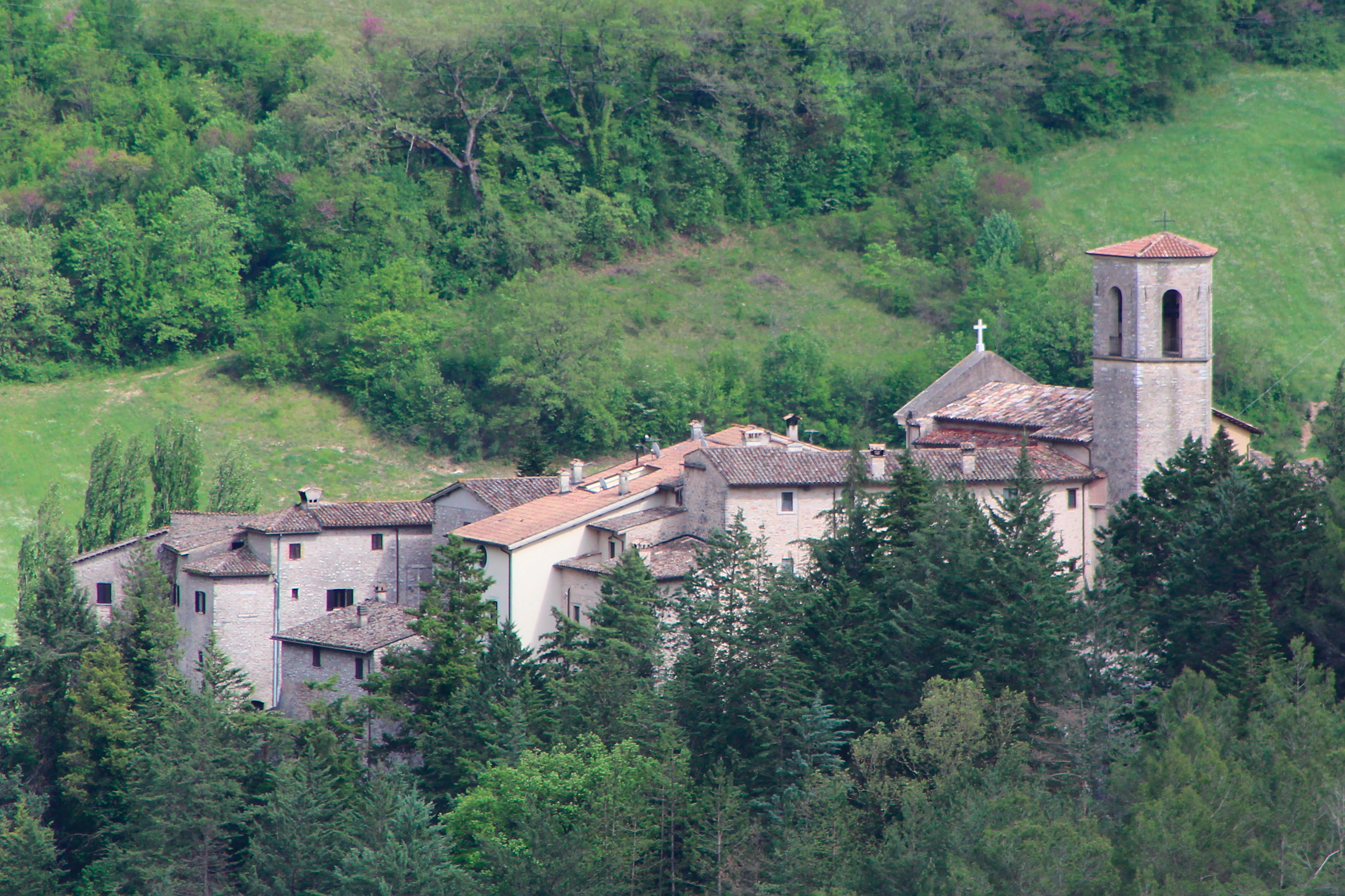
View of Ceselli, showing the village with its church and bell tower

Ceselli is a frazione of the municipality of Scheggino in the Province of Perugia, Umbria, Italy. Located at an elevation of 317 metres (1,040 ft) above sea level, it had a population of 116 inhabitants as of 31 December 2021. (Note: To obtain the data from the website: 1. Select "Basi Territoriali 2021: Confini amministrativi, Località, Sezioni di censimento, Aree SubCom".; 2. Use the search function to find the desired place.; 3. Click the Attribute Table icon in the top-right corner.; 4. In the panel that appears at the bottom of the page, select "Località 2021".)

Formerly an independent municipality, Ceselli was suppressed in 1875 and incorporated into Scheggino.

== History ==
Ceselli was built between the 13th and 14th centuries on the right bank of the Nera River. It preserves its medieval layout, with a central ramp between two gates and streets leading toward the former defensive walls. An earlier settlement stood on the hill above. In the Middle Ages, Ceselli lay at the junction of important local routes, including a crossing of the Nera at Osteria di Ceselli, a significant transit point.

In 1831, the Bishop of Spoleto, Giovanni Maria Mastai Ferretti (later Pope Pius IX) passed through the Osteria while fleeing unrest in Spoleto and was escorted overnight toward Leonessa.

Ceselli remained under the Duchy of Spoleto and was merged with Scheggino in 1875. The municipal coat of arms depicts Saint Michael the Archangel slaying the dragon.

== Geography ==
Ceselli is located in Umbria, about 10 kilometres (6.2 mi) northeast of Spoleto, with which it is connected by a municipal road. The settlement lies on the left bank of the Nera River, which crosses the territory from east to west. Two additional streams flow from south to north, joining the Nera, one upstream of Ceselli and the other near San Valentino.

The territory extends partly over hills and partly across flat land and covers an area of 955 hectares (2,360 acres).

The municipal territory historically included the hamlets of Colle Fabbri, Pentulla, San Valentino, and Schioppo.

== Demographics ==
In 1858, Ceselli had a population of 272 inhabitants. According to the 1862 census, the population had increased to 300 residents (158 males and 142 females). In 1863, only three residents were registered as political electors.

== Economy ==
In the mid-19th century, the local economy was primarily agricultural. The main products were wheat, maize, hemp, and wine.

== Religion ==
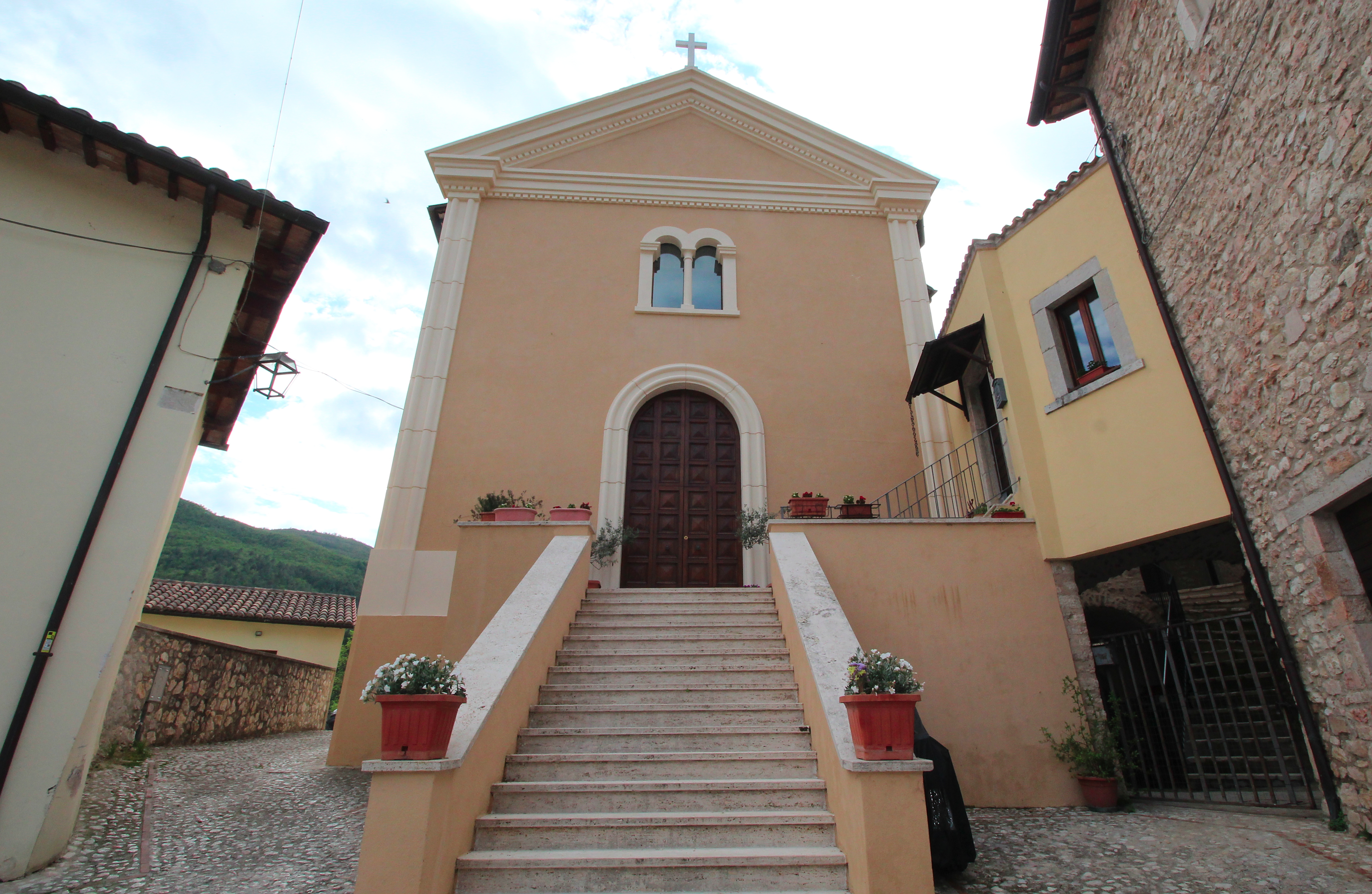
Church of San Michele Arcangelo, Ceselli

=== San Michele Arcangelo ===
The main church, dedicated to Saint Michael, stands at the top of the village. The church is documented from the 14th century. It was altered several times over the centuries and has a 19th-century façade. The interior has a single nave with side altars; the bell tower was built on the remains of the castle tower.

The interior preserves frescoes from the 15th and 16th centuries, a 1664 painting of Saint Vitus, frescoes of the Crucifixion and saints dated 1603 and depictions of the Madonna and Child from 1525. Traces of 16th-century frescoes also survive in the sacristy.

=== San Vito ===
Above Ceselli, outside the inhabited area, stands the small Romanesque church of San Vito. Popular tradition venerates Saint Vitus against diseases of rabies.

=== San Sabino ===
Near the cemetery, along the old road to Spoleto, is the Romanesque church of San Sabino (or Savino), bishop and martyr of Umbria who was killed in Spoleto. The interior has a single nave and includes traces of frescoes dating partly to the 16th century.
