= Arezzo di Spoleto =

Coordinates: 42.7086°N 12.6276°E

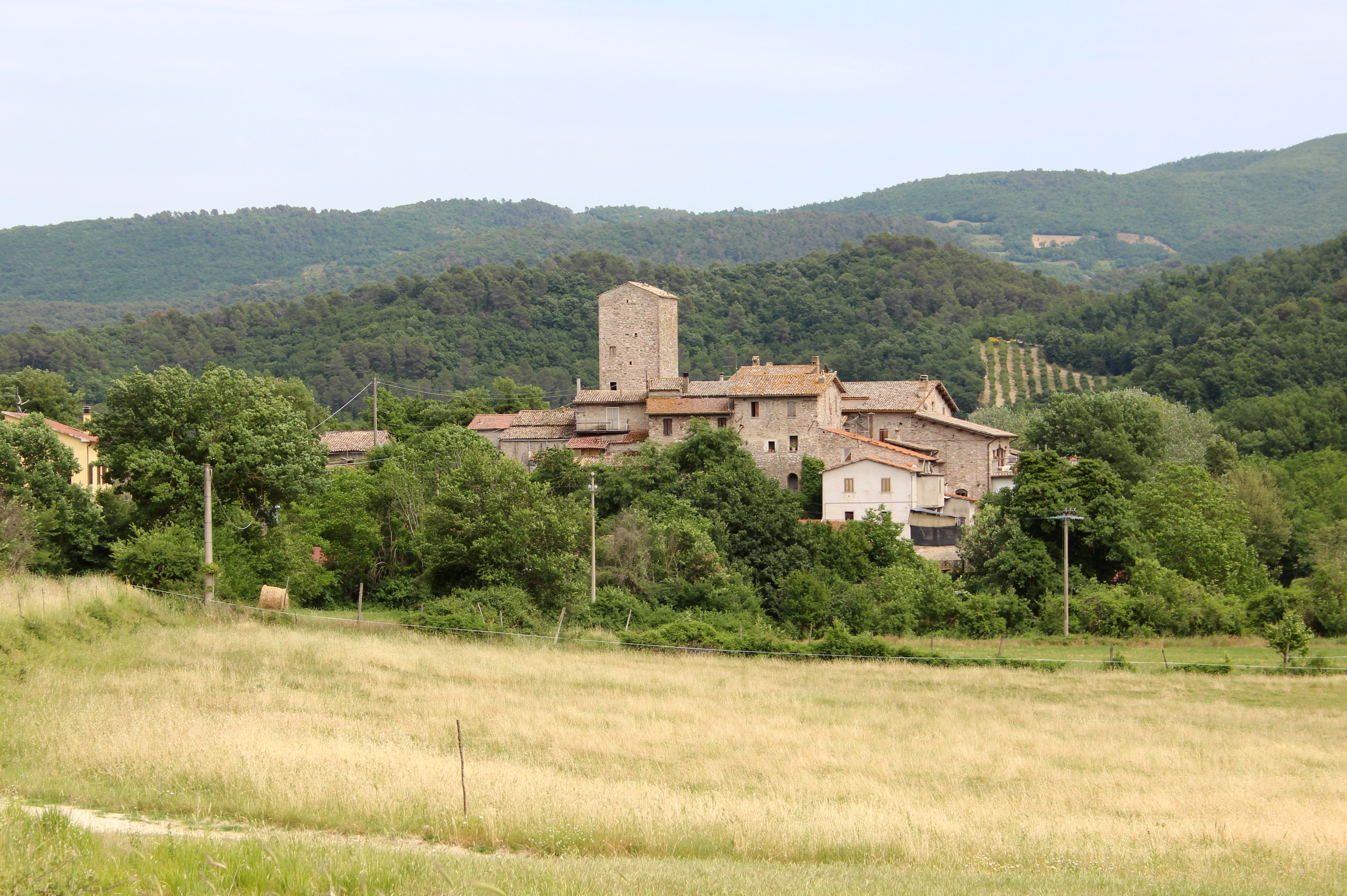
Arezzo di Spoleto

Arezzo di Spoleto (commonly referred to simply as Arezzo) is a small medieval village located a few kilometers west of Spoleto, Umbria.

Today part of the municipal territory of Spoleto, it preserves remains of medieval fortifications and is situated near Lake Arezzo, formed in the 20th century after the damming of the Maroggia stream.

== History ==
The origins of Arezzo di Spoleto are uncertain, though documentary mentions date back at least to the 13th century. After the Ghibelline victory at the Battle of Montaperti in 1260, the area was involved in conflicts between Guelph and Ghibelline factions. The region known as Terre Arnolfe, comprising Spoleto, Terni, Narni, and Todi, included the settlement of Aretio/Arezzo and remained under ecclesiastical administration for centuries.

In the early 14th century, Bishop Guido Tarlati of Arezzo supported Ghibelline revolts against the Papacy. In 1319 he sent his brother, Pier Saccone Tarlati, with German knights to take control of parts of Umbria, including Spoleto and nearby settlements. Though papal opposition culminated in Guido's excommunication in 1324, for a few years the Tarlati extended their dominion into this area, leaving possible traces in place names and local structures.

By 1342 the Ghibellines of Todi occupied Arezzo di Spoleto, and in the census of Cardinal Albornoz (1364) it appears under the jurisdiction of the castle of Gallicituolo (present-day Firenzuola), together with nearby Messenano and Arsicciali.

A papal bull of Alexander VI from 1502 records Arezzo among other localities, and in the 17th century it counted five hearths, indicating a small but stable community. In the Papal census of 1853, Arezzo is listed with a population of 72 inhabitants.

In 1964 the damming of the torrente Maroggia created Lake Arezzo. While the village itself was not submerged, nearby rural houses and structures, such as the Molino di Arezzo, were partly inundated and occasionally reemerge when water levels drop.

== Architecture and remains ==
The village is located on a modest height and retains traces of its defensive walls, now in decay. Surviving features include an ogival arch, part of the late medieval circuit, and a slender quadrangular tower with elevated entrance.

Nearby stood the fortified site of Palazzo (today known as Castellaccio), originally associated with the Equitani family of Cesi and later transformed into a noble residence.

== Religion ==
Within the village stands the Church of Saint Anthony of Padua, a subsidiary church belonging to the parish of Santa Maria in Rupis in the Archdiocese of Spoleto-Norcia.
