= Titignano, Orvieto =

Titignano
- Frazione
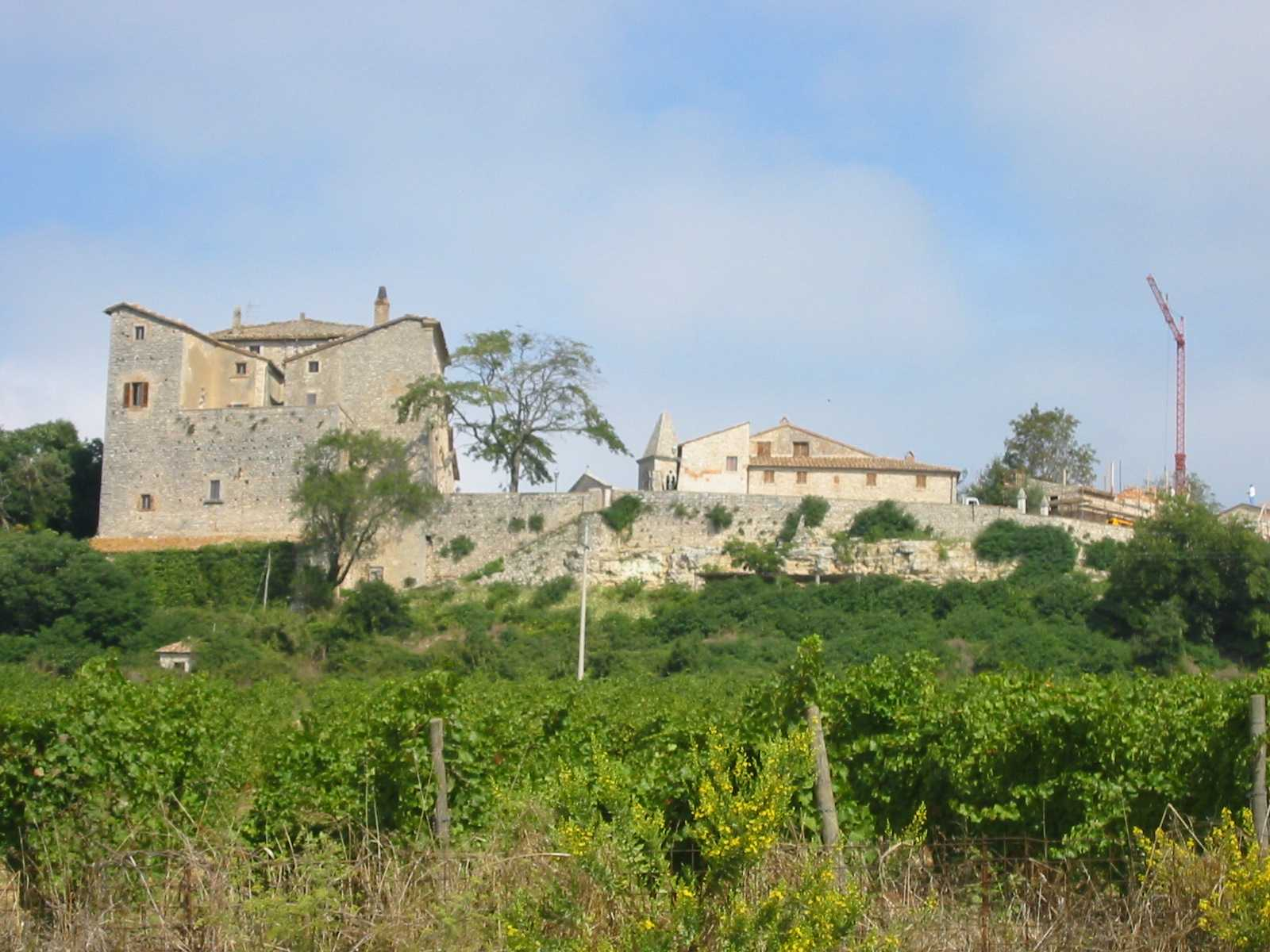
- View of the castle of Titignano

- Location of Titignano in Italy
- Coordinates: 42°45′29″N 12°17′18″E
- Country: Italy
- Region: Umbria
- Province: Terni (TR)
- Comune: Orvieto
- Elevation: 488 m (1,601 ft)

Population (1991)
  - Total: 11
- Time zone: UTC+1 (CET)
  - Summer (DST): UTC+2 (CEST)
- Postal code: 05018
- Dialing code: (+39) 0763

Titignano is a village in Umbria, central Italy, administratively a frazione of the comune of Orvieto, province of Terni.

Titignano is about 63 km from Terni and 30 km from Orvieto, and it's located north to the Corbara Lake in the Natural Reserve of the Tiber.

In 1991 the settlement had a population of 11. It does not appear as a separate locality in subsequent census records.

== History ==
The Montemarte family, an ancient and noble house of Orvieto, possessed the fief of Titignano from at least the 9th century.

In 1701, Titignano was a feudal domain of Count Montemarte. At the time, it had a population of 196. By 1803, it had passed to Count Ansidei. In 1817, it was recorded as belonging to Count Ludovico Ansidei.

In the mid-19th century, Titignano was a possession of Prince Corsini.

== Geography ==
Titignano is situated in an elevated position on a hill, commanding a very wide view over a landscape of rugged, rocky mountains interspersed with dense woodland. These wooded areas were once used for royal pigeon hunting.

The surrounding territory is described as sterile and stony, producing mainly spelt and rye.

== Religion and culture ==
The parish church of Maria Santissima Assunta stands within the settlement, which consists of a large square surrounded by houses. Saint Joseph is venerated as co-patron of the community.

== Notable people ==
Titignano was the birthplace of Fra Nallo (Reginaldo) di Montemarte, a nobleman born there in 1291. He became prior of the convent at Piperno, where he died in 1348. He was reputed to have performed miracles.
