= Poreta =

Poreta is a village in the municipality of Spoleto, in the region of Umbria, Italy. As of 2021, it had a population of 143. The village is situated at an elevation of 341 metres (1,119 ft) above sea level. It lies between Spoleto, Campello, and the Springs of Clitunno.

== History ==
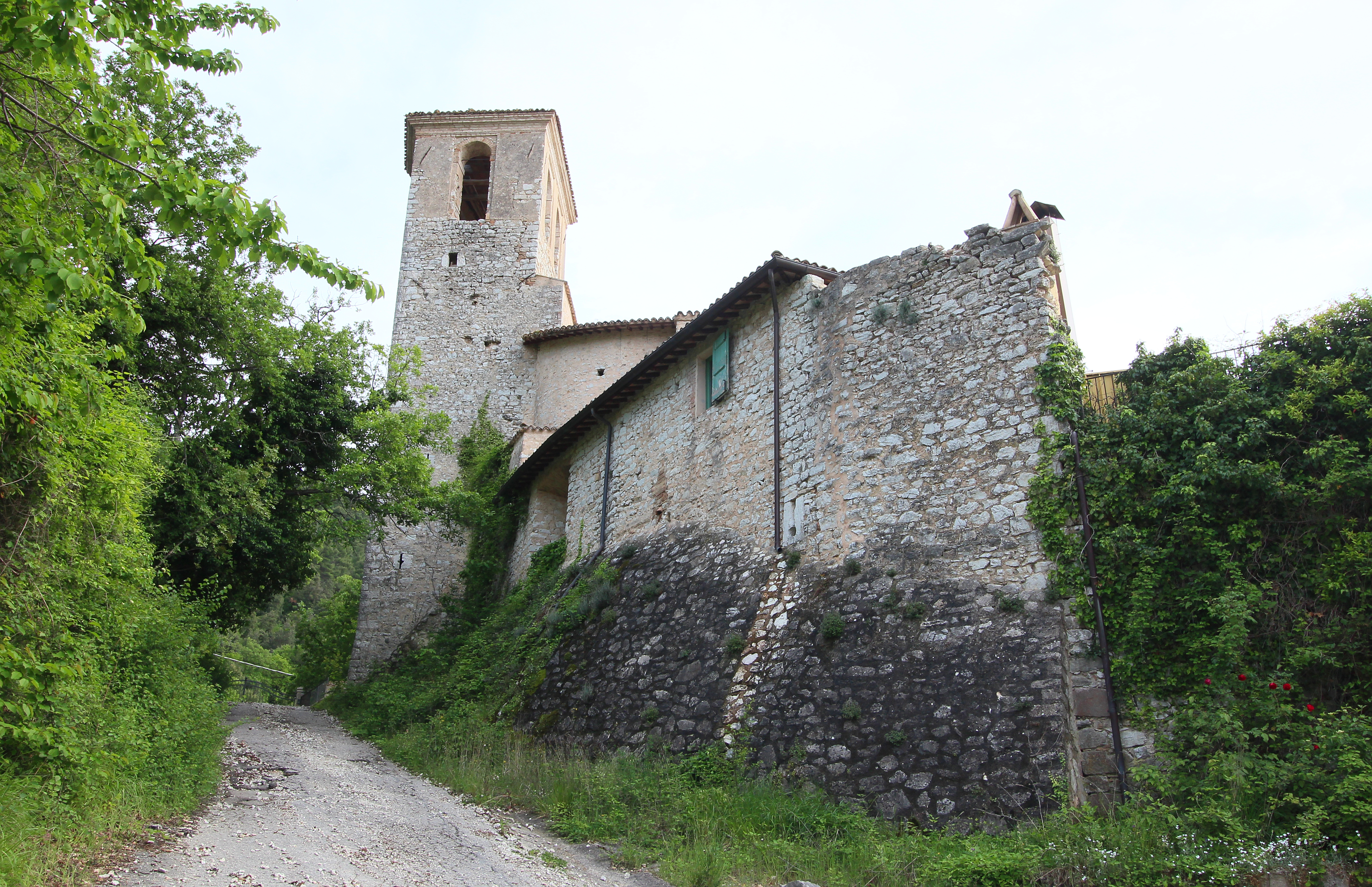
Castle of Poreta

Poreta originated as a villa and became a fortified village toward the end of the 13th century. In the second half of the 15th century, because of repeated raids by mercenary companies, a circuit of walls was built around the older settlement. The result was a compact built-up center of houses joined closely together, which became the focal point of a wider settlement spread across the slope and the plain of Spoleto.

In the second half of the 18th century, after a violent earthquake, the castle was gradually abandoned. The inhabitants built their houses outside the walls, reusing stones from the destroyed buildings.

== Religion and culture ==
The church of San Cristoforo, built after the castle, was later dedicated to Santa Maria della Misericordia because of a miraculous image of the Madonna kept inside it and said to have remained unharmed by earthquake damage.
