= Lubriano =

- Comune
- Comune di Lubriano
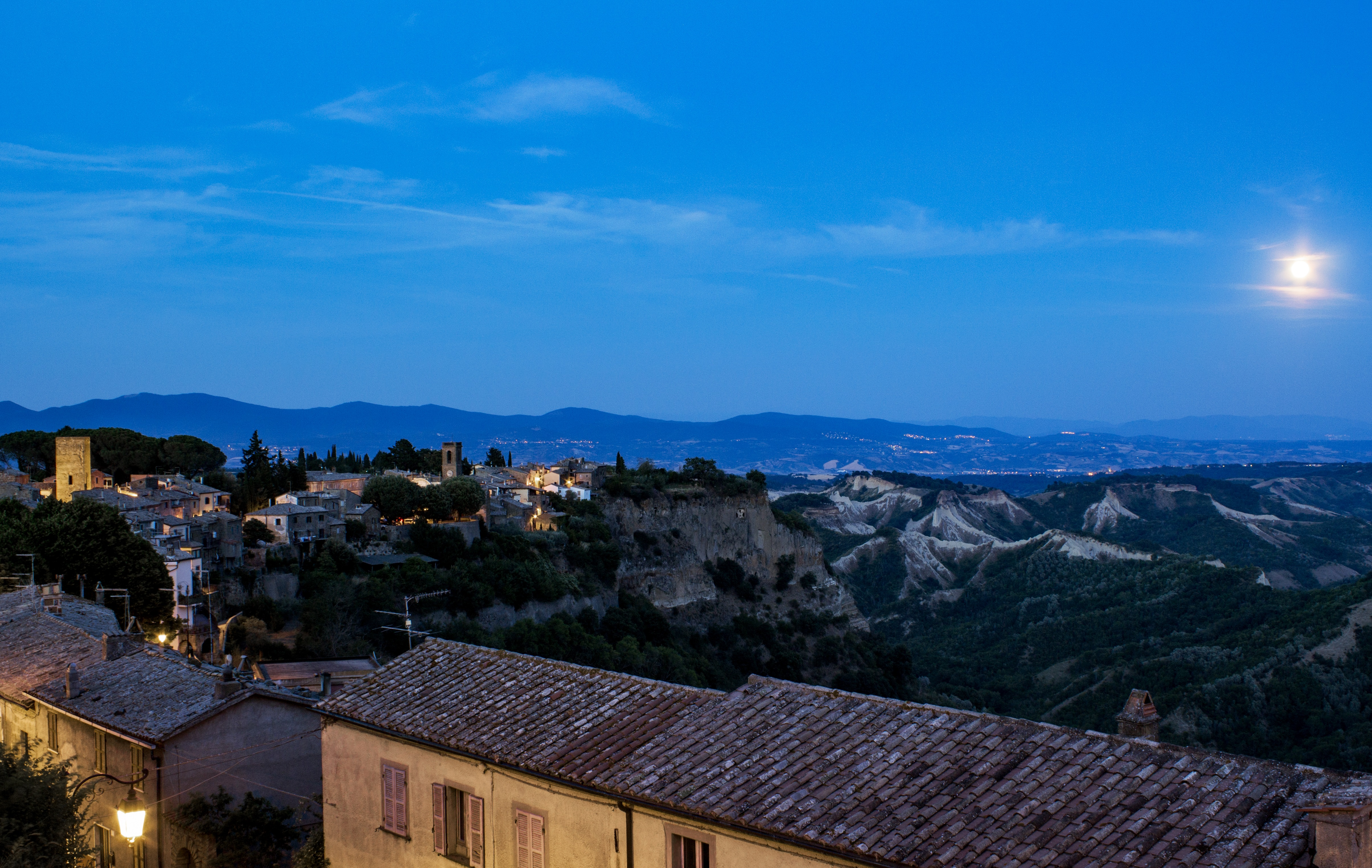

- Location within Italy Location within Lazio
- Coordinates: 42°38′N 12°6′E
- Country: Italy
- Region: Lazio
- Province: Viterbo (VT)

Government
  - Mayor: Valentino Gasparri

Area
  - Total: 16.61 km^{2} (6.41 sq mi)
- Elevation: 441 m (1,447 ft)

Population (30 September 2017)
  - Total: 894
  - Density: 53.8/km^{2} (139/sq mi)
- Demonym: Lubrianesi
- Time zone: UTC+1 (CET)
  - Summer (DST): UTC+2 (CEST)
- Postal code: 01020
- Dialing code: 0761
- Patron saint: St. Proculus
- Website: Official website

Lubriano is a comune (municipality) of about 900 inhabitants in the Province of Viterbo in the Italian region of Latium, located about 90 kilometres (56 mi) northwest of Rome and about 25 kilometres (16 mi) north of Viterbo.

Lubriano borders the following municipalities: Bagnoregio, Castiglione in Teverina, Orvieto and Porano.
