= Monteleone =

Monteleone (Italian pronunciation: [monteleˈoːne]) may refer to:

- Monteleone (surname), an Italian surname
- Monteleone chariot, an Etruscan chariot
- Hotel Monteleone, a hotel in New Orleans, Louisiana, United States of America

== Places ==
- Monteleone d'Orvieto, Italian comune
- Monteleone di Calabria (now Vibo Valentia), Italian comune
- Monteleone di Fermo, Italian comune
- Monteleone di Puglia, Italian comune
- Monteleone di Spoleto, Italian comune
- Monteleone Rocca Doria, Italian comune
- Monteleone Sabino, Italian comune
- Inverno e Monteleone, Italian comune
