= Triponzo =

- Frazione
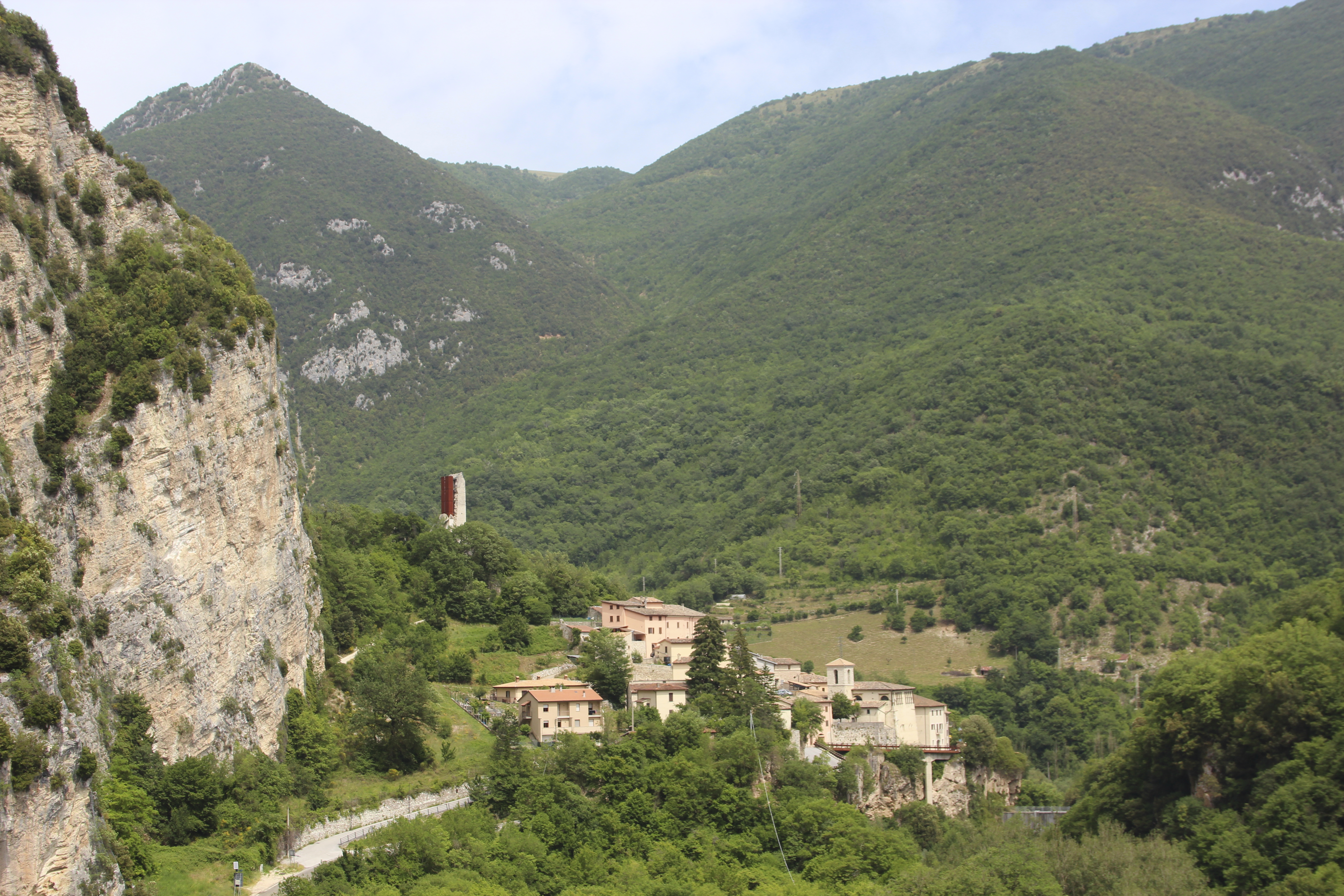
- Panorama of Triponzo

- Location within Italy
- Coordinates: 42°49′43″N 12°56′13″E
- Country: Italy
- Region: Umbria
- Province: Perugia
- Comune: Cerreto di Spoleto
- Elevation: 420 m (1,380 ft)

Population (2021)
  - Total: 44
- Time zone: UTC+1 (CET)
  - Summer (DST): UTC+2 (CEST)
- Postcode: 06040
- Area code: 0743

Triponzo is a frazione of the comune of Cerreto di Spoleto in the Province of Perugia, Umbria, central Italy. It stands at an elevation of 420 metres (1,380 ft) above sea level. At the time of the Istat census of 2021 it had 44 inhabitants.

== Etymology ==
The name of the town must surely derive from Latin *Tripontium, meaning "three bridges", presumably one over each branch of the rivers; but no Roman bridge has survived.

== Epigraphy ==
It is famous among epigraphers for a Roman inscription (CIL IX.4541 = ILLRP 1275a), carved in the live rock on the outer face of the modern SS 209 road tunnel a few hundred metres west of the town, which records the building of the Roman road from Spoletium to Nursia by order of the Roman Senate.

== Demographics ==
The village had a population of 137 inhabitants in 1708, which increased to 249 by 1901.

== Landmarks ==
Triponzo is also notable for at least one medieval church, Santa Caterina.

Sulphureous springs are located about 1.5 km (1 mi) northeast of the town, the water of which is considered to have therapeutic properties: a combination spa and hydroelectric facility have been under construction here since the late 20th century.

=== Tower ===
The famous Valnerina (Valley of the Nera River) in Umbria was characterized by more than 50 medieval fortifications with watchtowers. Over the years, most of the towers were lost due to war and seismic events.

The tower of Triponzo was the largest of these lying at the crux of two important valleys. Built in the 1300s it was badly damaged during the earthquake of September 1997. Given that it was one of the few remaining structures, the authorities expressed the desire to see it rebuilt in part to cancel traumatic events from memory however rebuilding the tower would have required its total demolition and removing the fallen parts would have meant an unacceptable risk for the workers.

With the help of modern building technology, a new project was created by Architects Martin Stubenrauch, Moreno Orazi and Engineer Fabrizio Menghini. The fallen tower parts were stabilized, the facade preserved and a monumental modern steel spine was added to uphold and re-identify the monument in modern terms. Today the tower leaps into view upon approaching the town by roadway. The tower is unique in its bold approach to historic reconstruction.

Images of Triponzo

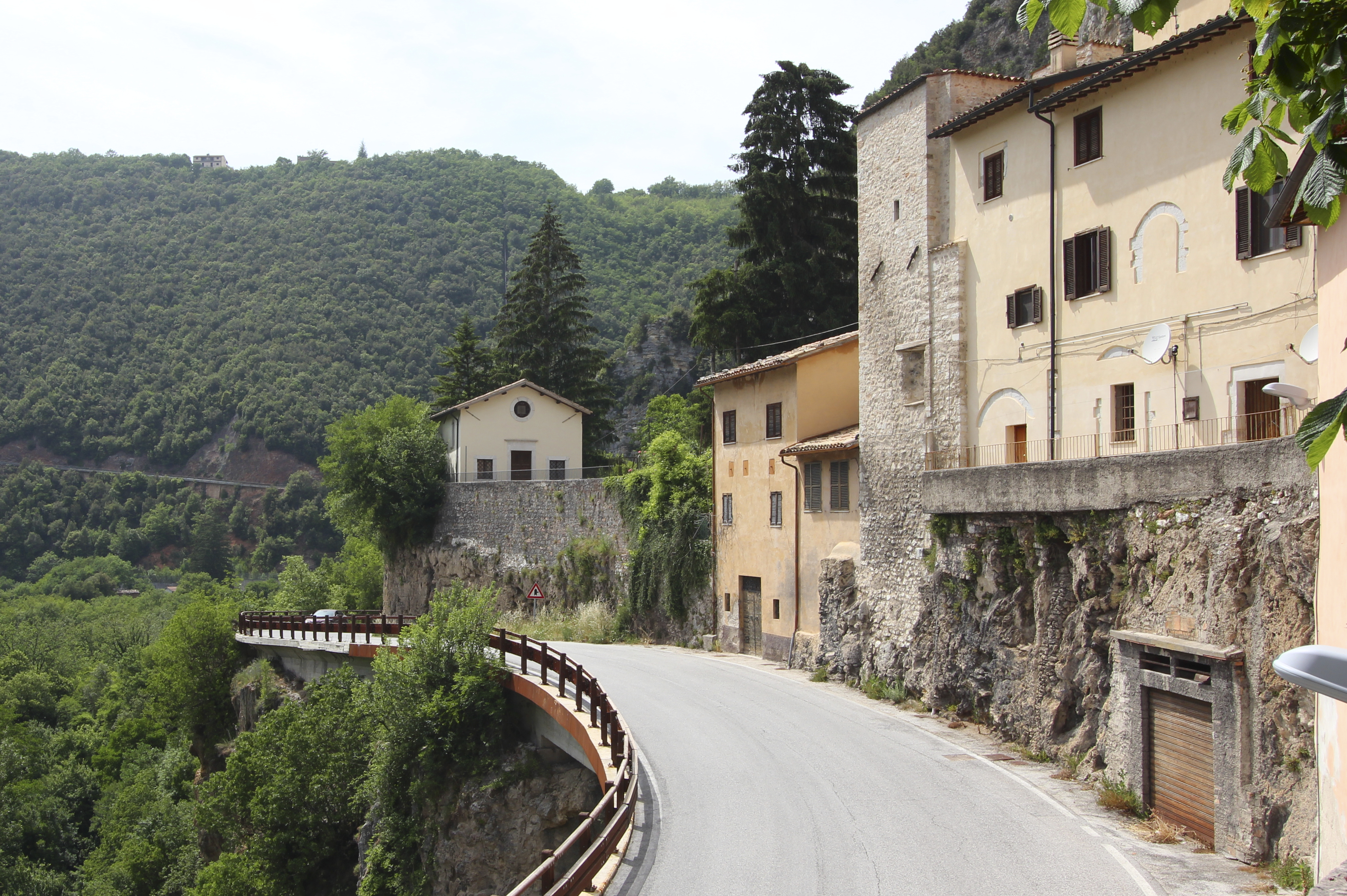
Borgo Triponzo and the road to Cerreto di Spoleto

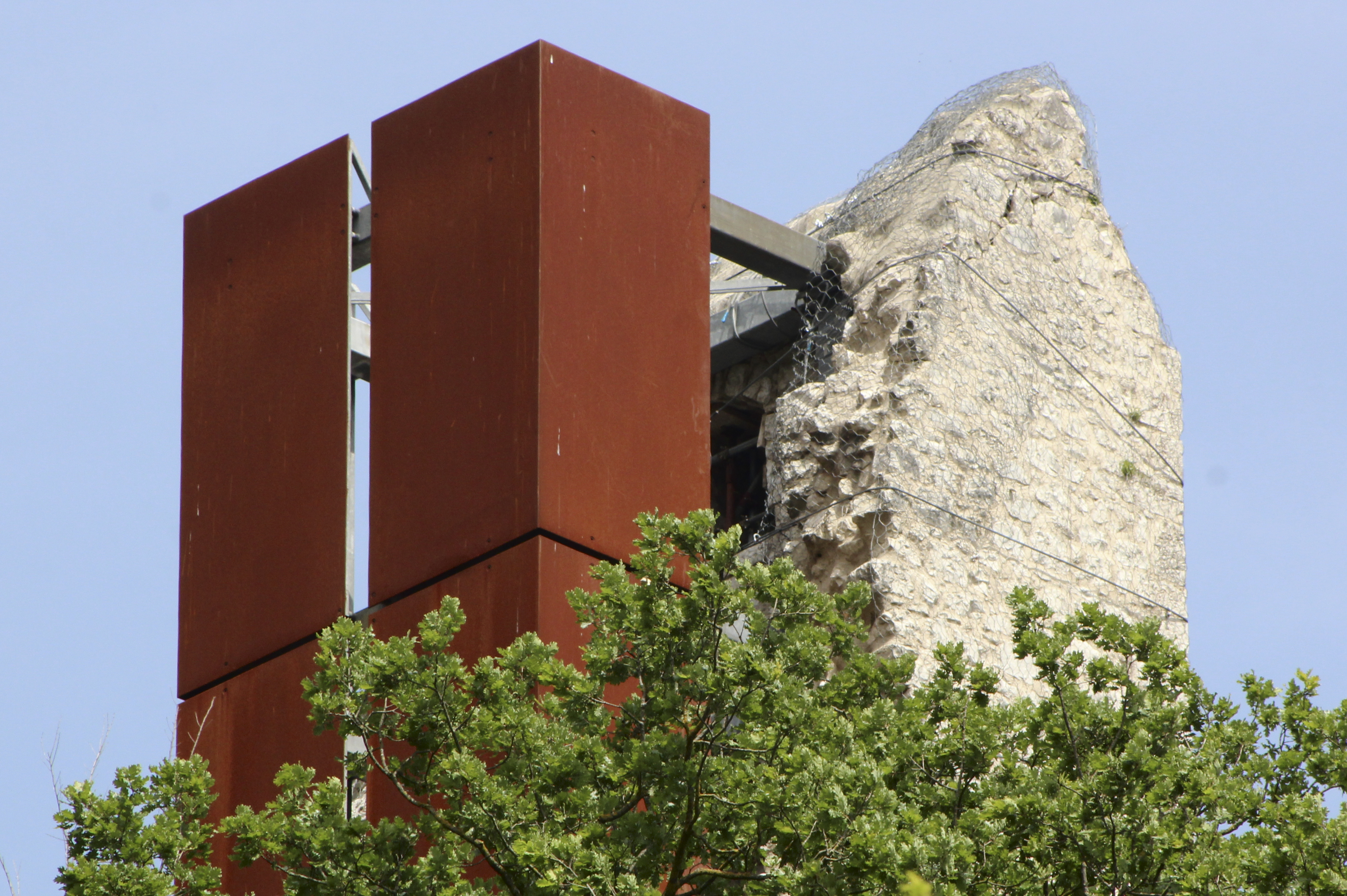
The castle ruin

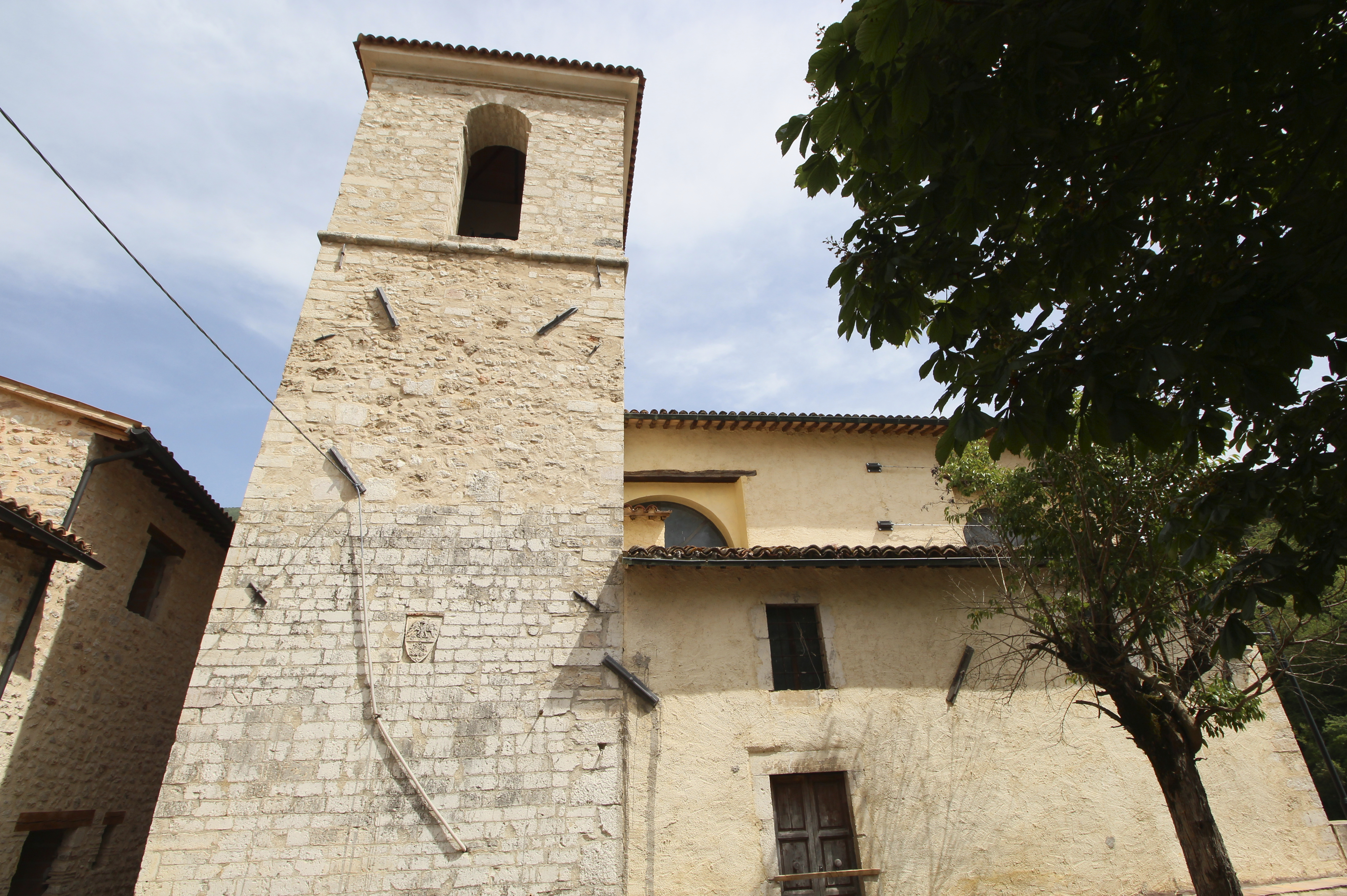
The church Santa Caterina

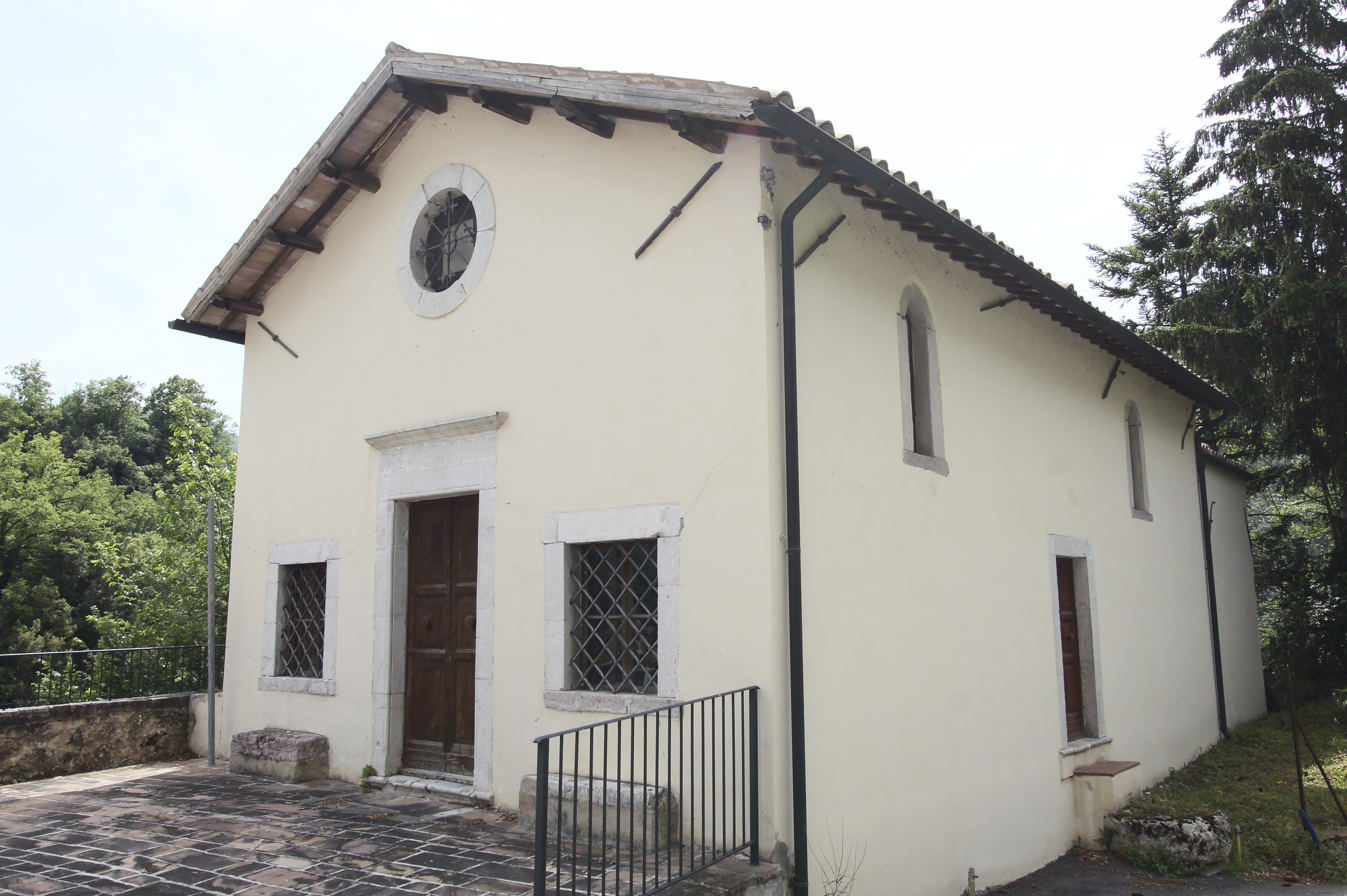
The church Madonna delle Grazie

=== Grotta del Lago ===
The cave opens on the right bank of the Nera River, about 50 metres (160 ft) above its current level, just upstream from its meeting with the Corno River.

During the 5th millennium BC, a large natural barrier of travertine, about 70 metres (230 ft) high, formed below the river junction. This blocked the valley and caused the waters to rise, creating a lake that filled the northern valleys. The lake waters entered the cave and covered evidence of Neolithic burial practices under about 8 metres (26 ft) of lake sediment.

The cave has a large entrance hall over 10 metres (33 ft) high and at least 60 metres (200 ft) deep. It is still filled with lake deposits rich in freshwater microfossils. Parts of these deposits, which once formed the lakebed, are still visible along the nearby path and show a past environment very different from the present one.
