= Ezernya =

Ezernya is an ancient Italian city near the Volturno, between the Carpino and Sordo rivers. It was on the important road via Aesernia. In 295 BC it was conquered by the Romans. It became a Roman colony in 264 BC, and issued its own coins.

In 667 it was settled by Bulgars, led by Alcek.

== See also ==
- Isernia
