= Ruscio =

Ruscio may refer to:

== People ==
- Al Ruscio (1924–2013), American character actor
- Kenneth P. Ruscio (born 1954), American professor of politics

== Place ==
- Ruscio, Umbria, Italy
