= Monteleone (surname) =

Monteleone is an Italian surname. Notable people with the surname include:

- Davide Monteleone, photographer
- Enzo Monteleone (born 1954), film director and screenwriter
- Rich Monteleone (born 1963), Major League Baseball pitcher and coach
- Thomas F. Monteleone (born 1946), science fiction and horror fiction author

== See also ==
- Monteleone (disambiguation)
