= Sordo (river) =

Location
- Country: Italy

Physical characteristics
- Mouth: Corno
  - location: Serravalle di Norcia
  - coordinates: 42°47′08″N 13°01′13″E

Basin features
- Progression: Corno→ Nera→ Tiber→ Tyrrhenian Sea

The Sordo is a small river in eastern Umbria in Italy. Its source is about 1 km south of Norcia at an approximate altitude of 600 m (1950 ft), and it flows for about 7 km (4.3 mi) west to Serravalle where it empties into the Corno and river Nera.
