= Corno (river) =

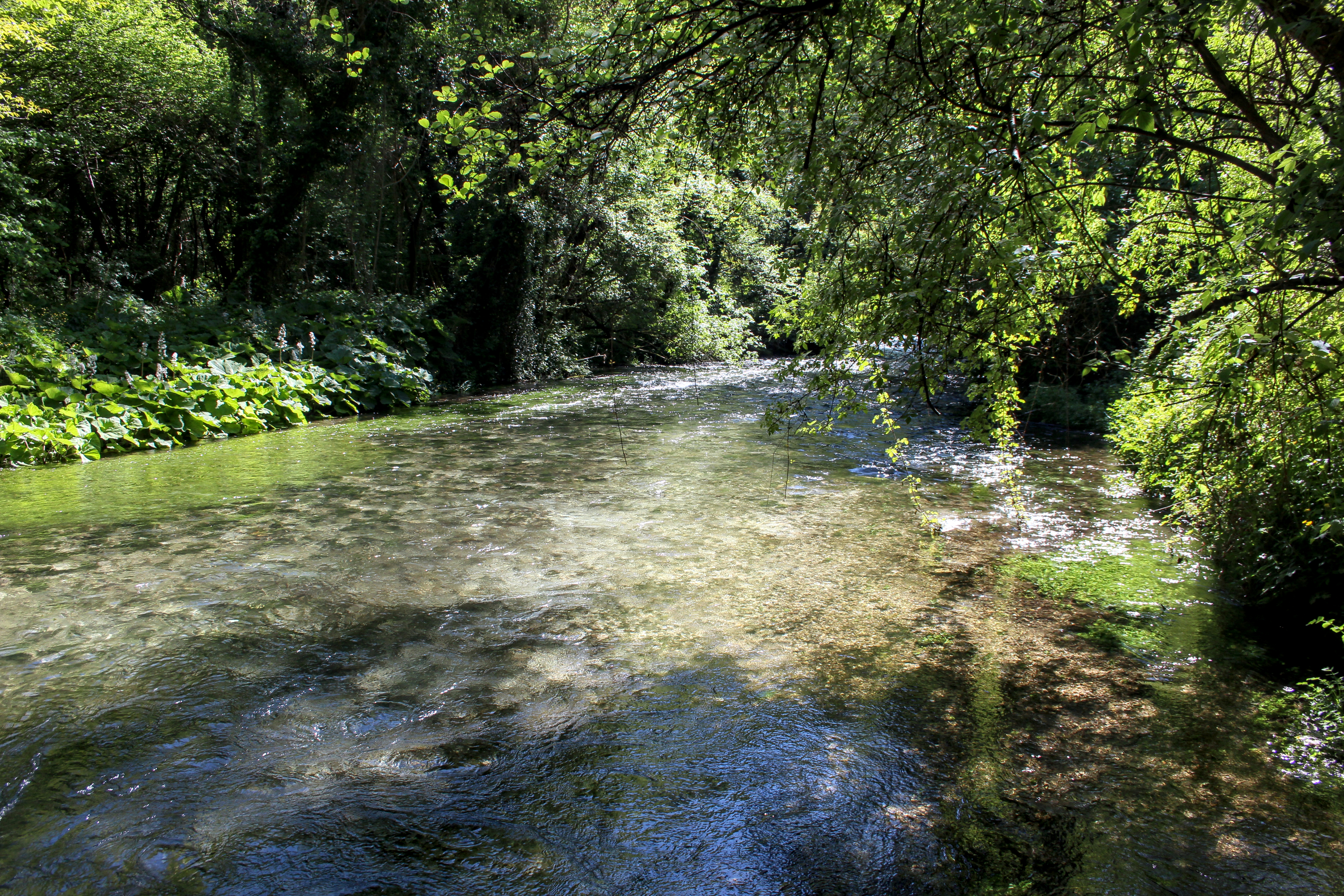

Location
- Country: Italy

Physical characteristics
- Mouth: Nera
  - location: Triponzo
  - coordinates: 42.8273°N 12.9377°E

Basin features
- Progression: Nera→ Tiber→ Tyrrhenian Sea

The Corno is a small river of the northern Lazio and eastern Umbria in Italy. Its source is on the upper slopes of Mount Corno, at an approximate altitude of 1700 m (5575 ft), and it flows for about 60 km (37 mi), almost always due north, past the towns of Leonessa, Ocre, Ruscio, Monteleone di Spoleto, Roccaporena, Cascia to Serravalle where it receives the waters of the Sordo; from there the last 11 km in a northwesterly direction to Triponzo, where it flows into the Nera at 420 m (1378 ft) altitude. Of the towns mentioned, only Serravalle and Triponzo are actually on the river, since in its upper course the Corno's torrential nature is not such as to make it safe for the siting of towns.
