= Monteleone di Spoleto =

- Comune
- Comune di Monteleone di Spoleto
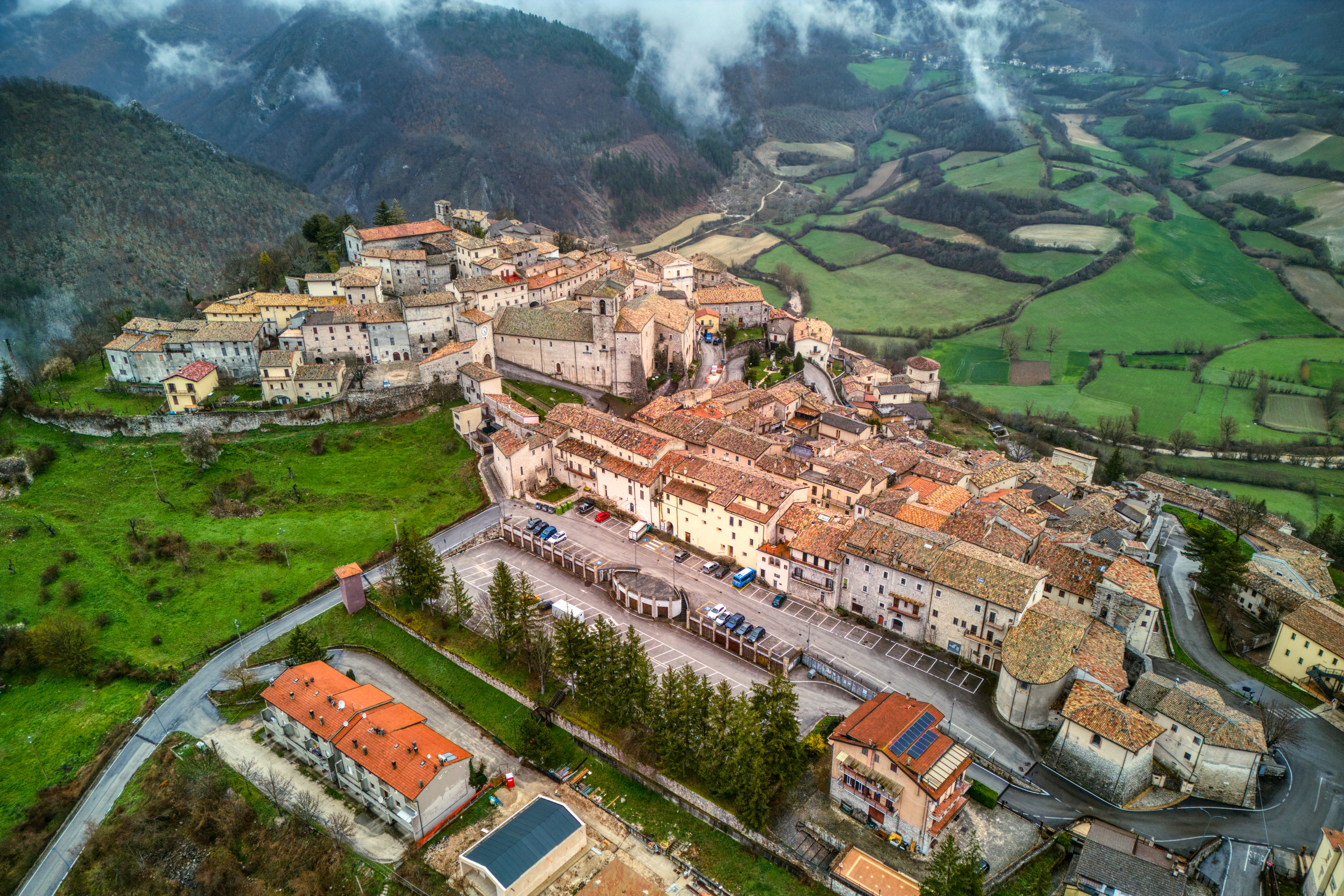
- View of Monteleone di Spoleto

- Coat of arms

- Location within Italy Location within Umbria
- Coordinates: 42.651593°N 12.951839°E
- Country: Italy
- Region: Umbria
- Province: Perugia (PG)

Government
  - Mayor: Marisa Angelini

Area
  - Total: 61.58 km^{2} (23.78 sq mi)
- Elevation: 978 m (3,209 ft)

Population (1 January 2025)
  - Total: 539
  - Density: 8.75/km^{2} (22.7/sq mi)
- Demonym: Monteleonesi
- Time zone: UTC+1 (CET)
  - Summer (DST): UTC+2 (CEST)
- Postal code: 06045
- Dialing code: 0743
- Patron saint: St. Nicholas
- Saint day: 6 December
- Website: Official website

Monteleone di Spoleto is a town and comune in the province of Perugia, in southeastern Umbria. It stands at 978 meters (3,209 ft) above sea level, overlooking the upper valley of the Corno River. It is included among I Borghi più belli d'Italia ("The Most Beautiful Villages of Italy").

In 2021 the municipality had a population of 539 inhabitants.

== History ==
Monteleone was said to have been founded around the year 250 by a Tiberto degli Arroni. The settlement was later fortified by the Spoletans, who surrounded it with walls and restored its fortress.

Little remains of the Roman settlement. The town was destroyed and rebuilt by the Spoletans in the 12th century and today retains a predominantly medieval character.

In 1326 the community was erected as a free comune and, by decree of the Holy See, removed from the jurisdiction of Spoleto. During the 14th century its territory was organized into three terzieri, named San Nicola, Santa Maria and San Giacomo.

In 1527 the town was directly occupied by Spoleto, and a military garrison was installed. In the early 1540s it was incorporated into the Governorate of Norcia, Cascia, Cerreto and Monteleone, and a podestà-commissario was appointed. Between the 1540s and 1560 a succession of podestà, commissari and luogotenenti governed the community, appointed either by the pope or by the papal legate of Perugia.

Between 1560 and 1565 new municipal statutes were compiled. In 1569, under Pope Pius V, the Prefettura della Montagna was established.

During the Roman Republic of 1798 the town was assigned to the Canton of Cascia in the Department of Clitunno. After the fall of the Republic, the traditional magistracy of priori was reinstated and a vice governor appointed. In 1802 the town was reintegrated into the Prefettura della Montagna.

From 1809 to 1814, under French rule, a maire was introduced. The town was assigned to the Canton of Cascia, within the Circondario of Spoleto in the Department of Trasimeno. Following the collapse of Napoleonic authority in 1814, a provisional regency was established, and in 1815 the offices of luogotenente and priori were restored.

On 6 July 1816 the town was included in the Delegation of Spoleto. In 1833 the town became dependent on the Governor of Cascia, and the office of podestà ceased to be present locally.

In 1859 the municipality had a total population of 1,662 inhabitants. Of these, 270 people lived in the countryside, while the main settlement of Monte Leone contained 915 inhabitants. The remainder lived in three hamlets, which also served as parishes: Buttine (183 inhabitants), Ruscio (348 inhabitants), and Trivio (216 inhabitants).

== Geography ==
Monte Leone is situated on the banks of the Corno River. It lies about 5 miles (8.0 km) from Cascia. The surrounding landscape is largely mountainous and wooded, with abundant water and nearby springs. The climate was described as cold, with heavy snowfall in winter.

The town is among the more remote settlements in Umbria and lies along a mountain road linking Norcia (33 kilometres (21 mi) north-northeast) and Cascia (12 kilometres (7.5 mi) north-northeast) with Leonessa (10 kilometres (6.2 mi) south) and Rieti (51 kilometres (32 mi) south-southwest) in Lazio.

=== Subdivisions ===
The municipality includes the localities of Il Colle, Monteleone di Spoleto, Rescia, Ruscio, Trivio.

In 2021, 126 people lived in rural dispersed dwellings not assigned to any named locality. At the time, the most populous localities were Monteleone proper (245), Ruscio (83), and Trivio (73).

== Economy ==
The local economy historically combined agriculture and mining. The iron mines constituted a significant economic resource in the 17th century, supplying high-quality iron for major architectural works in Rome. The mines were located in wooded areas and were considered easy to excavate and smelt.

The territory produced grain, maize, barley, potatoes, hay and timber. In addition to agriculture and mineral extraction, the manufacture of earthenware was described as the principal local industry in the 19th century.

=== Ironworks ===
Iron mining has played an important role in the area's history. The mines of Monte Leone were reportedly opened in 1634 under Pope Urban VIII, although some sources claim they were known locally as early as 1496, as suggested by a document preserved in the Vatican Archives. In 1634 an ironworks was constructed from the ground up, a carriage road to the mines was opened, and a dam (known as the parata) was built on the Corno River to raise the water level and channel part of it to power the furnace.

The greatest productivity was achieved under Pope Clement IX. Iron from Monte Leone was used for major works in Rome, including various projects in the Vatican. In 1730 an earthquake devastated the surrounding area and destroyed the river dam, marking a decline in activity.

In 1795 additional iron mines were opened in the Apennine branches of the Roscio and Cornuvole mountains and at Gavelli, about 5 miles (8.0 km) from the town. These deposits consisted of brown hematite, easily smelted and producing a malleable and high-quality iron, though later efforts did not achieve lasting success.

It was traditionally claimed that the iron used to make the gates of the Pantheon in Rome (removed in 1882) came from Monteleone's mines. Activity continued successfully until the earthquake of 1730 damaged the river works that supplied water to the furnaces, leading to suspension of operations. Pope Pius VI later attempted to revive the enterprise, and during the French occupation renewed attention was given to the mines, including inspections by the geologist Scipione Breislak. After the fall of French rule, however, neglect led to gradual decline.

== Religion and culture ==
=== San Francesco ===
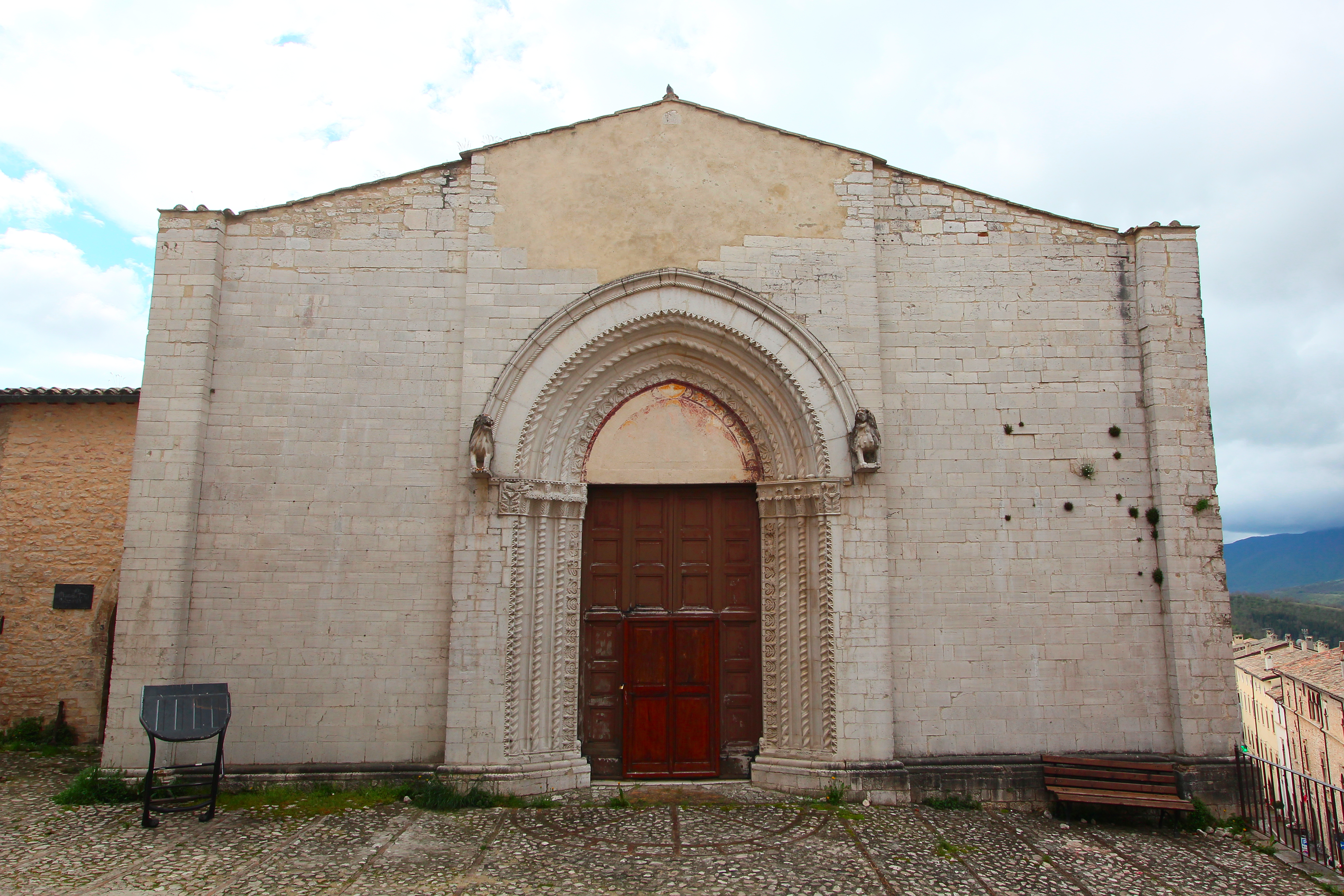
Church of San Francesco

The church of San Francesco was built in the 14th century over a 12th-century Benedictine oratory. Although titled to the Madonna dell'Assunta, it has been known as San Francesco since Franciscans settled there around 1280.

The complex was restored in the 15th century and then extensively altered after the January 1703 earthquake; between 1395 and 1398 the floor was raised, creating a lower worship space and reducing the original interior height by about one third, a change still visible where the floorline cuts across a Crucifixion fresco on the left wall. The north-facing façade retains a Romano-Gothic pointed portal with twisted columns and reliefs attributed to Lombard craftsmen, and a lunette fresco of Mary between Saint Francis of Assisi and Saint Nicholas.

Inside, two naves are divided by stone pillars; the main nave has a painted wooden ceiling by Giuseppe Frigerio da Norcia dated 1760, and surviving fresco cycles date from the 14th to the 16th centuries. The upper cloister preserves nine 18th-century tempera lunettes (first half of the 18th century) on the life of Saint Francis, and an antiquarium-like display with Roman, medieval, and modern fragments, including the Roman funerary inscription of Sextus Vettulenus found at Forca di Usigni (municipality of Poggiodomo).

The former lower church later served as a burial place and retains repainted Franciscan frescoes dated to the early 15th century; arcosolia have been brought to light on the right wall. The sacristy holds a 13th-century wooden Madonna and Child from Castevecchio.

=== Santa Caterina ===
The former convent and church of Santa Caterina is documented from 1310, when ten Augustinian nuns were granted a site near the castle walls, next to the chapel of Sant'Agnese outside the walls belonging to the parish church of San Nicola. After five years they moved to a new monastery built near San Giovanni al Borgo, later returning to the original site at an unknown date.

The church, now in ruins, was damaged in the 1703 earthquake but repaired and back in use by 1715. Its plan is described as an ovoid generated by four intersecting equilateral triangles. With the laws of 1866 the convent was suppressed, its property confiscated by the state, and the nuns moved to Cascia.

=== Torre dell'Orologio ===
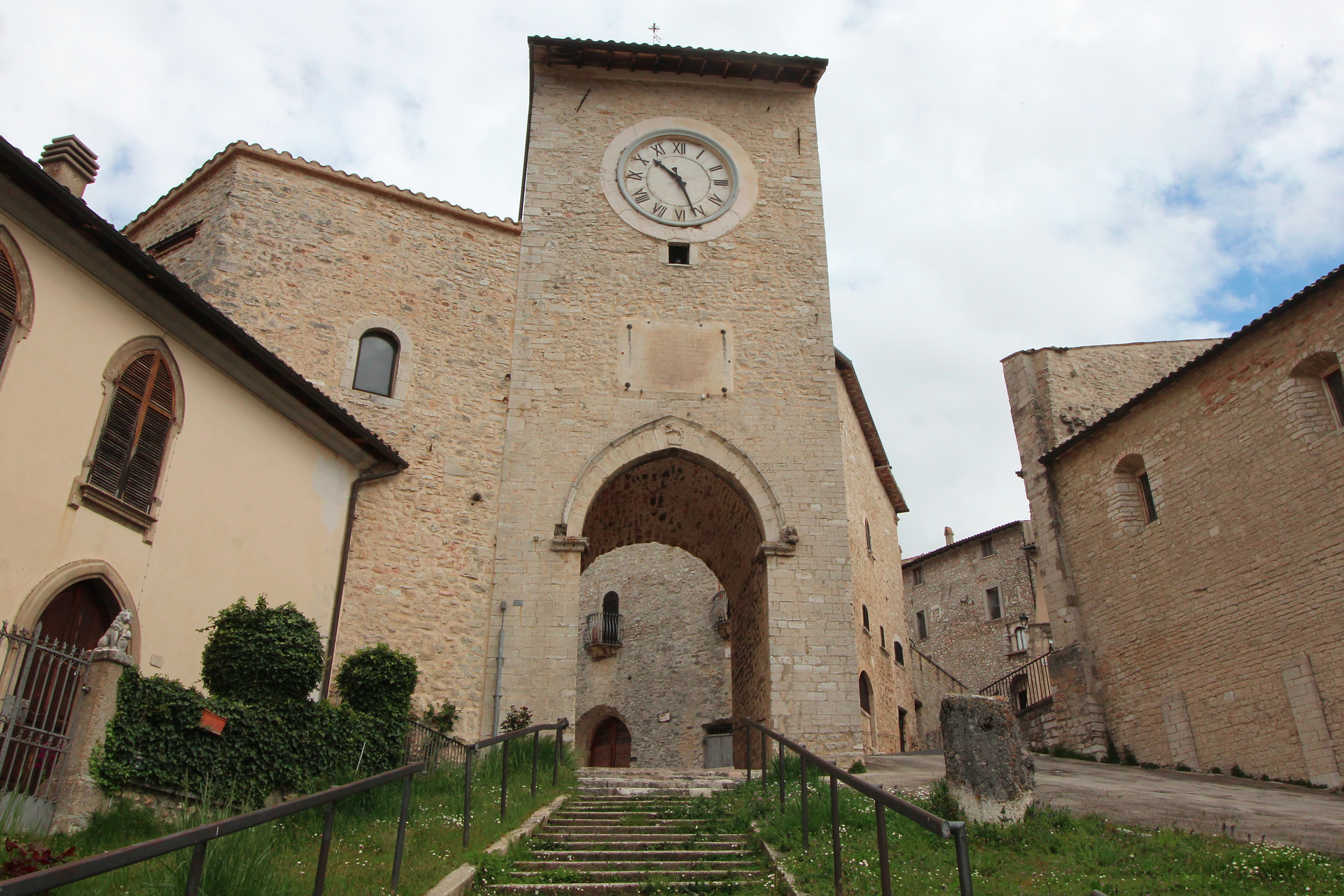
Torre dell'Orologio

Built around the 13th century, the Torre dell'Orologio is one of the three gates of the second circuit of walls. It stands at the entrance to the settlement and provides access to the church of San Francesco and to the oldest part of the historic center. From the tower there are views over the valley.

=== Monteleone chariot ===
Monteleone is associated with the Monteleone chariot, dated to around the middle of the 6th century BC. The artifact was found by chance in 1902 by Isidoro Vannozzi in a necropolis a few kilometers from the town at Colle del Capitano, where it had been placed in a tumulus tomb. The chariot is now kept at the Metropolitan Museum of New York, which bought it in 1903 from an antiques trafficker who had smuggled it out of the country.

The piece has been the subject of disputes between the museum and the municipal administration of Monteleone, which has sought its return. In Monteleone, a full-scale copy is on display. A permanent exhibition about the chariot presents the artifact, the circumstances of its discovery and removal, and objects from the funerary assemblage.

=== Other cultural heritage ===
Other notable buildings include additional medieval churches, the 15th-century Palazzo Bernabò, and surviving sections of the medieval walls, including a clock tower.

The town also preserves historical arms, including late 16th-century crossbows and a wrought-iron cannon composed of multiple joined sections, measuring 2.32 metres (7 ft 7 in) in length.
