= Monteleone chariot =

Etruscan chariot, c. 530 BC, at the Metropolitan Museum of Art

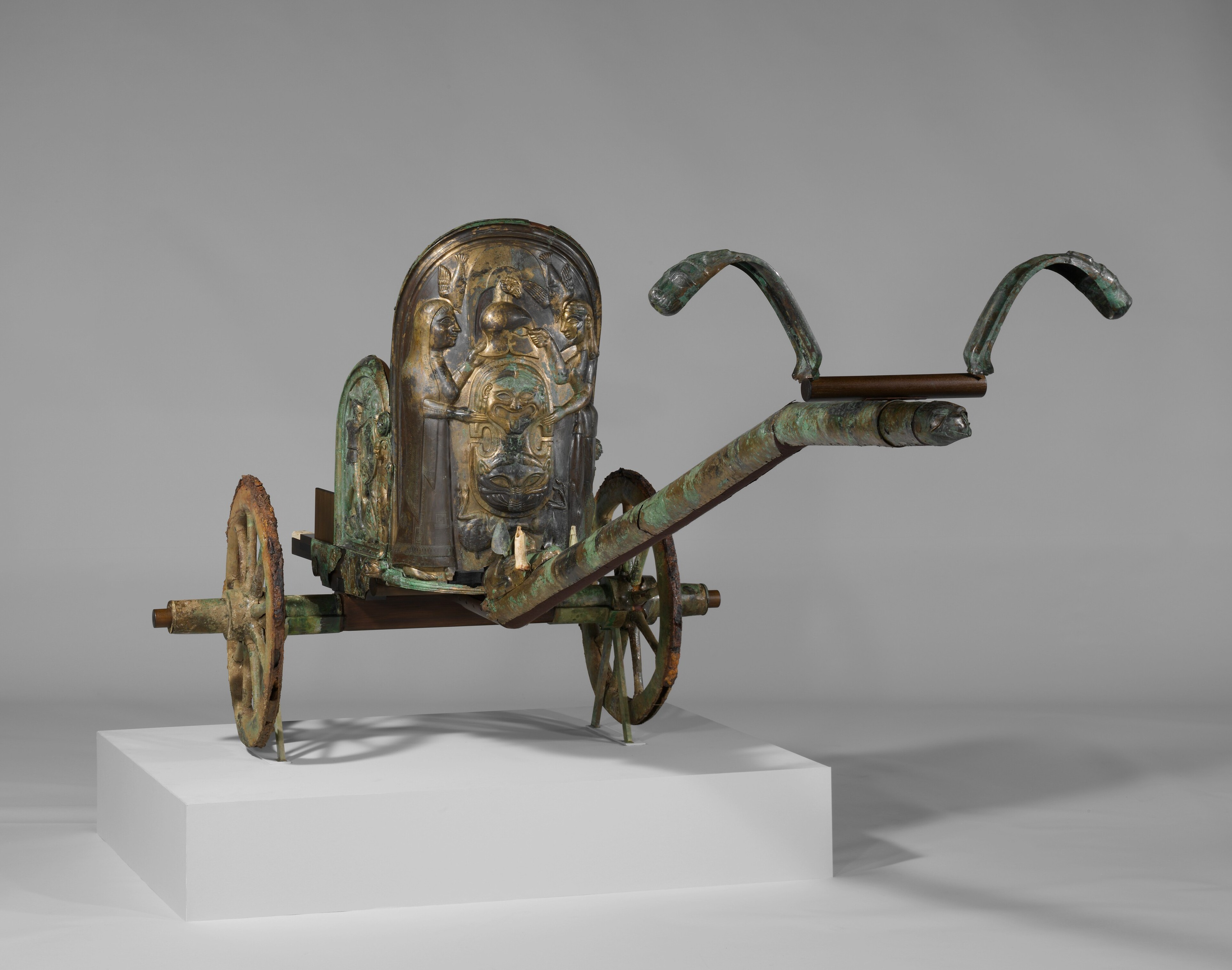
Monteleone chariot unearthed in Perugia, dated 530 BC.

The Monteleone chariot is an Etruscan chariot dated to c. 530 BC, considered one of the world's great archaeological finds. It was uncovered in 1902 in Monteleone di Spoleto, Umbria, Italy, in an underground tomb covered by a mound, and is currently a major attraction in the collection of the Metropolitan Museum of Art in New York City.

Though about 300 ancient chariots are known to still exist, only six are reasonably complete, and the Monteleone chariot is the best-preserved and most complete of all known surviving examples. Carlos Picón, curator of the museum's Greek and Roman department, has called it "the grandest piece of sixth-century Etruscan bronze anywhere in the world".

== Description ==
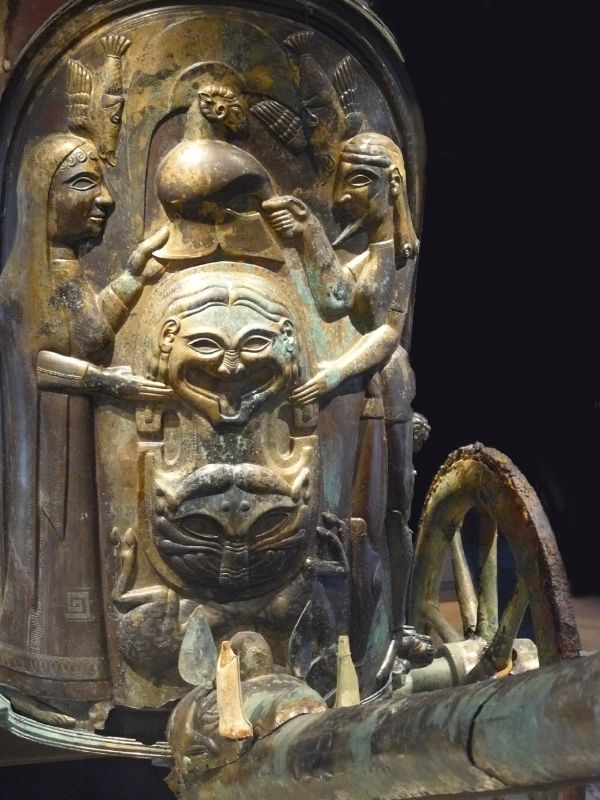
The central scene; Thetis hands Achilles his armor

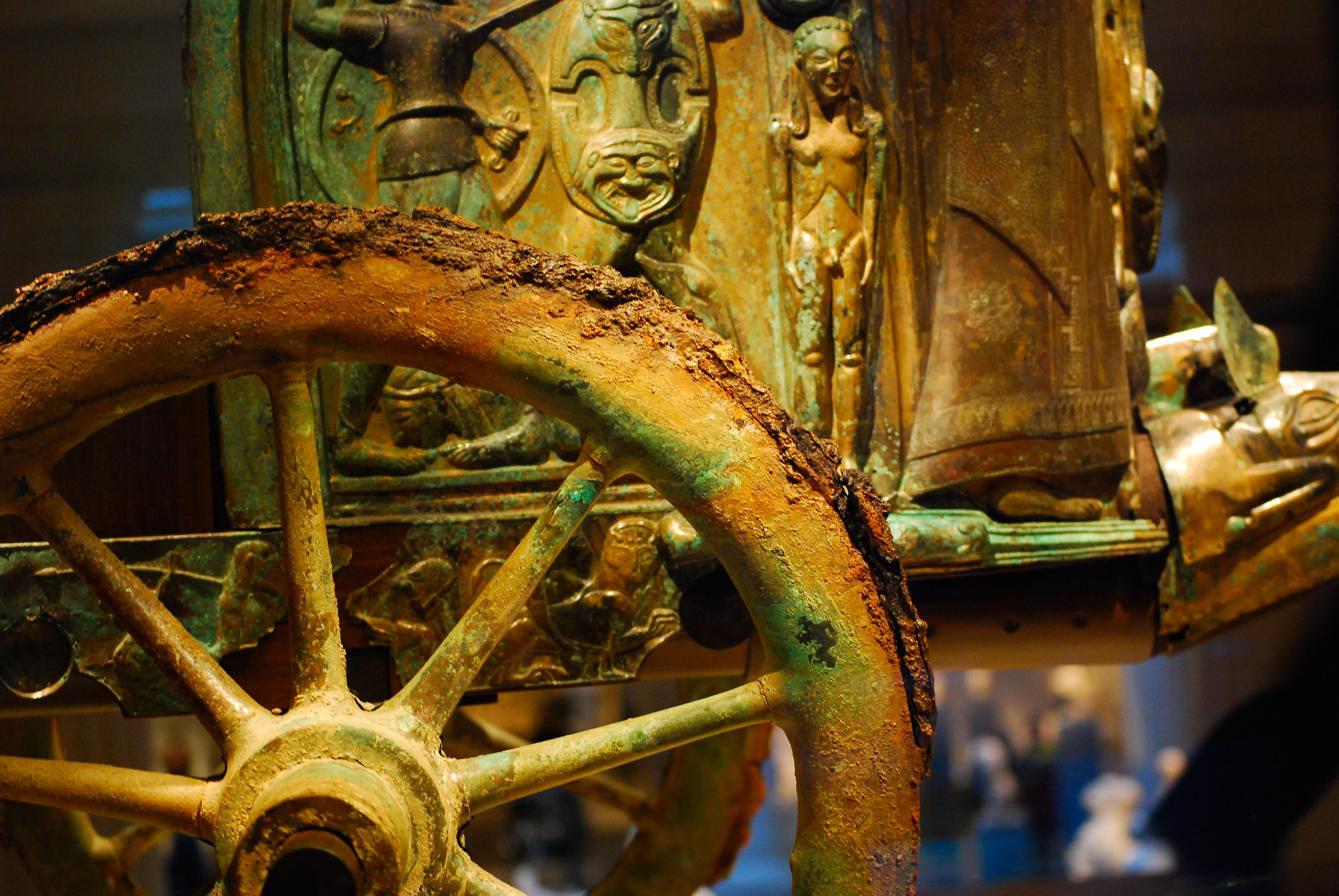
Close up on the wheel of the chariot.

The Monteleone chariot was part of a chariot burial, containing the remains of two human corpses, along with two drinking cups. Measuring 131 cm (51 5/8 in) in height and designed to be drawn by two horses, the chariot itself is constructed of wood covered with hammered bronze plates and carved ivory decoration. It is thought to be a "parade chariot" rather than one used in warfare.

The bronze plates are decorated with Homeric iconography in relief; the main panel depicts Achilles being handed his replacement armor by his mother, Thetis, after his first set had been fatally lent to Patroklos. Below the helmet is a shield decorated with a Gorgon's head. The left side panel shows two warriors in combat, thought to be Achilles and the Trojan ally Memnon. The right panel shows the apotheosis of Achilles, as he ascends in a chariot pulled by winged horses. The chariot's shaft emerges from the mouth of a boar; the dead deer below the shield may be meant to be shown carried by the boar. Rows of smaller scenes run along the base of the chariot platform. These are thought to show "Achilles as a youth in the care of the centaur Chiron and Achilles as a lion felling his foes, in this case, a stag and a bull". Two nude male figures flank the central scene.

The chariot's frame and plating are additionally adorned with animals and legendary creatures rendered in detail. The chariot's decorations would also have included inlaid amber and other exotic materials, but only the bronze and ivory decorations have survived. The chariot's wheels have nine spokes (rather than the classical Greek four, the Egyptian six, or the Assyrian and Persian eight; excavated chariots from Celtic burials have up to twelve spokes). Curators at the Museum had long suspected that the chariot's original 1903 reconstruction was not historically accurate. In 1989, under the direction of Italian archaeologist Adriana Emiliozzi, the Metropolitan Museum began a five-year reexamination and restoration of the chariot. During the restoration, it was discovered that the chariot had in fact been originally assembled incorrectly; additionally, evidence was uncovered indicating that the chariot, previously thought to have seen little actual use, had in fact been involved in a serious accident at some point during its life. The newly restored chariot opened to the public on April 20, 2007.

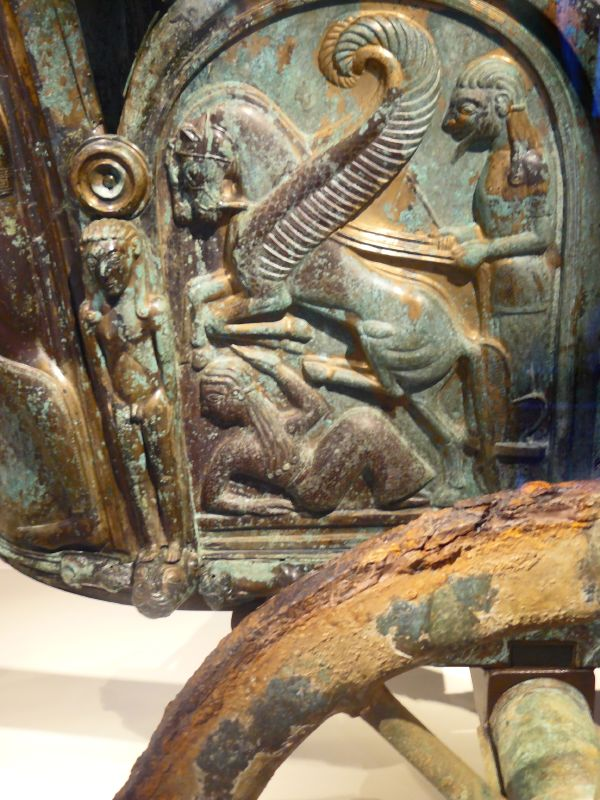
Apotheosis of Achilles

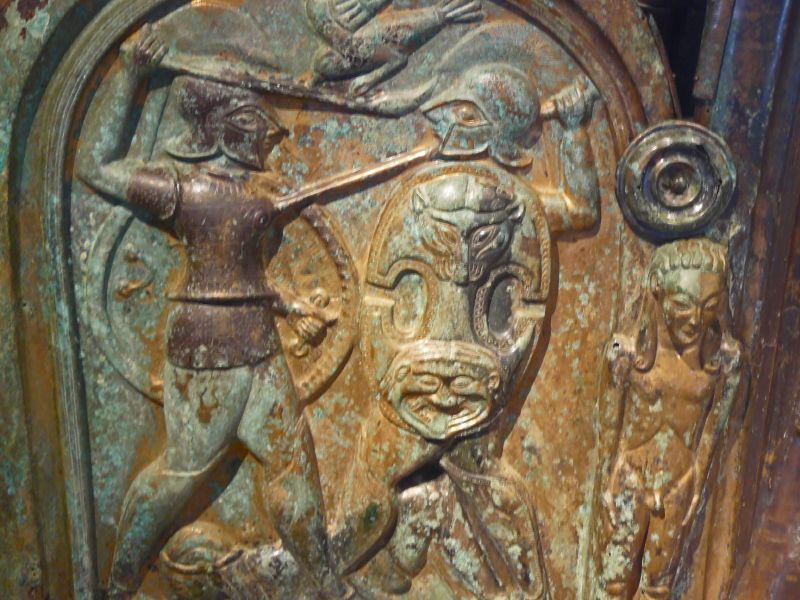
Combat between Achilles and Memnon

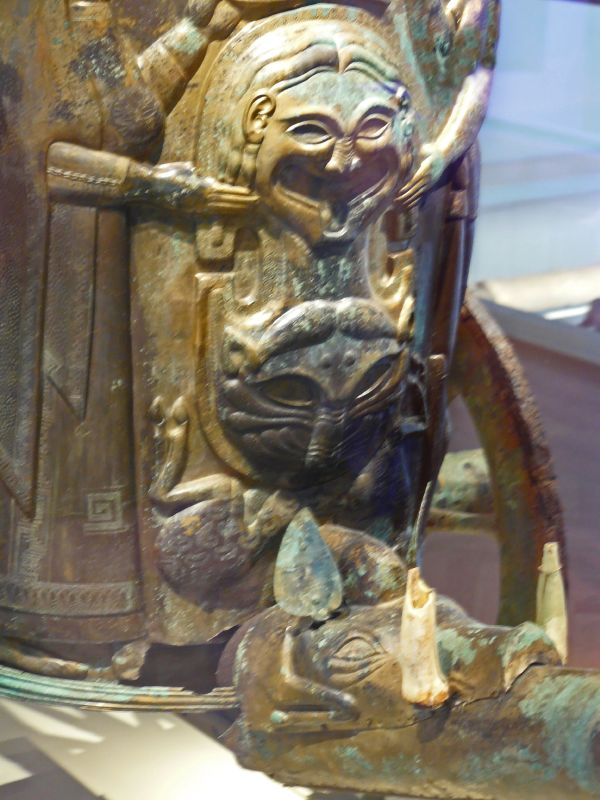
Shield, deer, and boar's head

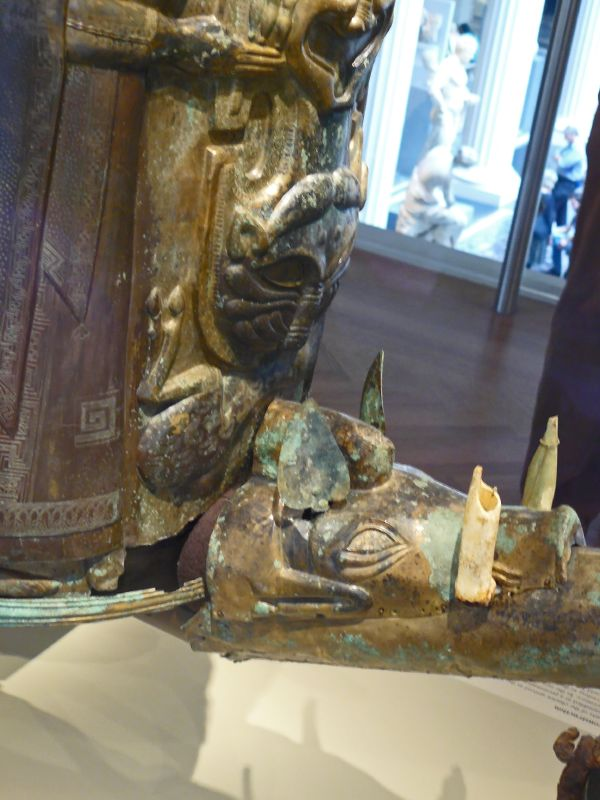
Side view of same

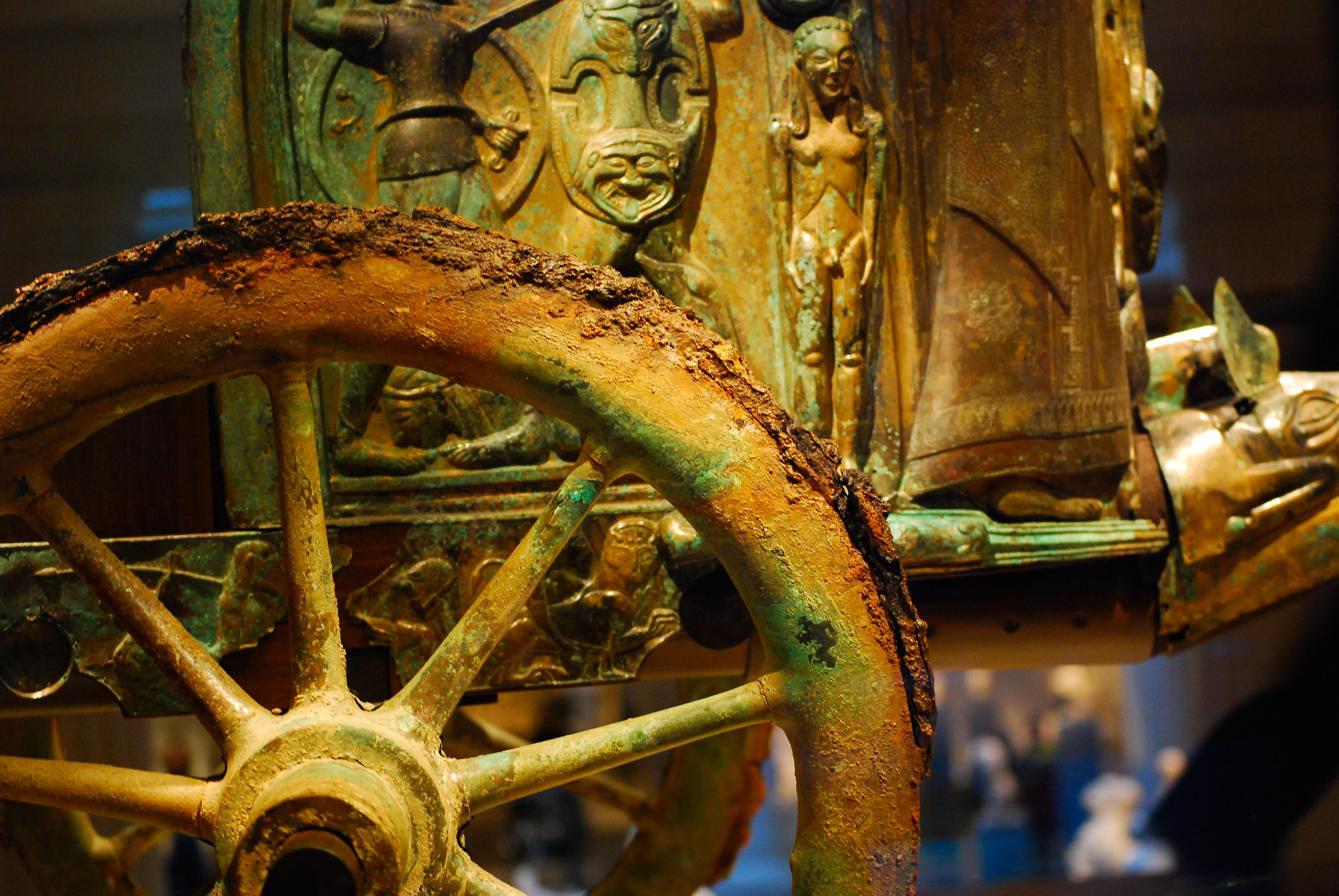
Combat scene, small scenes below, and nude male

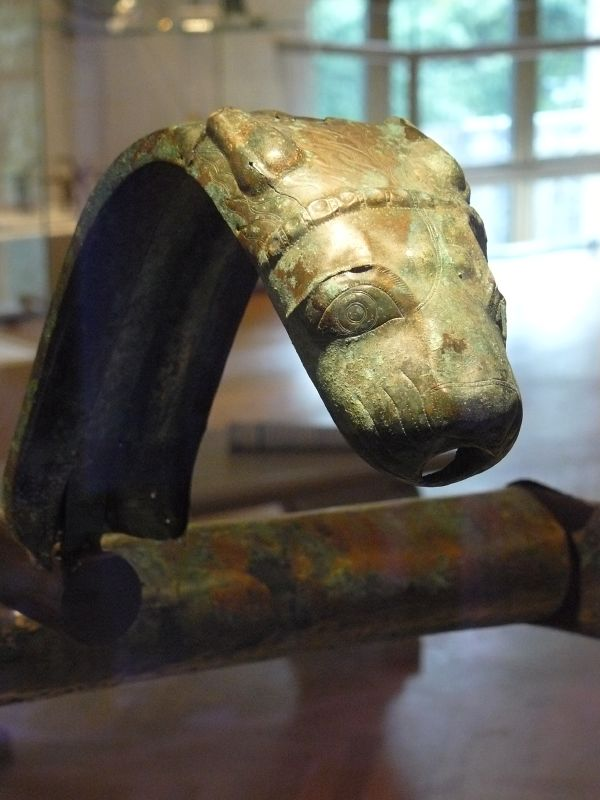
Tip of a shaft side piece

== History ==
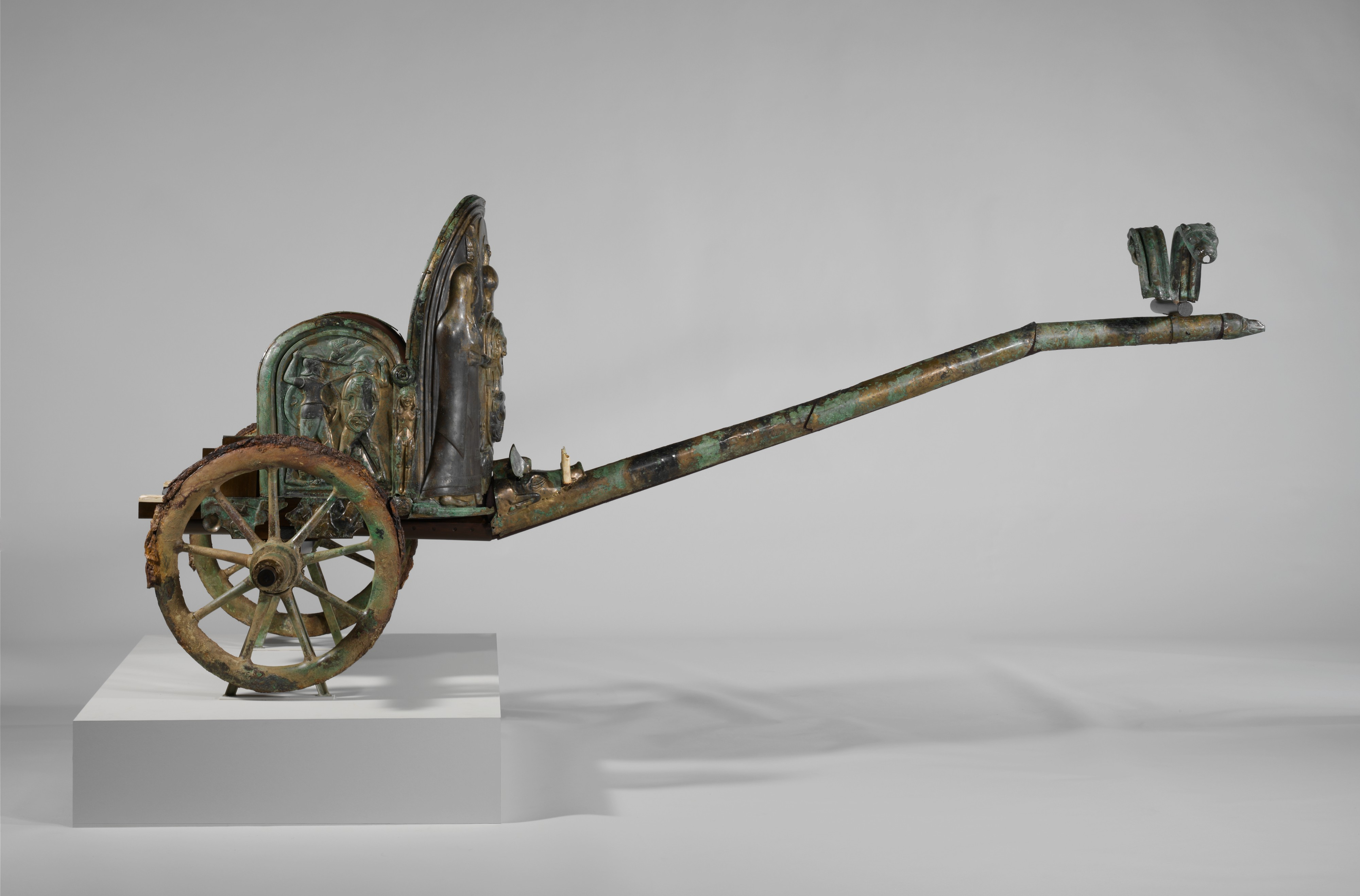
The Monteleone chariot

It was found in 1902 in Monteleone di Spoleto, near Spoleto in the region of Umbria, by a farmer named Isidoro Vannozzi who inadvertently unearthed it while digging a wine cellar or basement barn. Its history from that time is the subject of controversy. The only surviving substantiated account, related by Vannozzi's son Giuseppe, holds that the chariot was immediately sold as scrap metal, and the proceeds from the sale used to buy roof tiles. Changing hands several times after its initial sale, the chariot was eventually purchased in Paris by J. P. Morgan, who sent it to the Metropolitan Museum in 1903, where its first restoration took place.

A full-size copy was made in the mid-20th century, which is on display in Monteleone.

== Restitution controversy ==
The ownership of the chariot has long been contested. As early as February 1904, the loss of the chariot was raised in the Italian Chamber of Deputies in an interrogation by Felice Barnabei. Barnabei referred to the chariot as having been illegally exported, and pressed for measures to prevent similar losses. He further criticized the export-control system as unable to respond quickly at discovery sites, arguing that failures in oversight enabled the removal and resale of antiquities.

In January 2005, the municipality of Monteleone began a campaign aimed at recovering the chariot from the Met; their efforts did not initially receive the backing of the Italian government. The Metropolitan Museum has responded that the chariot was "purchased in good faith".

The issue was reopened after the discovery in 2018 of sixteen letters by the historian Guglielmo Berattino in the Civic Library of Ivrea. The correspondence shows that there were specific arrangements between Metropolitan director Luigi Palma di Cesnola and Count Toesca di Rivarolo, who helped get the chariot out of Italy. Berattino stated that the letters demonstrate that the people involved were fully aware of what they were doing and that the role previously attributed to J. P. Morgan in the acquisition was mistaken. The letters also show that those involved knew the chariot had been taken out of Italy in violation of export laws already in force at the time.

The letters also frame the Rogers donation as a workaround intended to protect the museum from legal liability. This was a multimillion-dollar bequest left to the Metropolitan Museum in 1901 by the railroad magnate Jacob S. Rogers, which financed major purchases of high-profile artworks, including the Monteleone chariot.

In April 2019 the Committee for the Recovery of Works Stolen from Italy began a legal review of the circumstances under which the chariot was transferred abroad, and prepared further analysis before any decision on seeking restitution.

In July 2025 the Italian Ministry of Culture formally supported a diplomatic request for the chariot’s return. The move followed recent research highlighting letters indicating that the Metropolitan Museum leadership knew the chariot had been taken out of the country illegally.
