= Ruscio, Umbria =

Ruscio
- Frazione
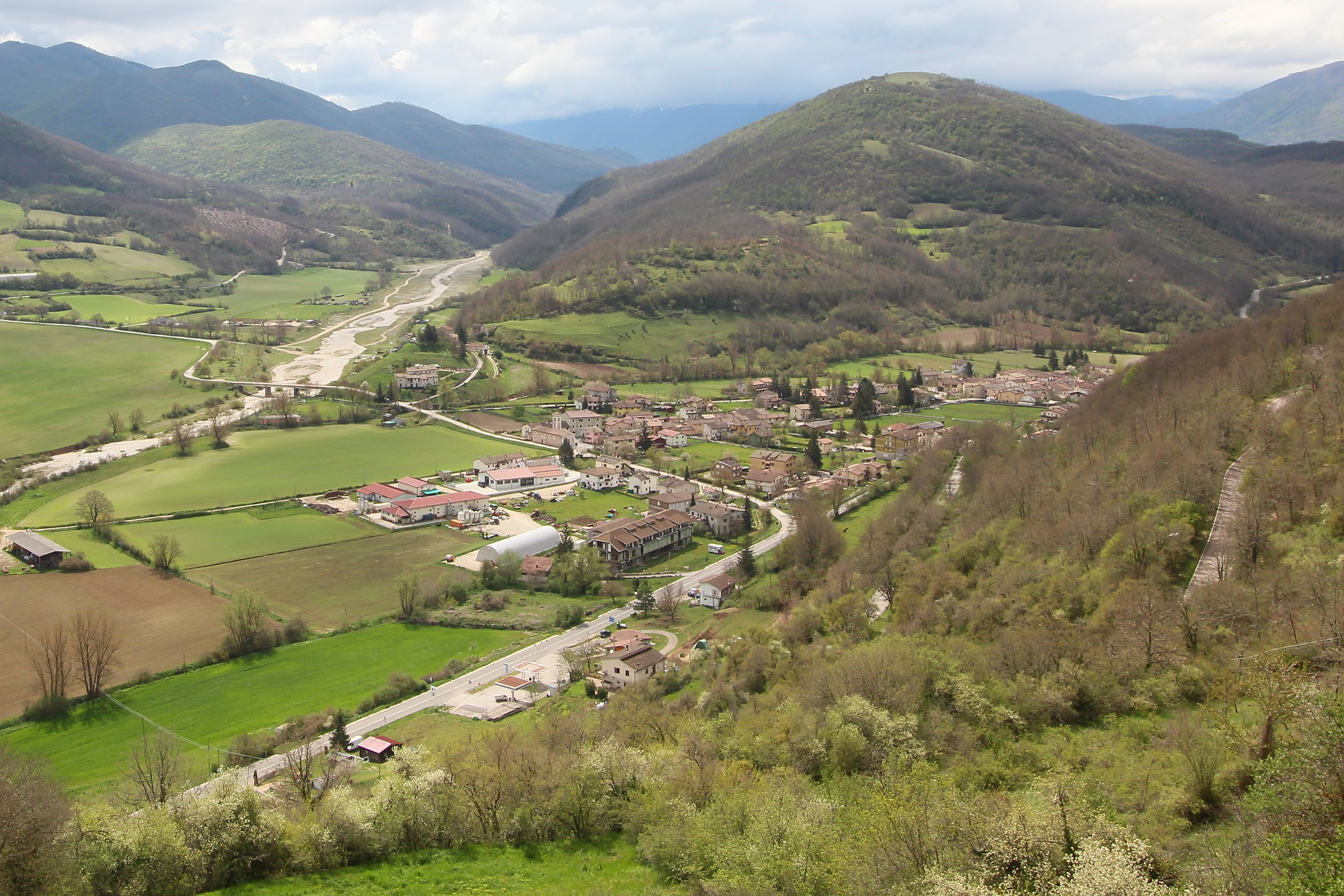
- View of Ruscio

- Location of Ruscio in Italy
- Coordinates: 42°39′N 12°57′E
- Country: Italy
- Region: Umbria
- Province: Perugia
- Comune: Monteleone di Spoleto
- Elevation: 786 m (2,579 ft)

Population (2001)
  - Total: 126
- Time zone: UTC+1 (CET)
  - Summer (DST): UTC+2 (CEST)

Ruscio is a village of east central Umbria, a small Frazione ('Fraction') of Monteleone di Spoleto, located at 42°38N 12°58E in the upper valley of the Corno River at about 900 metres (2953 ft) above sea-level. It is 2 km SE of Monteleone and 11 km (7 mi) N of Leonessa. Its population is estimated at 200.

Monteleone di Spoleto is the village where a celebrated Etruscan chariot was found, now in the Metropolitan Museum of Art in New York. The village and its immediate vicinity also have several Romanesque churches, some Roman remains, and the Bronze Age site, apparently a religious sanctuary, of Forma Cavaliera.

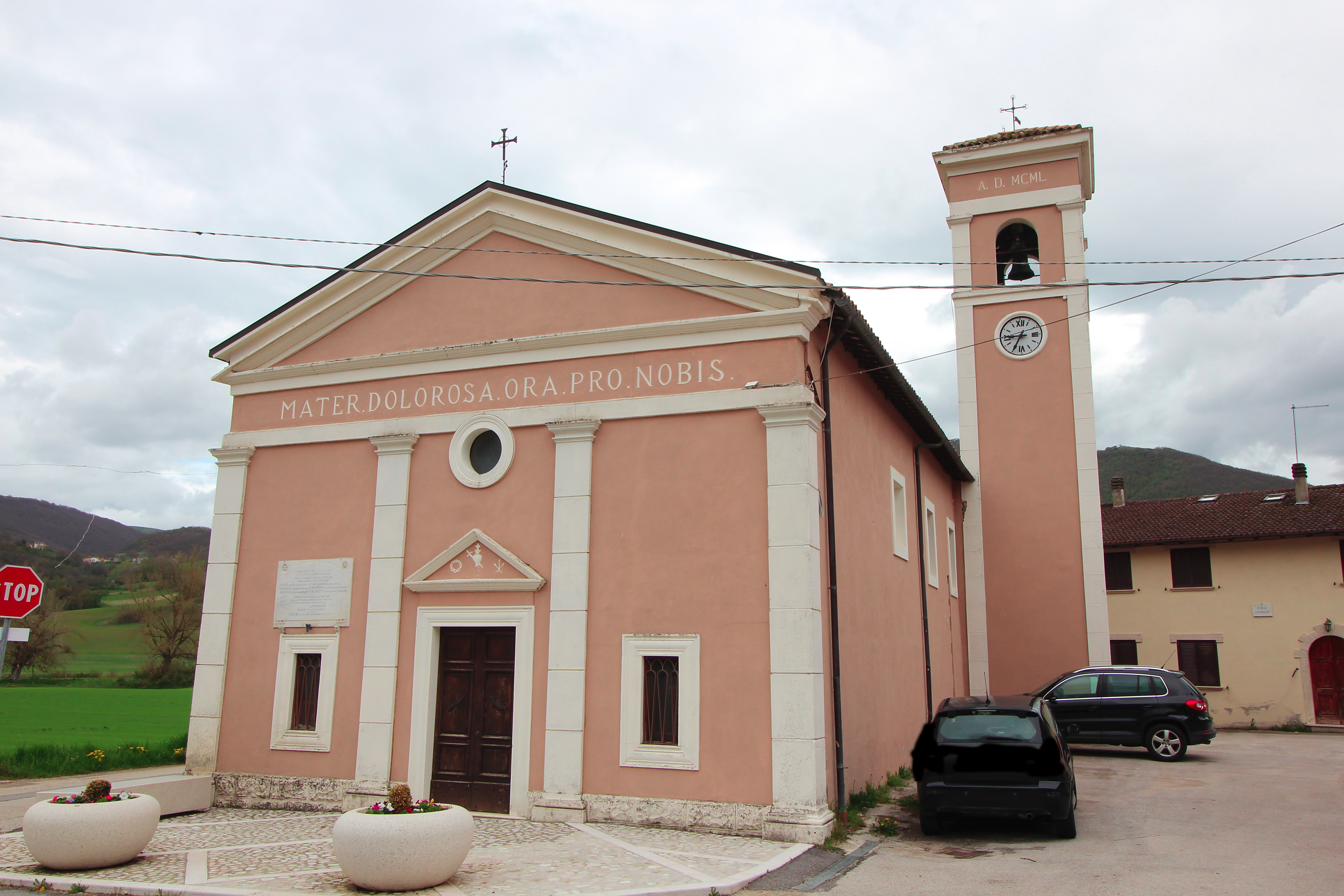
Madonna Addolorata

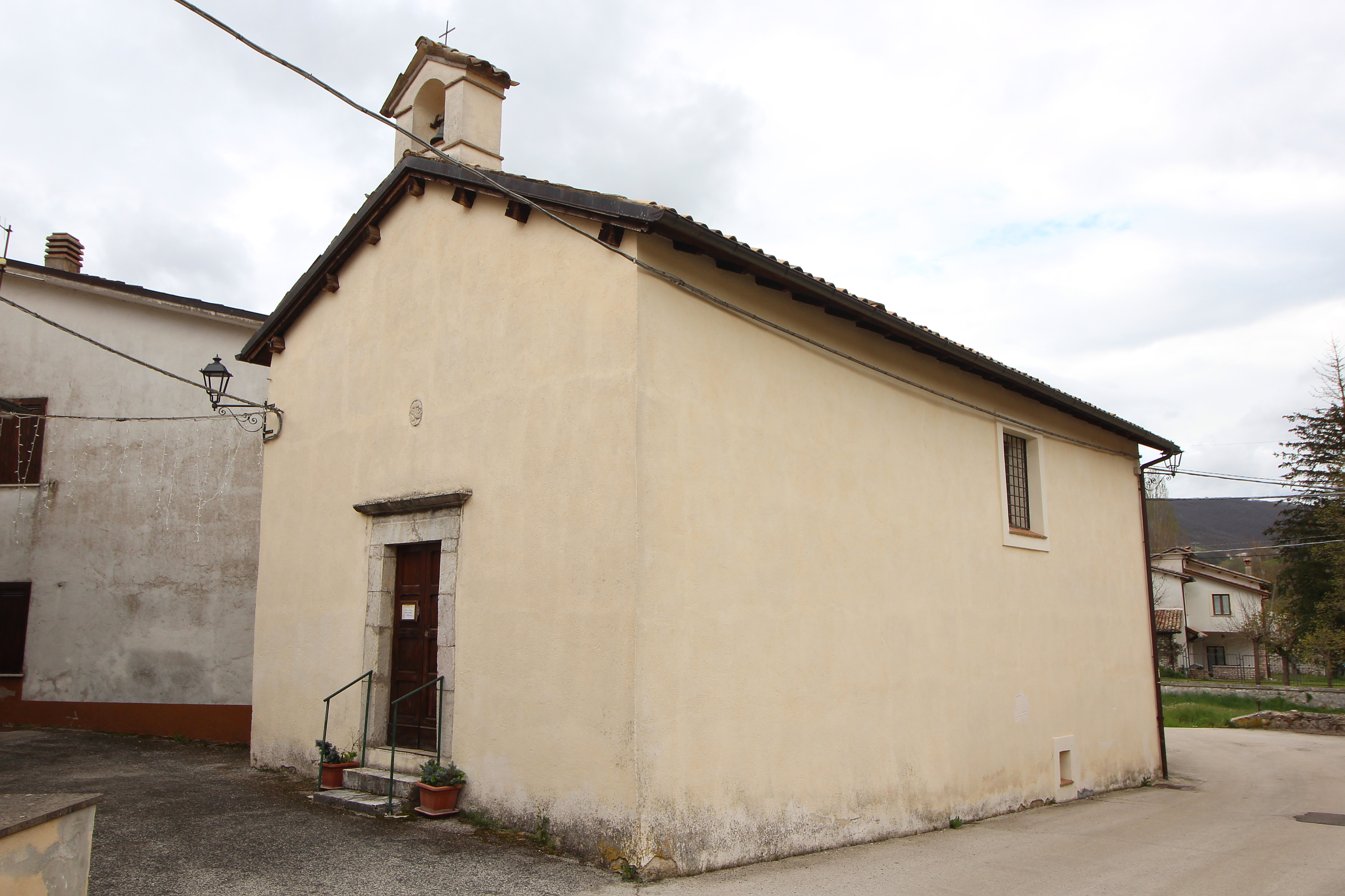
Sant'Antonio da Padova

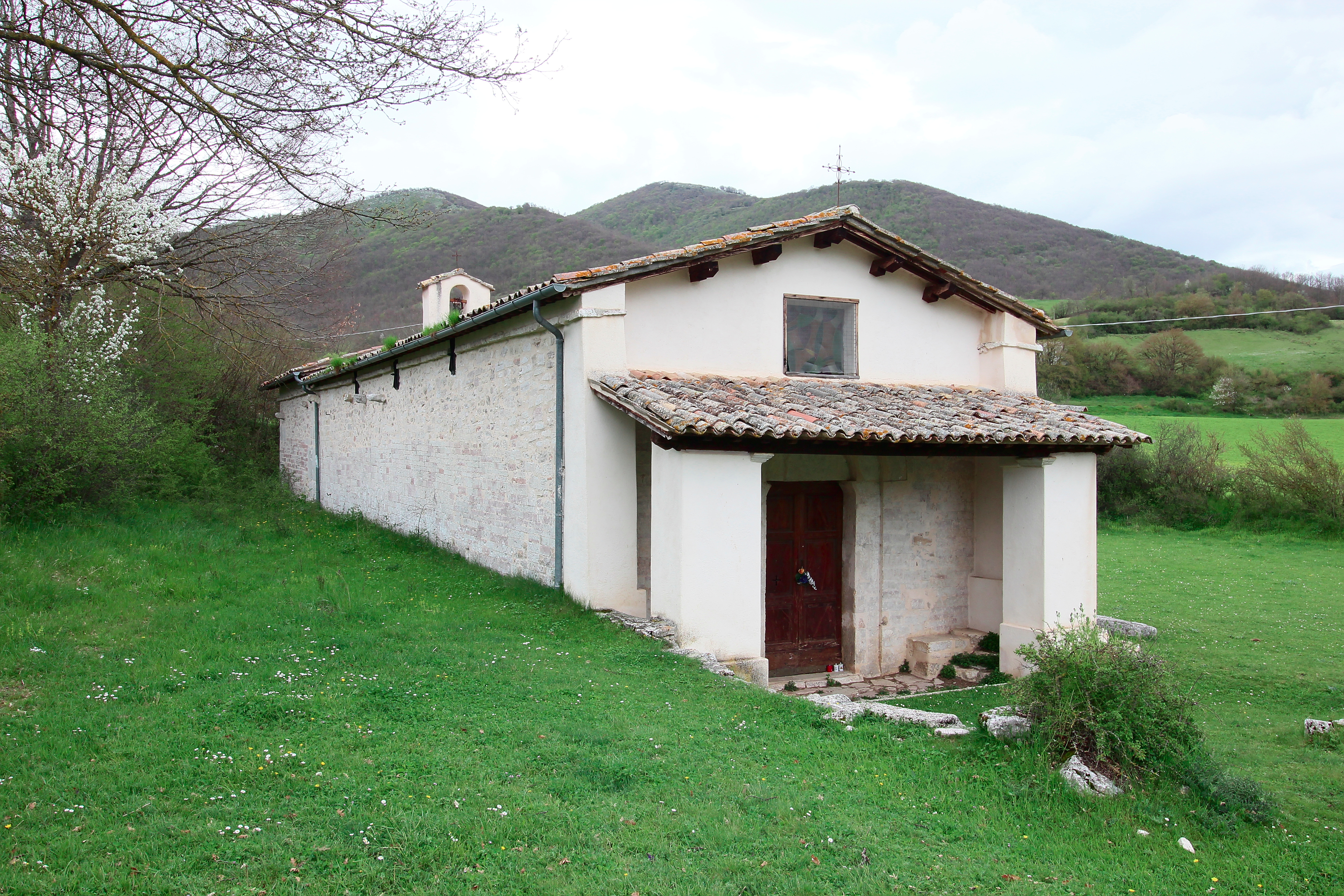
Santa Maria de Equo

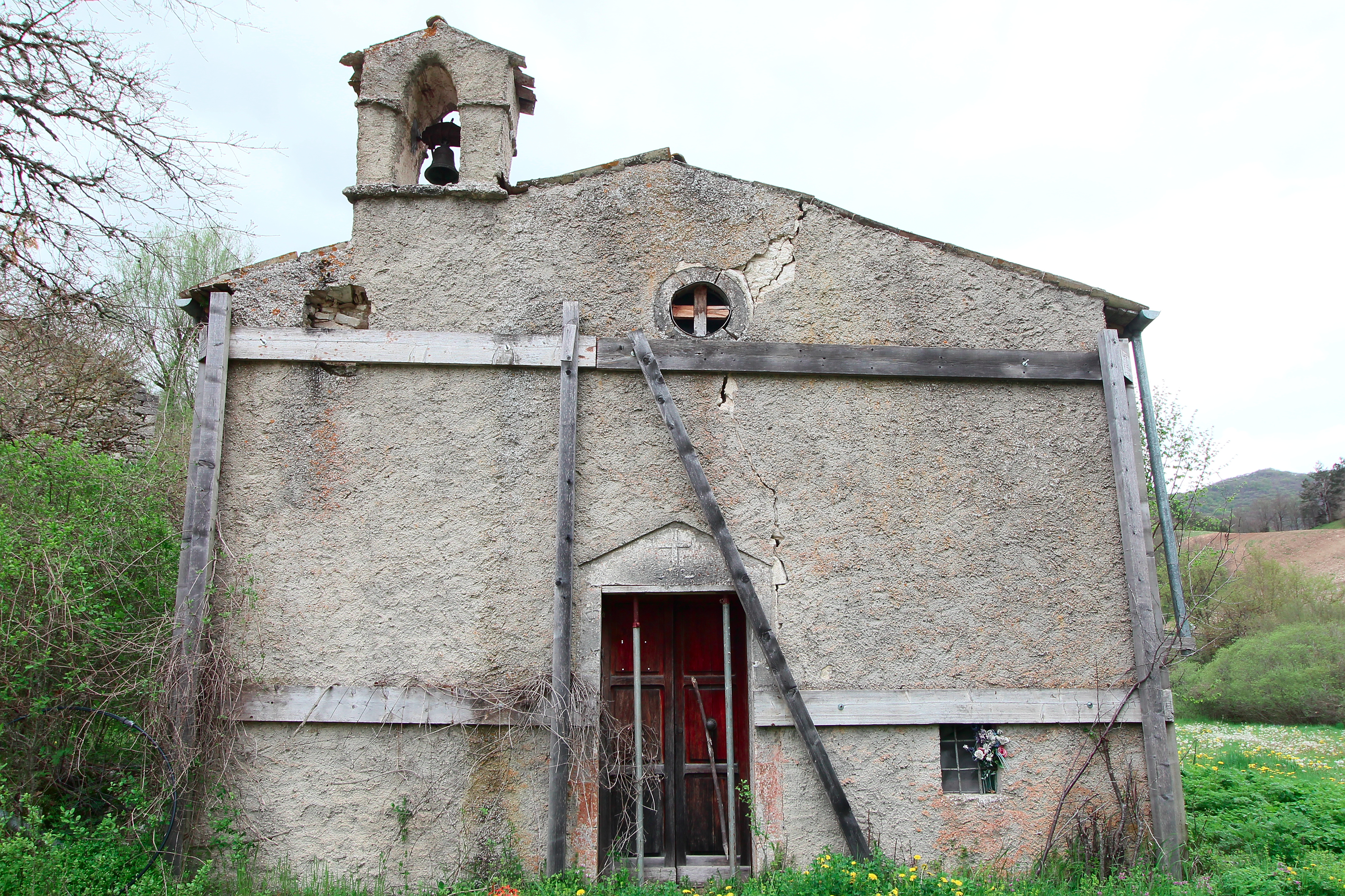
Santa Lucia

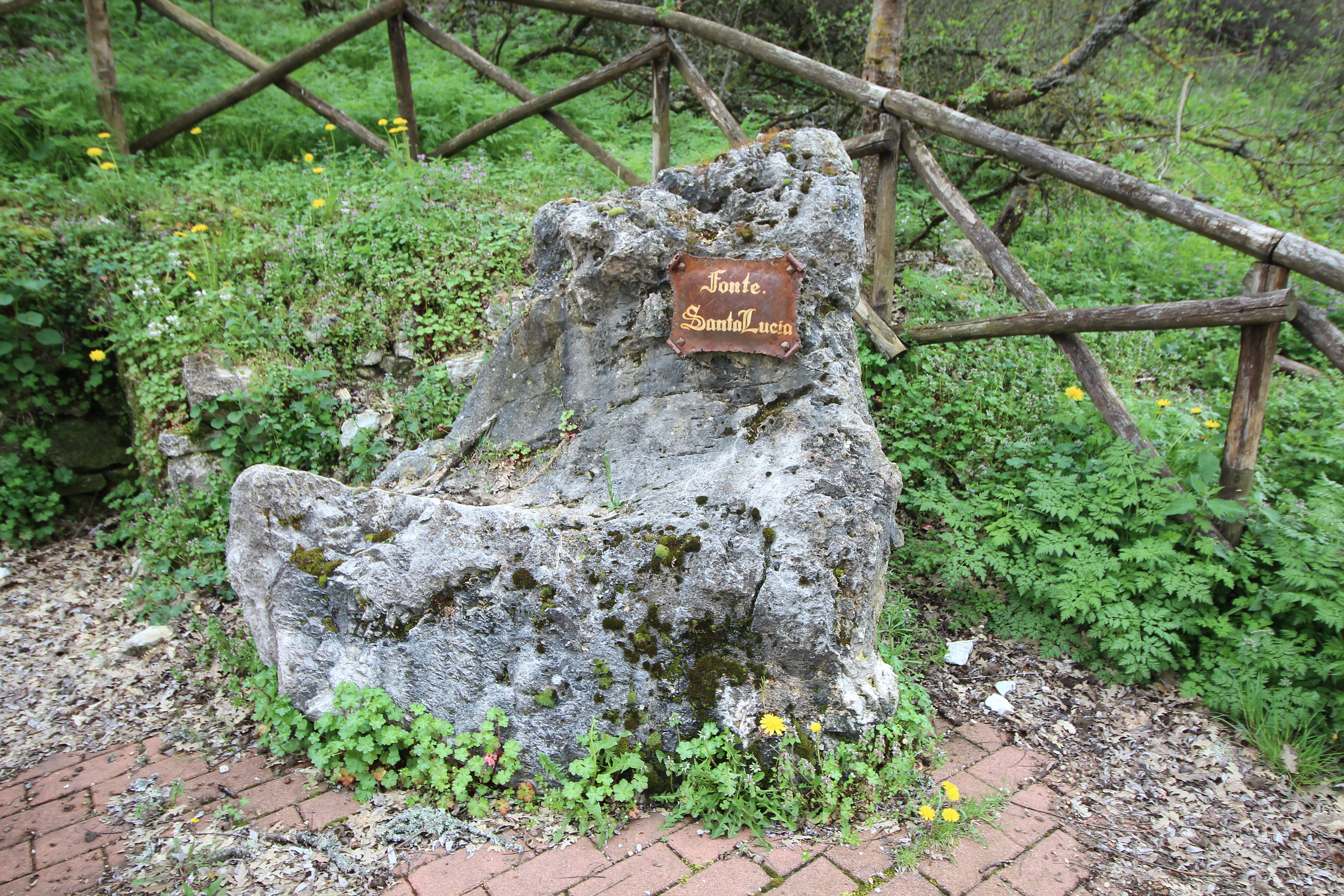
Fonte Santa Lucia

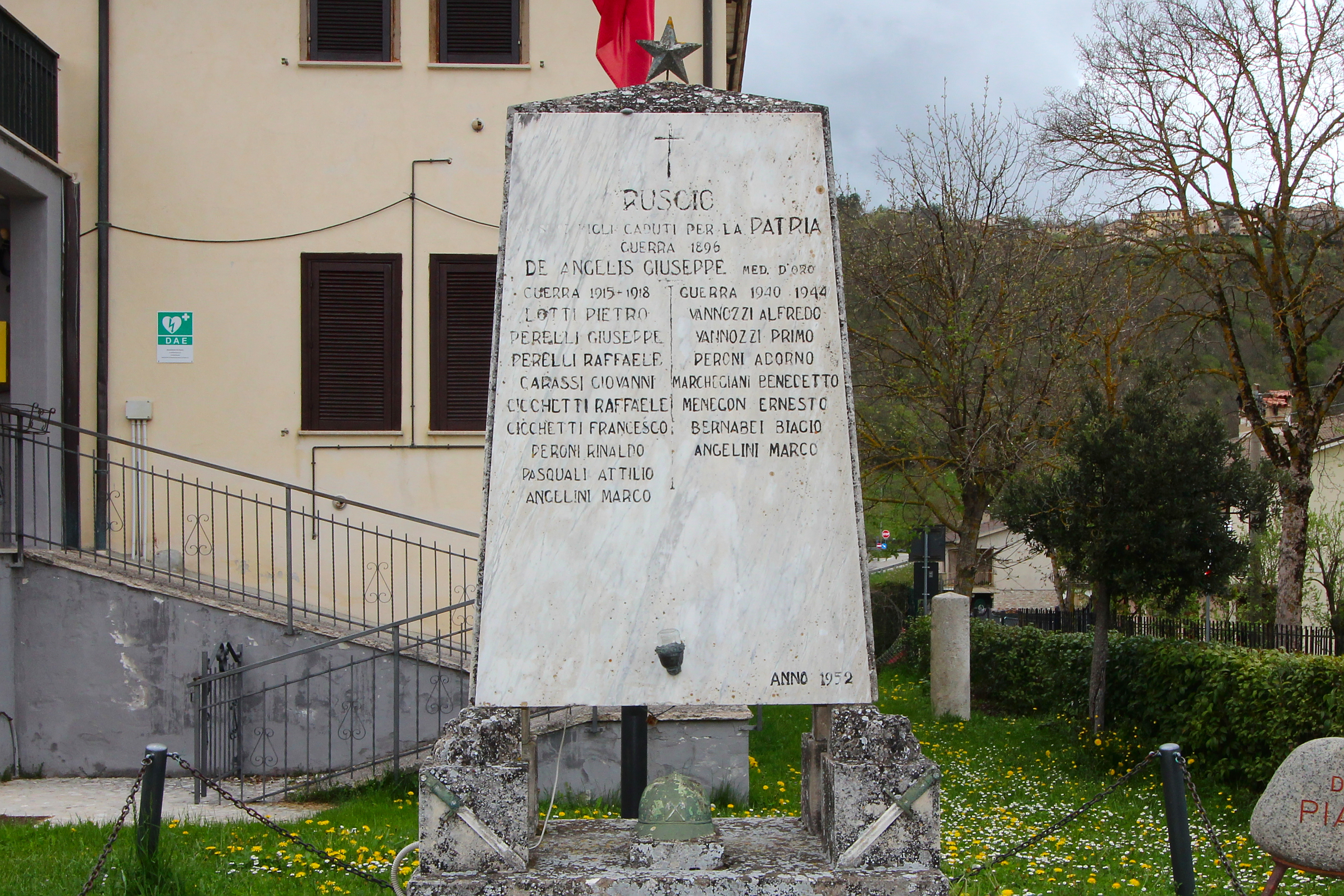
Monumento ai Caduti di Ruscio
