= Nera (Tiber) =

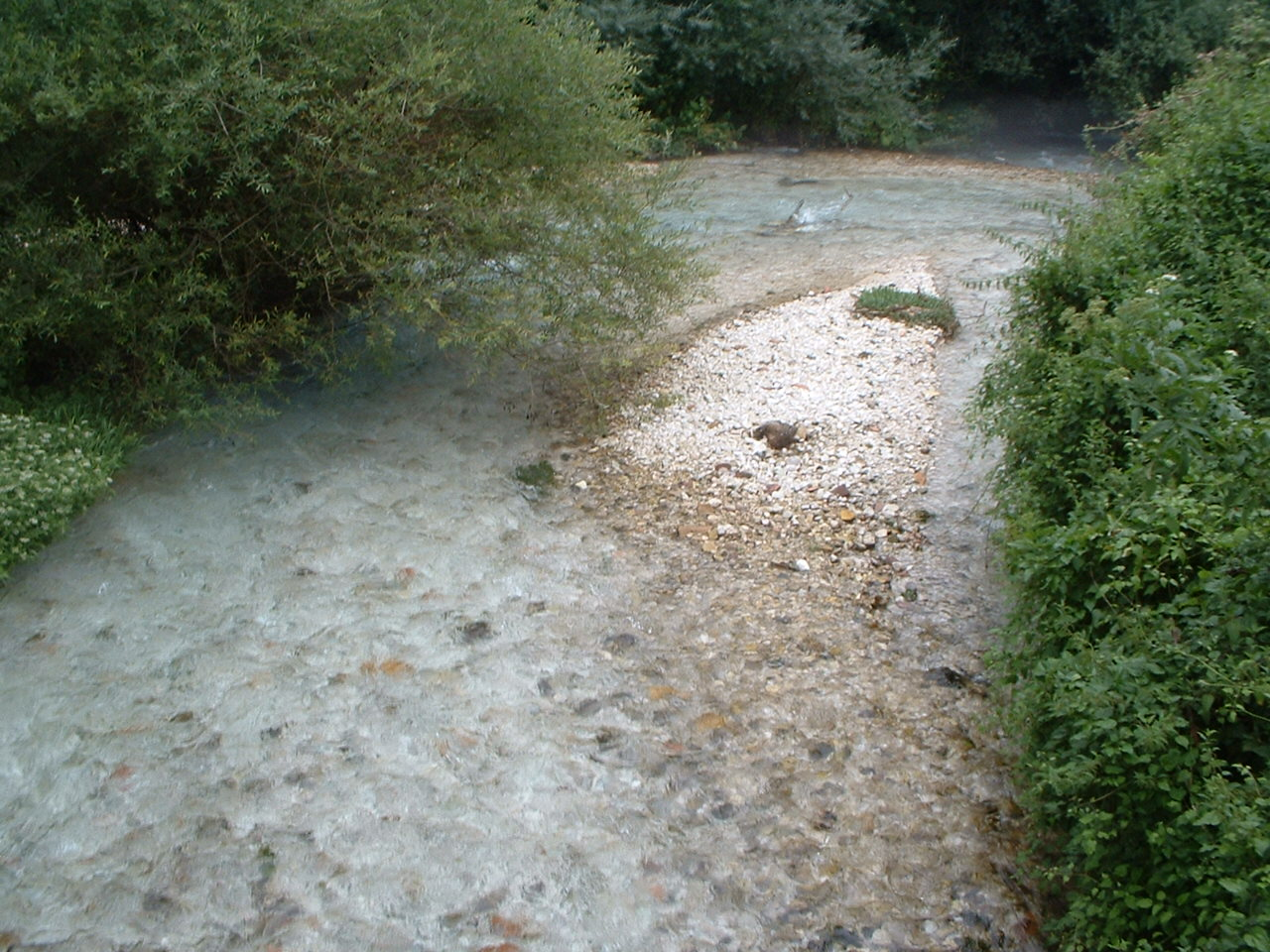
- The view of Nera in Castelsantangelo sul Nera

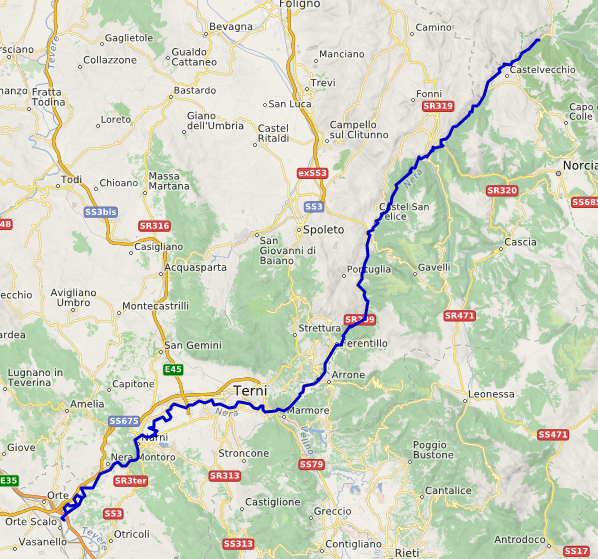

Location
- Country: Italy

Physical characteristics
- Source
  - location: Vallinfante
  - elevation: 1,800 m (5,900 ft)
- Mouth: Tiber
  - location: near Orte
  - coordinates: 42.4428°N 12.4125°E
- Length: 116 km (72 mi)
- Basin size: 4,280 km^{2} (1,650 sq mi)
- Discharge
  - average: 168 m^{3}/s (5,900 cu ft/s)

Basin features
- Progression: Tiber→ Tyrrhenian Sea
- Tributaries
  - left: Corno, Velino

The Nera is a 116-kilometre (72 mi) long river that flows almost entirely in Umbria, Italy. It is the largest tributary of the Tiber. Its sources are in the Monti Sibillini, east of Foligno. It flows southward past Terni and Narni. It joins the Tiber near Orte. Its largest tributaries are the Velino and the Corno.

== See also ==
- Roman shipyard of Stifone (Narni)
