= Sala dei Cento Giorni =

Room in the Palazzo della Cancelleria, Rome

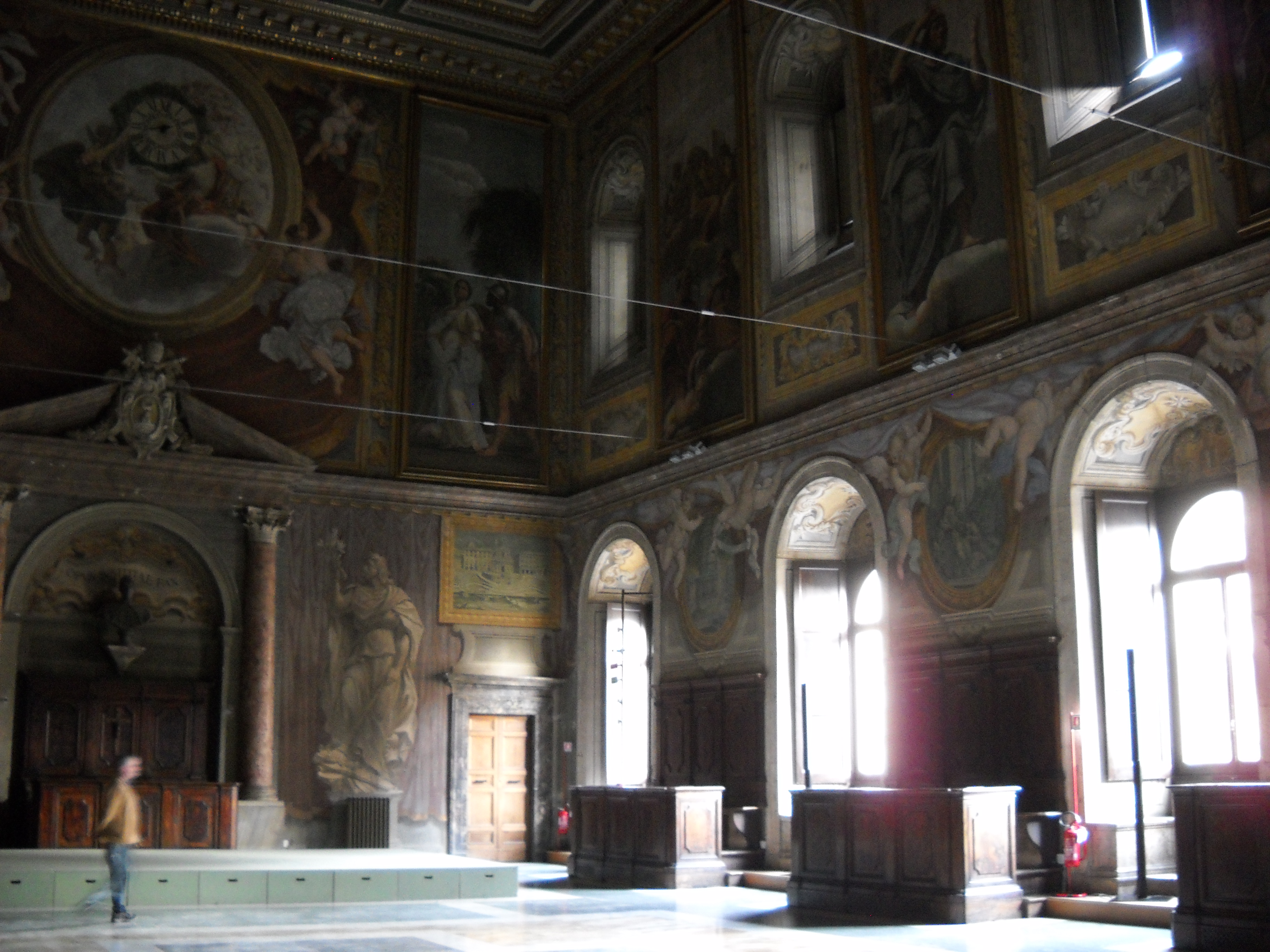
Sala dei Cento Giorni

The Sala dei Cento Giorni ("Room of 100 Days") is the largest reception room, the Salone d'Onore on the piano nobile, of the Palazzo della Cancelleria or Chancellery in Central Rome, Italy. The frescoes by Giorgio Vasari and his studio in 1547, epitomize the Mannerist style. Supposedly they were completed in a hundred days.

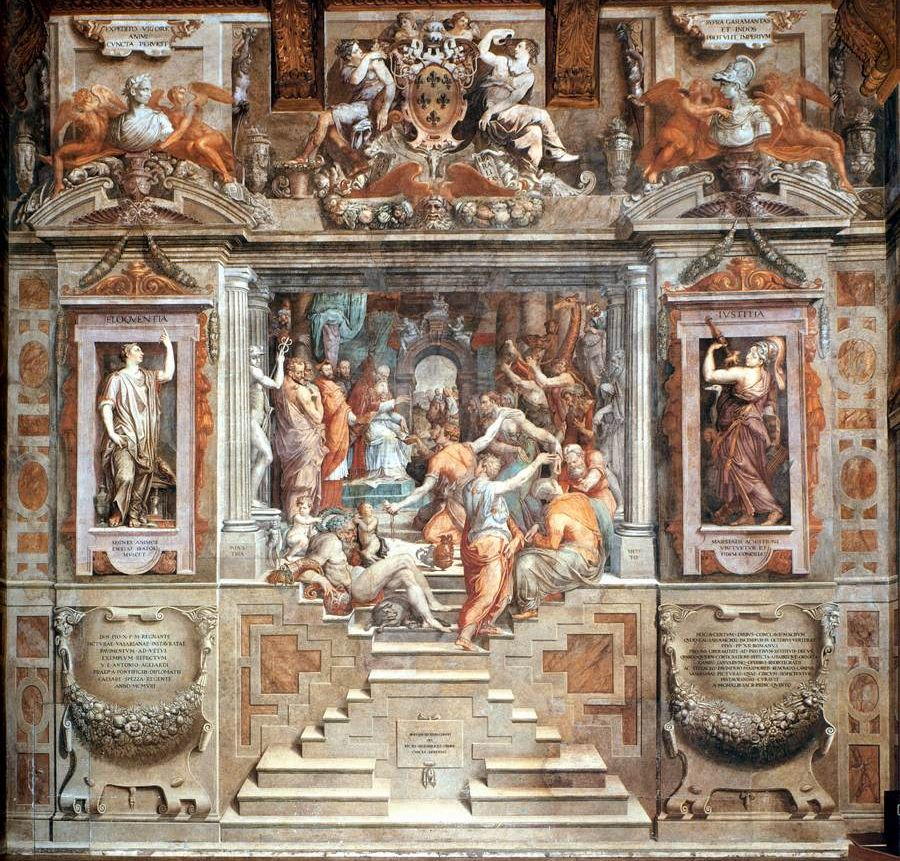
Tribute of the Nations to Paul III

In March 1546, Cardinal Alessandro Farnese (1520–1589), at the suggestion of Paolo Giovio, commissions Vasari to paint a fresco a hall of the chancery in the Palazzo of San Giorgio, which was remodeled and rebuilt as the massive Palazzo della Cancelleria. The purpose of the frescoes was to celebrate the life of Pope Paul III, Alessandro's grandfather. In his biography of Artists (Vite), Vasari details the planning, commission and execution of this work.

Legend has it that Michelangelo, known for his plodding meticulous style, was shown the work and Vasari bragged about the rapid execution, Michelangelo is reputed to have tartly replied: si vede! ("it shows!"). The work even in its day was not admired for its quality. Paolo Giovio reports to Cardinal Farnese that the portraits displeased him. Today, the condition of the frescoes is mediocre, even though they were restored several times after a 1940 fire.

== Program ==
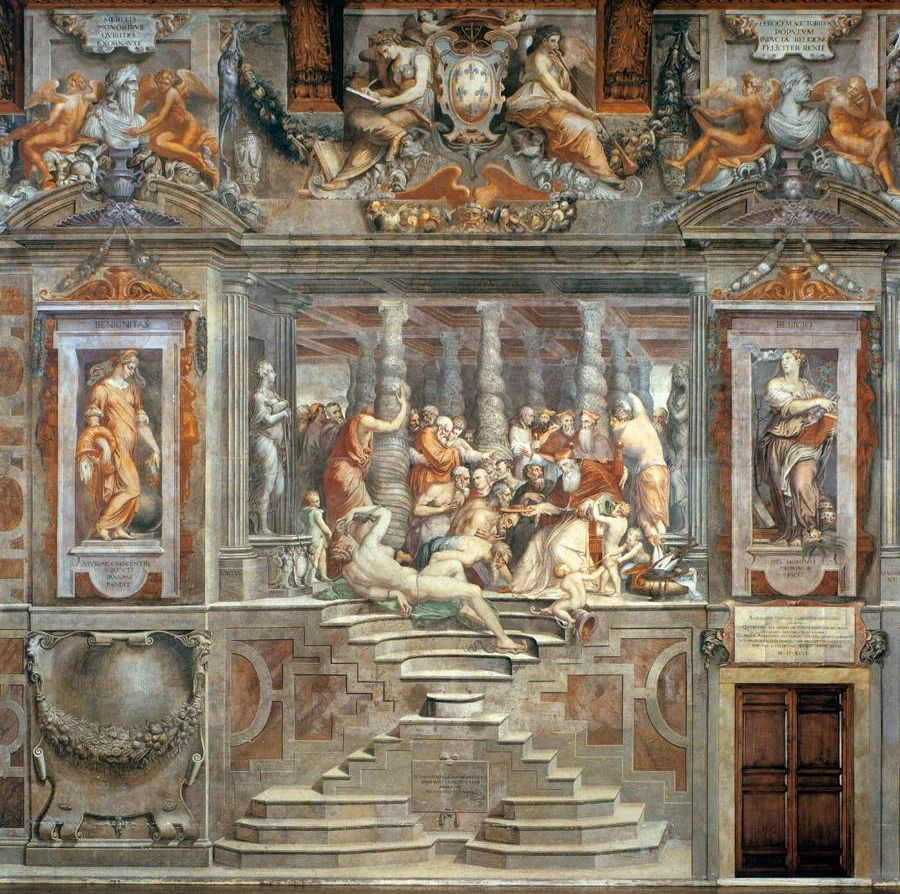
Pope Paul III (Farnese) Names Cardinals and Distributes Benefices

In the Sala dei Cento Giorni, Vasari and his assistants work in an elaborate and fanciful manner. The narrative unfolds within an unusual illusionist space flooded with allegoric ornamentation and further by numerous figures in painted architecture surrounded by simulated sculpture. The gestures and expressions of the figures are extravagant and exaggerated in a courtly manner, according to the Maniera style of the mid-Cinquecento.

The decoration in this room exemplifies the third type of wall decoration: it is stylistically related to the Chamber of Fortune in the Casa Vasari. This hall is rectangular. Its flat wooden ceiling is composed of recessed coffered shapes. These squares are created by the intersection of wooden beams. A corbel resting on the upper part of the wall supports the end of each beam. The east wall contains six large windows on the lower zone and six small ones in the upper zone. The north and south walls each contain only one bay, while the west wall contains two. The treatment of the wall decoration is geometric and architectonic. The wall is not considered as a painted two-dimensional surface, but rather as a plastic, architectural structure in which imaginary and real space can expand and contract as one.

The wall, which treated in a frieze-like style, is divided into two horizontal zones, each in turn divided into three vertical parts. The upper part contains at each end a portrait bust of an ancient emperor framed by winged Ignudi or allegories of Victory. A Latin motto is inscribed in a scroll above this composition. In the center of this upper zone, seated female figures framed by the wooden corbels present an escutcheon. They can he identified by the attributes they hold and by the Latin inscription on the scroll at their feet. Variations of grotesque motifs added to the overall decoration of this zone.

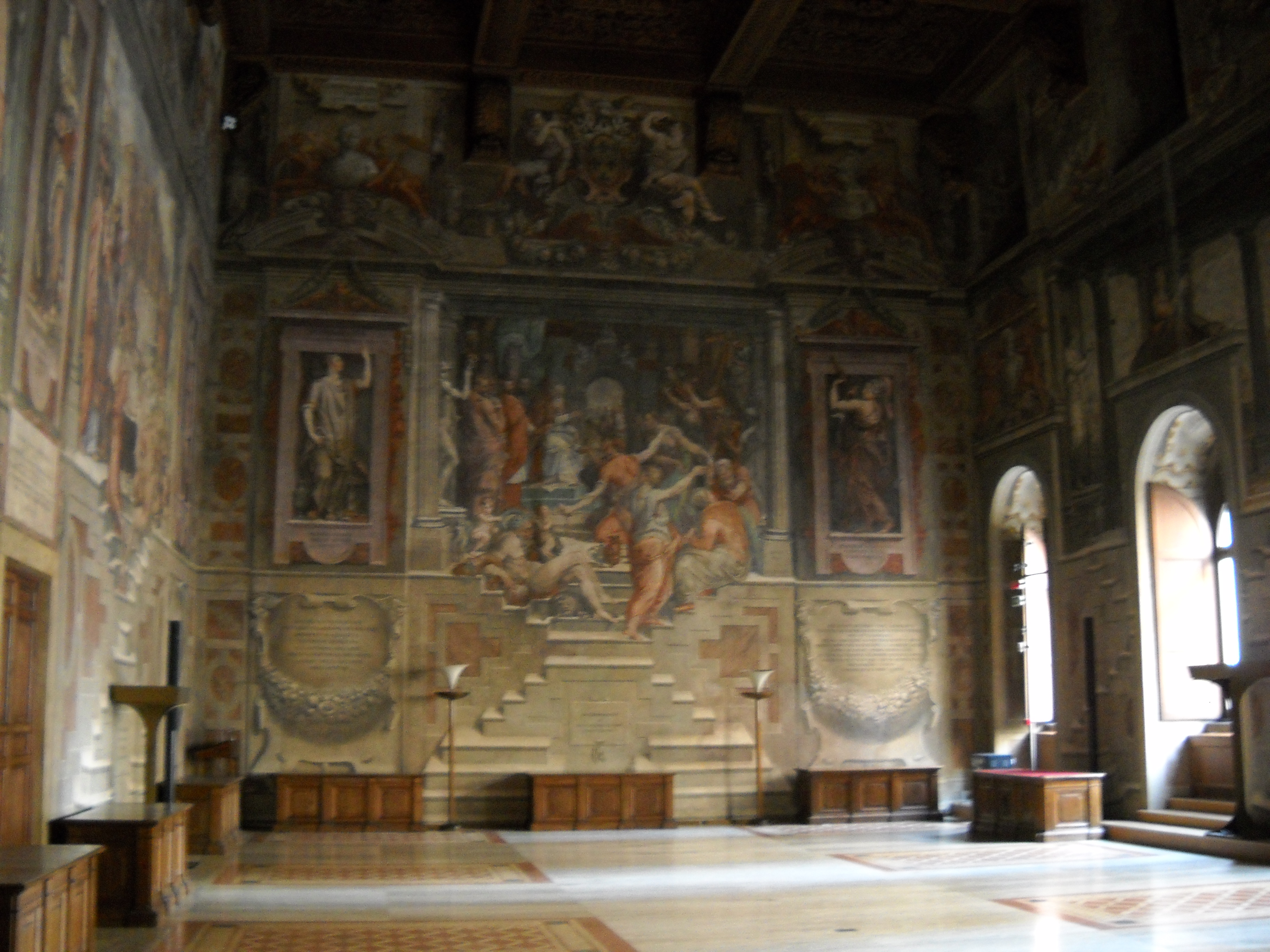
The end with the "Benefices" section

The lower and upper parts are separated by two broken pediments at the ends of the wall (where the ancient busts rest) and by the architrave running between them. This architrave supports an elaborate mask and festoon motifs. In the lower part of the wall are two painted tabernacles supporting the broken pediments described above. The tabernacle motif contains an open area, or niche, from which a standing female figure protrudes toward the viewer: a motif deriving from Vasari's Michelangelesque studies of the Medici Chapel. In the center of the lower part, Doric columns frame depictions of an istoria.

Using painted architecture to frame a narrative scene, commonly in antiquity, was elaborated in the Quattrocento, for example, in the Salone dei Mesi of the Schifanoia Palace at Ferrara, and later in the High Renaissance as exemplified by the Sala di Costantino in the Vatican Palace. The istorie are filled with stylistic quotations from past and present art. The dado (zoccolo or basamento) of the wall has been either transformed or eliminated. Vasari creates a new, large-scale device by using illusionistically painted steps extending from the center of the lower zone to the actual physical floor. It seems as if the viewer could step up into the painted scene and participate in the events occurring in narrative istoria. According to Sydney Freedberg, the steps motif is a transformation of Michelangelo's ricetto (vestibule) in the Biblioteca Laurenziana.

Other important sources for Vasari's motifs are their exedra of Cortile del Belvedere at the Vatican and the Nymphaeum fresco in the window embrasure of the Hall of Constantine, also in the Vatican Palace.

The decorative scheme in the Sala dei Cento Giorni is systematized and framed into quadro riportato, or independent framed scenes of history. The quadri or frames are flanked by tabernacles containing figures that symbolize moral or aesthetic virtues. And the overall design is fused by classical and grotesque motifs. The execution of the Sala dei Cento Giorni is invaluable for Vasari. It is, in fact, the beginning of a formalized, complex painting program that is to undergo further elaboration in the decorative cycles of the Palazzo Vecchio.

== Gallery ==
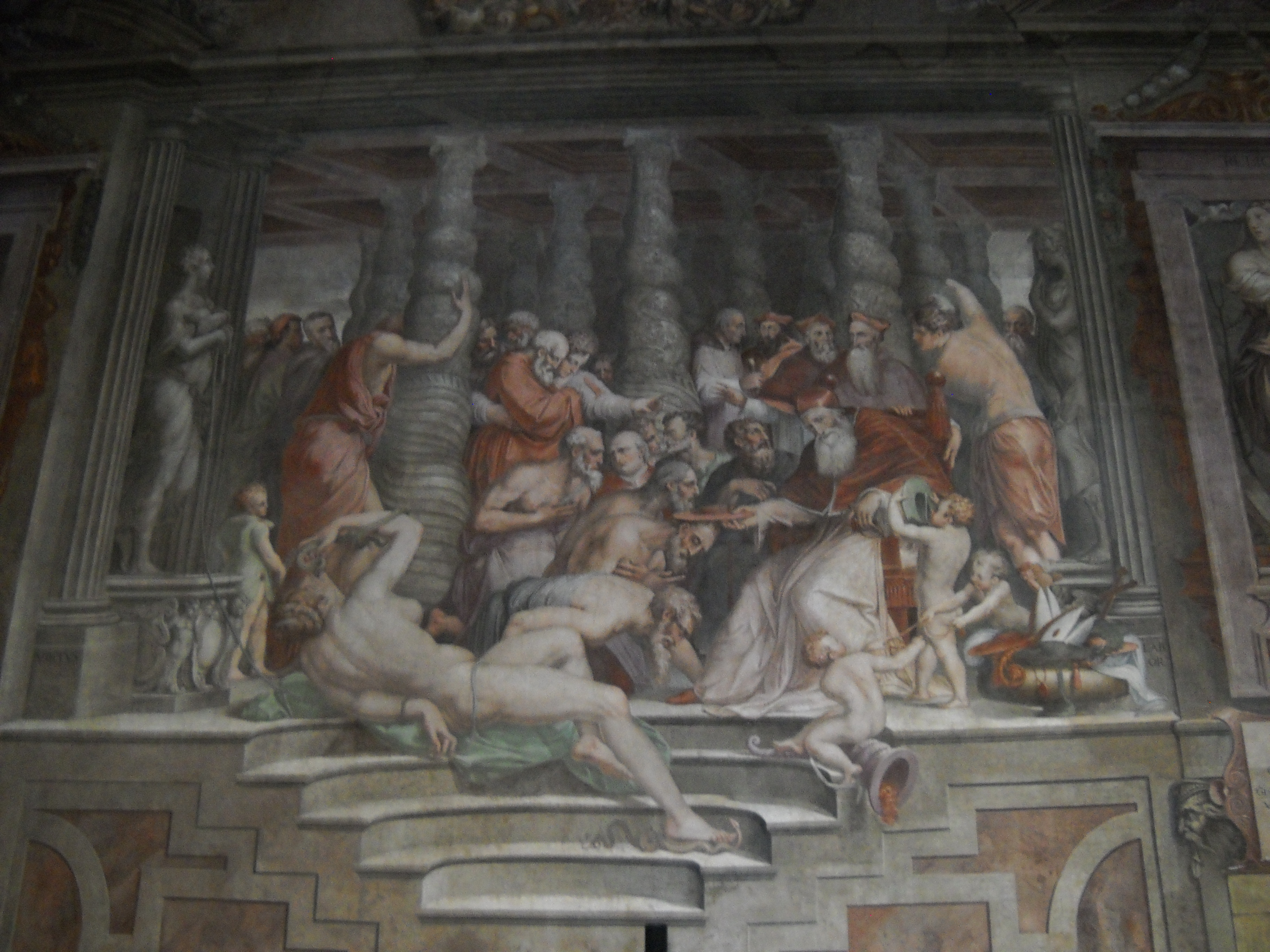
Sala dei Cento Giorni - Giorgio Vasari - 1547 - Palazzo della Cancelleria - istoria

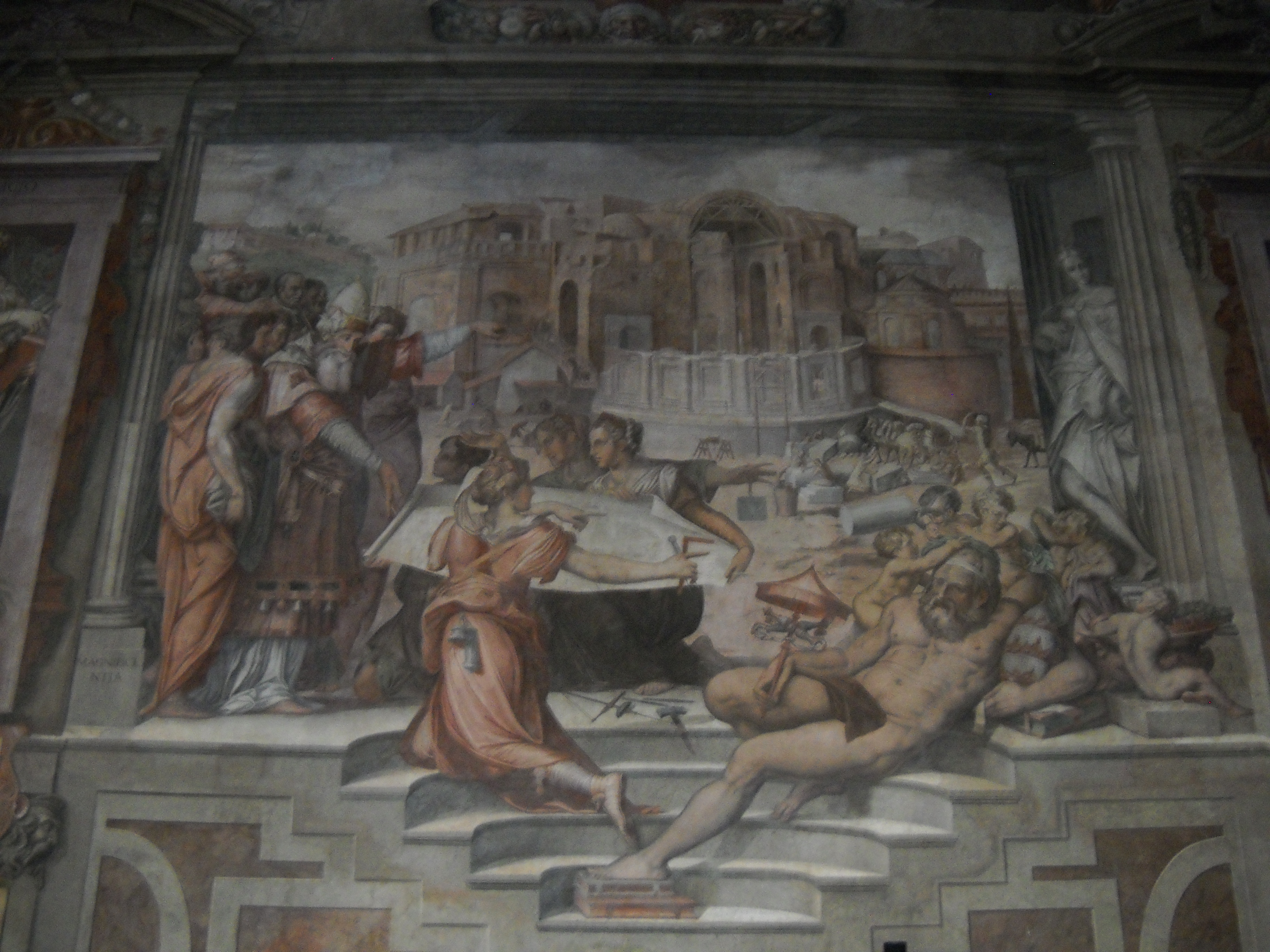
Sala dei Cento Giorni - Giorgio Vasari - 1547 - Palazzo della Cancelleria - istoria

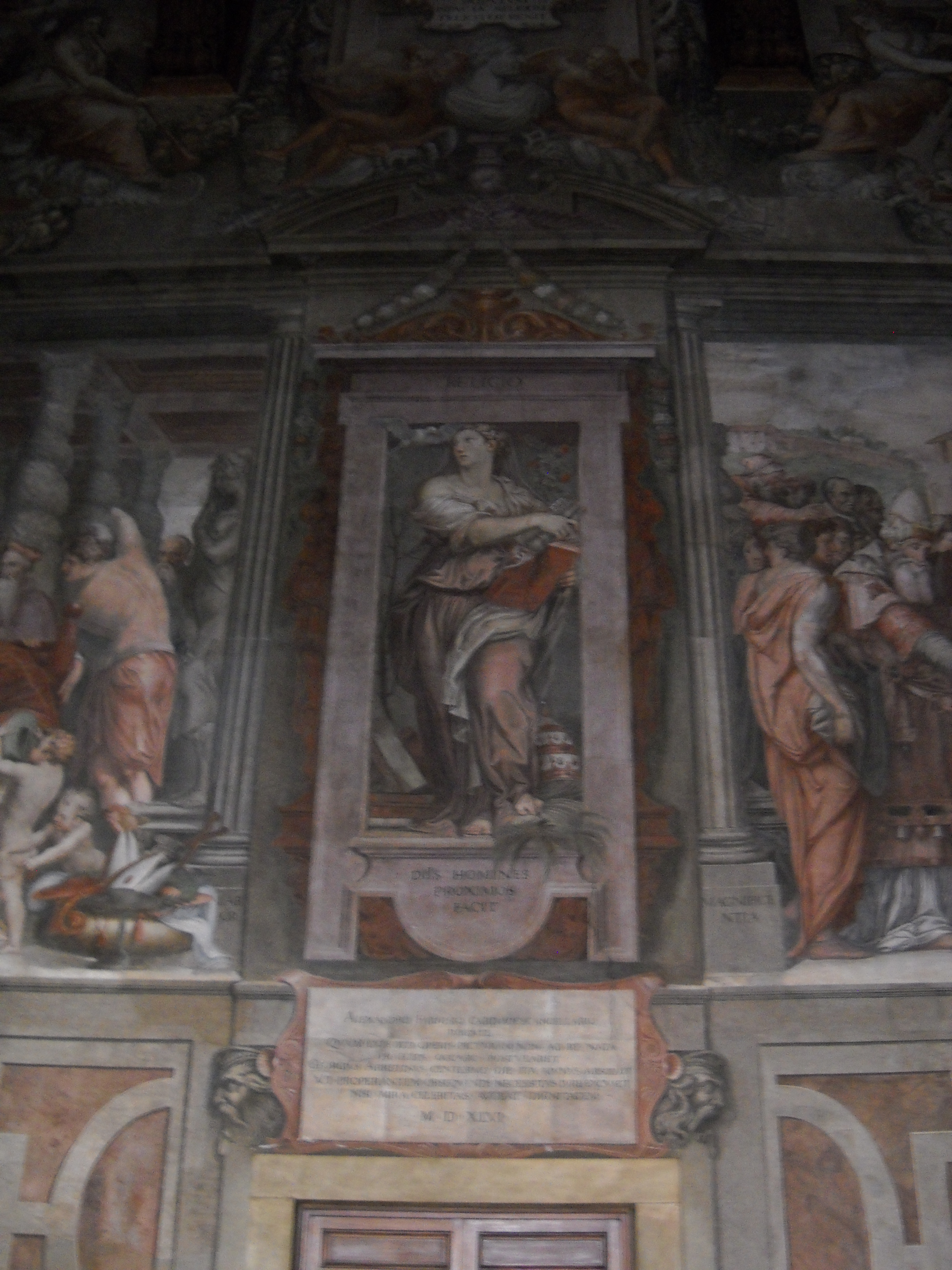
Virtue - Sala dei Cento Giorni - Giorgio Vasari - 1547 - Palazzo della Cancelleria

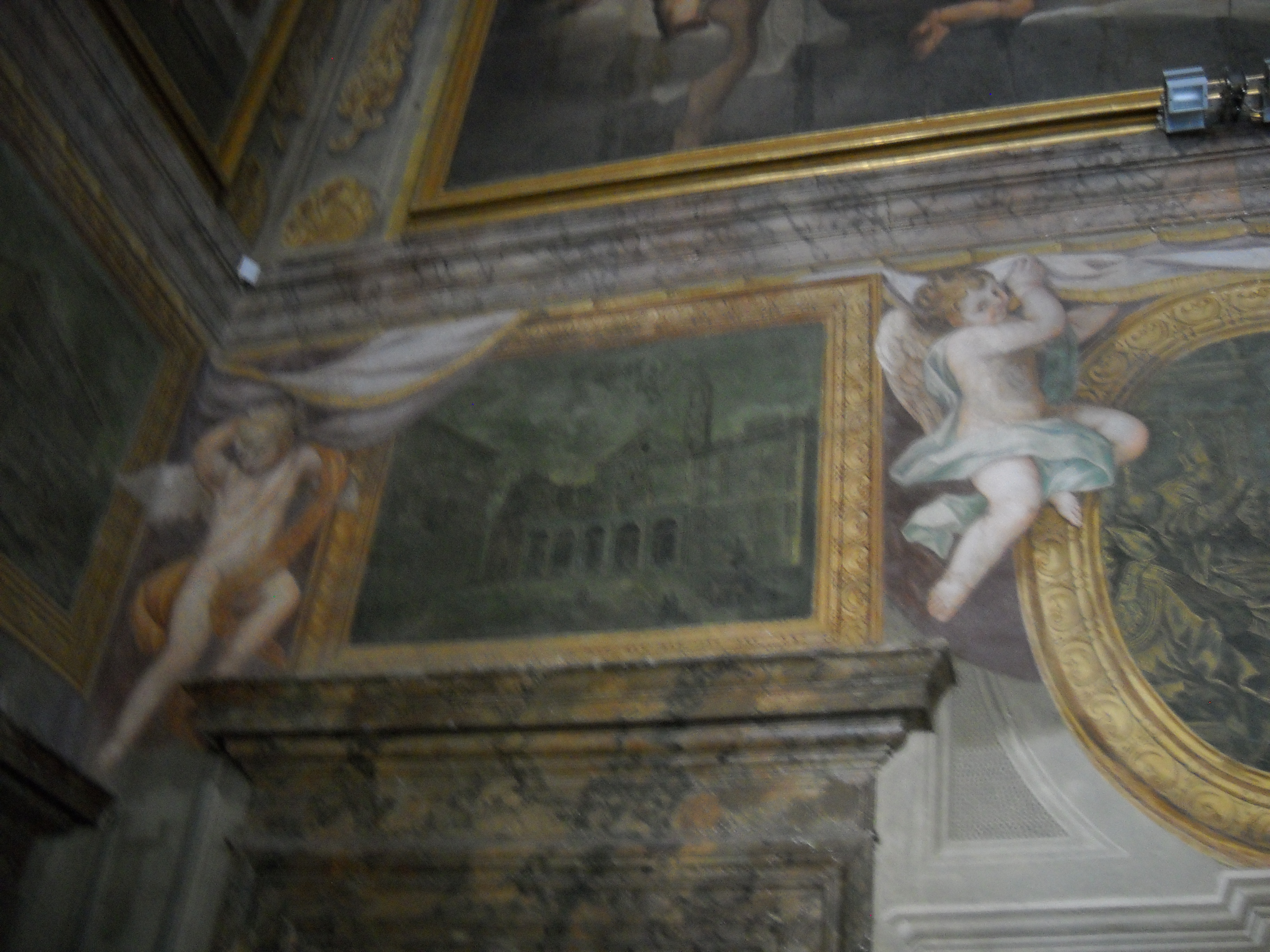
Putti and istoria - Sala dei Cento Giorni - Giorgio Vasari - 1547 - Palazzo della Cancelleria

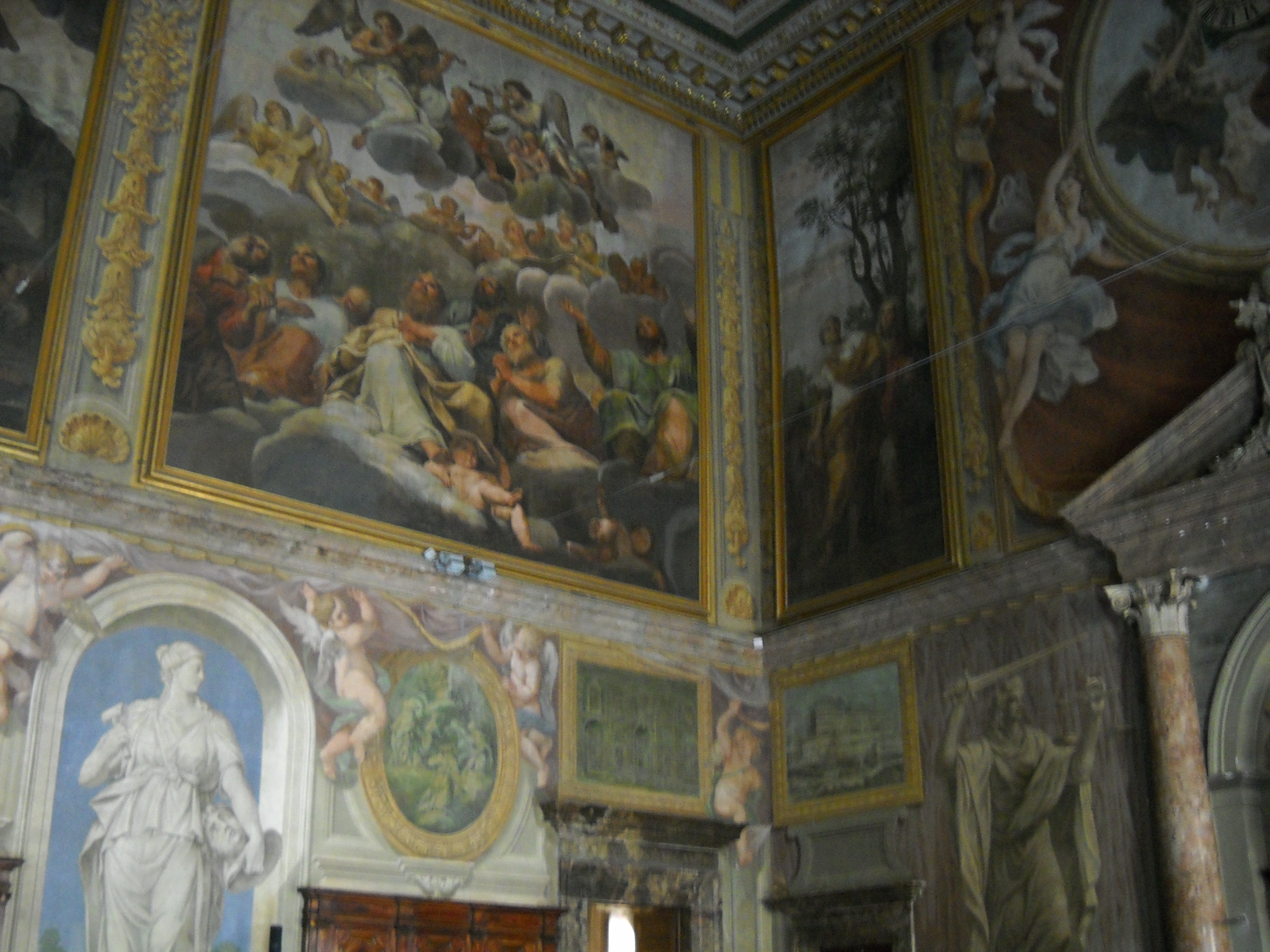
Wall decoration fragment - Sala dei Cento Giorni - Giorgio Vasari - 1547 - Palazzo della Cancelleria

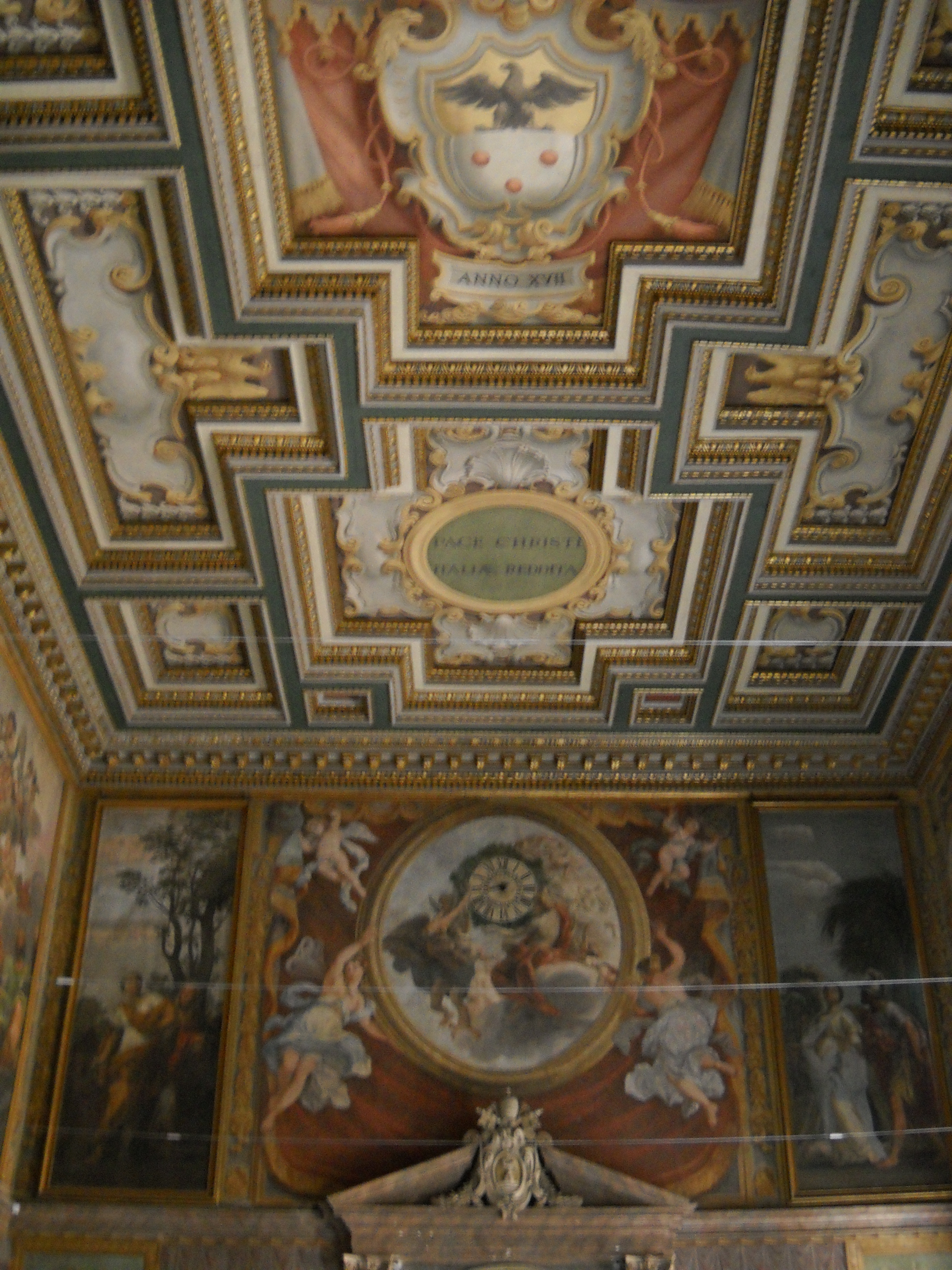
Escutcheon - Sala dei Cento Giorni - Giorgio Vasari - 1547 - Palazzo della Cancelleria
