= Alessandro Fortori =

Italian painter

Alessandro Fortori (16th-century) was an Italian painter of the Mannerist period.

He was born in Arezzo. He was one of the fellow painters from Arezzo, along with Bastiano Flori and Fra Salvatore Foschi, recruited to paint at sundry projects by Giorgio Vasari. Fortori painted For the church of San Francesco (1568) in Citerna and for the church of San Domenico (1569) in Citta di Castello.
