= Giorgio Vasari =

Italian painter, architect, writer, and historian (1511–1574)

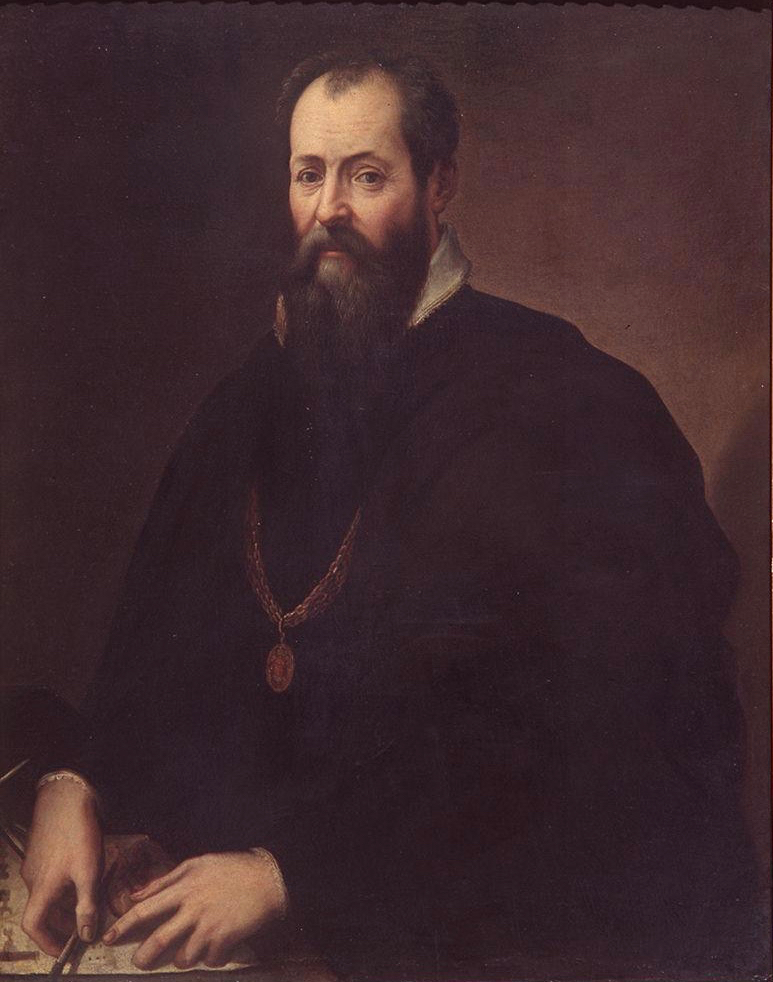
- Portrait by Jacopo Zucchi, c. 1571–1574 (Uffizi Gallery, Florence)
- Born: 30 July 1511; Arezzo, Republic of Florence
- Died: 27 June 1574 (aged 62); Florence, Grand Duchy of Tuscany
- Education: Andrea del Sarto
- Known for: Painting; architecture; art history
- Notable work: The Lives of the Most Excellent Painters, Sculptors, and Architects
- Movement: Mannerism; High Renaissance
- Spouse: Niccolosa Bacci

Giorgio Vasari (Note: /vəˈsɑːri/, US also /-ˈzɑːr-, vɑːˈzɑːri/; Italian: [ˈdʒordʒo vaˈzaːri]) (30 July 1511 – 27 June 1574) was an Italian Renaissance painter, architect, art historian, and biographer known for his work Lives of the Most Excellent Painters, Sculptors, and Architects, considered the ideological foundation of Western art-historical writing, and still much cited in modern biographies of the many Italian Renaissance artists he covers, including Leonardo da Vinci and Michelangelo, although he is since regarded as including many factual errors, especially when covering artists from before he was born.

Vasari was a Mannerist painter highly regarded both as a painter and architect in his day, but rather less so in later centuries. He was effectively what would later be called the minister of culture to the Medici court in Florence, and the Lives promoted, with enduring success, the idea of Florentine superiority in the visual arts.

Vasari designed the Tomb of Michelangelo, his hero, in the Basilica of Santa Croce, Florence, which was completed in 1578. Based on Vasari's text in print about Giotto's new manner of painting as a rinascita (rebirth), author Jules Michelet, in his Histoire de France (1835), suggested the adoption of Vasari's concept, using the term Renaissance (from French) to distinguish the cultural change. The term was adopted thereafter in historiography and remains in use.

== Life ==
Vasari was born prematurely on 30 July 1511 in Arezzo, Tuscany. Recommended at an early age by his cousin Luca Signorelli, he became a pupil of Guglielmo da Marsiglia, a skillful painter of stained glass. Sent to Florence at the age of sixteen by Cardinal Silvio Passerini, he joined the circle of Andrea del Sarto and his pupils, Rosso Fiorentino and Jacopo Pontormo, where his humanist education was encouraged. He was befriended by Michelangelo, whose painting style would influence his own. Vasari enjoyed high repute during his lifetime and amassed a considerable fortune. He married Niccolosa Bacci, a member of one of the richest and most prominent families of Arezzo. He was made Knight of the Golden Spur by the Pope. He was elected to the municipal council of his native town and rose to the supreme office of gonfaloniere.

Vasari built a fine house in Arezzo in 1547 and decorated its walls and vaults with paintings. It is now a museum in his honour named the Casa Vasari, whilst his residence in Florence is also preserved. In 1563, he helped found the Florentine Accademia e Compagnia delle Arti del Disegno, with Grand Duke Cosimo I de' Medici and Michelangelo as capi of the institution. Thirty-six artists were chosen as members. He died on 27 June 1574 in Florence, Grand Duchy of Tuscany, aged 62.

== Painting ==
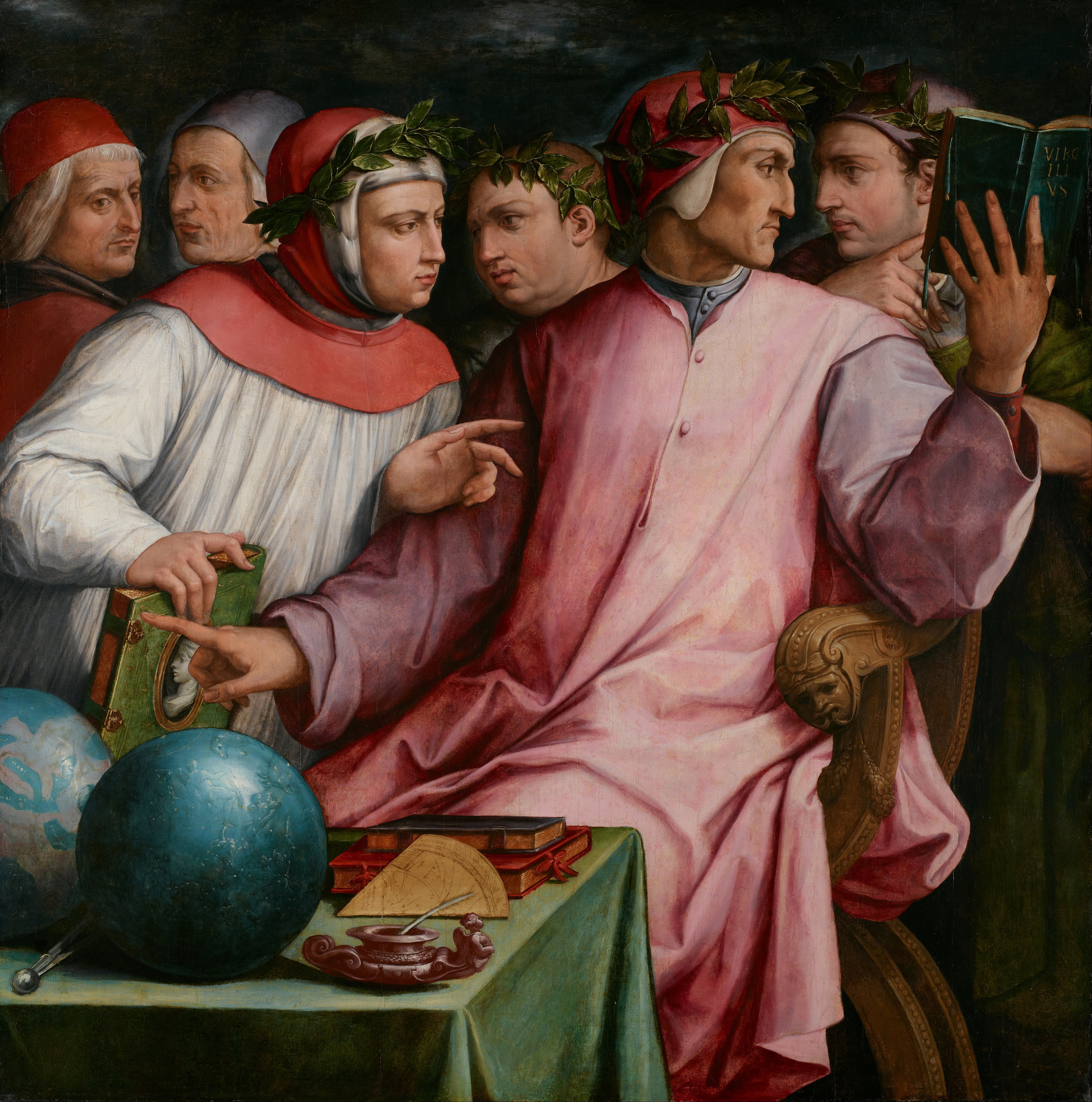
Six Tuscan Poets by Giorgio Vasari, c. 1544; from left to right: Cristoforo Landino, Marsilio Ficino, Francesco Petrarca, Giovanni Boccaccio, Dante Alighieri, and Guido Cavalcanti

In 1529, he visited Rome where he studied the works of Raphael and other artists of the Roman High Renaissance. Vasari's own Mannerist paintings were more admired in his lifetime than afterwards. In 1547, he completed the hall of the chancery in Palazzo della Cancelleria in Rome with frescoes that received the name Sala dei Cento Giorni. He was regularly employed by members of the Medici family in Florence and Rome. He also worked in Naples (for example, on the Vasari Sacristy), Arezzo, and other places. Many of his paintings still exist, the most important being on the wall and ceiling of the Sala di Cosimo I in the Palazzo Vecchio in Florence, where he and his assistants worked from 1555. Vasari also helped to organize the decoration of the Studiolo, now reassembled in the Palazzo Vecchio.

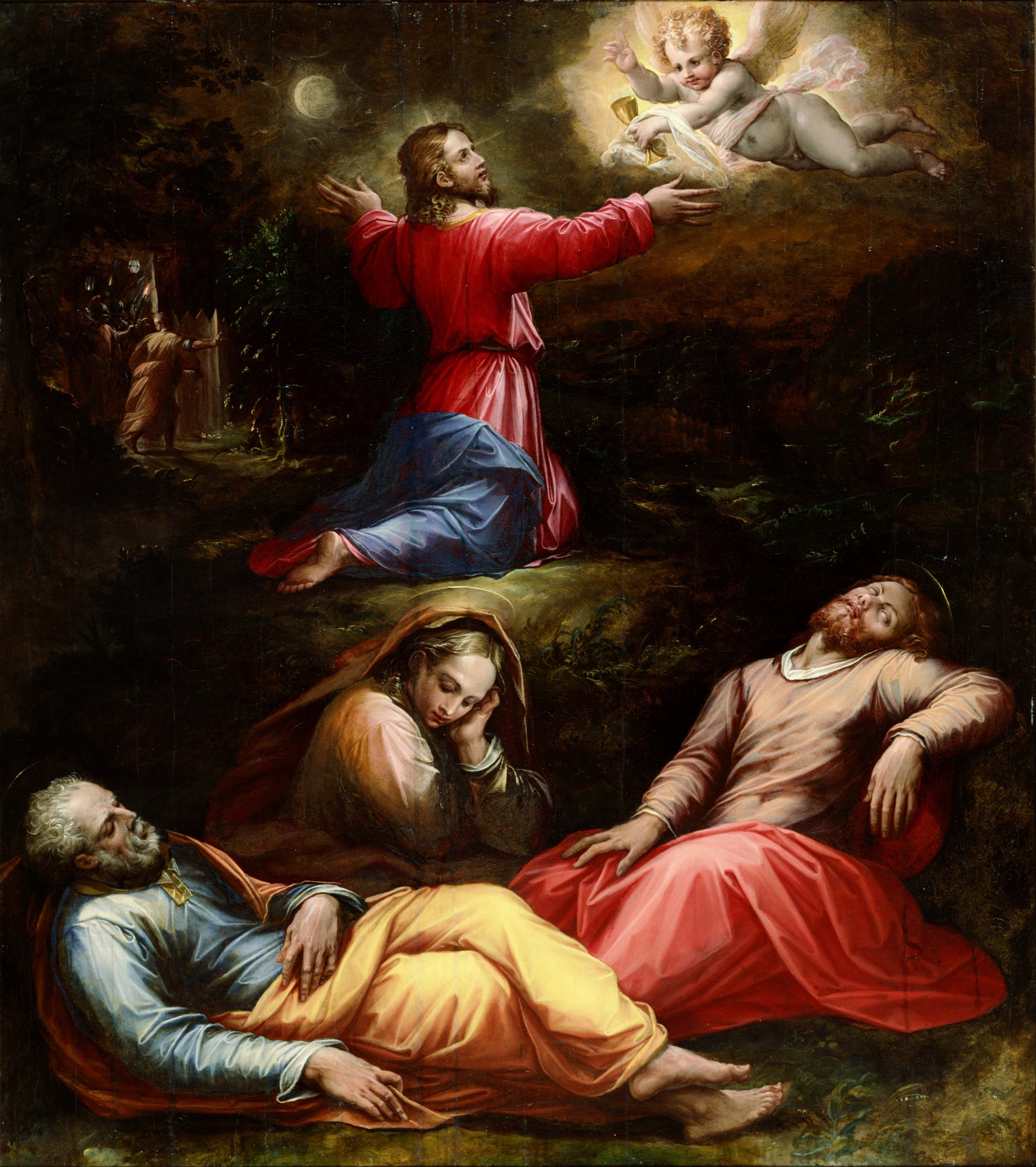
The Garden of Gethsemane by Giorgio Vasari

In Rome, Vasari painted frescos in the Sala Regia. Among his better-known pupils or followers are Sebastiano Flori, Bartolomeo Carducci, Mirabello Cavalori (Salincorno), Stefano Veltroni (of Monte San Savino), and Alessandro Fortori (of Arezzo). His last major commission was a vast The Last Judgement fresco on the ceiling of the cupola of the Florence Cathedral that he began in 1572 with the assistance of the Bolognese painter Lorenzo Sabatini. Unfinished at the time of Vasari's death, it was completed by Federico Zuccari.

== Architecture ==
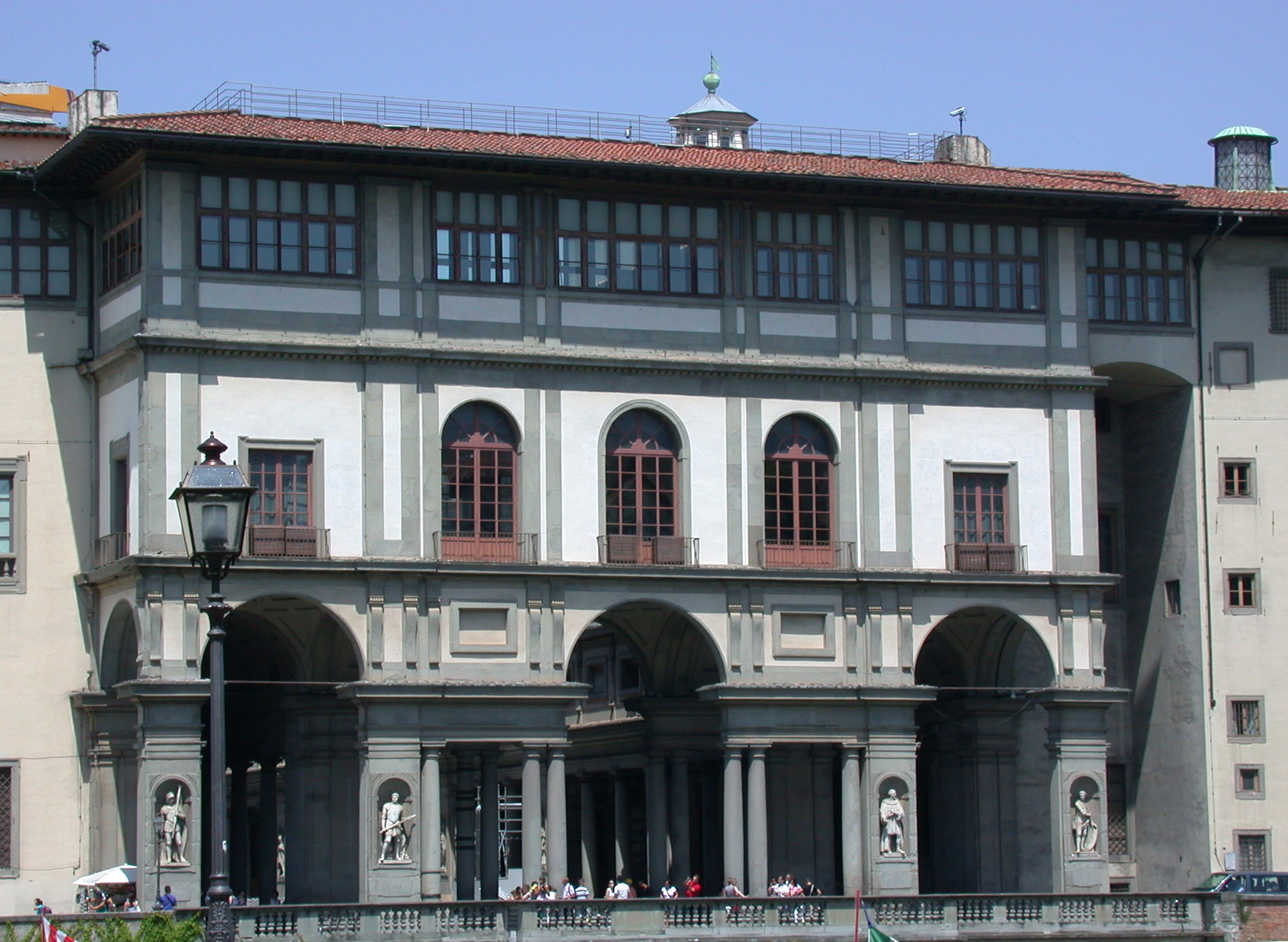
The Uffizi Loggia

As well as a painter, Vasari was an architect. His loggia of the Palazzo degli Uffizi by the Arno opens up the vista with a long, narrow courtyard. It functions as a public piazza, and is unique as a Renaissance street with a unified architectural treatment. The view of the Loggia from the Arno reveals that the Vasari Corridor is one of very few structures lining the river that is open to the riverbank.

In Florence, Vasari also designed the Vasari Corridor, which connects the Uffizi with the Palazzo Pitti on the other side of the river. The corridor passes alongside the River Arno on an arcade, crosses the Ponte Vecchio, and winds around the exterior of several buildings. It was once the location of the Mercado de Vecchio. He renovated the medieval churches of Santa Maria Novella and Santa Croce. In both buildings, he removed the original rood screen and loft, and remodeled the retro-choirs in the Mannerist taste of his time.

In Santa Croce, Vasari produced the painting The Adoration of the Magi, commissioned by Pope Pius V in 1566 and completed in February 1567. It was recently restored before being exhibited in 2011 in Rome and Naples. It will eventually be returned to the church of Santa Croce in Bosco Marengo (Province of Alessandria, Piedmont). In 1562, Vasari built the octagonal dome on the Basilica of Our Lady of Humility in Pistoia, an important example of High Renaissance architecture. In Rome, Vasari worked with Giacomo Barozzi da Vignola and Bartolomeo Ammannati at Pope Julius III's Villa Giulia.

== The Lives of the Most Excellent Painters, Sculptors, and Architects ==
Often called "the first art historian", Vasari invented the genre of the encyclopedia of artistic biographies with his Le Vite de' più eccellenti pittori, scultori, e architettori (Lives of the Most Excellent Painters, Sculptors, and Architects). The work proved seminal in presenting the development of art as a history of heroic creators, of exceptional individuals. Le Vite was first published in 1550 and was dedicated to Grand Duke Cosimo I de' Medici. Vasari introduced the term "Rinascita" ("rebirth" in Italian) in printed works – although an awareness of an ongoing "rebirth" in the arts had been in the air since the time of Alberti. Vasari's term, applied to the change in artistic styles with the work of Giotto, eventually would become the French term Renaissance ("rebirth") widely applied to the era that followed. Vasari was responsible for the modern use of the term Gothic art, as well, although he only used the word Goth in association with the German style that preceded the rebirth, which he identified as "barbaric". The Lives also included a novel treatise on the technical methods employed in the arts. The book was partly rewritten and extended in 1568, with the addition of woodcut portraits of artists (some conjectural).

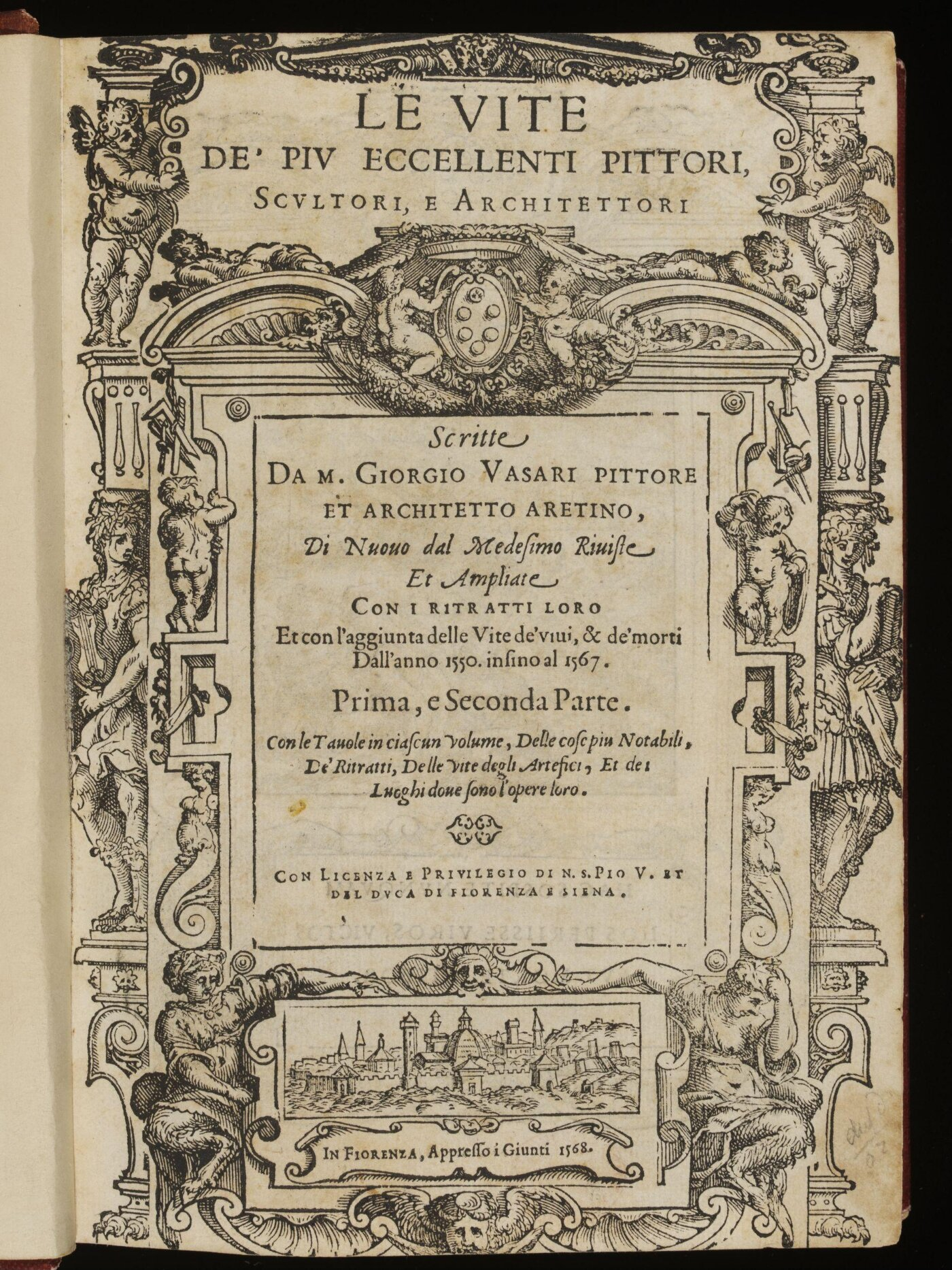
Title page of the first and second part of the 1568 edition of the Lives

The work shows a consistent and notorious bias in favour of Florentines and tends to attribute to them all the developments in Renaissance art – for example, the invention of engraving. Venetian art in particular (along with arts from other parts of Europe), is ignored systematically in the first edition. Between his first and second editions, Vasari visited Venice and while the second edition gave more attention to Venetian art (finally including Titian), it did so without achieving a neutral point of view.

Many inaccuracies exist within his Lives. For example, Vasari writes that Andrea del Castagno killed Domenico Veneziano, which is incorrect; Andrea died several years before Domenico. In another example, Vasari's biography of Giovanni Antonio Bazzi, whom he calls "Il Sodoma", published only in the second edition of the Lives (1568) after Bazzi's death, condemns the artist as being immoral, bestial, and vain. Vasari dismisses Bazzi's work as lazy and offensive, despite the artist's having been named a Cavalier of the Supreme Order of Christ by Pope Leo X and having received important commissions for the Villa Farnese and other sites.

Vasari's biographies are interspersed with amusing gossip. Many of his anecdotes seem plausible, while others are assumed fictions, such as the tale of young Giotto painting a fly on the surface of a painting by Cimabue that supposedly, the older master repeatedly tried to brush away (a genre tale that echoes anecdotes told of the Greek painter Apelles). He did carry out research archives for exact dates, as modern art historians do, and his biographies are considered more reliable in the case of his contemporary painters and those of the preceding generation. Modern criticism – with new materials produced by research – has revised many of his dates and facts. Vasari included a short autobiography at the end of the Lives, and added further details about himself and his family in his lives of Lazzaro Vasari and Francesco Salviati.

According to the historian Richard Goldthwaite, Vasari was one of the earliest authors to use the term "competition" (or "concorrenza" in Italian) in its economic sense. He used it repeatedly and stressed the concept in his introduction to the life of Pietro Perugino, in explaining the reasons for Florentine artistic preeminence. In Vasari's view, Florentine artists excelled because they were hungry, and they were hungry because their fierce competition amongst themselves for commissions kept them so. Competition, he said, is "one of the nourishments that maintain them".

== Gallery ==
Paintings by Giorgio Vasari

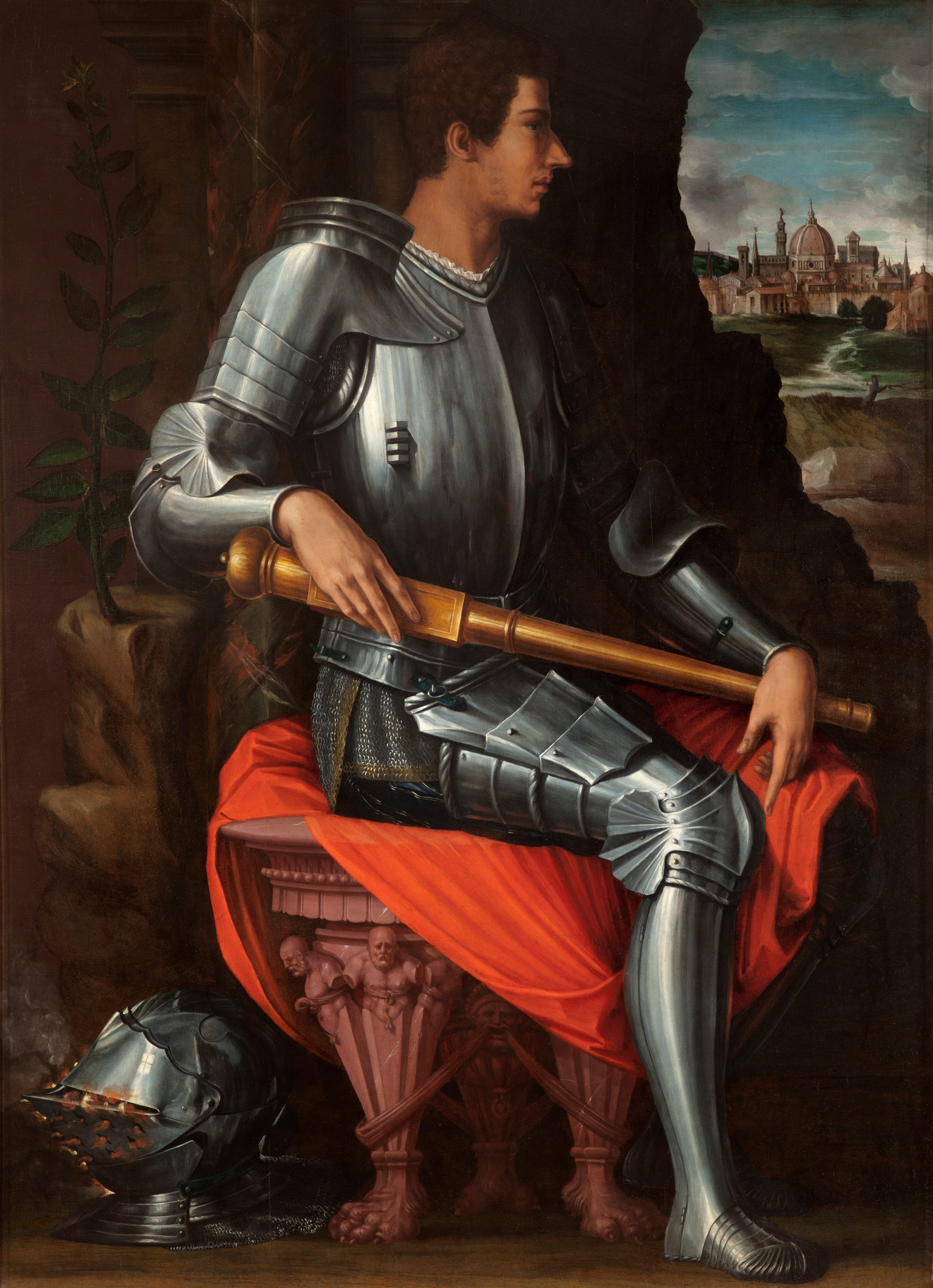
Alessandro de Medici Resting

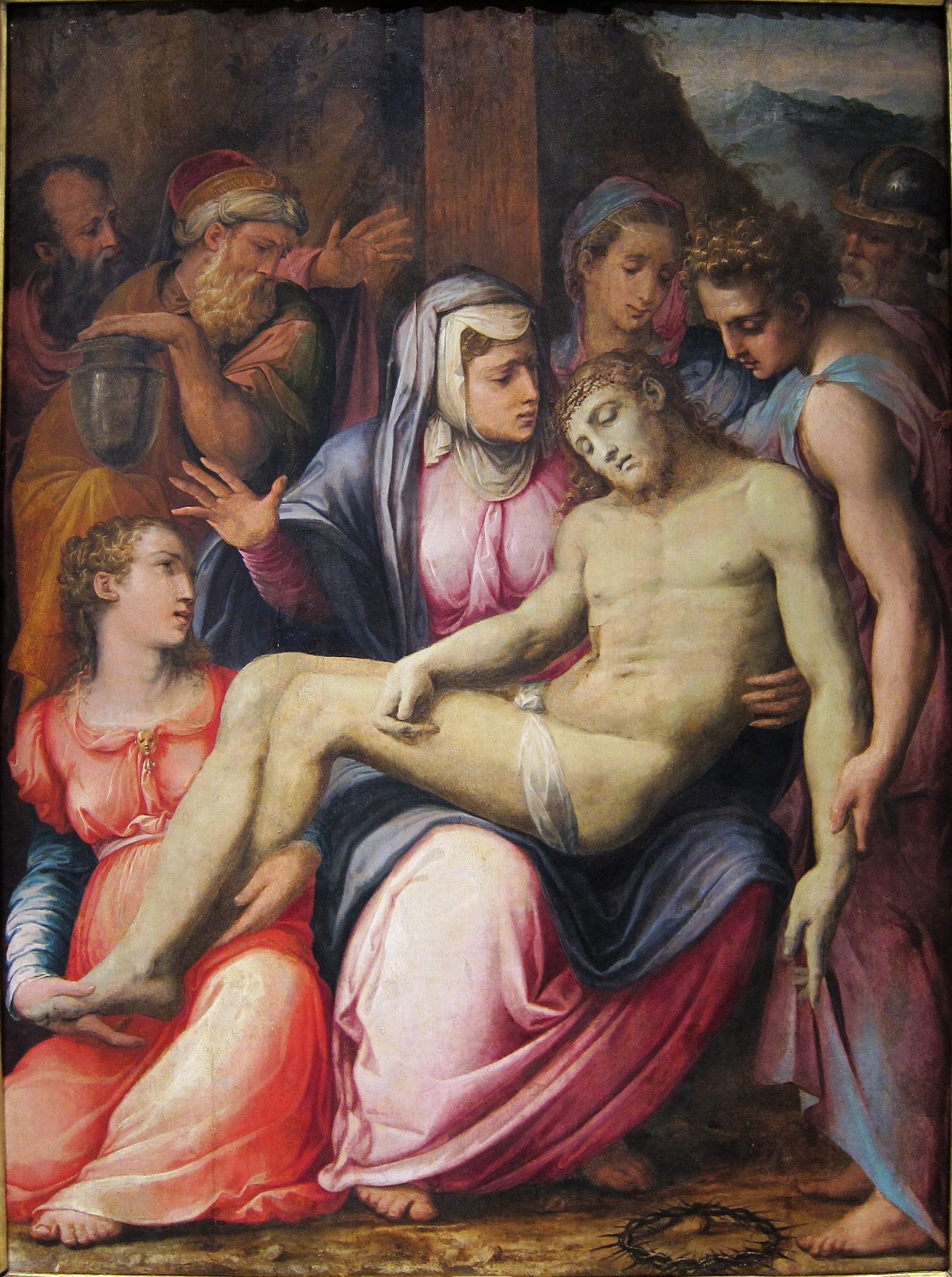
Pieta

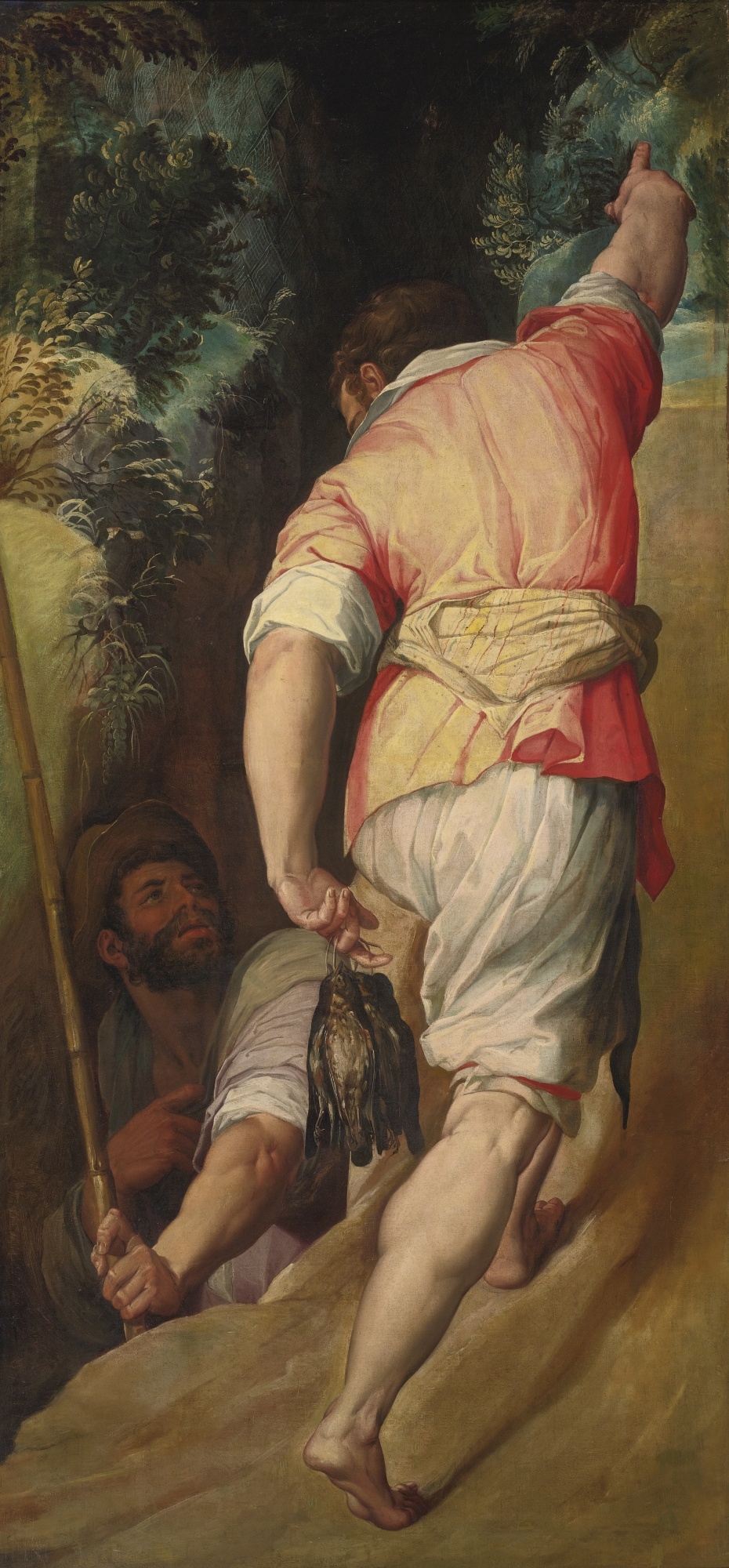
Bird catchers

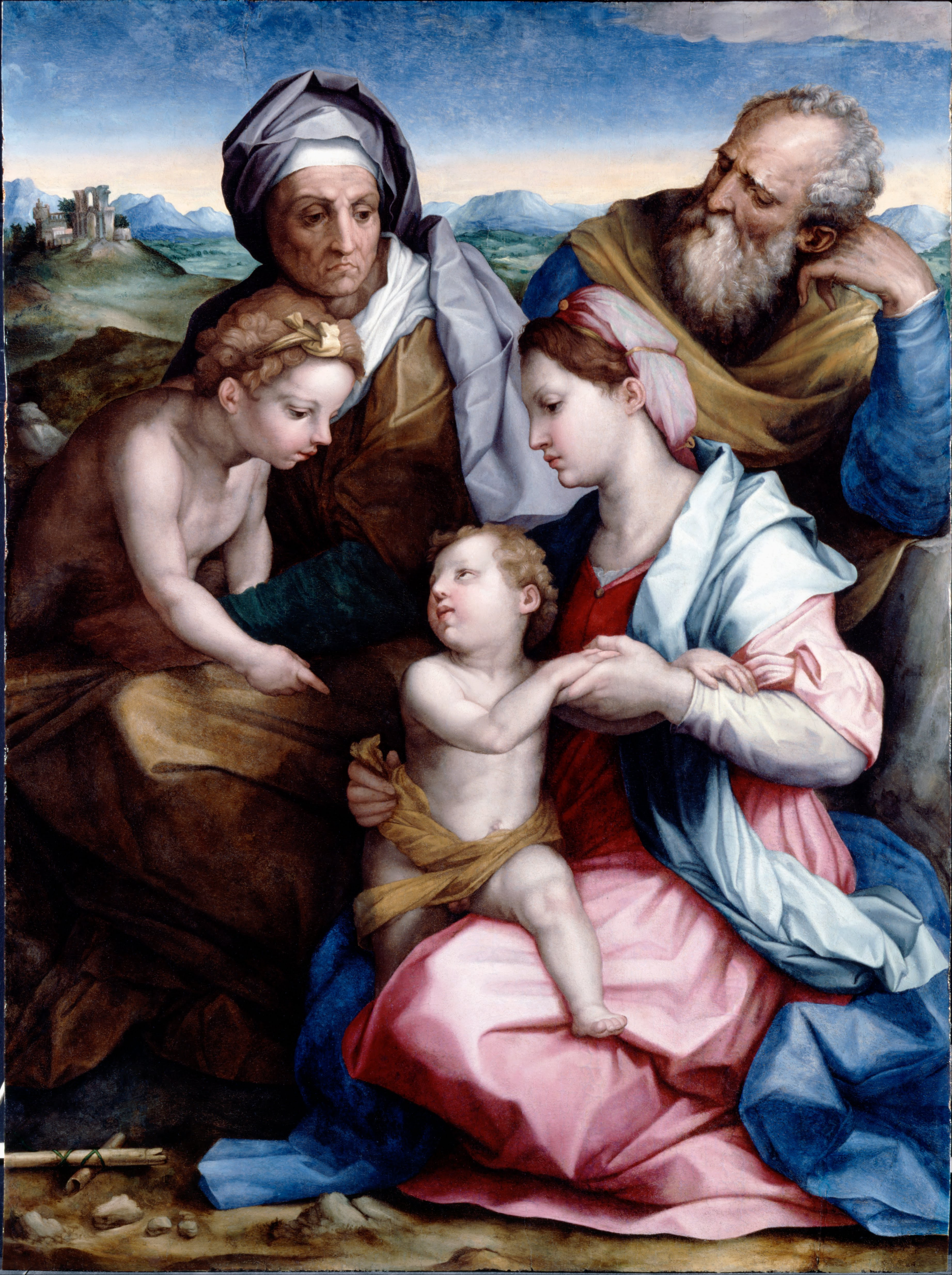
Holy Family, with Andrea del Sarto

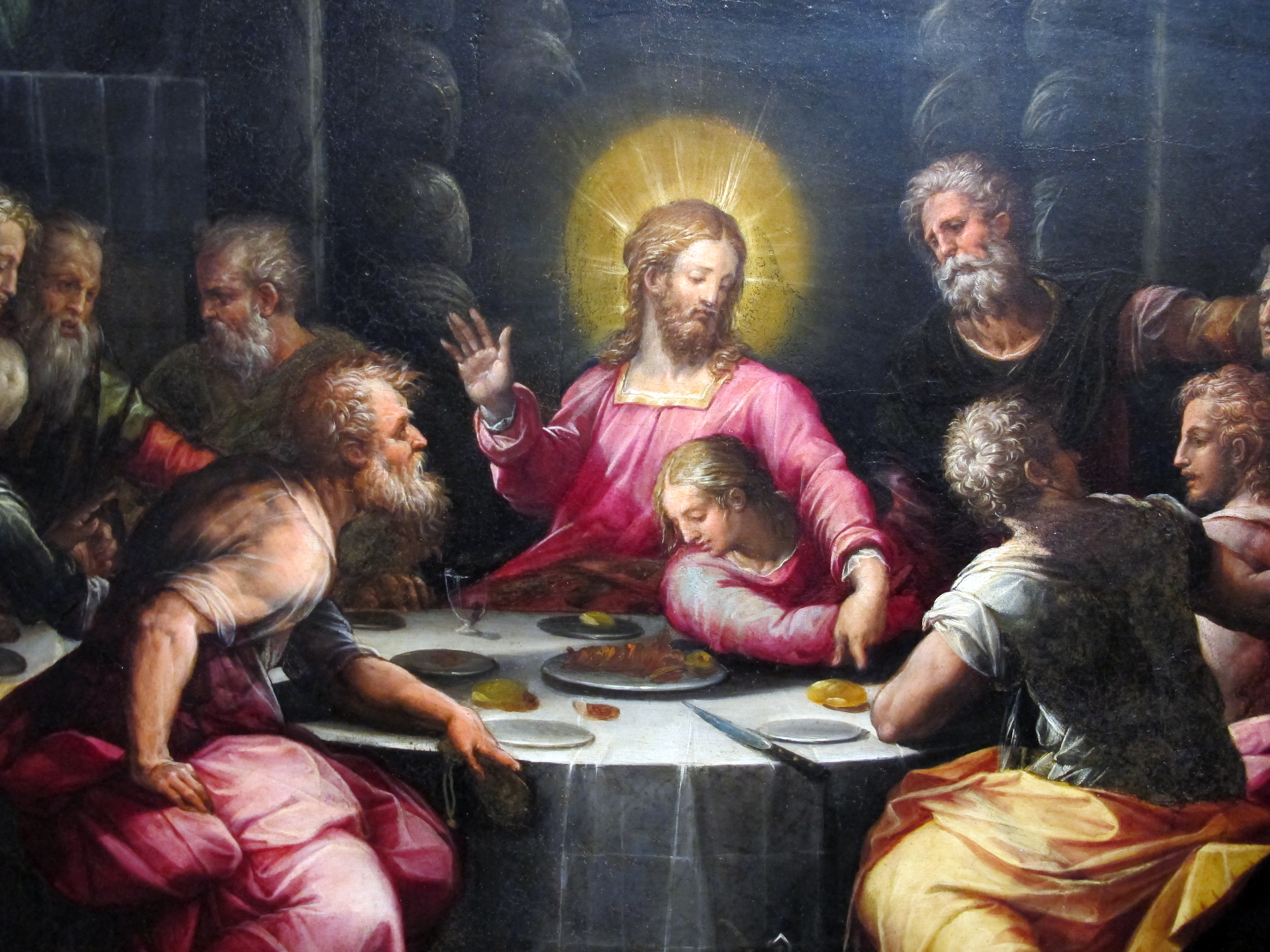
Last Supper

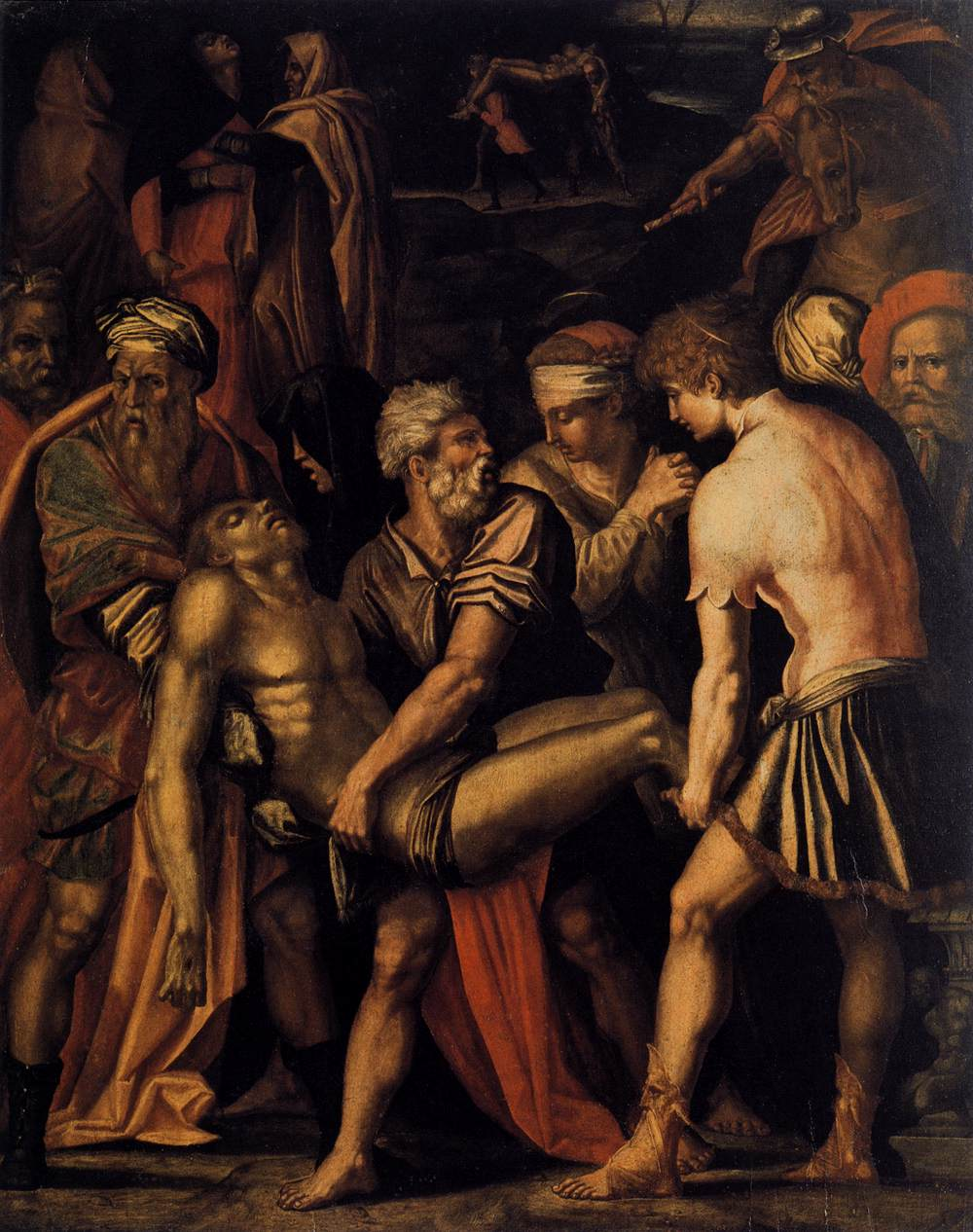
Entombment

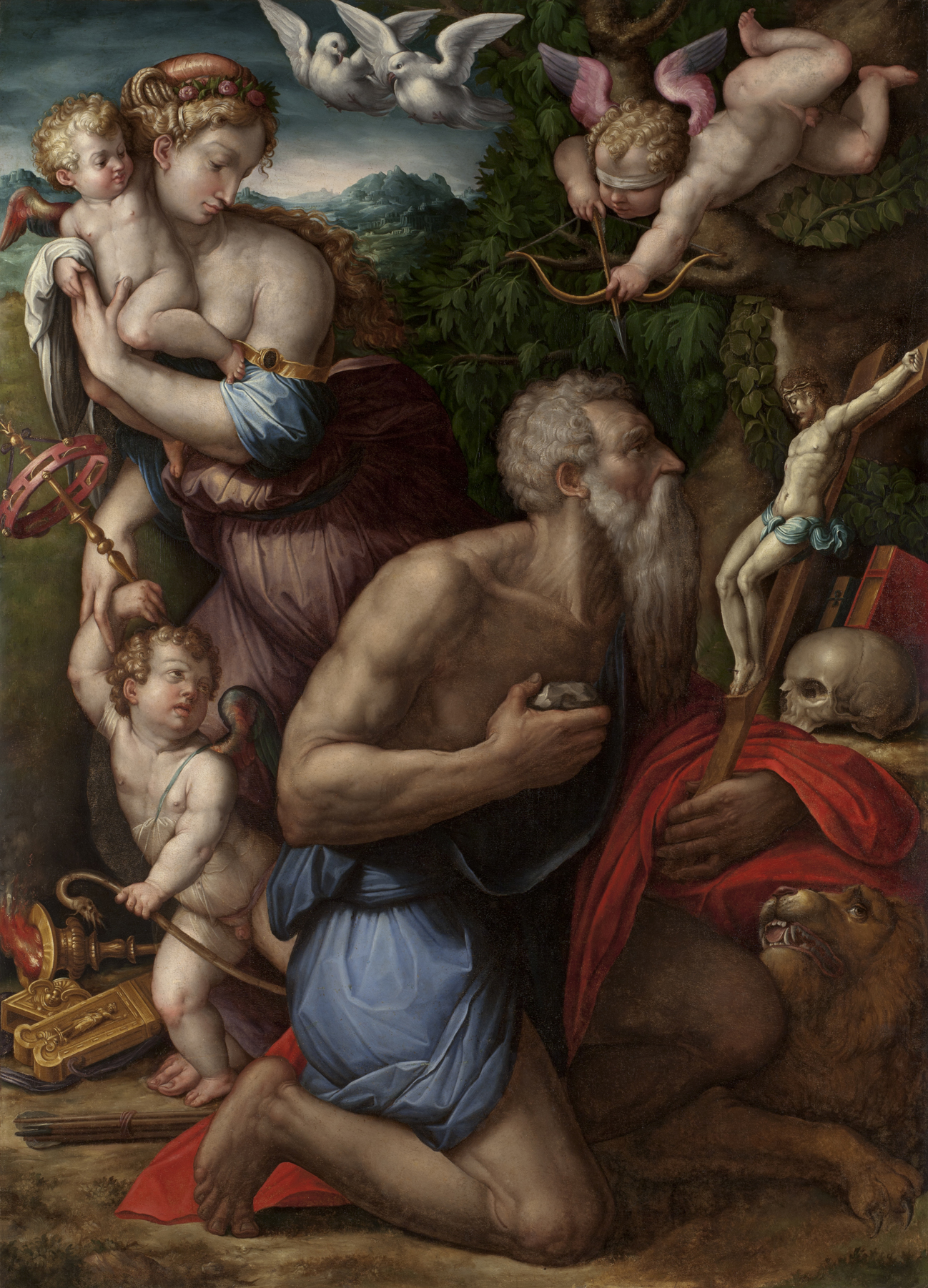
Temptations of St. Jerome

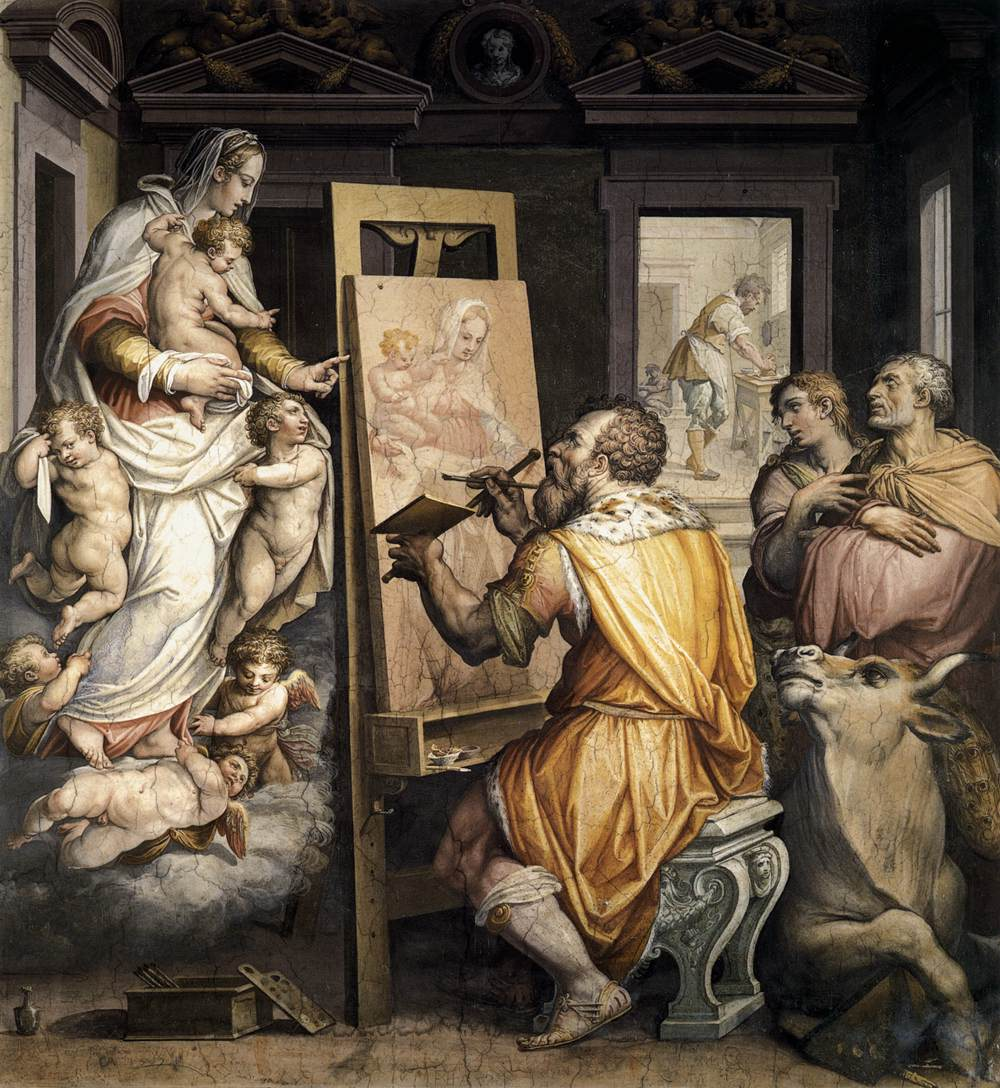
St. Luke painting the Virgin

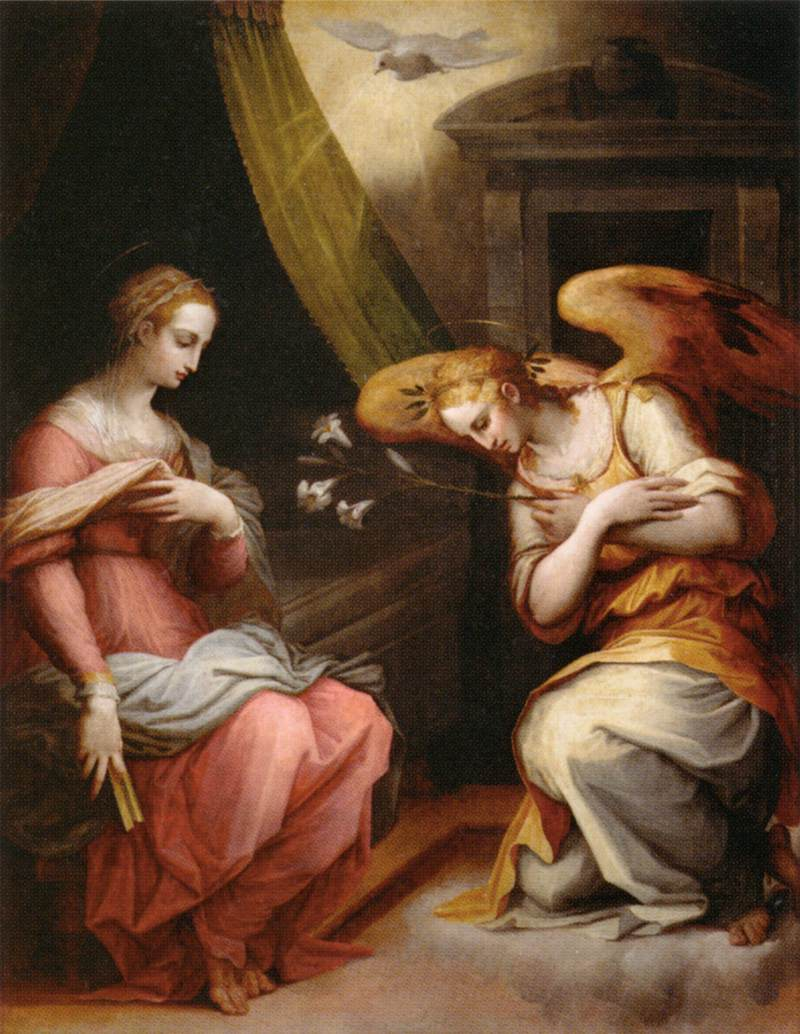
Annunciation

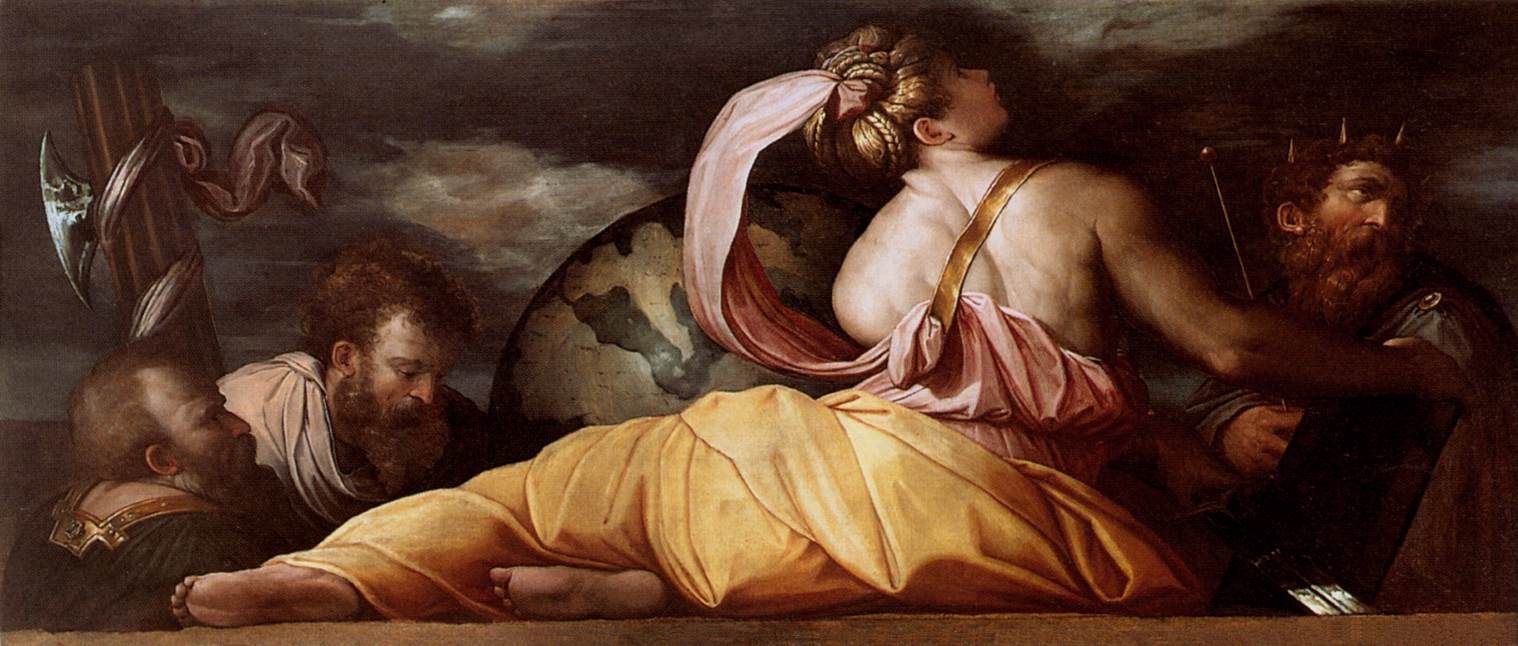
Justice

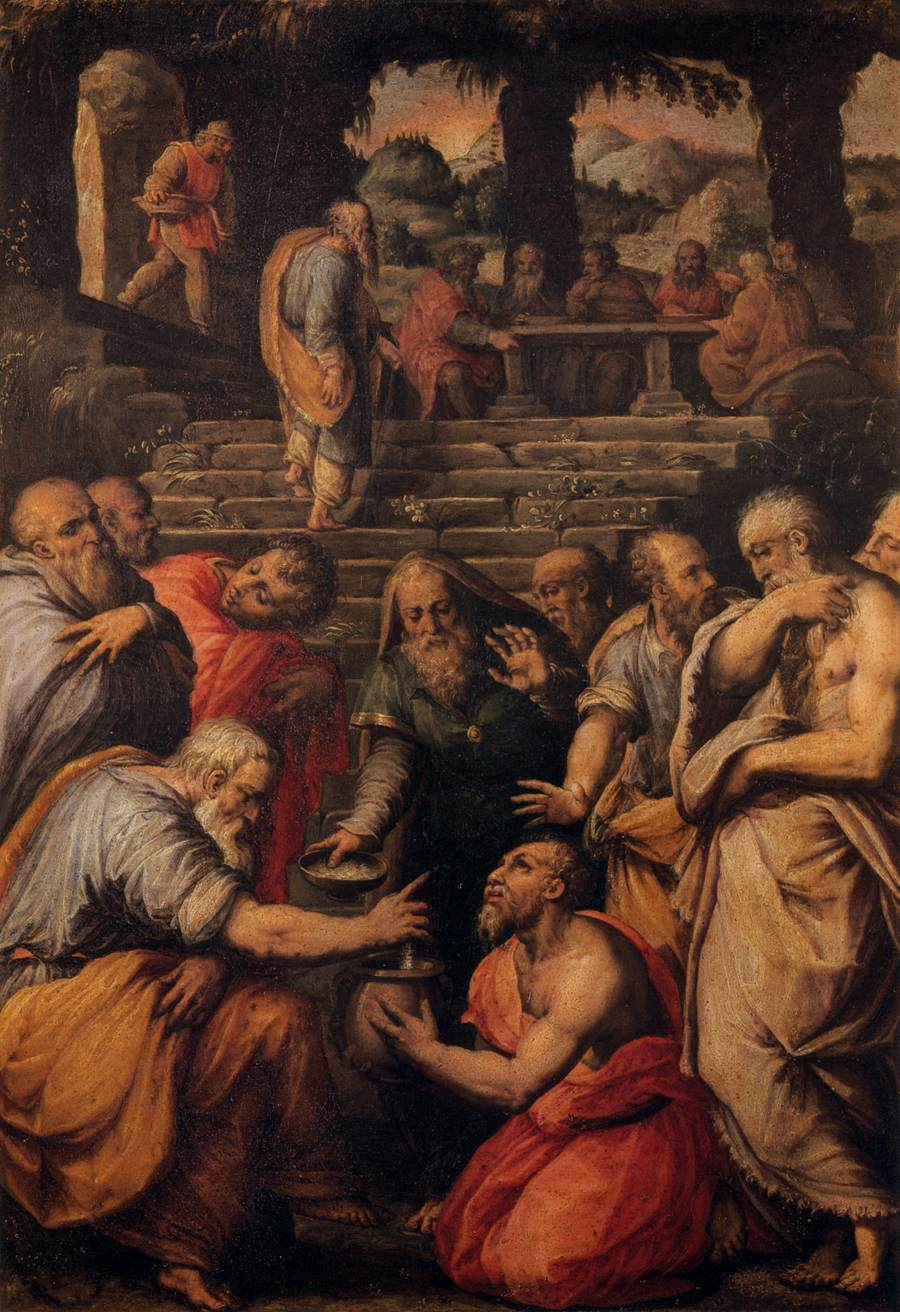
The Prophet Elisha
Frescos and decorations by Giorgio Vasari

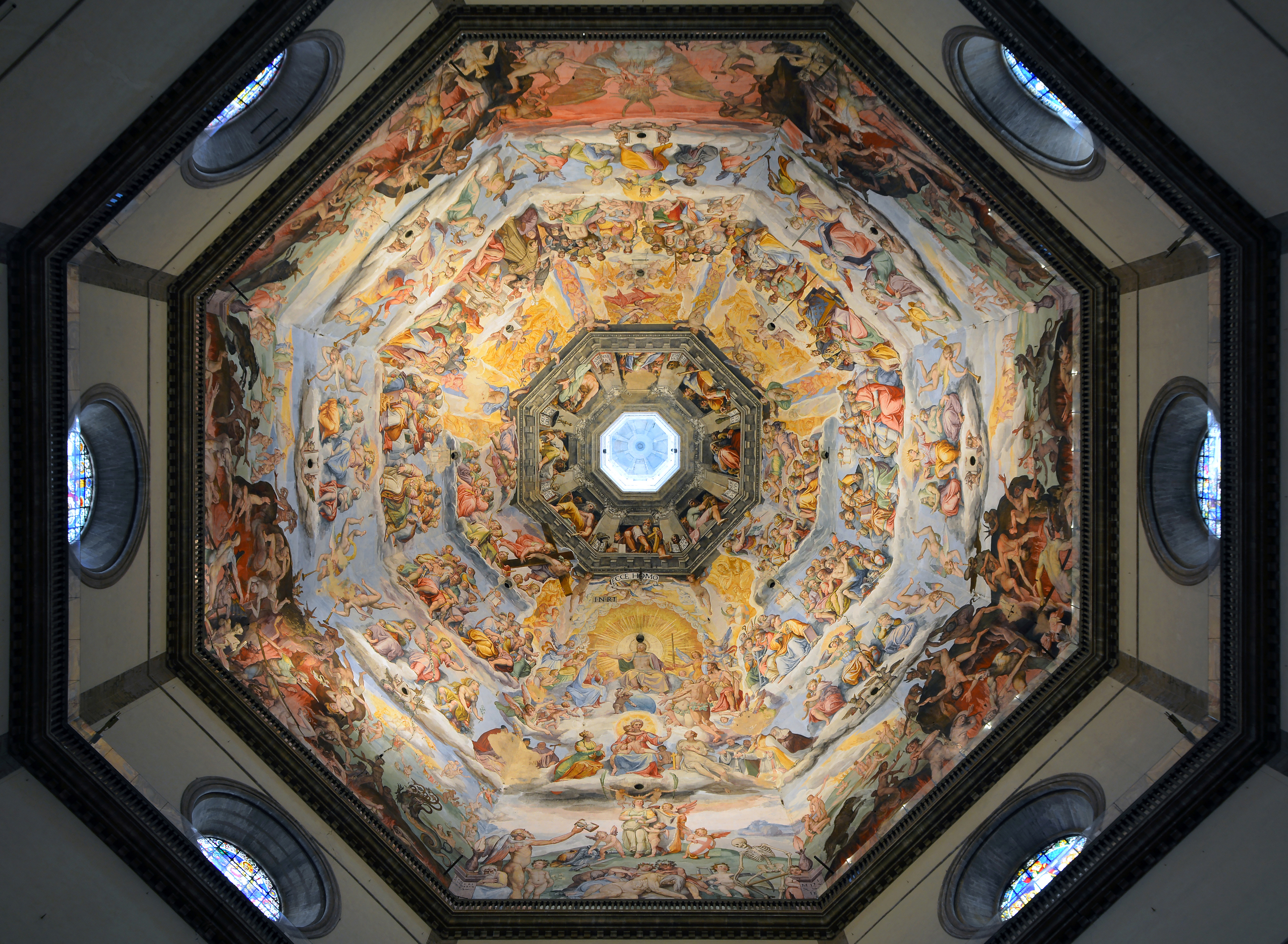
Interior of the dome of Florence Cathedral

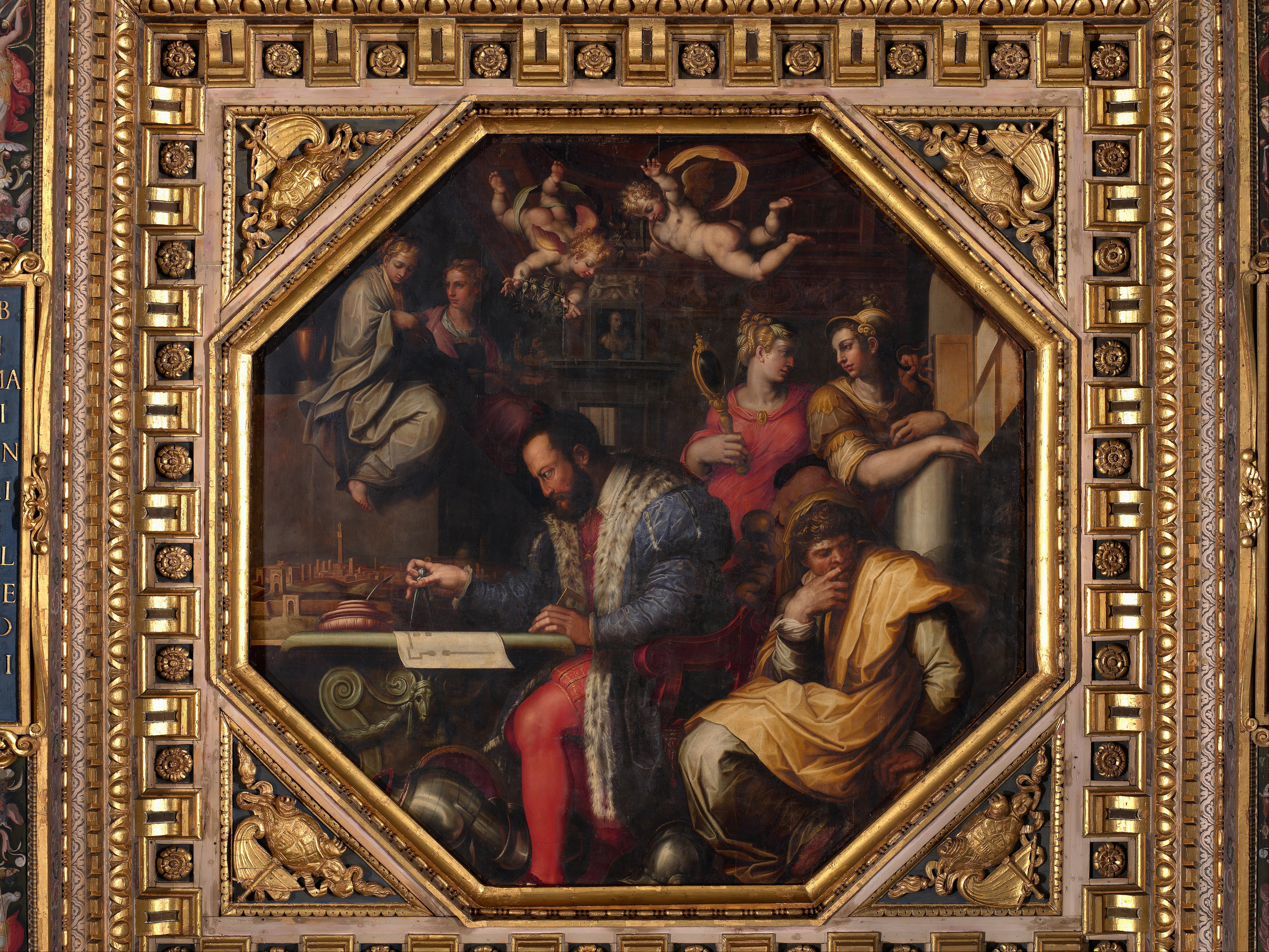
Cosimo studies the taking of Siena.

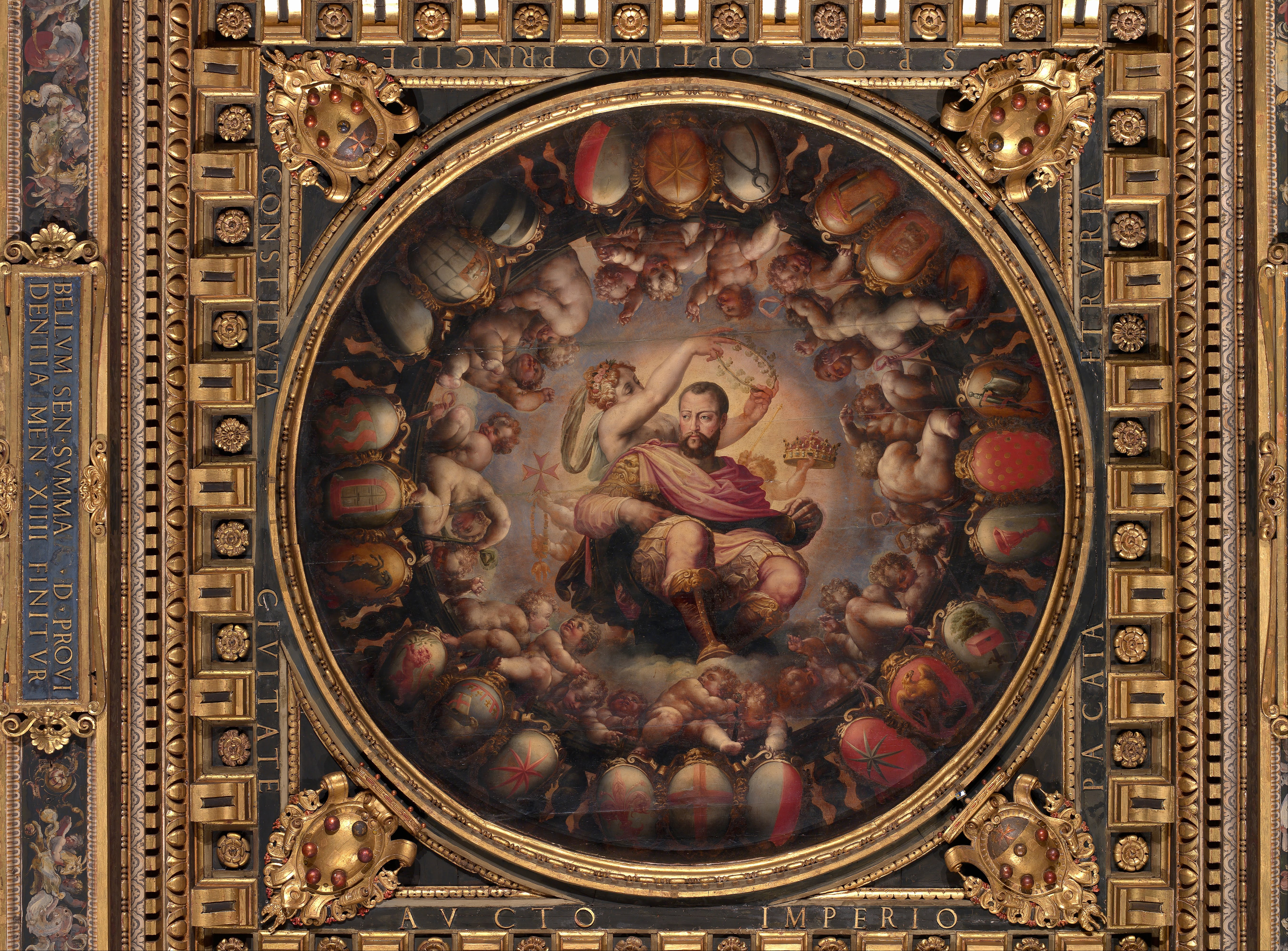
Apotheosis of
Cosimo I

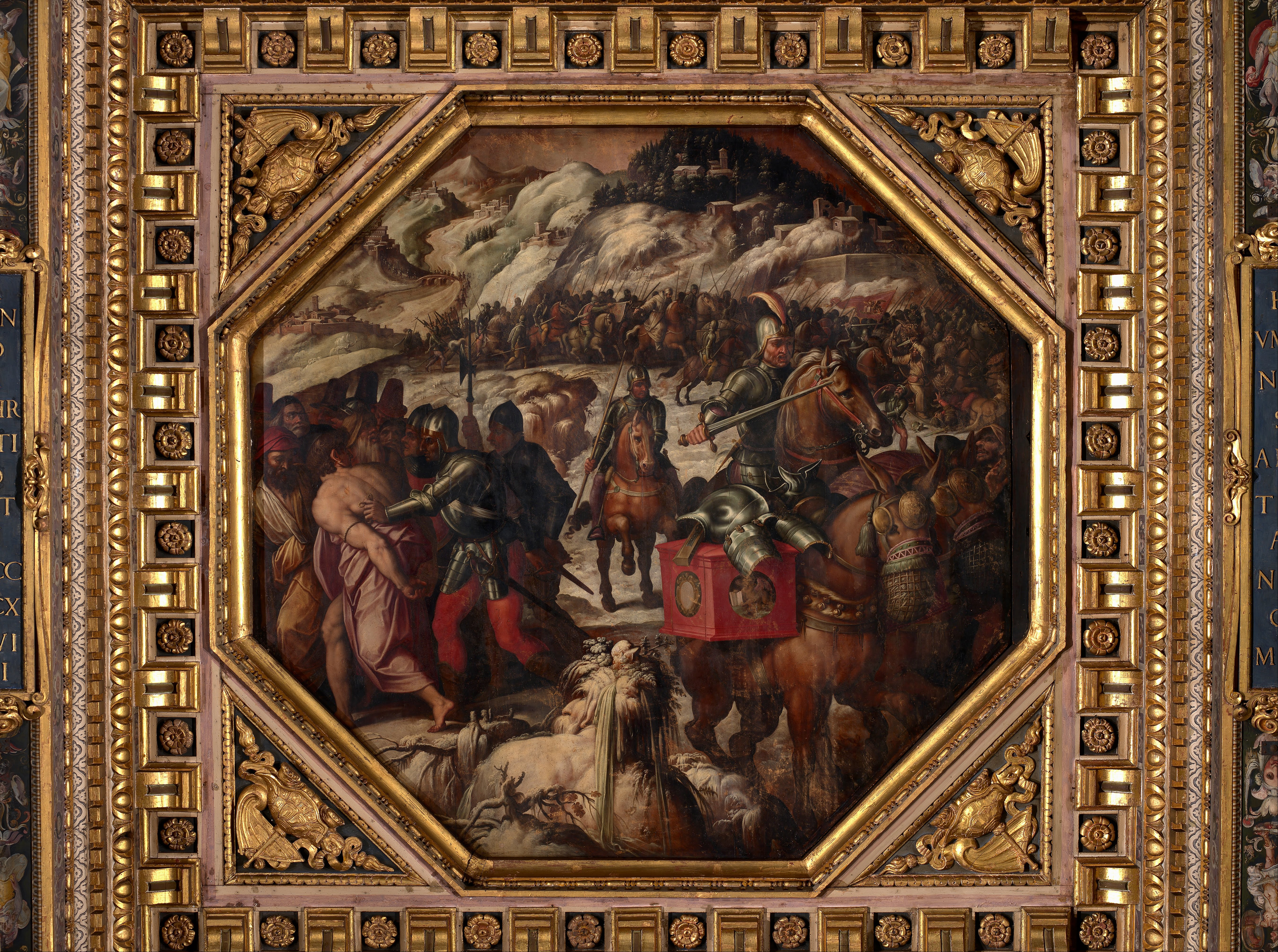
Defeat of the Venetians in Casentino
Libro de' Disegni by Giorgio Vasari

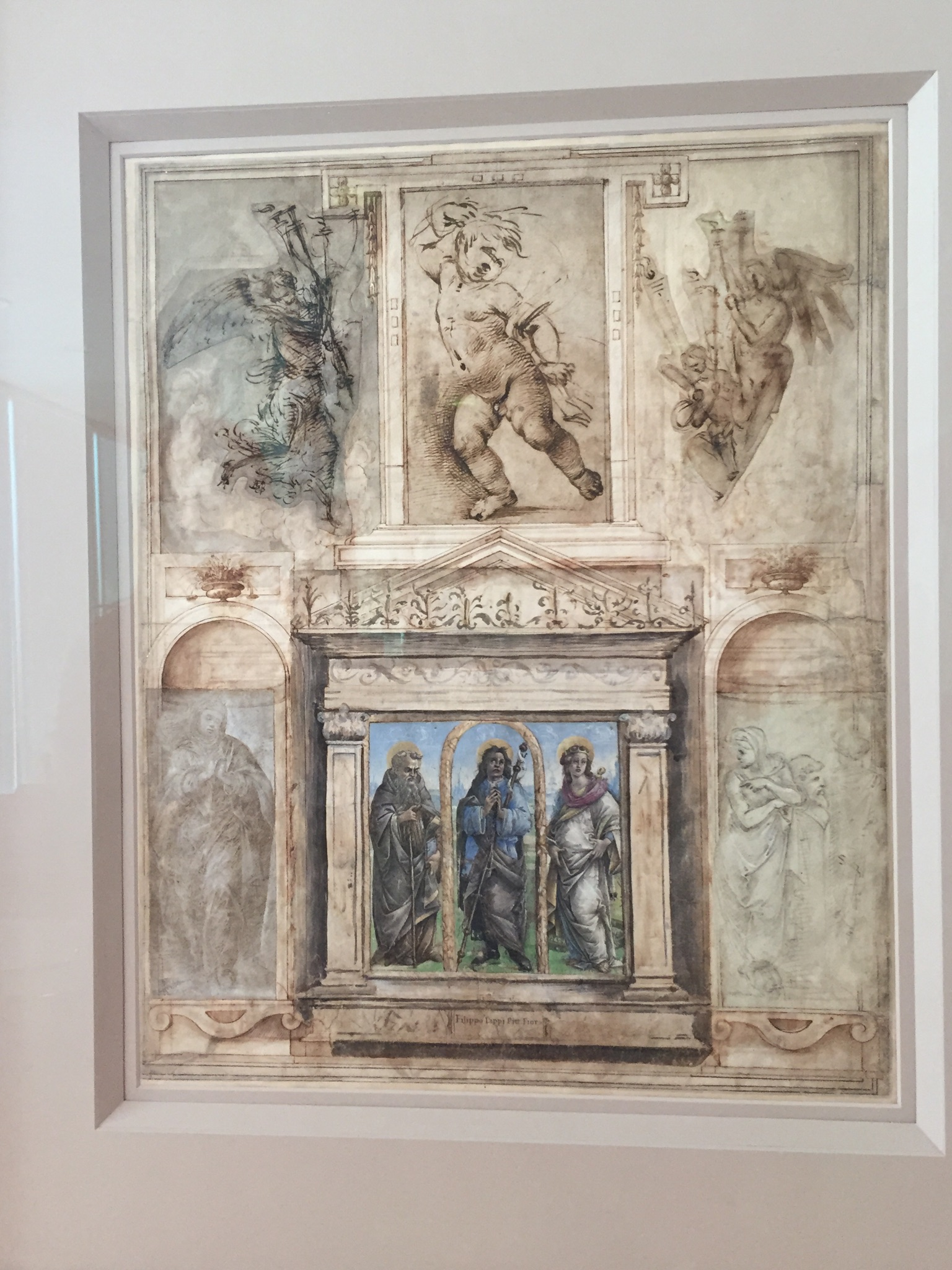
Giorgio Vasari with drawings by Filippino Lippi, Botticelli, and Raffaellino del Garbo

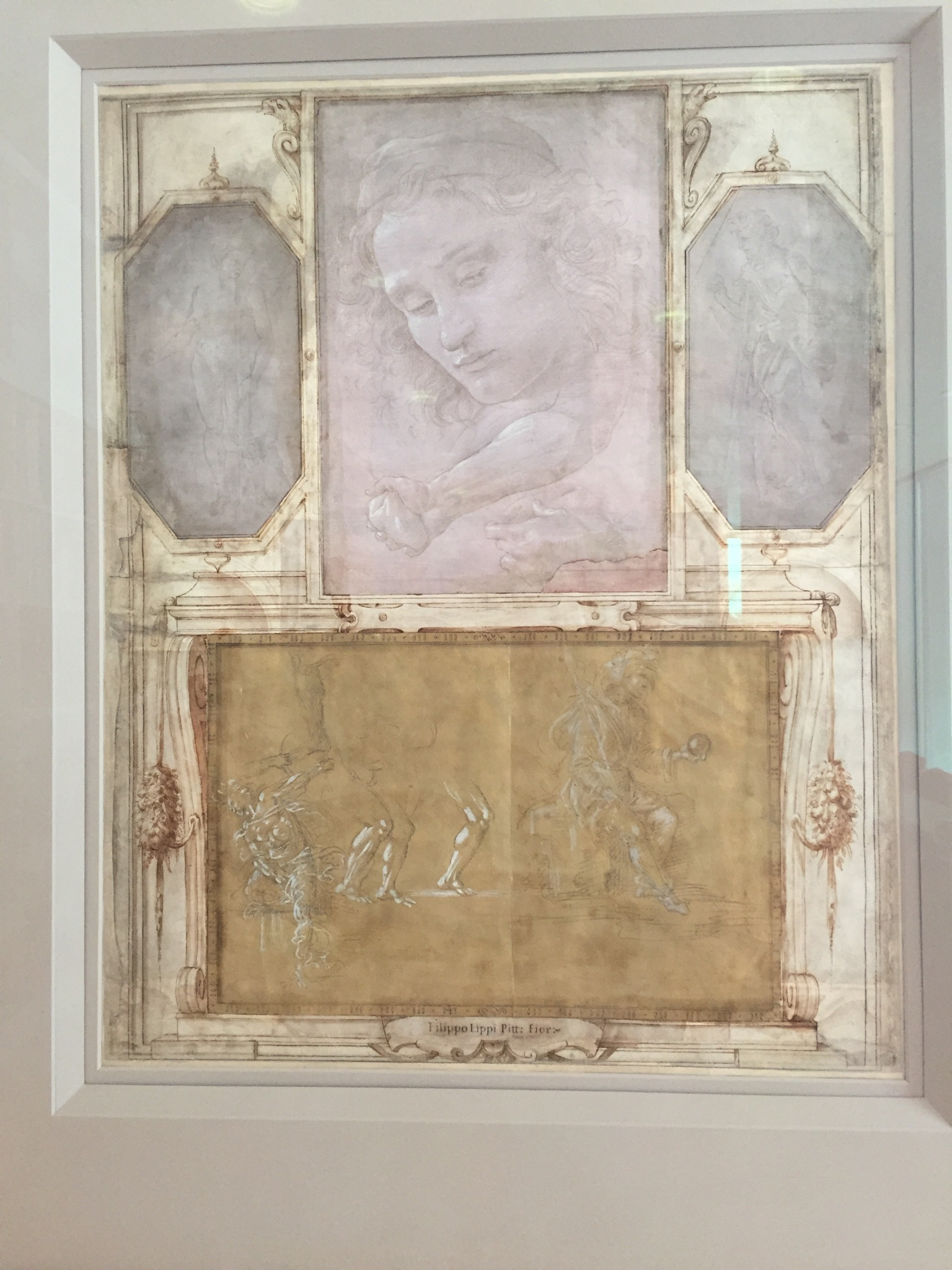
Giorgio Vasari with drawings by Filippino Lippi, Botticelli, and Raffaellino del Garbo
Architecture by Giorgio Vasari

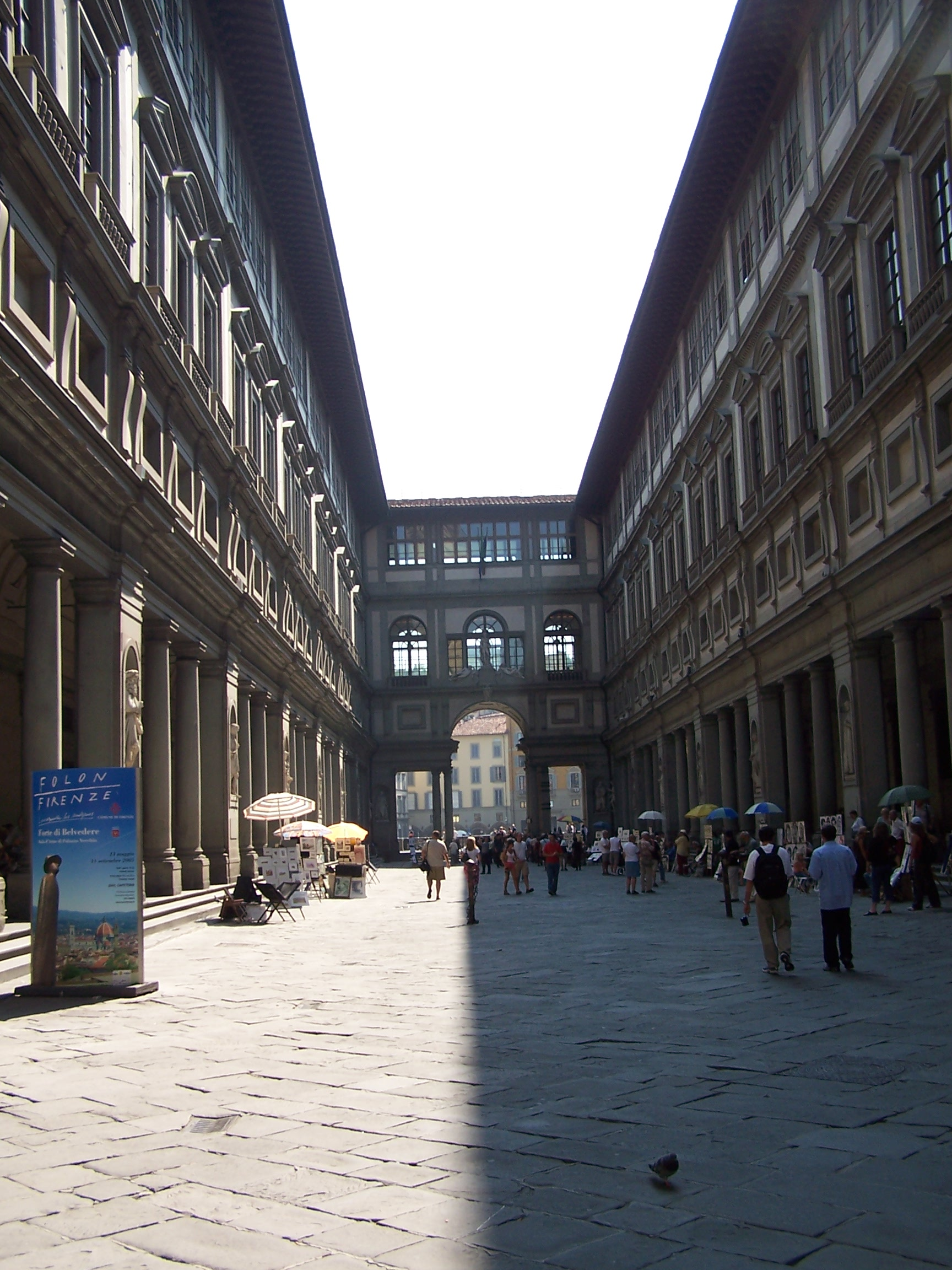
Uffizi colonnade and loggia

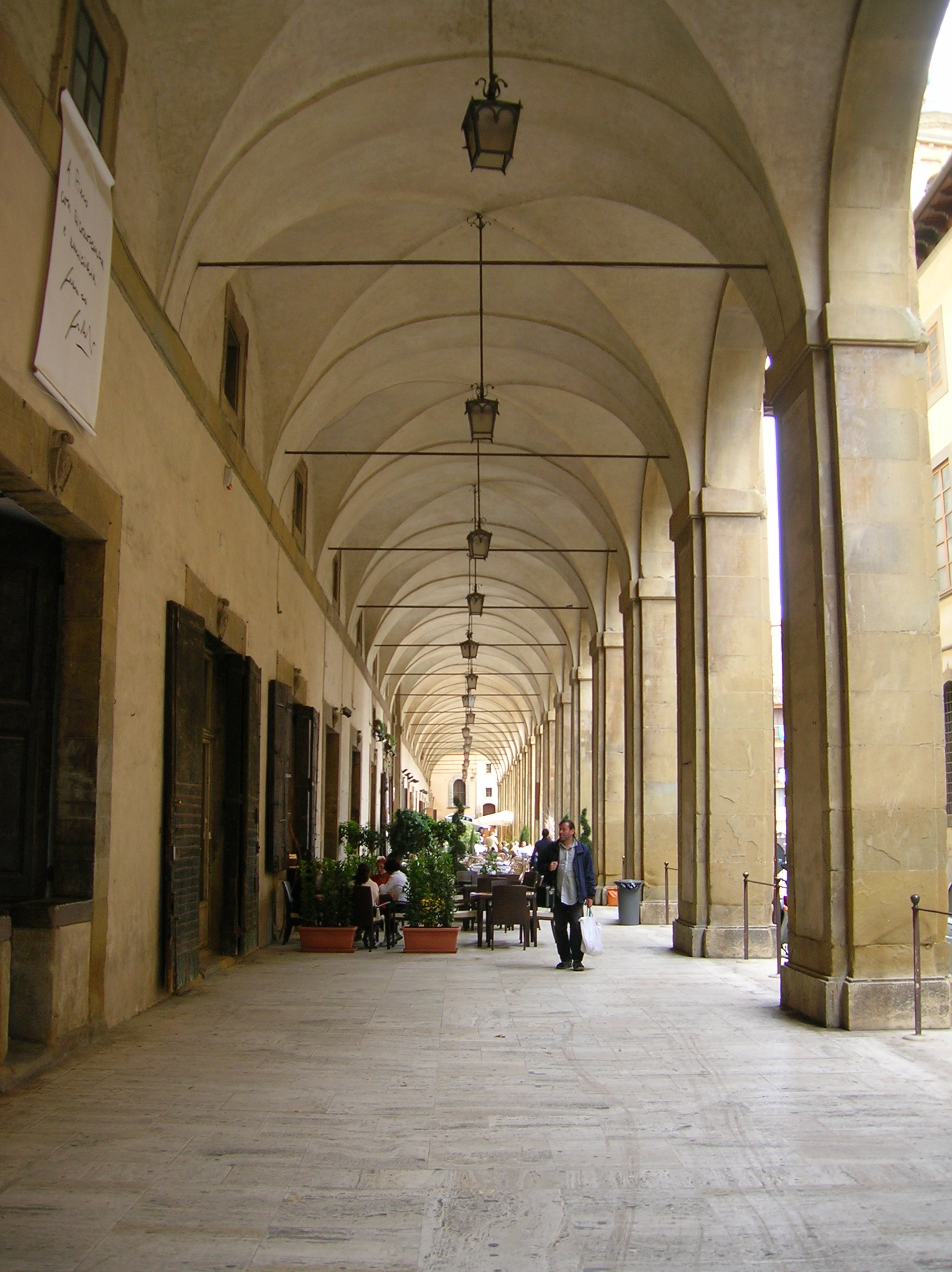
Loggia of Vasari in Arezzo

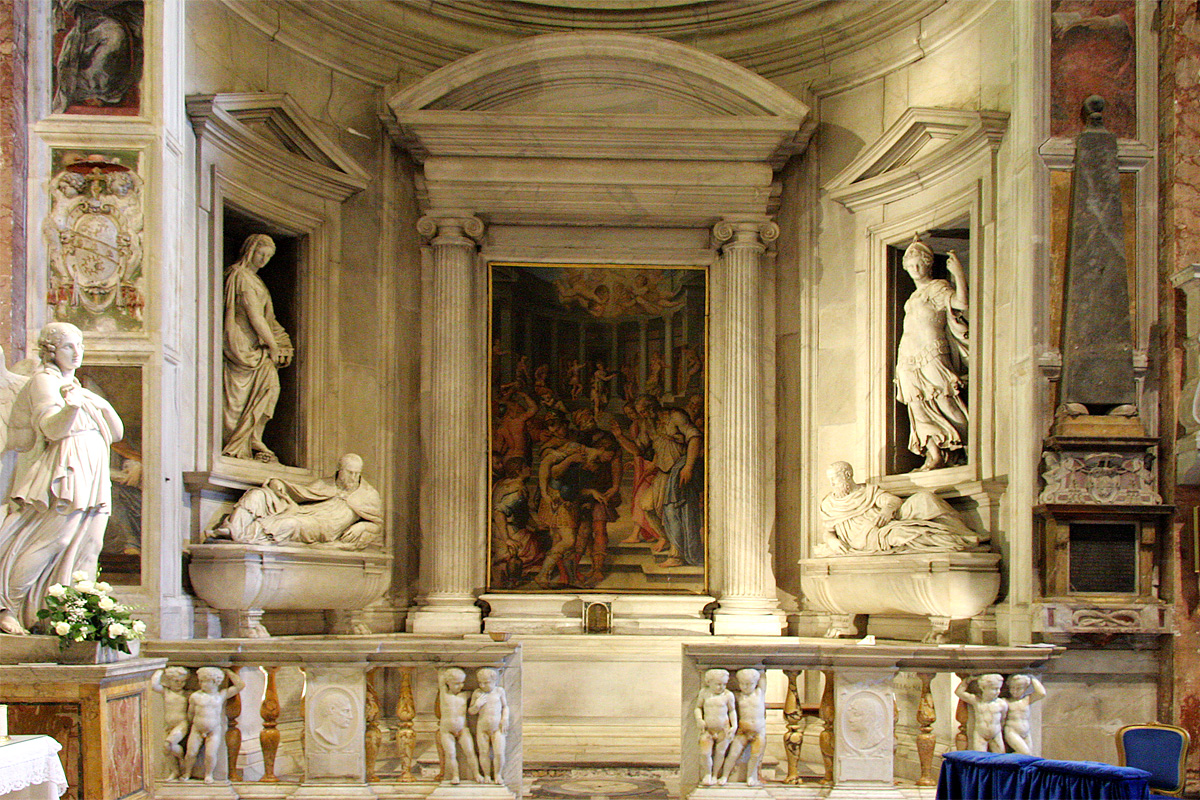
San Pietro in Montorio, Rome

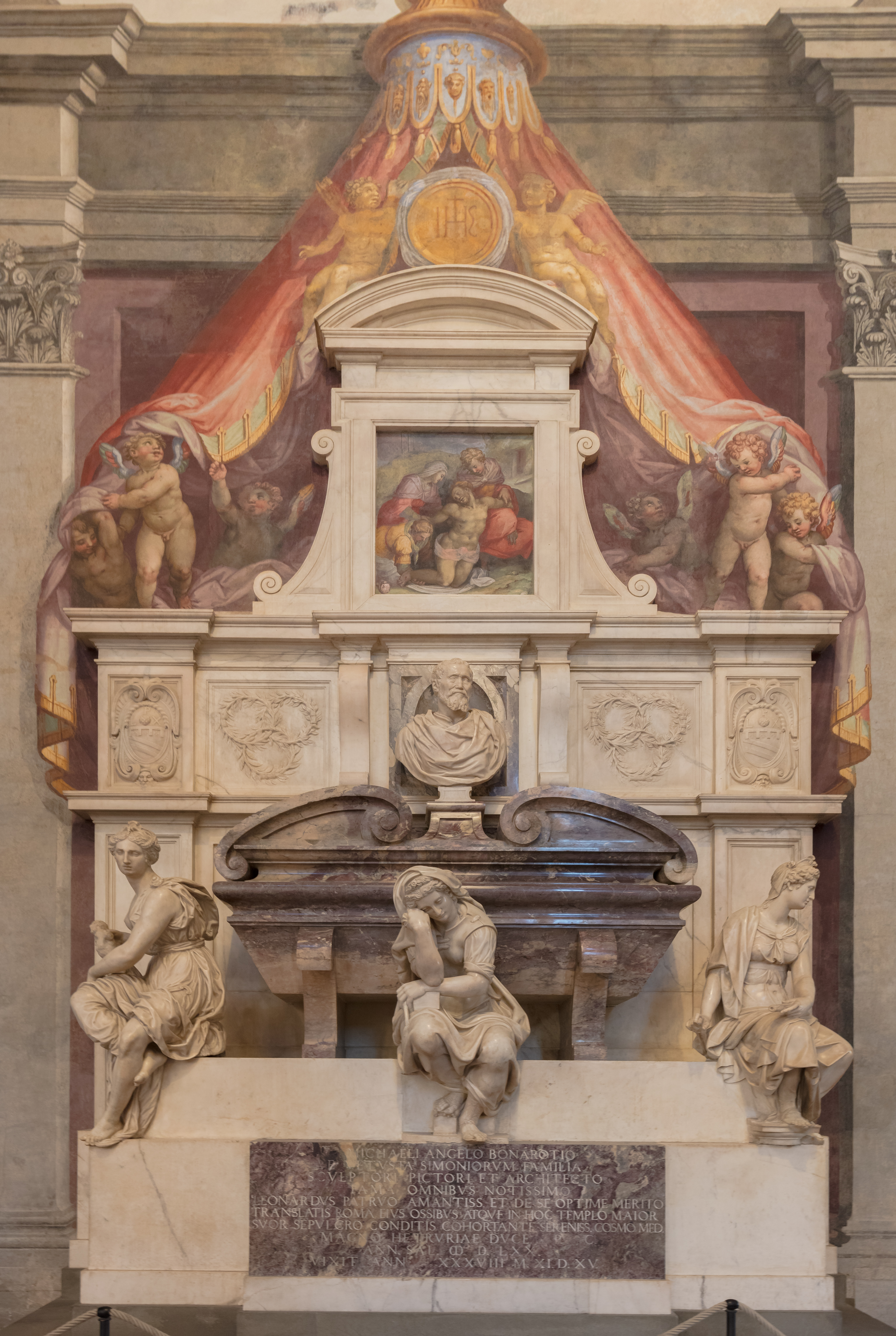
Tomb of Michelangelo

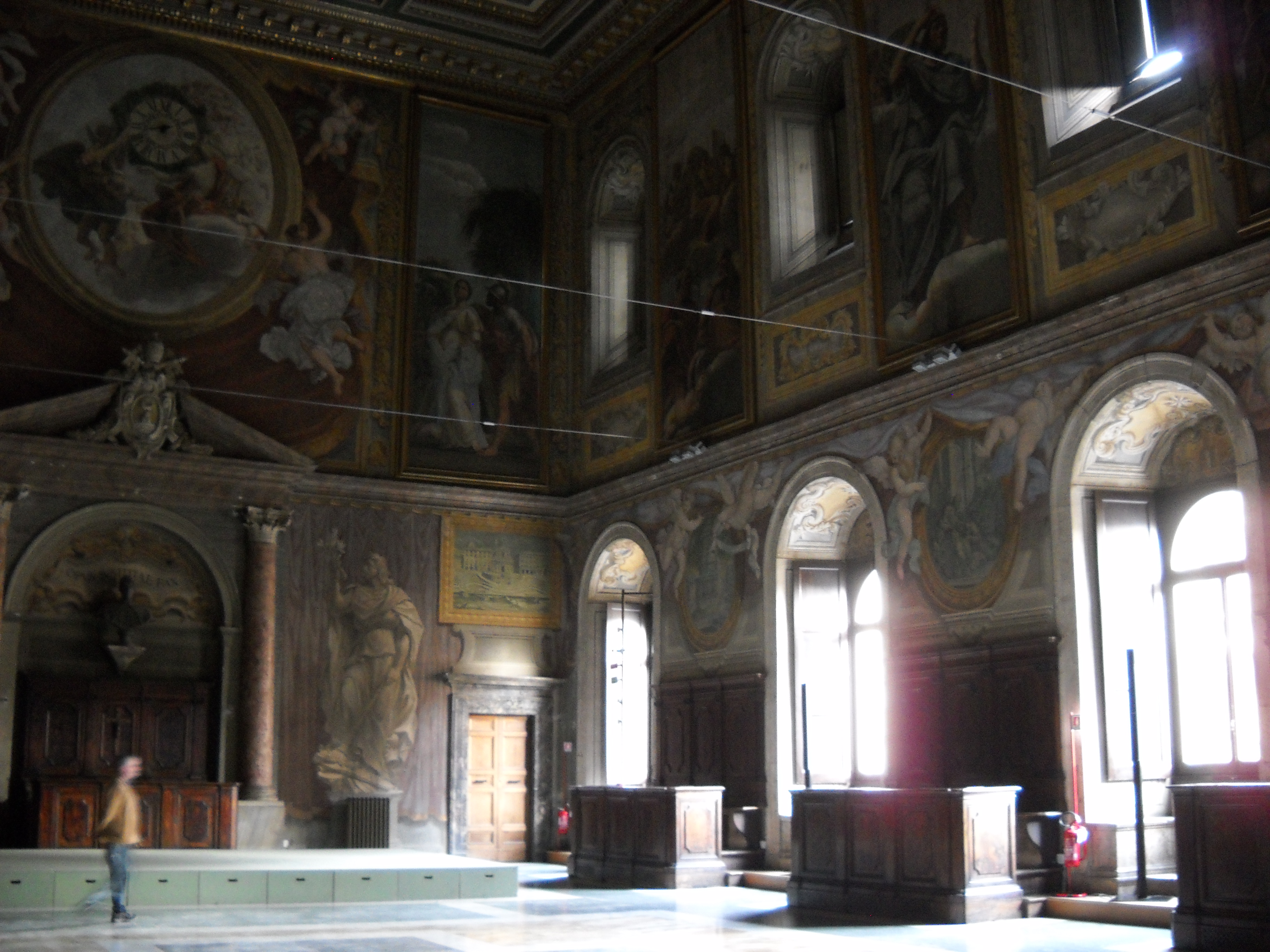
Sala dei Cento Giorni - Giorgio Vasari - 1547 - Palazzo della Cancelleria

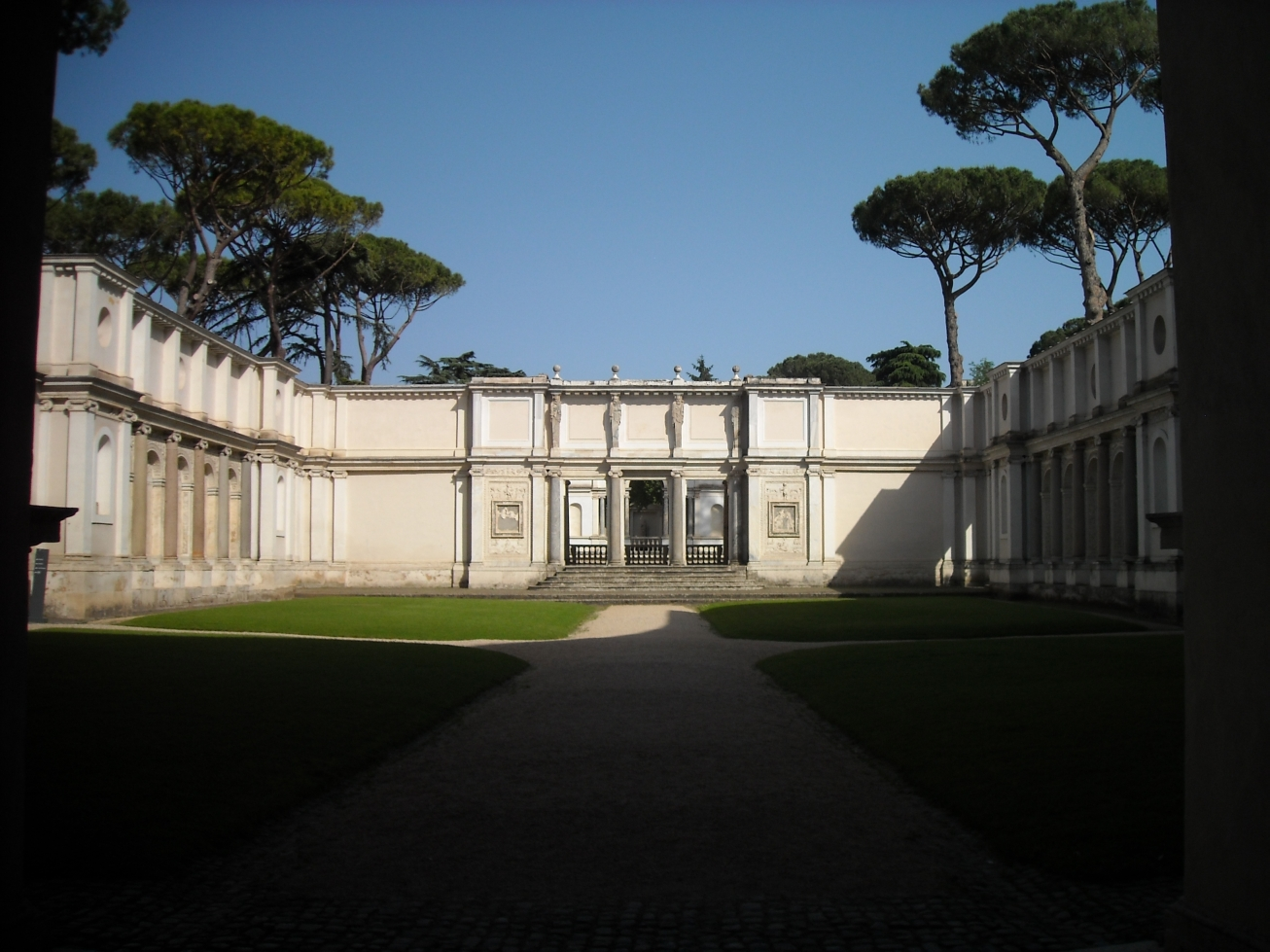
Villa Giulia - Court - Vasari - Vignola

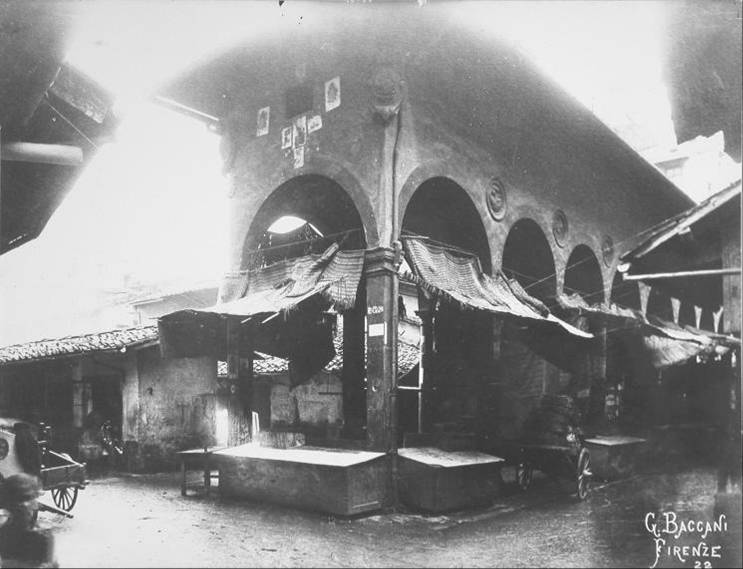
Part of the Loggia del Mercato Vecchio, Florence, just prior to its demolition in the 1880s

== References and sources ==
Sources

- The Lives of the Artists. Oxford University Press, 1998. ISBN 0-19-283410-X
- Lives of the Painters, Sculptors and Architects, Volumes I and II. Everyman's Library, 1996. ISBN 0-679-45101-3
- Vasari on Technique. Dover Publications, 1980. ISBN 0-486-20717-X
- Life of Michelangelo. Alba House, 2003. ISBN 0-8189-0935-8
- Herbermann, Charles, ed. (1912). "Giorgio Vasari" . Catholic Encyclopedia. Vol. 15. New York: Robert Appleton Company.
