= Assisi Diocesan Museum =

Museum in Assisi, Italy

- Museo diocesano e cripta di San Rufino
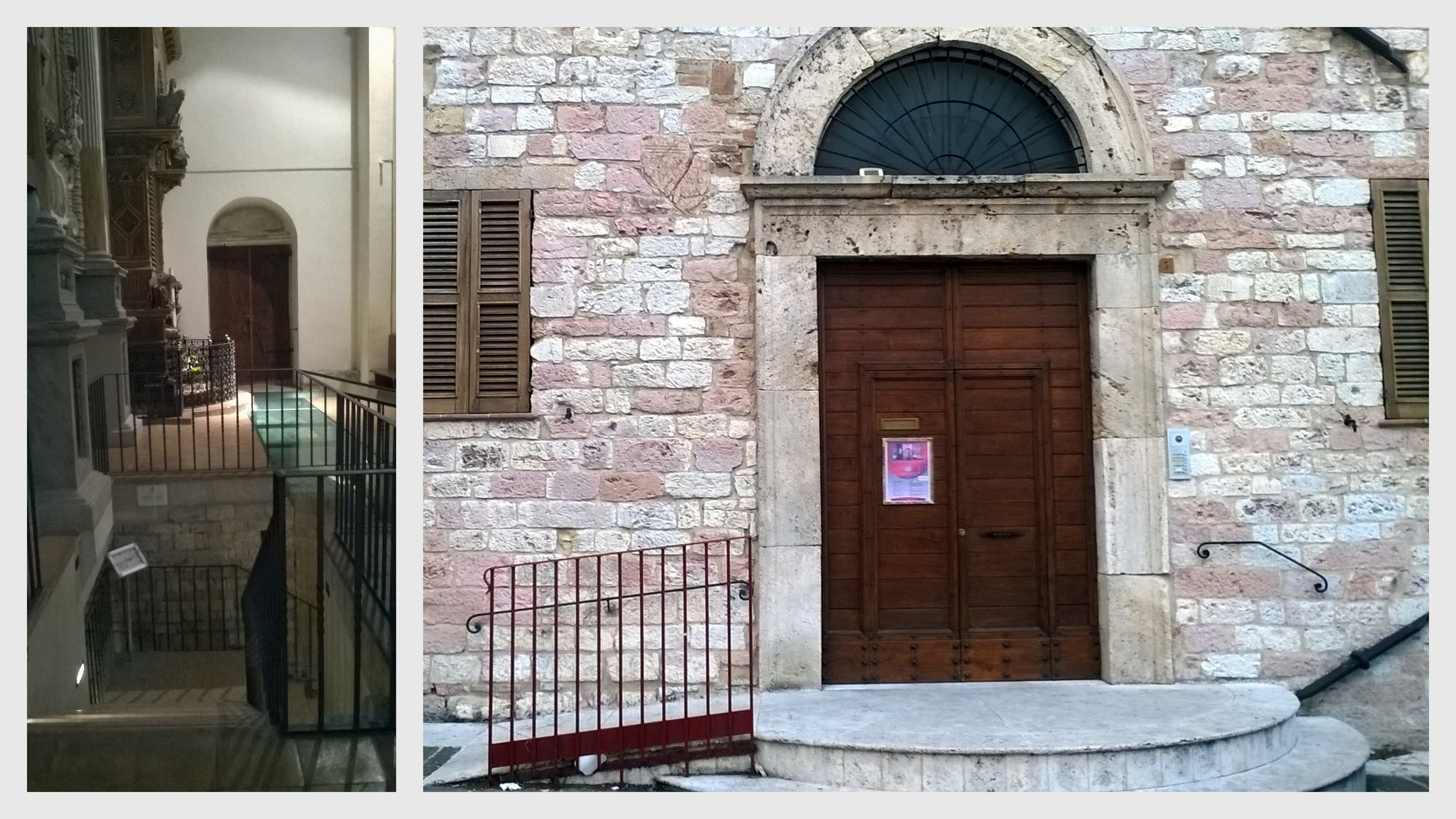
- Entrance to the Assisi diocesan museum and crypt
- Established: 3 September 1941
- Location: Palazzo dei Canonici - Piazza San Rufino, 3, Assisi
- Coordinates: 43.070154°N 12.617807°E
- Type: Diocesan museum, Archeology, Sacred art, Architecture
- Collection size: 300 works
- Founder: Giuseppe Placido Nicolini
- Website: Official Museum Website (in Italian)

The Assisi Diocesan Museum, in the city of Assisi, Italy, was founded in 1941 by bishop Giuseppe Placido Niccolini to preserve the most important works of art of the Assisi Cathedral and of several oratories of Assisi's confraternities. The museum is located underneath the piazza of the cathedral and has a collection consisting of about 300 works of which 100 are on display, exhibited in the museum's nine sections.

== History ==
The museum was founded in 1941, by bishop Giuseppe Placido Nicolini. Its original location was on the ground floor of the parish office, and consisted of four rooms and an annex of historical archives. Entrance was through the cathedral itself and the museum could be visited only by appointment. In the 1990s bishop Sergio Goretti, in addition to encouraging the regular daily opening of the old exhibition spaces, began to consider a reorganization that would be more appropriate for the museum's objects. This gave rise to the project of expanding and refurbishing the museum's space to make it more suitable to the collection.

Following the reconstruction of the earthquake of 1997 and the Jubilee year the spaces underneath the palazzo dei canonici, the cloister, and the crypt were restored. The final exhibition space, now on two floors, was finished and opened to the public on 15 April 2006. The museum now has two entrances, one still found in the cathedral itself (near the chapel of the Holy Eucharist) and a second in the piazza (at the entrance of the palazzo of the canons).

== Exhibition spaces ==
=== Corridor ===
In the corridor are archeological displays of items found in the immediate area, including capitals sculpted in limestone, rediscovered in the crypt but originally from the cathedral, and datable to between the 8th and the 12th centuries. Among the items from the Roman era is the front of the sarcophagus with Nikai Clipeofore and the libation rite dated to the 2nd century.

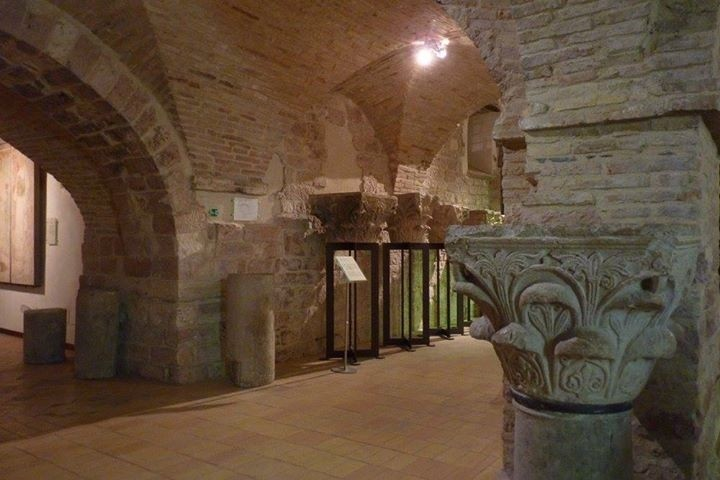
The corridor

=== Master of St. Clare room ===
In the St. Clare room are detached frescoes attributed to the Master of Santa Chiara, an anonymous artist of the 13th century that takes his name from an icon found in the Basilica of St. Clare in Assisi. Originally these frescoes decorated an area above today's chapel of the Madonna del Pianto which corresponds to the old left apse of the cathedral that was separated from the rest of the church with the modifications of Galeazzo Alessi in the 16th century.

=== Nicolò Alunno room ===
This room has the polyptych of San Rufino (1462) by Foligno artist Nicolò di Liberatore (also known as l'Alunno). In the predella are scenes of the martyrdom of San Rufino, the patron of the city of Assisi, including the miraculous finding of his body and its transfer into the walls of the city. Also in this area are two predellas by Dono Doni (1563) as well as sacred vessels and liturgical vestments from the 17th through the 19th centuries.

=== Crypt of San Rufino ===
The Romanesque crypt of San Rufino (11th century) is divided into three naves with an apse and has vaulted arches supported by columns resting on arches. The symbols of the four evangelists are carved into the vaults and are dated to the middle of the 11th century. Inside the crypt is a Roman sarcophagus from the beginning of the third century depicting the myth of Selene and Endimone in which the body of San Rufino was originally placed. Also visible in the crypt is part of a Roman wall in opus quadratum, that was rediscovered underneath the cathedral. The crypt is one of the places that Francis of Assisi went to pray when preaching in the cathedral.

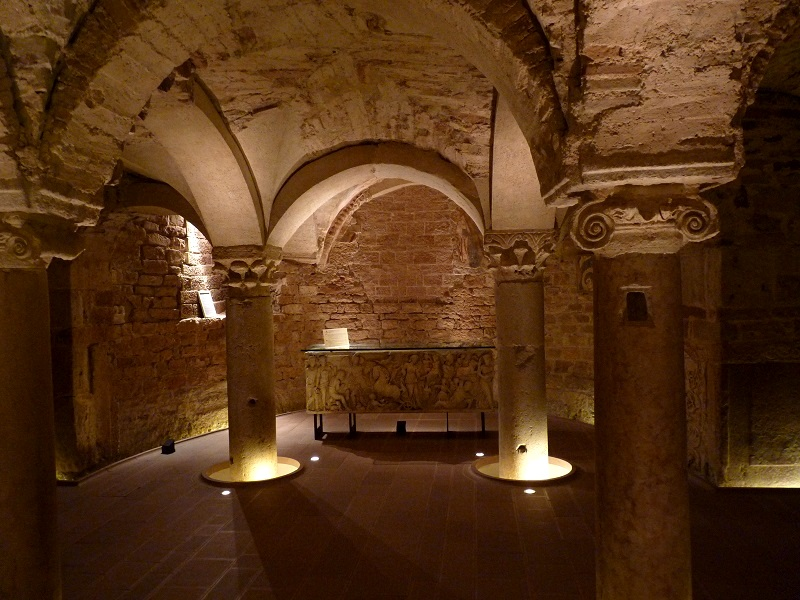
Crypt of San Rufino - 11th century

=== Cloister ===
The cloister (11th century) is surrounded by old portico with arches and capitals, and has at its center a well from the Roman era, known as the pozzo della Mensa.

=== Diocesan room ===
This room houses objects from the churches and monuments of the diocesan territory. Of special interest is the work of Matteo da Gualdo.

=== Confraternity room ===
This room contains objects from the oratories of the confraternities of Assisi and a few processional banners, the oldest of which dates to 1378 and belonged to the Confraternity of St. Francis of the Stigmata. The frescoes in this room recount the story of Christ's passion, and were removed from the oratory of the Confraternity of San Rufinuccio and were painted by Puccio Capanna and Pace di Bartolo. Of particular historical interest is the banner painted by Orazio Riminaldi (1593-1630) for the Confraternity of Santa Caterina that depicts on one side the martyrdom of St. Catherine and on the other side the figures of St. James and St. Anthony the Abbot.

=== Engraved stone tablets ===
This section contains engraved tablets, including gravestones, discovered during the excavations surrounding the cathedral.

=== Sermei room ===
This room was inaugurated in 2014 and contains liturgical objects, silver smithery, and paintings attributed to the Umbrian painter Cesare Sermei. Among the works conserved here is the silver bust reliquary of San Rufino made by Paolo Spagna, and the large, recently restored painting by Sermei of St Francis blessing the city of Assisi at his death.

=== Perkins room ===
This room displays works donated to the Diocese of Assisi by the American art collector Frederick Mason Perkins, who lived for many years in Assisi and died there in 1955. Exhibited are 32 works of Italian artists including: a Madonna attributed to the circle of Francesco di Giorgio Martini, a wooden sculpture attributed by some critics to Jacopo della Quercia, and 14th century Dormitio Virginis attributed to Jacopo Avanzi which was stolen by Nazi soldiers from Perkin's villa in Sassoforte a Lastra a Signa and was recovered by the carabinieri and returned to the museum in 2015.

== Related links ==
- Cathedral of San Rufino
- Rufino of Assisi
- Diocese of Assisi
- Giuseppe Placido Nicolini
