= Bastia Umbra =

- Comune
- Comune di Bastia Umbra
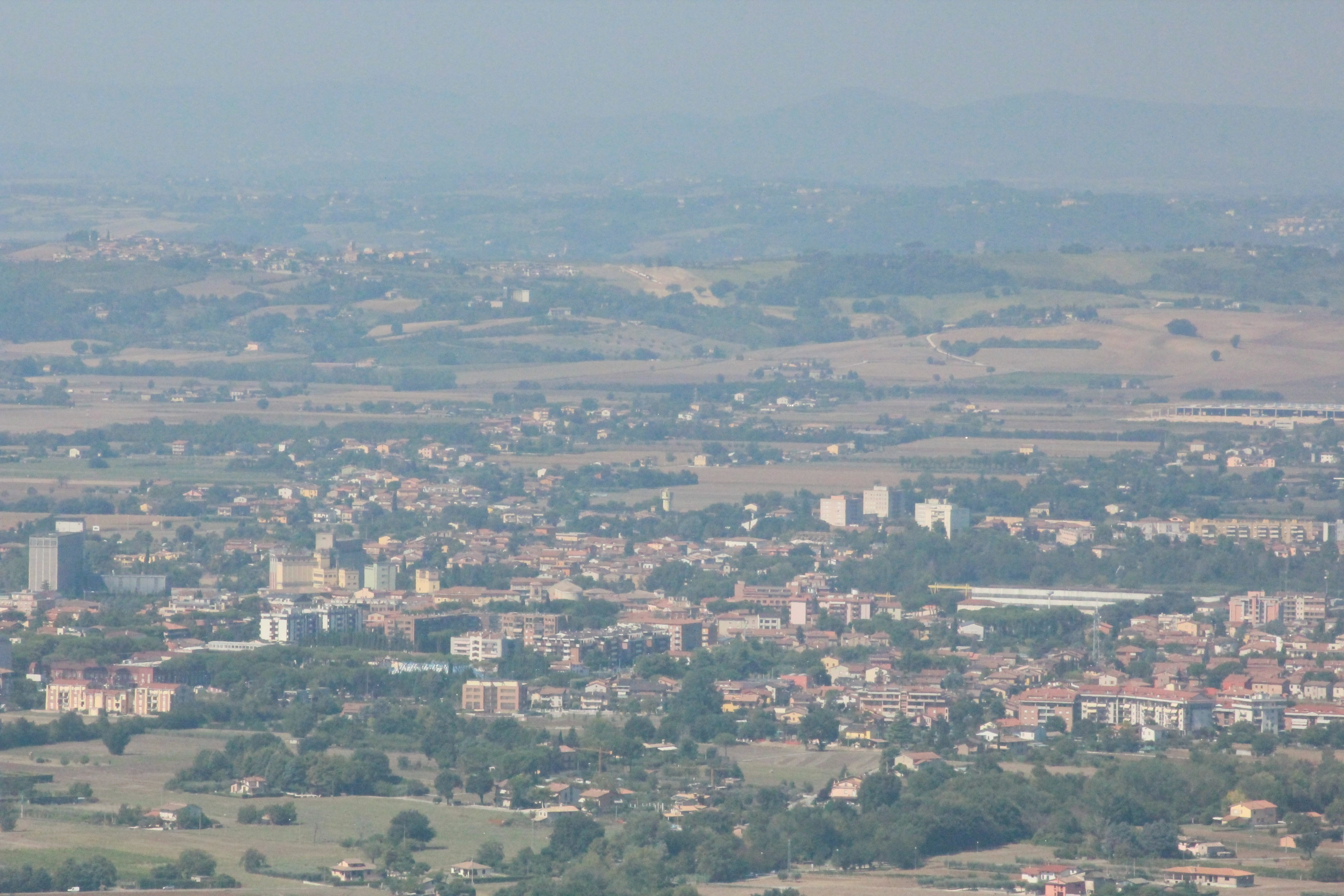
- Panorama of Bastia Umbra

- Coat of arms

- Location within Italy Location within Umbria
- Coordinates: 43.066688°N 12.5489°E
- Country: Italy
- Region: Umbria
- Province: Perugia

Government
  - Mayor: Erigo Pecci

Area
  - Total: 27.62 km^{2} (10.66 sq mi)
- Elevation: 200 m (660 ft)

Population (1 January 2025)
  - Total: 21,321
  - Density: 771.9/km^{2} (1,999/sq mi)
- Demonym: Bastioli
- Time zone: UTC+1 (CET)
  - Summer (DST): UTC+2 (CEST)
- Postal code: 06083
- Dialing code: 075
- Patron saint: St. Michael Archangel
- Saint day: September 29
- Website: Official website

Bastia Umbra (Italian pronunciation: [baˈstiːa ˈumbra]) is a comune (municipality) in the Province of Perugia in the Italian region Umbria.

The town lies 8 miles (13 km) east of Perugia, 1.5 miles (2.4 km) west of the Sanctuary of the Portiuncula, 3 miles (4.8 km) from Assisi, and 12 miles (19 km) from Foligno.

== Etymology ==
Earlier place names for Bastia include Insula Cipi, Insula Vetus, and Insula Romana. These names derived from the presence, in antiquity, of extensive marshes formed by waters descending from the surrounding mountains into the Umbrian Valley and by the stagnation of streams from the Perugia valley, which created the so-called Lacus Perusinus, mentioned by classical authors. The land surrounded by these marshes took on the name of a "Roman island".

In the 14th century the settlement changed its name to Bastia. The name arose when the site was fortified with bastions, some equipped with drawbridges, along with towers and a fortress to the north connected by an underground passage to another strong bastion. The name change is also associated with the later dismantling of these bastions, whose structures were converted into dwellings.

== History ==
At the end of the 5th century two Perugian nobles, Speme and Domizio, obtained permission from Theodoric, king of Italy, to drain the lake that surrounded the area, cutting a channel near Bettona and Torgiano.

Bastia Umbra is first documented in records dating to the 13th century, when it was known by the names Insula Cipi, Insula Vetus, and Insula Romana. By the late 14th century the name Bastia had come into use. During the Middle Ages the settlement was strongly fortified, with drawbridges and a fortress that is still largely preserved. The fortress was surrounded by towers, bastions and ramparts, which were later destroyed.

The town suffered heavily during the wars of the 14th and 15th centuries, both from internal conflicts and from struggles between neighboring cities, especially Perugia and Assisi. Control of Bastia alternated between these powers, and it endured repeated and prolonged sieges, including involvement by the Sforza and papal legates.

The Baglioni family of Perugia held dominion over Bastia several times, at times by popular will and at others by force; Pope Clement VII granted lordship to Malatesta Baglioni. In 1566 Pope Pius V granted it in fief to Astorre and Adriano Baglioni, who governed through a lieutenant.

During the rule of the Baglioni family, the town was governed by a local official appointed by its lords, who swore an oath to uphold the local statutes. Conflicts between the Baglioni and the Papacy led to the demolition of the town's fortifications by papal order. In that same period, as the earlier fortifications declined, habitation expanded toward the east in an area known as the Aggiunta, and Bastia gradually developed into a significant inhabited center.

From 1580 Bastia formed part of the Papal State, a condition that continued until the establishment of the Kingdom of Italy. In 1622 its local statutes were formally codified. During the French period administrative changes were introduced, but the previous system was later restored.

In 1816 Bastia was administered by a vice-governor, dependent on the Delegation of Perugia and the authority of Assisi. The town suffered damage from earthquakes in 1832, 1853, and 1854, which affected several buildings.

Following Italian unification, the town adopted the name Bastia Umbra. In 1895 Bastia had a population of 3,780 inhabitants.

== Geography ==
Bastia is situated in the Umbrian Valley at a modest elevation. It stands in an open plain, with the horizon only limited to the east by Monte Subasio at a distance of 4 miles (6.4 km).

The town lies at an average elevation of 200 metres (660 ft), with its highest point reaching 215 metres (705 ft) and its lowest point at 180 metres (590 ft) above sea level.

The nearby river Chiascio flows through the territory, with waters also feeding canals that run along the western side of the town walls. The surrounding land consists of soils of mixed clay, silica, and limestone composition. Two more watercourses flow through its territory: the Tescio, and the Cagnola, a ditch that flows into the river.

Bastia Umbra borders the following municipalities: Assisi, Bettona, Perugia, and Torgiano.

=== Subdivisions ===
The municipality includes the localities of Bastia Umbra, Boschetti, Case Beretta, Costano, Madonna Campagna, Ospedalicchio, Vicinato, Vicinato le Basse.

In 2021, 670 people lived in rural dispersed dwellings not assigned to any named locality.

At the time, most of the population lived in Bastia Umbra proper (17,552).

== Economy ==
In the 19th century Bastia had a diversified local economy, with numerous trades including blacksmiths, carpenters, basket-makers, shoemakers, coopers, and other artisans. Agriculture was highly productive, with the territory yielding grain, maize, wine, mulberry leaves, hemp, and other crops. Most of the land was cultivated, with only limited wooded areas along the river.

In 1822 the Petrini-Spigadoro enterprise began pasta production, later shifting to animal feed. In 1915 the Franchi mechanical works were founded, initially producing for military purposes and later specializing in metal construction.

After World War II Bastia experienced urban expansion accompanied by growth in manufacturing. Its economic activities expanded to include food preserves, milling, and furniture production. From 1969 the town has hosted trade fairs and livestock exhibitions, including Agriumbria and an agricultural machinery show. During the 1970s and 1980s the shop fitting sector expanded significantly.

== Demographics ==
The population of Bastia recorded a steady and sustained pattern of growth over time. In 1861, the population stood at 3,389 inhabitants and increased gradually in the following decades, reaching 4,473 by 1901. This upward trend continued into the early 20th century, with the population rising to 5,053 in 1921 and 5,684 by 1936.

Growth accelerated significantly in the post-war period. From 7,040 inhabitants in 1951, Bastia expanded rapidly to 11,782 in 1971. The upward trajectory continued through the late 20th century, with the population reaching 16,244 in 1991. Unlike many municipalities in Umbria, Bastia maintained consistent growth.

This long-term increase has extended into the 21st century, with the population reaching 21,321 inhabitants by 2025.

== Religion and culture ==
=== Santa Croce ===
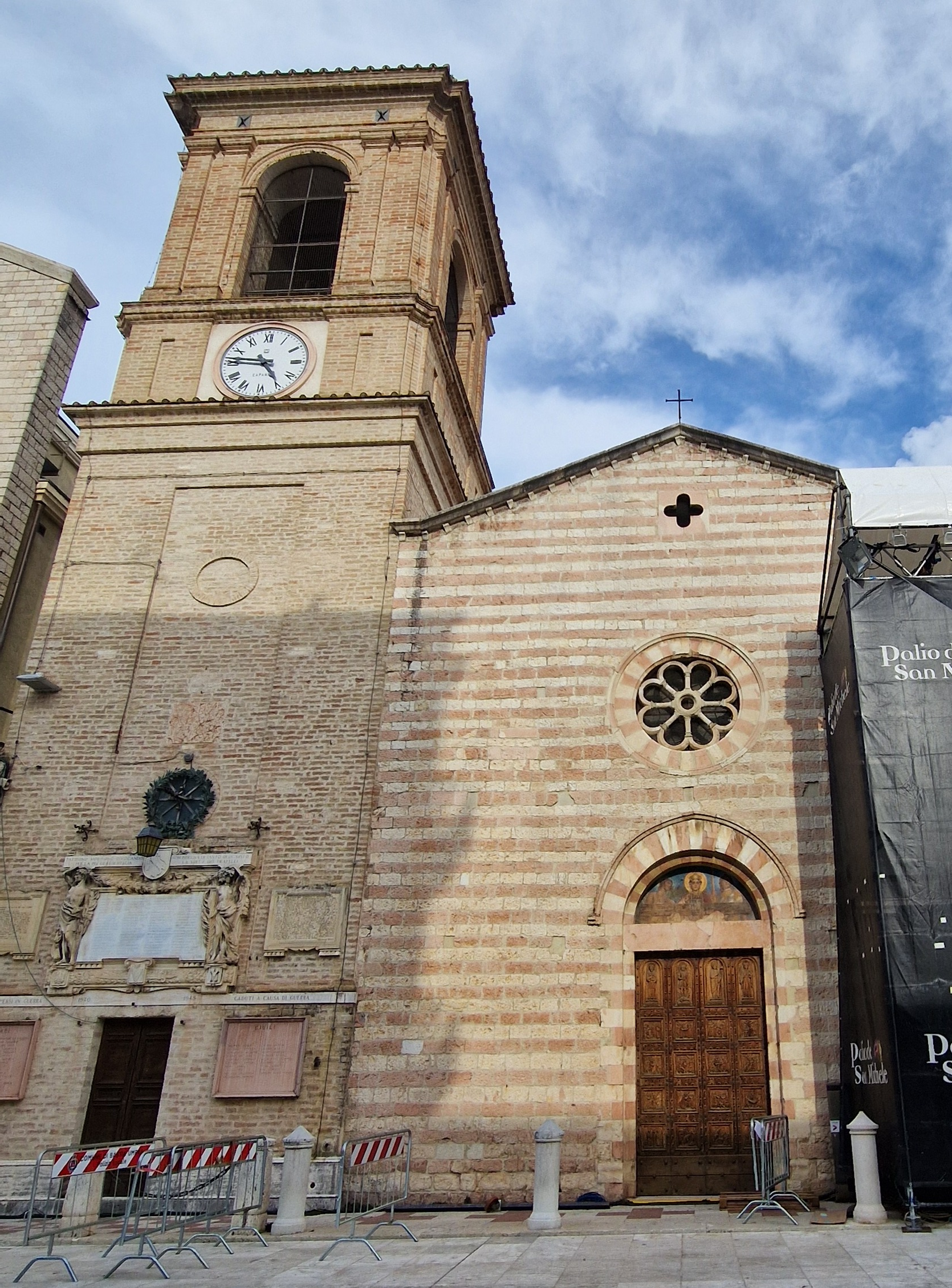
Church of Santa Croce

The collegiate church of Santa Croce was built in 1295 together with a convent by the Franciscan order. The convent hosted for a time Conrad of Offida, who died in Bastia in 1306. The Franciscans left the complex in 1653 following papal measures suppressing smaller convents. In 1788 the church became a collegiate and parish church, a role transferred in 1962 to San Michele Arcangelo.

The façade is faced in bichrome stone from Mount Subasio, with a gabled roof, central rose window and a portal with a lunette painted by Domenico Bruschi in 1886. The single-nave interior preserves numerous works, including the Polyptych of Saint Angelo (1499) by Niccolò Alunno, a Madonna with Child and angels of Umbrian-Tuscan school, a Madonna with Child and Saint Luke (1510) by Tiberio d'Assisi, and a cycle on the miracles of Saint Anthony Abbot by Cesare Sermei. The decorative scheme of the nave, chapels, presbytery and apse was also executed by Bruschi in 1886, while the stained glass windows (1903 and 1923) are by the Moretti-Caselli family.

The bell tower, built between 1835 and 1839, was later reduced in height following damage from the 1854 earthquake. The church underwent extensive restoration after the 1997 earthquake and reopened for worship in 2012.

=== San Paolo delle Abbadesse ===
The church of San Paolo delle Abbadesse stands outside the built-up area, and is today annexed to the municipal cemetery. The building dates to between the 11th and 12th century and was associated with a Benedictine nunnery. In 1212, at the request of Francis of Assisi, it hosted Clare of Assisi for several weeks to protect her from attempts by her family to force her return home.

The Romanesque church has a gabled façade with a single portal surmounted by a narrow window and a bell gable. The semicircular apse is externally decorated with semi-columns, corbels and small arches, and features a bifora surmounted by a relief of two doves. The interior consists of a single nave with exposed wooden roof trusses. In the apse are fragments of frescoes of the Perugian school depicting the Madonna with Child alongside Saint Paul and Saint Benedict. Traces of blocked doorways remain on the walls, possibly once connecting the church to the monastery, which was destroyed in 1389.

=== San Rocco ===
Located outside the walls near Porta Romana, the church of San Rocco was enlarged in the 17th century during a time of plague. The church contains a notable painted banner depicting the Virgin in glory with Saint Sebastian, Saint Rocco and Christ in Limbo, attributed to Dono Doni. The statue of Saint Rocco on the main altar dates to the 16th century.

=== San Michele Arcangelo ===
The current parish church of San Michele Arcangelo stands on the site of two earlier churches, one dedicated to Saint Anthony Abbot and the other to the Buona Morte. The present building was designed by the architect Antonio Bindelli. It was consecrated in 1962. In the baptistery are works by Vincenzo Rosignoli depicting the Madonna Addolorata and Christ crucified.

=== Other religious buildings ===
The church of Sant'Anna is attached to a Benedictine monastery founded in 1602 within part of the former fortress. The complex includes living quarters, a garden, and a walkway along the battlements. The church contains frescoes attributed to Appiani and other painters.

The church of the Confraternity of Sant'Antonio Abate contains three altars and an organ. The main altar features a painting by Cesare Sermei, along with other works associated with the school of Dono Doni.

The church of Santa Lucia preserves a Roman funerary inscription and, on the right side, a holy water stoup in carved stone dating to the 14th century.

The former parish church of Sant'Angelo, already partly in ruins in the 19th century, contains deteriorated frescoes attributed to the school of Perugino. It was no longer in use.

=== Secular buildings ===
The town includes a large municipal palace housing administrative offices and public institutions. A theatre, built around 1829, featured multiple tiers of boxes and hosted performances by local and visiting companies.

== Notable people ==
Among the people originating from Bastia Umbra in the arts are the composer Mariano Bartolucci and businessman Pino Lancetti. Also associated with cultural life is Federico Lancetti.

In the religious sphere, the Catholic bishop and theologian Gualtiero Sigismondi, the bishop Marcello Bartolucci, and the monk Vitale d'Assisi are among those originating from the area.

The patriot Colomba Antonietti, the trade unionist Serafino Romualdi, and the condottiero Girolamo Gambara represent its contribution to political and military life.

Among figures in media is the disc jockey Antonio Ferrari.

In sport, Bastia Umbra is the place of origin of the footballers Claudio Tinaglia and Filippo Furiani, as well as the football managers Armando Serlupini and Leonardo Acori, and the referee Vittorio Benedetti.

Among the prominent families mentioned in the 19th century is the Bianchini family of Costano, noted for their trade in livestock and commercial connections beyond the region.

== Twin towns ==
- Höchberg, Germany
- Sant Sadurní d'Anoia, Spain
- Luz-Saint-Sauveur, France
