= Santa Maria Maggiore, Assisi =

Church in Assisi, Italy

Coordinates: 43.0696°N 12.6145°E

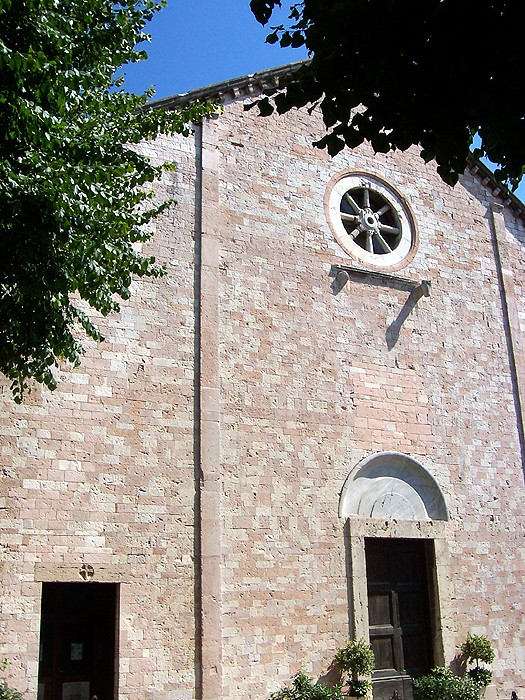
Frontage of Santa Maria Maggiore

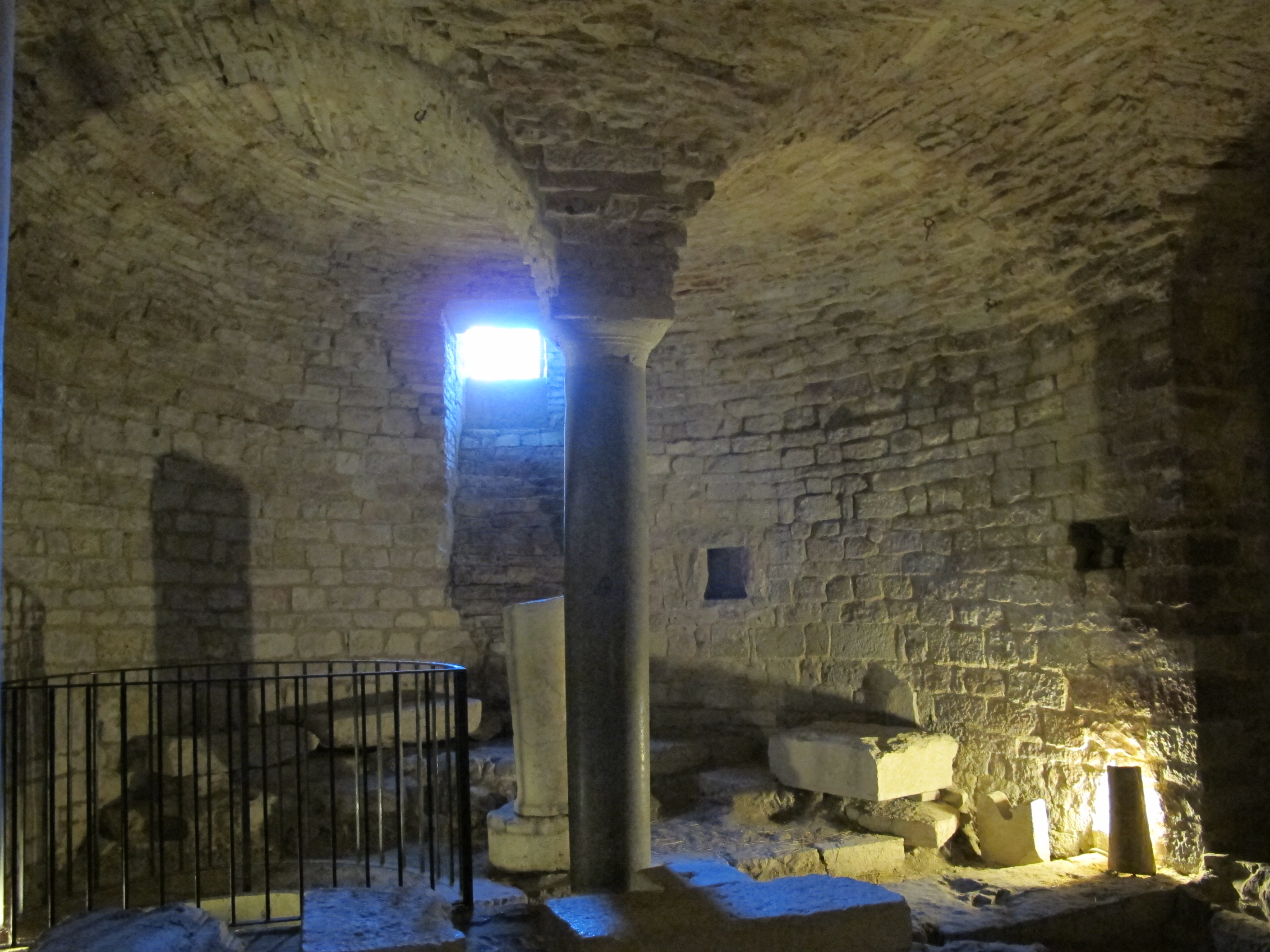
View of the crypt

The Church of Santa Maria Maggiore (Italian: Chiesa di Santa Maria Maggiore), also known as the Sanctuary of the Spoliation (Italian: Santuario della Spogliazione), is a Catholic church in Assisi, Umbria, central Italy.

== History ==
The current structure dates from the 11th-12th centuries, although it was built on a pre-existing Early Christian church; the latter had been in turn erected above a Roman edifice, the so-called "Propertius' domus" or a temple dedicated to Apollo or, according to the tradition, to Janus. The church served as the city's cathedral until 1036, when the title was moved to the current cathedral, the church of San Rufino.

In 2019, the body of Carlo Acutis was brought to the Sanctuary of the Spoliation and venerated at its final resting place. Overnight, the procession stopped at the Cathedral of San Rufino and the diocesan choir sang a Non io, ma Dio, ("Not me, but God"), a hymn especially composed for the occasion by Marco Mammoli. While Acutis's body may appear incorrupt behind the view glass, it is actually encased in a wax layer that was molded to look like his body prior to burial—this practice is common for the presentation of saints' bodies so that pilgrims can see the saints as they were when they died. The church expected two million visitors to Acutis's tomb in 2025.

== Description ==
The church has an undecorated façade divided vertically by pilasters. The entrance door is surmounted by an ogival arch and a rose window, dated 1163 and signed by one Johannes, identified by some with Giovanni da Gubbio, the architect of the present Assisi Cathedral. The bell tower, built in the 14th century, is in Gothic-Romanesque style.

The interior has a basilica plan with a nave and two aisles, separated by pillars. The walls house fresco remains and paintings of the 14th-15th centuries, including a Pietà attributed to Tiberio d'Assisi and works by Pace di Bartolo. It is likely that the walls were entirely frescoed originally. There is also a panel of the Madonna with Child from Pinturicchio's school.

The crypt, belonging to the 10th-century church, is home to Roman architectural elements, such as decorated walls, pavements, capitals from the preceding Roman building, and a sarcophagus with a sculpted cross, dating from the 9th century. From the annexed garden, remains of the ancient city's walls can be seen.

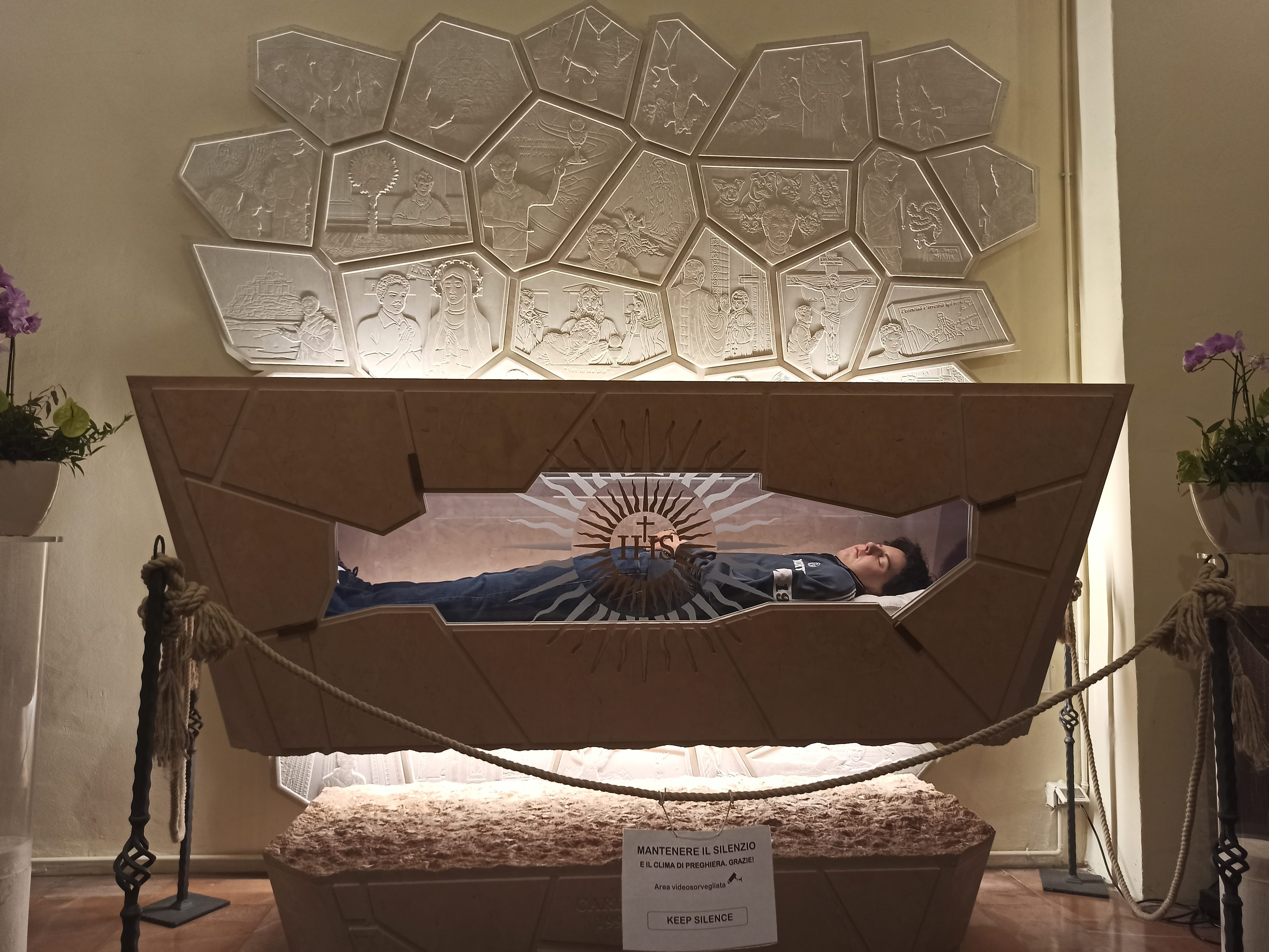
Tomb of Carlo Acutis

Since 2019 the church has held the relics of Saint Carlo Acutis, making it a site of pilgrimage for many of the Catholic faithful.

== Sources ==
- Conquer, Will (2021). Carlo Acutis: A Millennial in Paradise. Sophia Institute Press. ISBN 9781644134849.
- Troiano, G.; A. Pompei. Guida illustrata di Assisi. Terni: Casa Editrice Francescana.
- Santini, L. Assisi. Narni-Terni: Plurigraf.
