= Frederick Mason Perkins =

American art historian

Frederick Mason Perkins (1874 in Plymouth, Massachusetts – October 12, 1955 in Assisi) was an American art historian, critic, and collector.

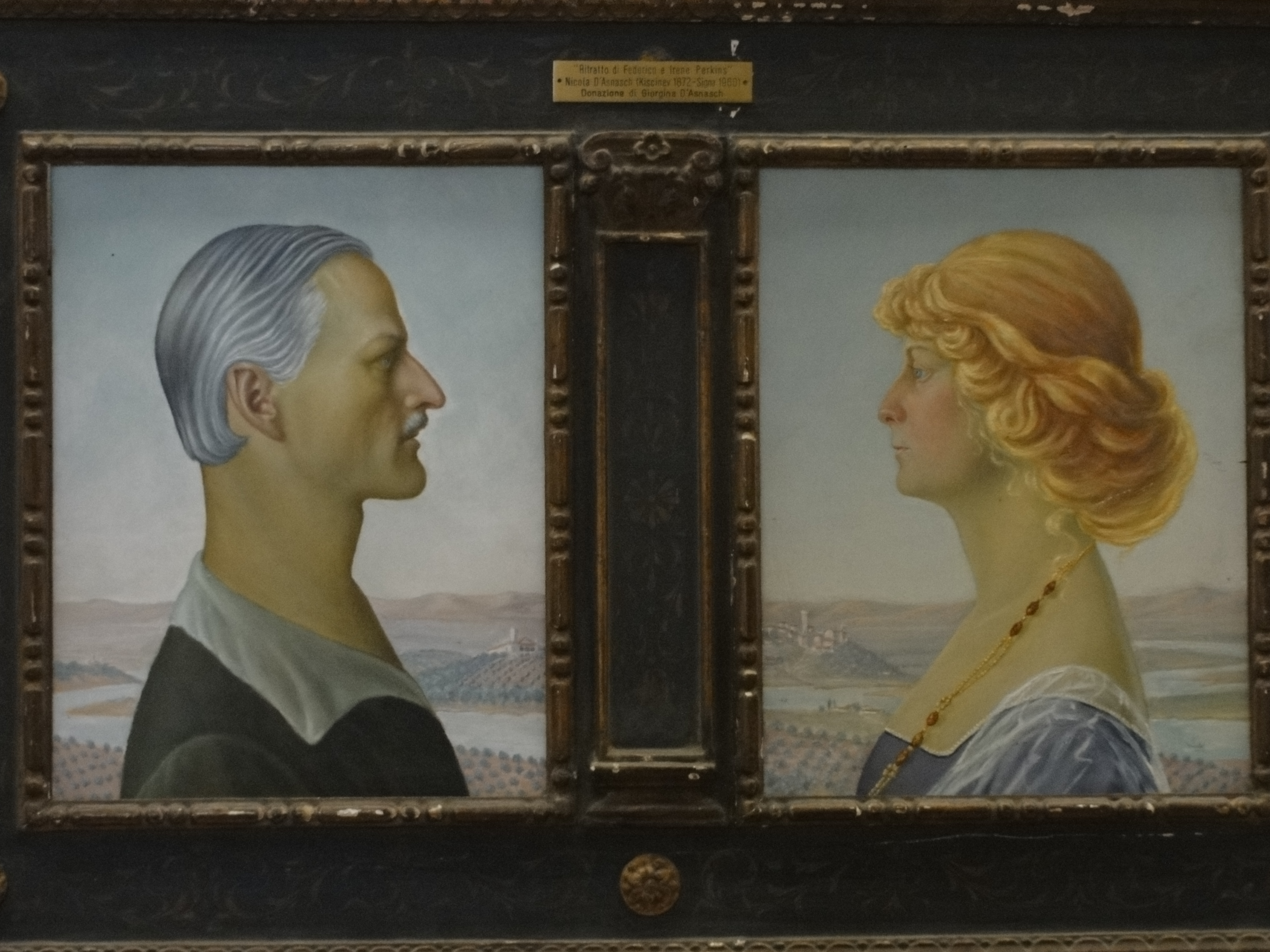
Frederick Mason Perkins and Irene Perkins by Nicholas D'Asnasch, 1955

== Biography ==
Frederick Mason Perkins was born in Plymouth, Massachusetts and grew up in China, where his parents, Americans of English origin, were missionaries. Although they were Protestant, Perkins was educated by Jesuits.

When he was young, Perkins studied piano with Theodor Leschetizky in Vienna, then later at Leipzig University of Dresden University. In 1898 he met art historian Bernard Berenson and became his student. From the time Perkins was young he had an interest in Italian art history and in particular for works produced in Tuscany and Umbria in the 14th and 15th centuries. Throughout his life he not only studied these works but also produced catalogs and research about them. He collaborated with specialist art magazines, for example Rassegna d'Arte (founded in 1901) and La Diana, where he published some of his research.

He became an art dealer and well known expert, maintaining in his houses in Florence (Lastra a Signa near Sassoforte) and Assisi (in the Piazza del Vescovado) one of the most important private collections of Italian art, which included works by Duccio di Boninsegna, Pietro Lorenzetti, Lorenzo Monaco, Jacopo della Quercia, Gentile da Fabriano, il Sassetta, Sano di Pietro, and Filippo Lippi among others. Perkins's expertise helped both Dan Fellows Platt and George Blumenthal develop their own personal art collections.

Perkins married Lucy Olcott in 1900 but the union did not last long. In 1913 he married again, to Irene Vavasour Elder, and this marriage lasted until his death.

During World War II, Perkins and his wife were interned in Perugia. Perkins's works of art in Assisi were sequestered and only returned to him after the end of the German occupation of Assisi in October 1944. After the war, Perkins moved to Assisi (before 1947) taking his collection with him. Later, he decided to donate fifty-seven of the works in his collection to the Conventual Franciscasn Friars at the Basilica of Saint Francis in Assisi, and today these works can be seen in the Basilica's Treasure Museum. Other works from his collection became part of the collections of the Galleria Nazionale dell'Umbria and the Diocese of Assisi. In 2004, Sergio Goretti, bishop of Assisi, assigned the 33 works donated to the Diocese, including numerous paintings, a wooden statue, and some drawings (the latter not presently on exhibition) to the Diocesan Museum and Crypt of St. Rufino.

Perkins died in Assisi on October 12, 1955 and is buried in the Assisi cemetery. His photo archive, counting 8,000 objects, is housed at I Tatti's Berenson Library.

== Selected works in the Perkins Collection ==
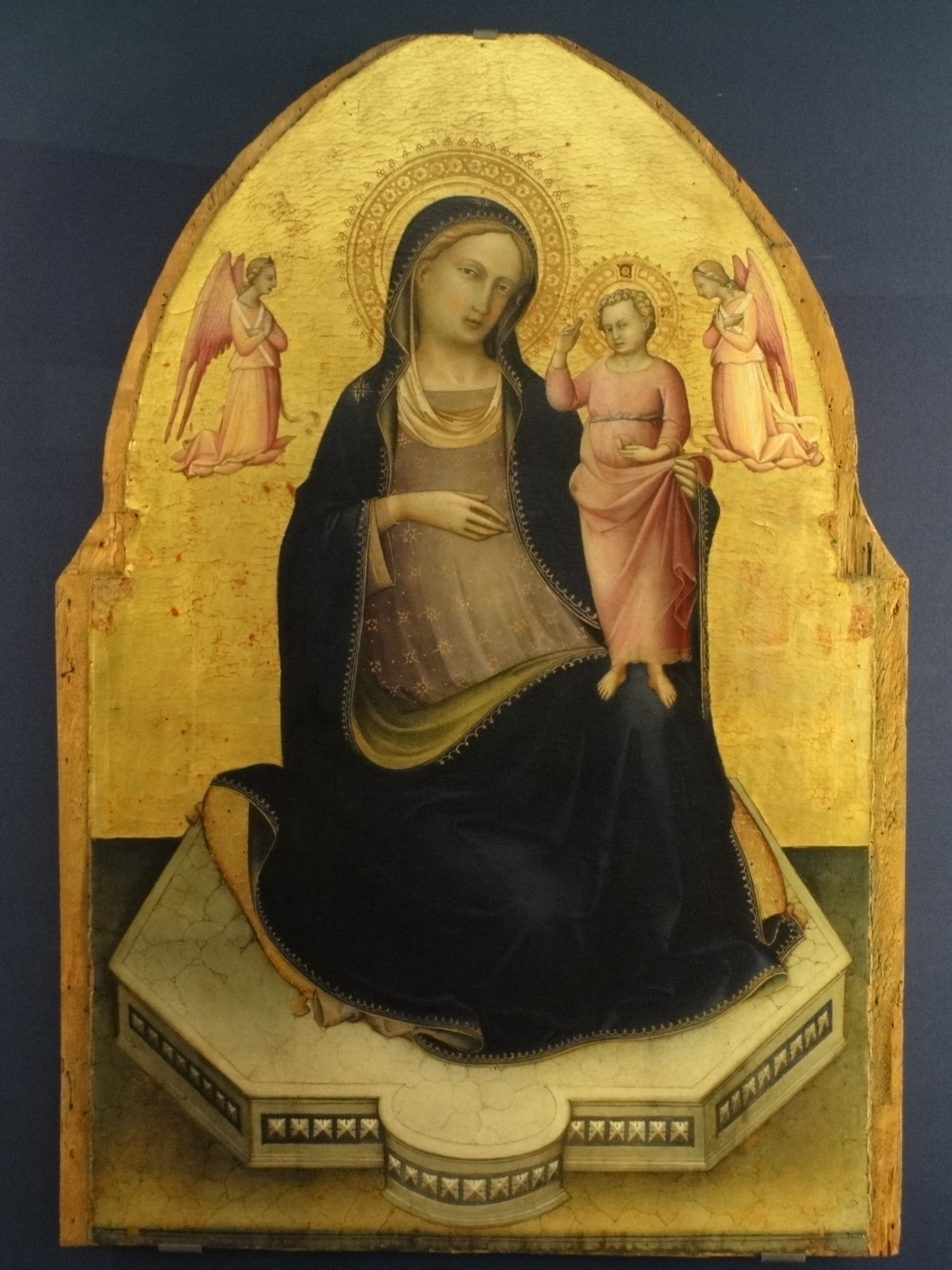
Madonna of Humility, by Lorenzo Monaco, Siena, 1370-1425, Treasure Museum, Assisi

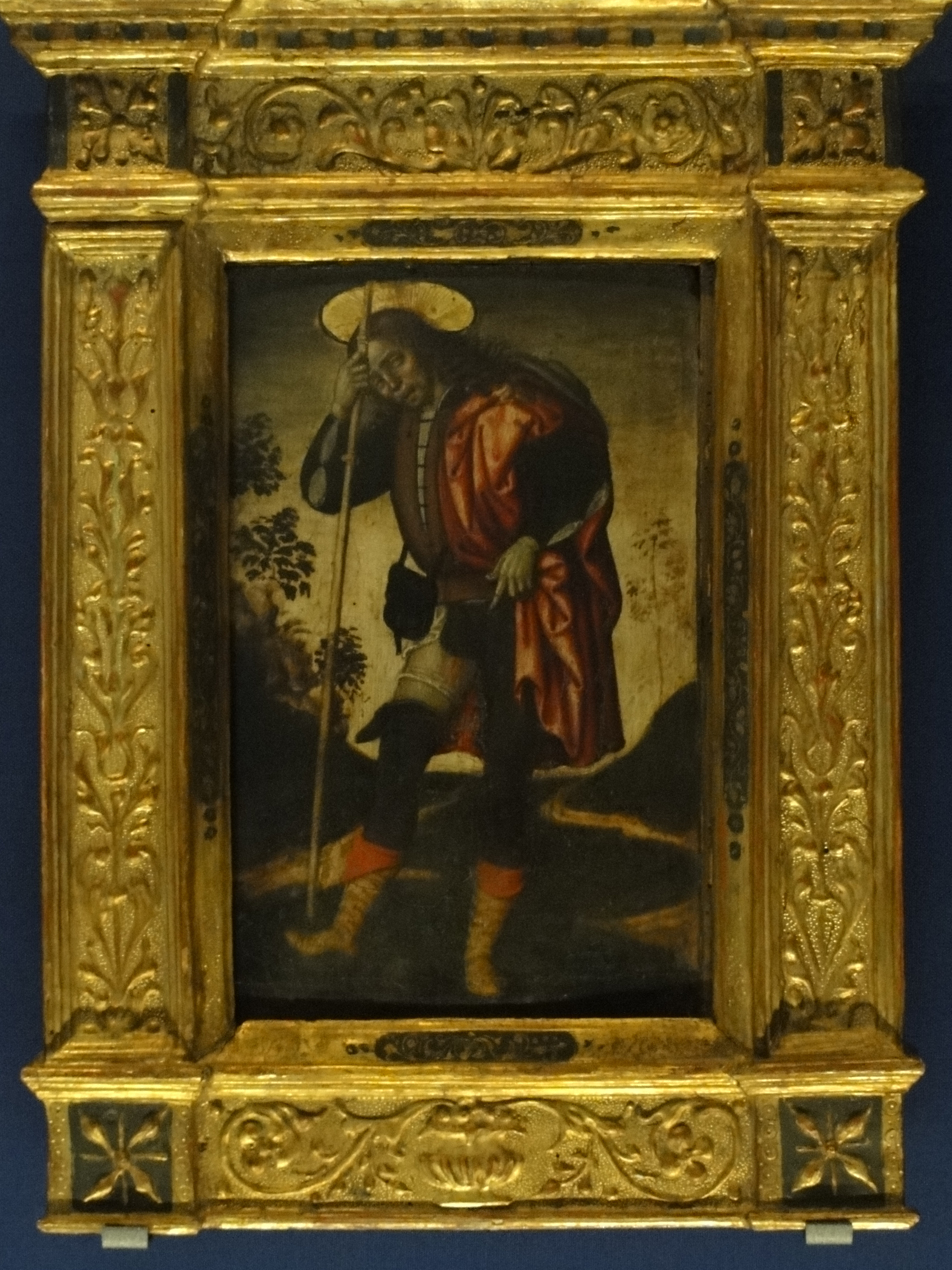
St. Rocco, by Niccolo Alunno, Foligno, 1430-1502, Treasure Museum, Assisi

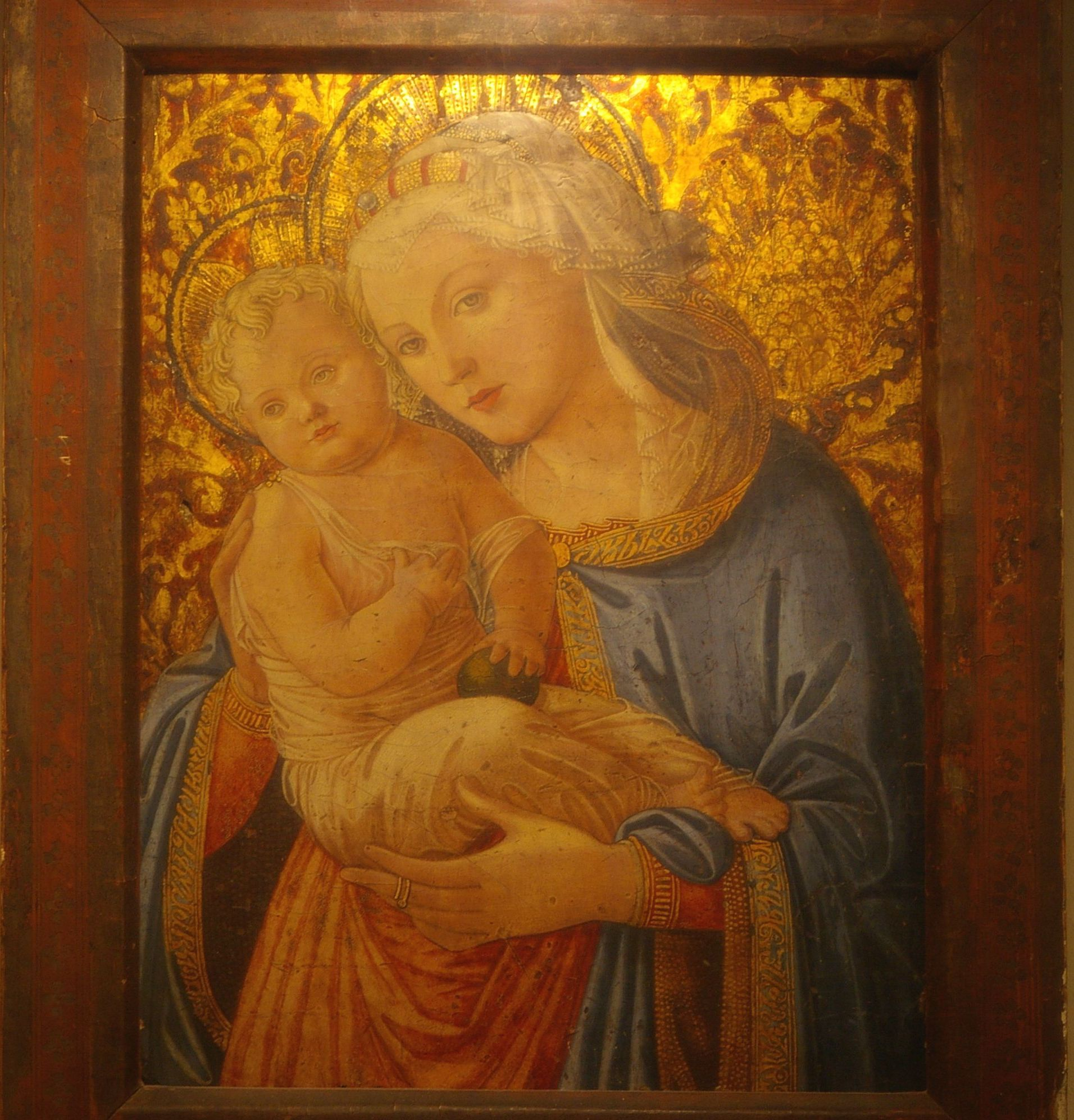
Madonna with Child, school of Filippo Lippi, 16th century, Museo del Duomo, Assisi

== Related links ==
- Bernard Berenson
- Treasure Museum of the Basilica of St Francis
- Assisi Cathedral
