= Capanna =

Capanna is an Italian surname. Notable people with the surname include:

- Mario Capanna (born 1945), Italian politician and writer
- Puccio Capanna (fl. 14th-century), Italian painter
