= Assisi Cathedral =

Church in Assisi, Italy

Coordinates: 43°04′13″N 12°37′03″E

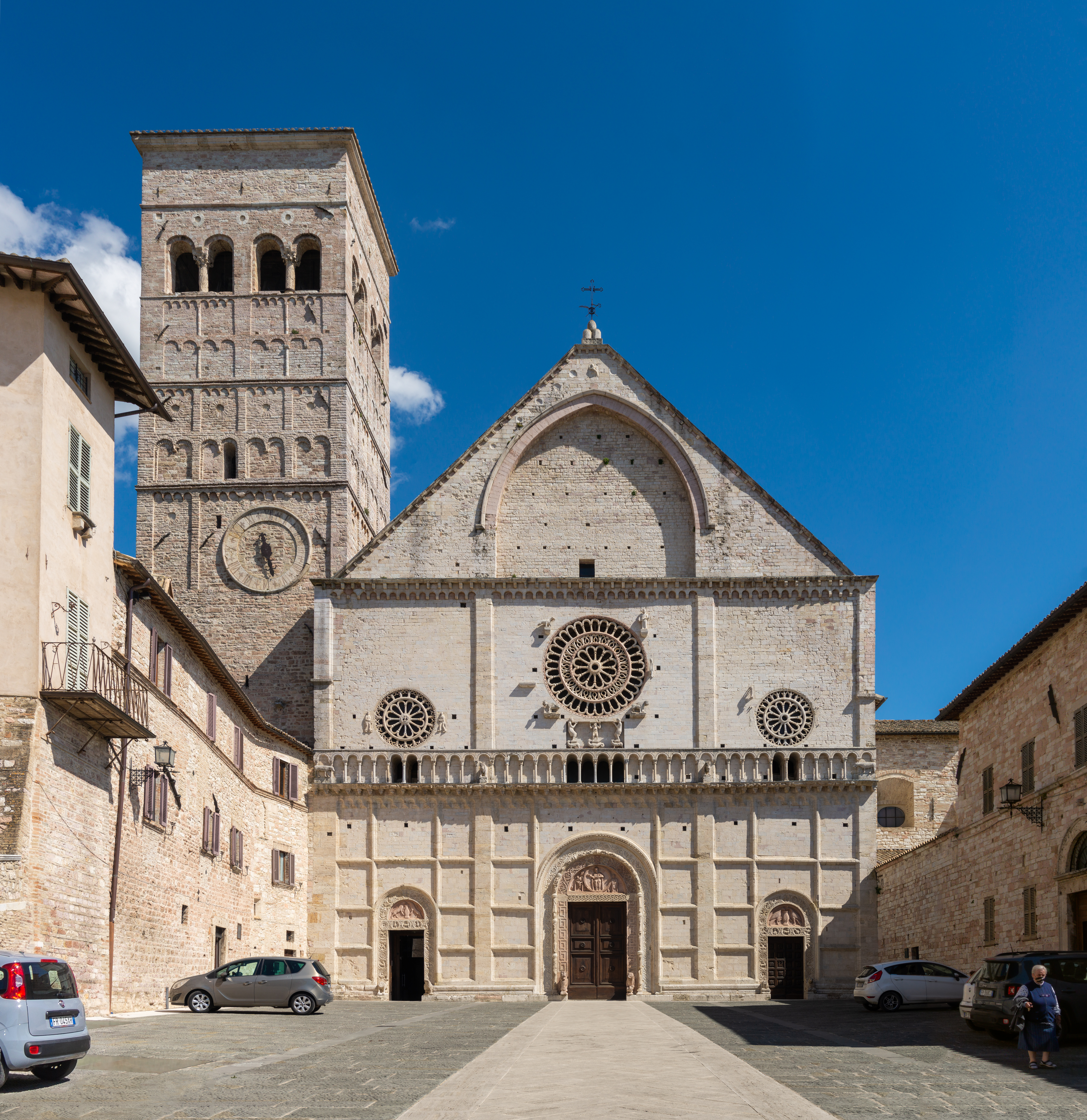
Assisi Cathedral.

Assisi Cathedral (Italian: Cattedrale di San Rufino di Assisi, or simply Cattedrale di Assisi), dedicated to Saint Rufinus, is a major church in Assisi, Italy. This imposing cathedral, built in the Romanesque style of Umbria, is the third church constructed on the same site to house the relics of Bishop Rufinus, who was martyred in the 3rd century.

== History ==
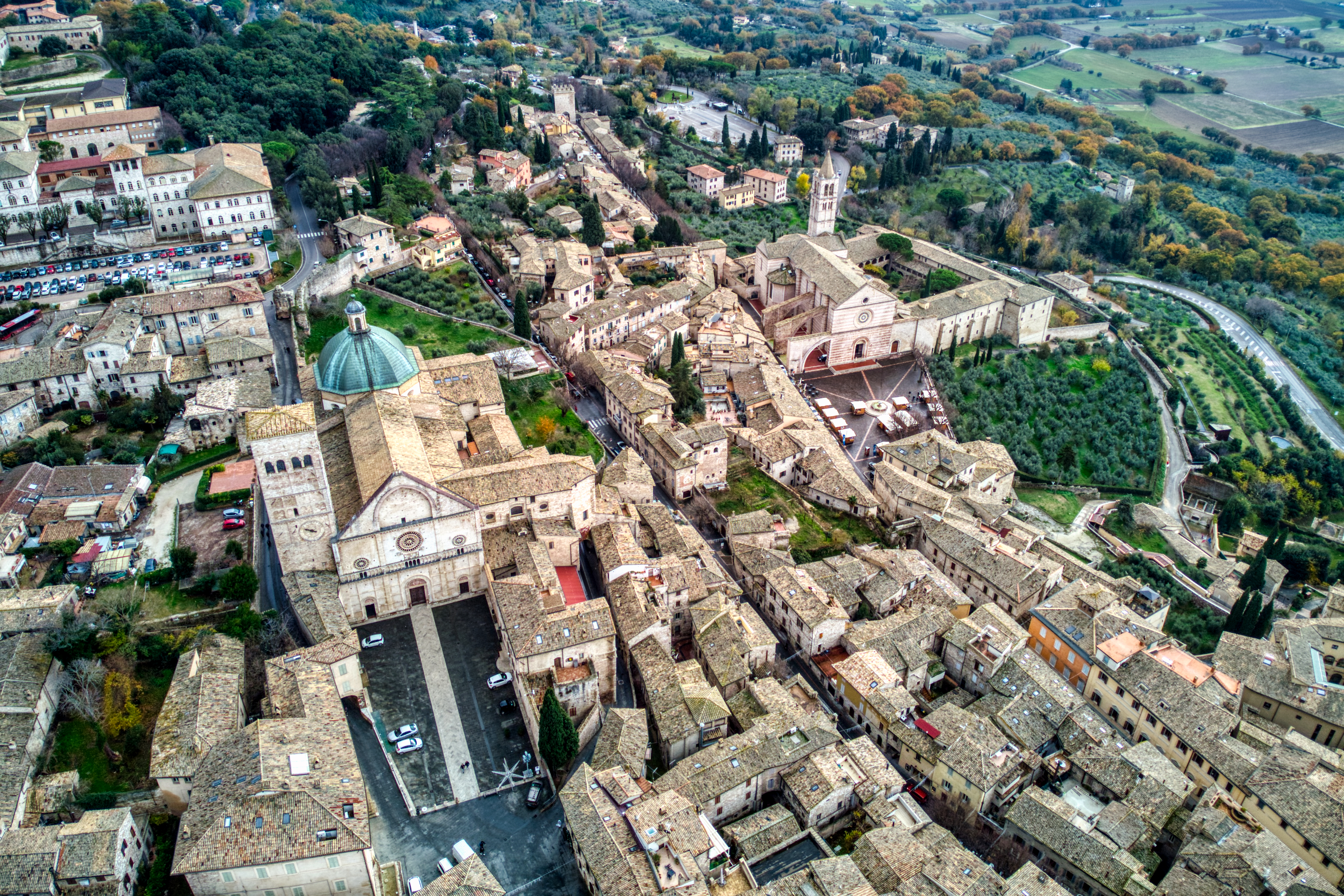
The vicinity of the Assisi Cathedral in Assisi, just above the Basilica di Santa Chiara.

Construction began in 1140 based on designs by Giovanni da Gubbio, as recorded by a wall inscription still visible inside the apse. He may be the same Giovanni who later designed the rose window of Santa Maria Maggiore in 1163.

The cathedral has played an important role in the history of the Franciscan Order. Within its walls, Saint Francis of Assisi (1182), Saint Clare (1193), many of their early followers, and even Emperor Frederick II were baptized.

It was after hearing Francis preach in this church in 1209 that Clare was deeply moved by his message and came to recognize her vocation. According to Tommaso da Celano, Saint Francis was once seen praying in this church while simultaneously appearing in a vision, riding a chariot of fire, at the Porziuncola.

In 1228, during his visit to Assisi for the canonization of Saint Francis, Pope Gregory IX consecrated the cathedral's high altar. The completed church was later inaugurated by Pope Innocent IV in 1253.

Since 1986, it has served as a co-cathedral of the Roman Catholic Diocese of Assisi-Nocera Umbra-Gualdo Tadino.

== Façade ==
The Romanesque façade was built with stones from the Monte Subasio. It is a typical example of the style found in 12th-century churches of Umbria. This façade is divided in three sections. The rather bare top level is triangular with an empty semi-circular arch in the middle, probably intended to contain a frieze or a mosaic.

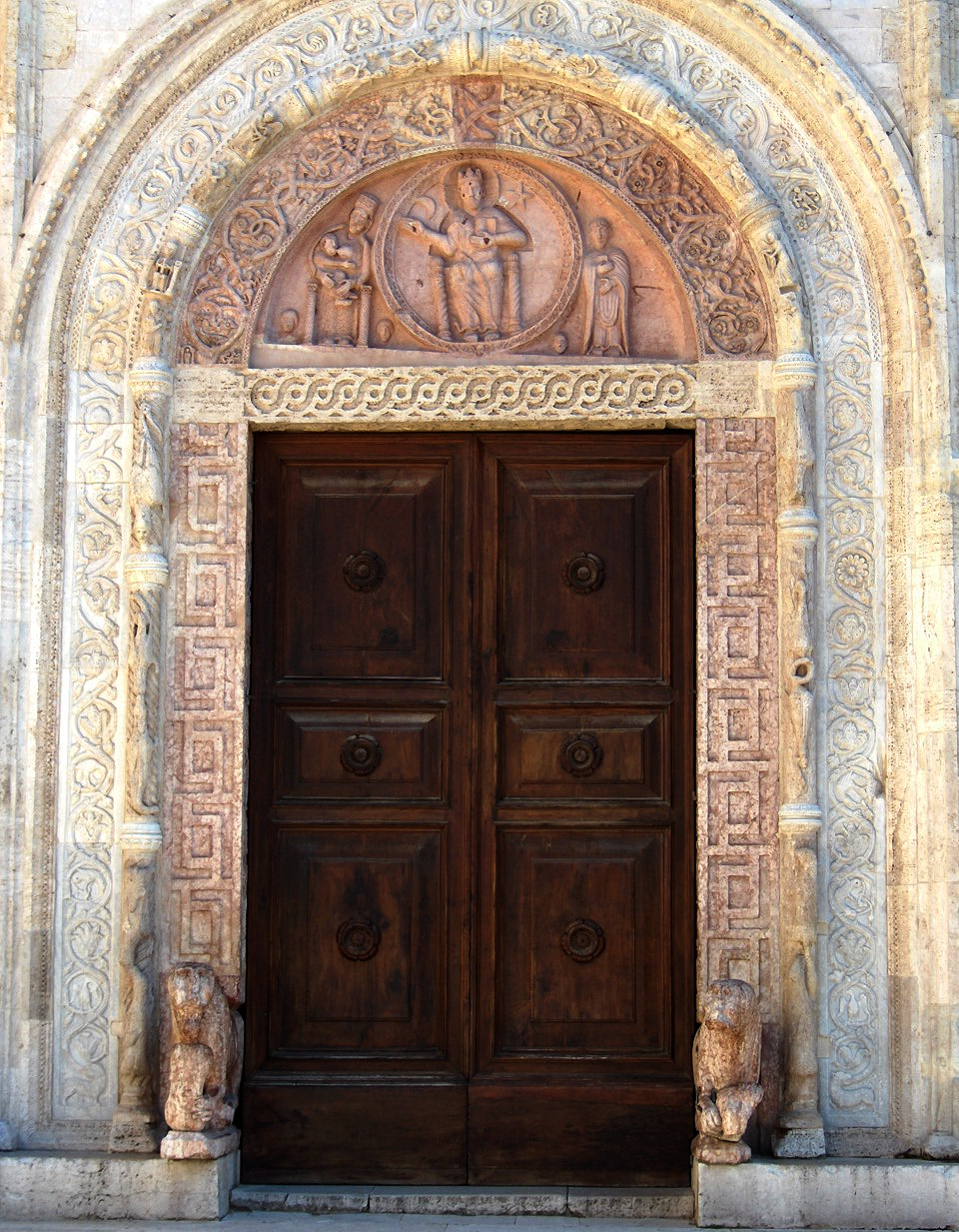
Central portal

The middle level is divided by two pilasters, in line with the arch in the upper level. Each of the bay thus delineated contains a rose window, the central one the largest and the most ornate. Its frame is supported by three telamones, each standing on an animal. In the four spandrels around the rose window are the four animal symbols of the four evangelists.

The lower level consists of a number of squares and three decorated stone portals with griffins at the base of the side portals. Especially the middle portal is extensively decorated. In the lunette of the semi-circular arch over the central portal is a relief with the Christ enthroned between the sun and the moon and flanked by the Virgin, also enthroned and nursing Jesus, and St. Rufinus. The portal is surrounded with three arches decorated with saints, floral and geometrical motifs and intertwined swans. At the base of the middle arch, on each side, is a lion. These sculptures of lions and griffins have great iconographic importance.

The bottom and the middle part of the square bell tower, on the left side of the façade, were built in the 11th century. It was then situated behind the apse of the previous church built by bishop Ugone in 1029. The top level dates from the 13th century. One can see on the bell tower a colossal one-handed liturgical clock showing the 24 hours of the hora italica (Italian time), a period of time ending with sunset at 24 hours. The foundations of the bell tower rest on a Roman cistern. The structure on the side of the bell tower has been identified as the home of St. Clare.

== Interior ==
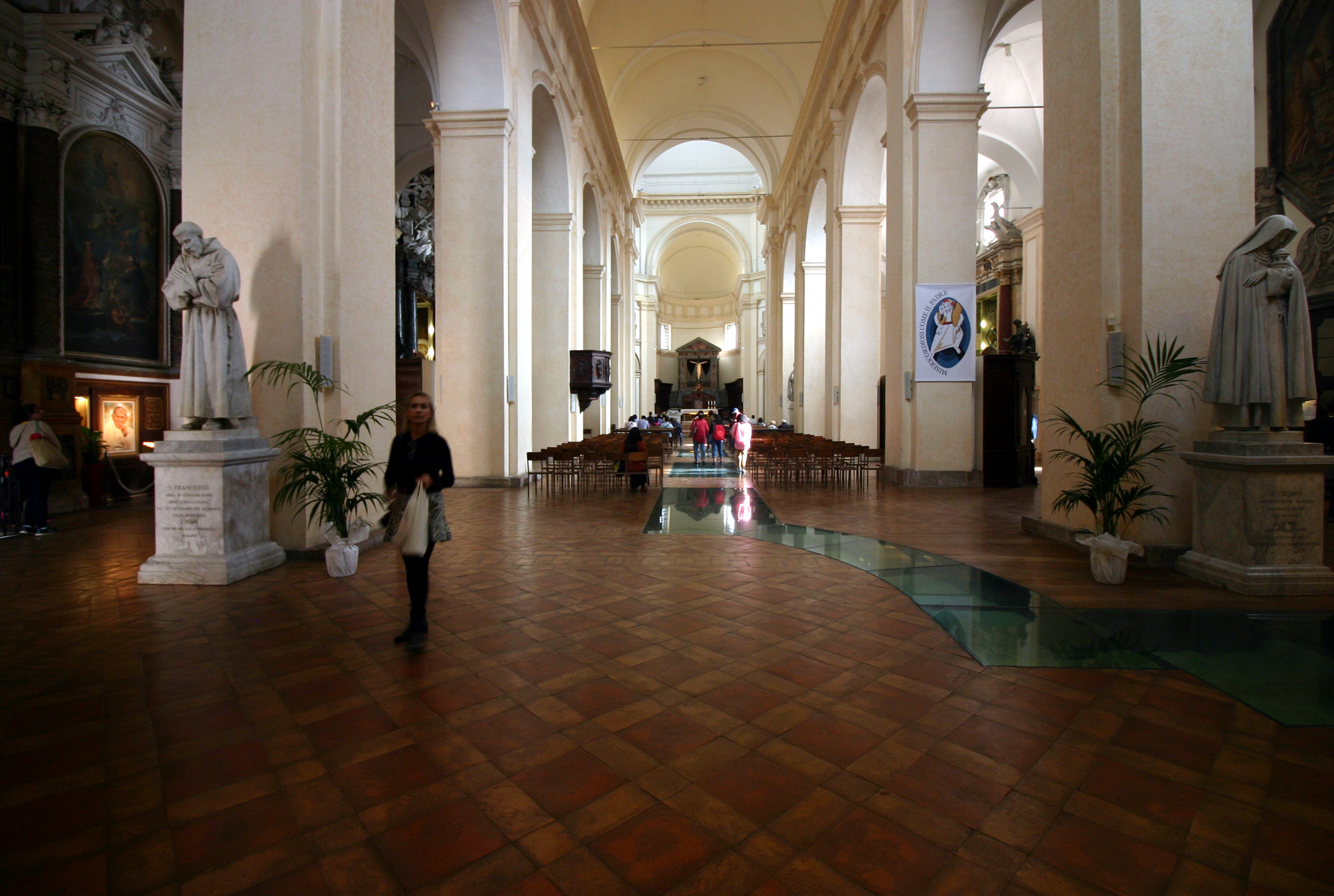
Interior

In 1571 the interior of the cathedral, originally Romanesque in style, was completely modified in late Renaissance style by the architect Gian Galeazzo Alessi from Perugia. It consists of a central nave, two aisles, separated by massive pillars, an apse and a dome.

In the interior, at the baptismal font at the beginning of the right aisle, Saint Francis was baptised in 1182 and Saint Clare in 1193, as were many of their original followers, and in 1838 Saint Gabriel of Our Lady of Sorrows. The font was fashioned from an ancient granite column and is girdled by an iron grating. The terracotta tabernacle was a present in 1882 on the occasion of the 700th anniversary of Saint Francis's birth.

On the right aisle is the Chapel of the Blessed Sacrament in Baroque style (begun in 1541 and enlarged in 1663), partly frescoed in 1663 by the local painter Giacomo Giorgetti, a pupil of Giovanni Lanfranco. The nine wall paintings are attributed to the 17th-century painter Andrea Carlone.

The Chapel of Our Lady of Consolation was built in 1496 as a consequence of a miracle. In 1494 people had seen the image of Our Lady of Sorrows weeping over the Christ in her arms. This German terracotta sculpture from the early 15th century has recently been stolen. An identical wooden copy now stands at the same place.

The 19th-century main altar stands under the octagonal Renaissance crossing dome over the remains of Saint Rufinus. On both sides stand the marble statues of Saint Francis and Saint Clare by Giovanni Duprè. In the apse stands the majestic choir, with 22 stalls, decorated with wooden carvings by Giovanni di Pier Jacopo da San Severino (1520). The statue of Saint Rufinus by Lemoyne stands at the center of the choir.

There are several paintings by Dono Doni: Christ adored by Saints (1555); on the two altars on both sides of the major one, there are two more works: Deposition (1562) and Crucifixion (1563).

Under the cathedral there is a crypt with the pagan Roman sarcophagus from the 3rd century, asserted to have once contained the remains of Saint Rufinus. It bears across its front, as many sarcophagi do, a bas-relief with the myth of Diana and Endymion, offering a pagan vision of tranquil afterlife. Here are also the Pozzo della Mensa, a medieval well, and the ruins of a Carolingian cloister from the 10th century.

== Museo del Duomo ==
The Museo Diocesano e Cripta di San Rufino ("Museum of the Cathedral and Crypt of San Rufino") was opened in 1941. It houses a collection of artworks and liturgical objects associated with the cathedral, including:

- The front panel of a 3rd-century AD Roman sarcophagus, depicting Nikai Clipeofore (victory figures bearing shields) and a libation scene.
- Detached frescoes of the Madonna and Child by the Master of Saint Clare (late 13th century).
- Detached frescoes depicting the Passion and Crucifixion by Puccio Capanna (1334), originally from the Oratory of San Rufinuccio.
- Processional banner of the Confraternity of Saints Francis and Leonard (1378), painted by the Master of the Gonfalone di San Leonardo.
- A reliquary containing wood from the True Cross, gilded in gold and dating to the second half of the 15th century.
- Polyptych of the Story of Saint Rufinus (1462) by Niccolò Alunno.
- Aedicule of the Confraternity of the Most Holy Sacrament (c. 1475), with detached frescoes by Matteo da Gualdo.
- Predella in two panels (1563) by Dono Doni, depicting Saint Gregory the Great and Saint Lawrence.
- Processional banner of the Confraternity of Saint Catherine of Alexandria (1627) by Orazio Riminaldi.
- Dying Saint Francis Blesses the City of Assisi (1640), a canvas by Cesare Sermei, originally from the Palazzo Vescovile.
- Processional banner of the Confraternity of Saint Lawrence (1673) by Giovanni Andrea Carlone.
- Other works by Pace di Bartolo, Giovanni di Pieriacopo da San Severino, Lorenzo Doni, Raffaello Coda, and Girolamo Marinelli.
- Liturgical documents and objects dating from the 17th century to the present.
- The Frederick Mason Perkins Collection, consisting of 32 works by artists including Giovanni Boccati, Jacopo della Quercia, Filippo Lippi, Francesco di Giorgio Martini, and Giovanni Santi.

== See also ==
- Cathedral architecture
