= Santa Croce, Bastia Umbria =

Italian historic church

Coordinates: 43°04′04″N 12°33′00″E

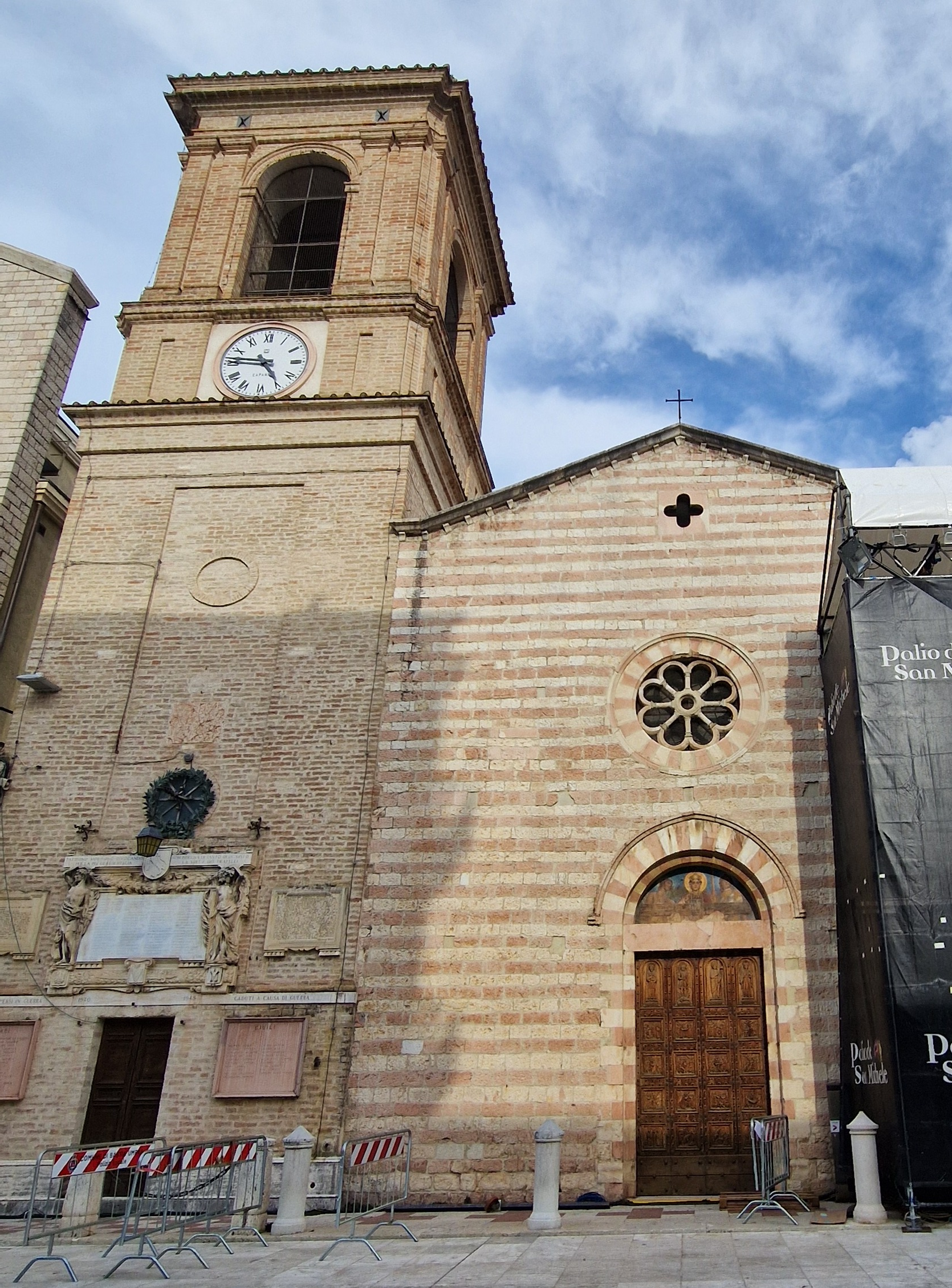

Santa Croce is a Gothic style, Roman Catholic church in Piazza Mazzini, in the center of Bastia Umbra, in the region of Umbria, Italy.

== History ==
The church was originally built alongside a Franciscan monastery. The monastery had once housed the tomb of the Blessed Corrado da Offida, but the relics were moved by Perugian overlords to the church of San Francesco al Prato in Perugia. It was originally built outside the city walls of the then town of Isola, and not encompassed until the defenses of the town were rebuilt and expanded in 1380. In 1653, the monastery was suppressed by Pope Innocent X, and the church became a parish and priory. In 1788, Pope Pius VI, at the request of Bishop Carlo Zangheri established a college of nine canons in Santa Croce.

Earthquakes from 1832 and 1854 made the bell-tower collapse. Restoration was pursued starting in 1855 giving the church the present form. The church formerly had early 16th-century frescoes by Tiberio d'Assisi painted in the apse, but it was torn down during restoration. In 1962, the parish church of the town was moved to the new adjacent church of San Michele Arcangelo.

== Description ==
The main portal is decorated by carved wood reliefs depicting the Via Crucis (1942), by Domenico Mammoli. The polychrome flooring with geometric designs was laid in 1932. The interiors of the church were decorated between 1884 and 1886 by Domenico Bruschi with tempera wall paintings, including the apse dome with God the Father, Jesus Christ blessing the Madonna, and Saints John the Baptist, Peter, and Paul. The spandrels depict the four evangelists. Inside the church walls are detached frescoes moved here from other sites.

In one of the chapels is the Polyptych of Sant’Angelo (1499) by Niccolò Alunno; the painting was formerly the main altarpiece of the former Church of Sant’Angelo. In the apse walls are a detached fresco (formerly at the church of Sant'Angelo) depicting the Enthroned Madonna and Child and a St Luke (1510–1512) by Tiberio d’Assisi.

Other works in the church are:

- Baptism of Jesus (mid 19th century) by Decio Trabalza.
- Polyptych of the Holy Cross (1885) by Domenico Bruschi .
- Supper at Emmaus (1886) by Domenico Bruschi .
- St Helen and St Michael Archangel (1903) Stained glass windows by the Francesco Moretti assisted by his nephew Ludovico Caselli;
- St Anthony the Abbot heals a cripple and exorcises a possessed woman (first half of 17th century) by Cesare Sermei, from the high altar of the demolished Church of St Anthony the Abbot.
- Madonna and Child Jesus (16th century) fresco attributed to Dono Doni
- Frescoes in the Chapel of St John the Baptist (1884–1886) by Bruschi
