= Pino Lancetti =

Italian fashion designer and businessperson

- Born: 27 November 1932; Bastia Umbra, Kingdom of Italy
- Died: 8 March 2007 (aged 74); Rome, Italy
- Occupation(s): Fashion designer and retailer

Giuseppe "Pino" Lancetti (27 November 1932 – 8 March 2007) was an Italian fashion designer and the founder of the Lancetti fashion label. He was nicknamed the "sarto pittore" ("tailor painter").

== Life and career ==
Born in Bastia Umbra, Lancetti studied at the Accademia San Bernardino di Betto in Perugia, and in 1954 he moved to Rome where he opened an atelier in Via Margutta. In 1961, he launched his first ready-to-wear at Palazzo Pitti in Florence, and in 1963 he had his breakout with a military-inspired collection.

Between late 1960s and 1970s Lancetti presented several collections inspired by famous painters, which got him the nickname of "sarto pittore" ("tailor painter"). He got significant international success, notably in Japan, and he dressed many celebrities, including Audrey Hepburn, Ginger Rogers, Silvana Mangano, Annie Girardot, Queen Paola of Belgium, Soraya Esfandiary-Bakhtiary, Salima Aga Khan. In 2002, he sold his company to a Turin-based group and retired. He died after a long illness on 8 March 2007, at the age of 74.
