= Lucy Olcott =

American art historian and dealer

Lucy Olcott (1877–1922) was an American art historian and dealer who specialized in the art of Siena as well as Egyptian antiquities, working for both the Metropolitan Museum of Art and the Cleveland Museum of Art. She was co-author (with historian William Heywood) of the widely-read Guide to Siena, published in 1903.

== Early life and family ==
Lucy May Olcott was born 1 May 1877 in Manhattan, the daughter of Emmet Robinson Olcott, a member of the New York bar, and Mary Gardner Olcott (nee Clapp). She was raised in New York and graduated from the Normal School (Hunter College) in 1897. After graduation she traveled to Italy with her mother, where she met the art historian Frederick Mason Perkins, her future husband.

== Adult life ==
=== Marriage and work in Italy ===
Olcott married Perkins in 1900, after which the couple settled in Siena, forming part of a network of historians and connoisseurs that included Robert Langton Douglas and Robert H. Hobart Cust. Olcott collaborated with historian William Heywood on Guide to Siena, which was published in 1903 and positively received. Her contribution shed new light on Sienese art history, as well as proposing a number of new artistic attributions. The popularity of the book resulted in the production of multiple editions. Olcott also collaborated with Bernard Berenson and his wife Mary Berenson, publishing articles in Burlington Magazine and Italian art journals. Olcott was also involved with the curation of a major Sienese art exhibition in 1904. Her expertise in Sienese art was demonstrated through her contributions in Bryan’s Dictionary of Painters and Engravers, providing several artists' biographies. G. C. Williamson particularly noted her superior efforts on the biographies of Ambrogio Lorenzetti, Pietro Lorenzetti, Vechietta and Simone Martini. The marriage broke down during her time in Siena, and she then moved to the US.

=== Work in the United States ===
Olcott found a position at the Metropolitan Museum of Art, working with the library collection to augment its collection of photographs as well drawing upon her expertise to publish articles on more-obscure works of the Italian Renaissance in the museum's collection. She later served as the first Museum Instructor for the Met, responsible for the education of both teachers as well as the general public. She left the Met in 1909 when her affair with curator Bryson Burroughs was brought to light and transitioned to work as a private secretary for Bernard Berenson in 1909. She left Berenson's employ in 1911 and connected with Rita de Acosta Lydig, working for her and other clients as a private dealer.

Earlier in her career, Olcott had studied with Theodore Davis, being present during his archaeological work in Egypt in 1905. When the soon-to-be-opened Cleveland Museum of Art was looking to develop a collection of Egyptian art, Henry Kent of the Met recommended Olcott for the role. She served as an acquisition agent for both the Cleveland Museum of Art as well as the Brooklyn Museum of Art, filling 24 crates of antiquities to create their collections. She also acquired a number of ancient Egyptian textiles and carved panels for the Metropolitan Museum of Art.

== Death and legacy ==
Olcott had struggled with mental illness during her life and in 1913 was placed in an asylum in London. She was brought back to the US by her brother Herman and was placed in the Ward's Island hospital, where she died in 1922. However her contributions to the understanding of Siena's art and history were considered crucial for both scholars as well as the general public.

== Sources ==
- Berenson, Bernard (1987). The Letters of Bernard Berenson and Isabella Stewart Gardner, 1887-1924, with correspondence by Mary Berenson. Boston: Northeastern University Press. ISBN 0930350898.
- Bryan, Michael; Williamson, George Charles (1903). Bryan's Dictionary of Painters and Engravers. Macmillan.
- Cade, Leslie (5 February 2016). "The Lure of Ancient Egypt: Formation of the Egyptian Collection". The Cleveland Museum of Art.
- Clapp, Ebenezer (2018). The Clapp Memorial Record of the Clapp Family in America (Nachdruck der Ausgabe von 1876 ed.). Norderstedt. ISBN 9783337682132.
- Heywood, William; Olcott, Lucy (1903). Guide to Siena: History and Art. E. Torrini. OCLC 6980800.
- Kozloff, Arielle (1999). "History of the Egyptian Collection of the Cleveland Museum of Art'". In Berman, Lawrence Michael; Bohač, Kenneth J (eds.). Catalogue of Egyptian Art: the Cleveland Museum of Art. Cleveland Museum of Art; Distributed by Hudson Hills Press. ISBN 978-0-940717-53-4. OCLC 924816406.
- Patrick, Darryl (2003). "Perkins, F(rederick Francis) Mason". Grove Art Online. Oxford University Press. doi:10.1093/gao/9781884446054.article.t066474.
- Ricci, Corrado (1904). Il palazzo pubblico di Siena e la mostra d'antica arte senese. Bergamo: Instituto Italiano d’arti grafiche.
- Tedbury, Imogen (2 June 2019a). "Collaboration and Correction: Re-examining the Writings of Lucy Olcott Perkins, 'a lady resident in Siena'". Interdisciplinary Studies in the Long Nineteenth Century. 2019 (28). doi:10.16995/ntn.838. ISSN 1755-1560. S2CID 195491483.
- Tedbury, Imogen (3 June 2019b). "Lucy May Perkins (1877–1922)". Interdisciplinary Studies in the Long Nineteenth Century. 2019 (28). doi:10.16995/ntn.846. ISSN 1755-1560. S2CID 195458997.
