= Ospedalicchio =

- Frazione
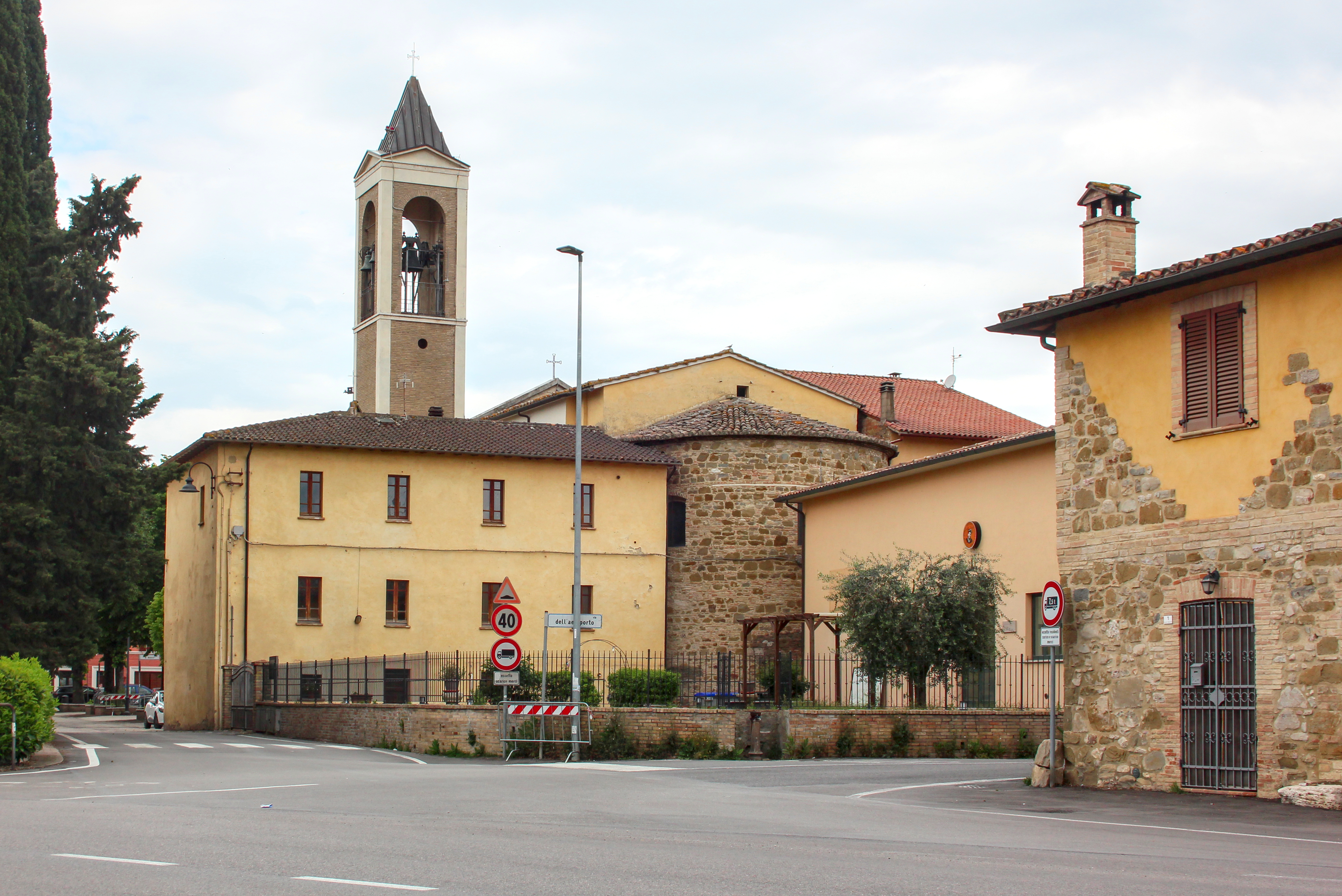
- Ospedalicchio

- Location within Italy
- Coordinates: 43°04′52″N 12°30′14″E
- Country: Italy
- Region: Umbria
- Province: Perugia
- Comune: Bastia Umbra
- Elevation: 199 m (653 ft)

Population (2001)
  - Total: 1,139
- Time zone: UTC+1 (CET)
  - Summer (DST): UTC+2 (CEST)
- Postcode: 06083
- Area code: 075

Ospedalicchio is a borough of the municipality of Bastia Umbra in the Province of Perugia, Umbria, central Italy. It stands at an elevation of 199 metres above sea level. At the time of the Istat census of 2001 it had 1139 inhabitants.
