= Serafino Romualdi =

Serafino Romualdi (18 November 1900 – November 1967) was an Italian writer, labor unionist and anti-fascist activist. He was an official with United States unions and labor federations in their work in Central and South America.

== Biography ==
Serafino Romualdi was born in Bastia Umbra (Perugia), Italy, on 18 November 1900. He graduated from Teachers' College (Perugia) in 1917 and began teaching in grade school. He was a civilian member of the Italian Government's Commission for the Requisition of Cereals in 1919 and 1920, returning to teaching in 1921. Romualdi was editor of a weekly labour paper in Pesaro, Italy, called "Il Progresso" during 1922, but was compelled, because of his opposition to Fascism, to leave for the United States in 1923. He first settled in Chicago, where he became editor of another weekly paper, "La Parola del Popolo". In addition, Romualdi joined the Typographers Union as a linotype operator. In 1926, he was employed by the Italian Labor Publishing Company in Chicago.

In 1928, Romualdi moved to New York, where he became editorial writer for the Italian-language daily trade union Newspaper "Il Mundo", jointly owned by the Italian locals of the International Ladies' Garment Workers' Union and the Amalgamated Clothing Workers of America. In 1933, he joined the International Ladies' Garment Workers' Union as a member of the Editorial and Publicity Departments.

In July 1941, Romualdi went to Argentina, Uruguay and Brazil, where, as a representative of the Free Italy Committee, he directed a campaign to enlist the Italian population in those countries to the side of the Allies. After Pearl Harbor, he joined the staff of the Coordinator of Inter-American Affairs, Nelson Rockefeller. Romualdi founded the Italian-American Committee for Democratic Education with headquarters in Montevideo, Uruguay. He also worked closely with the Committee for the Political Defense of the Continent, whose main objective was to counteract the activities of the Nazi and Fascist agents.

In 1943, Romualdi returned to Washington, where he worked in the labor division of the Coordinator's office, then headed by John Herling. He joined the Office of Strategic Services in May 1944, where he remained until April 1945, when he was assigned to make a survey of the effects of United States policy in Europe on the large European population in South America.

Romualdi resumed his work with the ILGWU in the fall of 1945, and was assigned by the American Federation of Labor to establish contacts with Latin American Labor with the view of promoting closer cooperation between the democratic trade unions of the two continents. In this capacity, he toured Central and South America several times; was a member of the AFL labor delegation that visited Argentina in January 1947 and was one of the AFL delegates to the conference at Lima, Peru (in January 1948) at which the Inter-American Confederation of Workers was organized. Later, in 1951, he played a leading role in the organizing the Inter-American Regional Organization of Workers (ORIT), of which he became Assistant Secretary and editor of its Inter-American Labor Bulletin.

In March 1948, Romualdi was appointed full-time Latin American representative of the AFL. He was a member of the Joint AFL-CIO Commission that investigated labor conditions in the Central Zone in January 1949, and was a member of the US delegation to the conventions of the International Confederation of Free Trade Unions (ICFTU) held in Milan in 1951; Vienna in 1955; and Tunis in 1957.

Romualdi attended ILO conferences either as a US labor delegate or Labor advisor: in Mexico City and Montreal in 1946; San Francisco in 1948; Montevideo in 1960 and Buenos Aires in 1961. In August 1957, he attended the Inter-American Economic Conference held in Buenos Aires as a labor advisor to the US delegation. He attended, also as an advisor, the Punta del Este Conference in August 1961, at which the Alliance for Progress was launched. Romualdi also attended various presidential inaugurations of Latin American countries, either as a representative or a personal guest.

After the 1955 merger of the AFL and the CIO, Romualdi was named Inter-American Representative of the new organization and Executive Secretary of the AFL-CIO Inter-American Affairs Committee. Shortly after the establishment of the American Institute for Free Labor Development in 1961, in which he played a leading role, Romualdi became its executive director. The institute, a non-profit organization supported by labor, business and government, trained selected young leaders from Latin American and Caribbean nations in trade union fundamentals, the democratic process, defense tactics against infiltration by totalitarians or racketeers and the role of unions in the community.

Romualdi was a member of the Citizens Committee for a Free Cuba, founded in 1963.

In September 1965, he retired from his posts with the AFL-CIO and the AIFLD to undertake consulting work and to complete his memoirs, entitled Presidents and Peons, which were published in 1967 by Funk and Wagnalls. Mr. Romualdi was married to the former Miriam Blecher Friedman. Each had a son by a previous marriage. Serafino Romualdi died in November 1967.

== Sources ==
- Biographical note on Serafino Romuali
