= Costano =

- Frazione
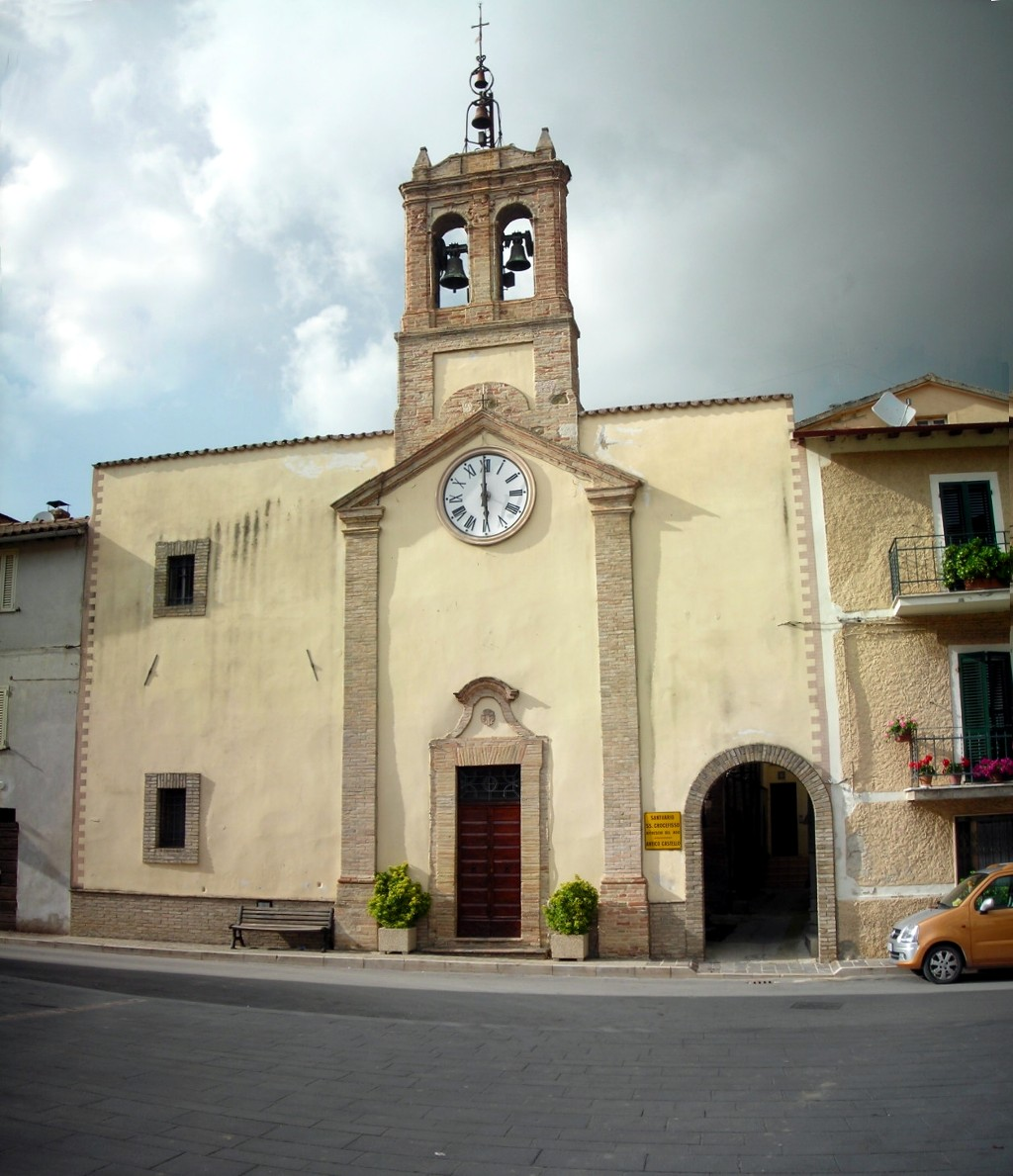
- Costano

- Location within Italy
- Coordinates: 43°02′36″N 12°32′01″E
- Country: Italy
- Region: Umbria
- Province: Perugia
- Comune: Bastia Umbra
- Elevation: 191 m (627 ft)

Population (2001)
  - Total: 782
- Time zone: UTC+1 (CET)
  - Summer (DST): UTC+2 (CEST)
- Postcode: 06083
- Area code: 075

Costano is a frazione of the comune of Bastia Umbra in the Province of Perugia, Umbria, central Italy. It stands at an elevation of 191 metres above sea level. At the time of the Istat census of 2001 it had 782 inhabitants.
