= Shop fitting =

Shop fitting (shopfitting) is the business of fitting out retail and service shops with equipment and fixtures. It applies to all kinds of outlets — small corner shops to hypermarkets. A shop fitter executes planning, designs the shop layout, and installs equipment and services. A shop fitting firm typically incorporates professional expertise in interior design, manufacturing of bespoke furniture, signage and fittings, and purchasing of retail equipment.

A shop fitting cycle begins with a survey and measurement of available space and preparing design drawings for submission to the client. Alternatively, the client may have their own drawings prepared by an independent interior designer. The shop fitter arranges for purchase of standard equipment and merchandise or production of bespoke furniture, delivers and physically installs them—until the shop is ready for daily operation.

There are different requirements to the different branches and types of shop. Fashion shop design requires up-to-the-minute awareness of current trends in colour and style to create stores that will draw customers in.

== Systems ==
'Shopfitting system' refers to a product range made to satisfy the needs of shopfitters and ultimately retailers for display and merchandising goods. A shopfitting system can be adapted from combinations of standardized components for a particular retail application. A manufacturer would normally launch new shopfitting systems on a 2-year basis. Leading manufacturers would offer design oriented systems, followers would reinterpret them making the display solution achievable with as many as existing items as possible, hoping that retailers will choose their product because of the cheap price.

Shopfitting systems are usually connected to a "modular" concept, meaning that each item has more than one use. This economically goes into the rules of "network", where one element has the value of three, if added to another element, because 1x1=1 but 2x2=4: an extra item designed and compatible with others, has very high value. Companies such as Apex Display specialise in modular shopfitting systems, offering configurable components that allow retailers to adapt store layouts quickly and efficiently.

== Shop fitting profession ==
Shop fitting is a profession that involves the fit-out of retail outlets like corner shops, department stores, convenience stores, supermarkets and hypermarkets with equipment, fixtures and fittings. It’s carried out by a shop fitter who executes all planning, design, layout and installation of equipment and services. A shop fitter brings interior design expertise and assists in the design of bespoke furniture, fittings and signage and also with the buying of retail equipment.

The process begins with a survey of the retail premises and measurement of available space. The next stage is the preparation of design, which is then submitted to the client for review and approval. Some clients provide their own design drawings that are prepared by another interior designer. Finally, the shop fitter arranges for the purchase of standard equipment and the production of the bespoke furniture, which is delivered and installed – ready for the shop operation.

Shop fitting is a precision-orientated profession that requires intricacy and exceptional attention to detail in order to meet client requirements.
