= Rufinus of Assisi =

3rd-century Christian saint

Saint Rufinus of Assisi
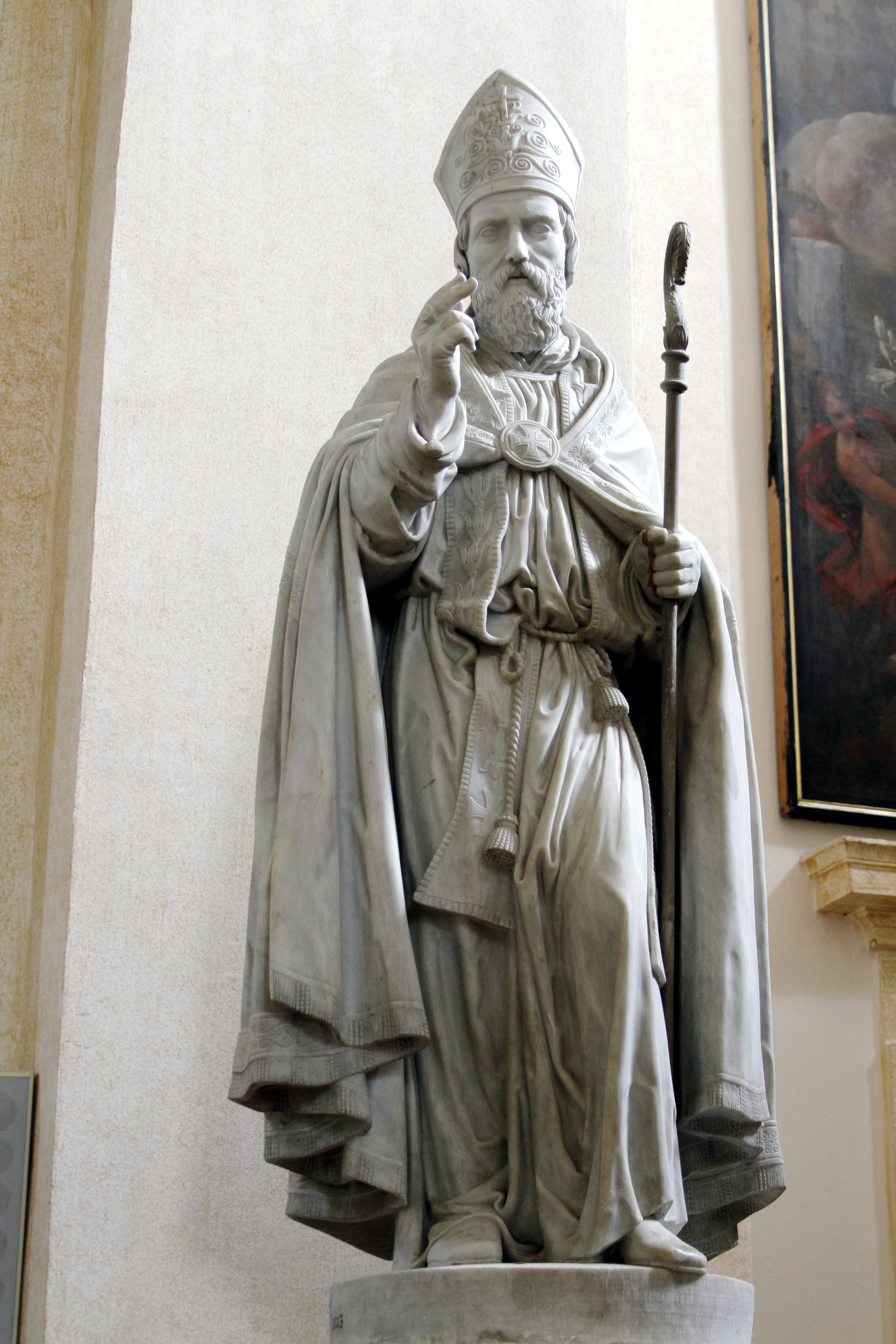
- Saint Rufinus in the Cathedral of San Rufino

Martyr
- Born: unknown
- Died: 238 or 239; Costano
- Venerated in: Roman Catholicism, Eastern Orthodoxy
- Major shrine: Cathedral of San Rufino
- Patronage: Assisi

According to legend, Rufinus of Assisi (Italian: Rufino), was the first bishop of the city of Assisi, Italy, and a martyr.

Sources concerning the life of Saint Rufino are a sermon of eleventh century Peter Damian, (Miracula Sancti Rufini Martyris), and a Passio Sancti Rufini of the 14th century. The Acts of the martyrdom of this Rufinus are purely legendary. He is probably identical with the "episcopus Marsorum" (bishop of the Marsi) noted in the Roman Martyrology under 11 August.

== Legend ==
Rufinus was responsible for converting Assisi to Christianity, but at what date is disputed. He and his son came from Anatolia to preach the Gospel. At some point, the Roman proconsul, Aspasius, had him arrested, tortured, and drowned in the Chiascio River near Costano. His body was recovered and buried near where he was found. A church was built on that spot from whence, according to Petrus Damiani, his relics were translated to Assisi in the 8th century.

His remains were put to rest in a Roman sarcophagus. The front is sculpted in low relief with the myth of Selene and Endymion. It is now located under the main altar of the Cathedral of San Rufino, which is the third church to have been erected over his remains.

Rufinus is the patron saint of Assisi. Each year, on Thursday, Friday and Saturday of the last week of August, the "Palio of St. Rufinus (Palio Di San Rufino)" is held, a historic re-enactment rooted back in the Middle Ages, consisting of a challenge with crossbows between the three medieval districts, the "Terzieri", to win the Palio (pennant).

== Sources ==
- Ekkart Sauser, Biographisch-Bibliographisches Kirchenlexikon, vol. XXI (2003) pp 1284f (in German)
