= Orazio Riminaldi =

Italian painter

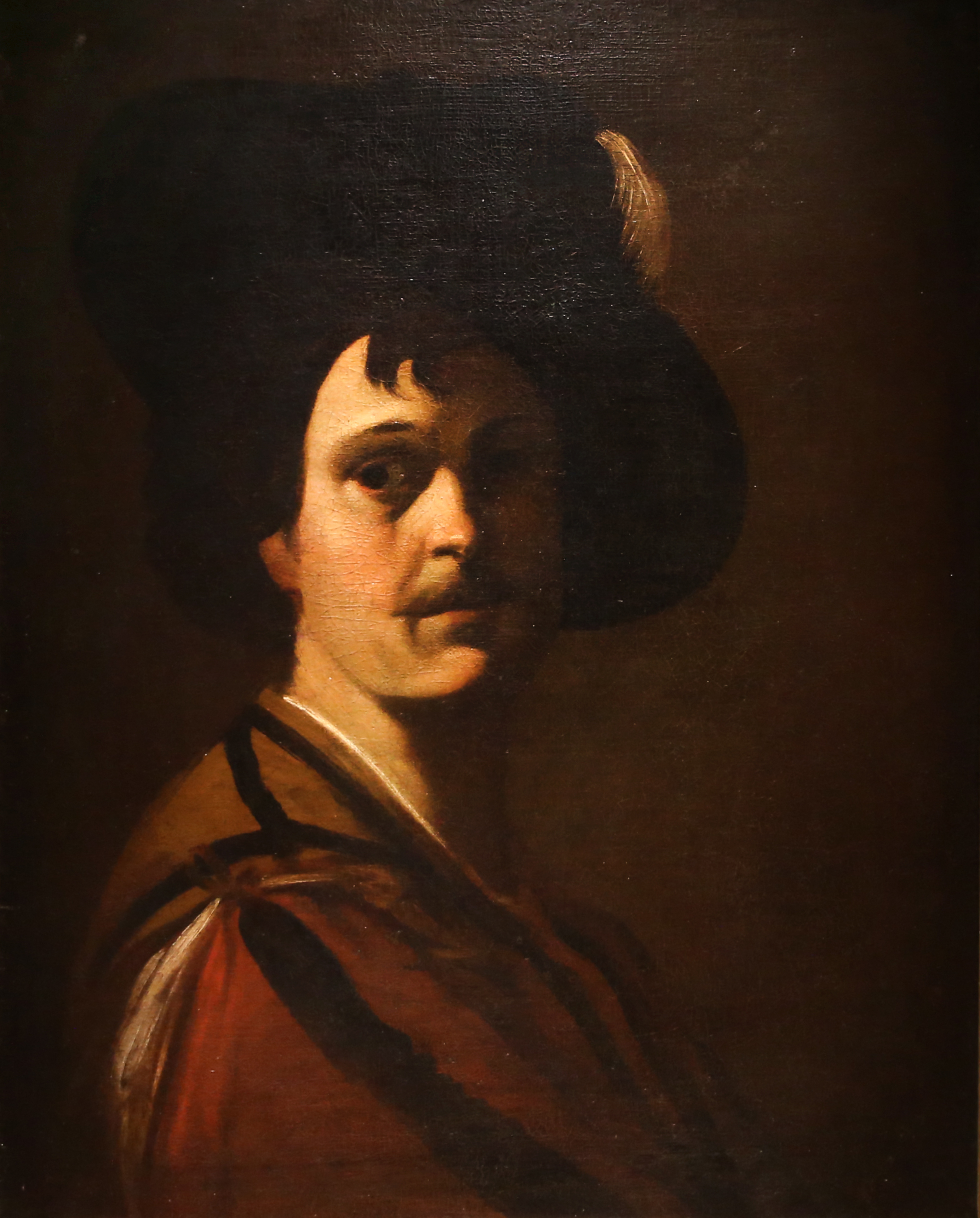
Selfportrait, Uffizi

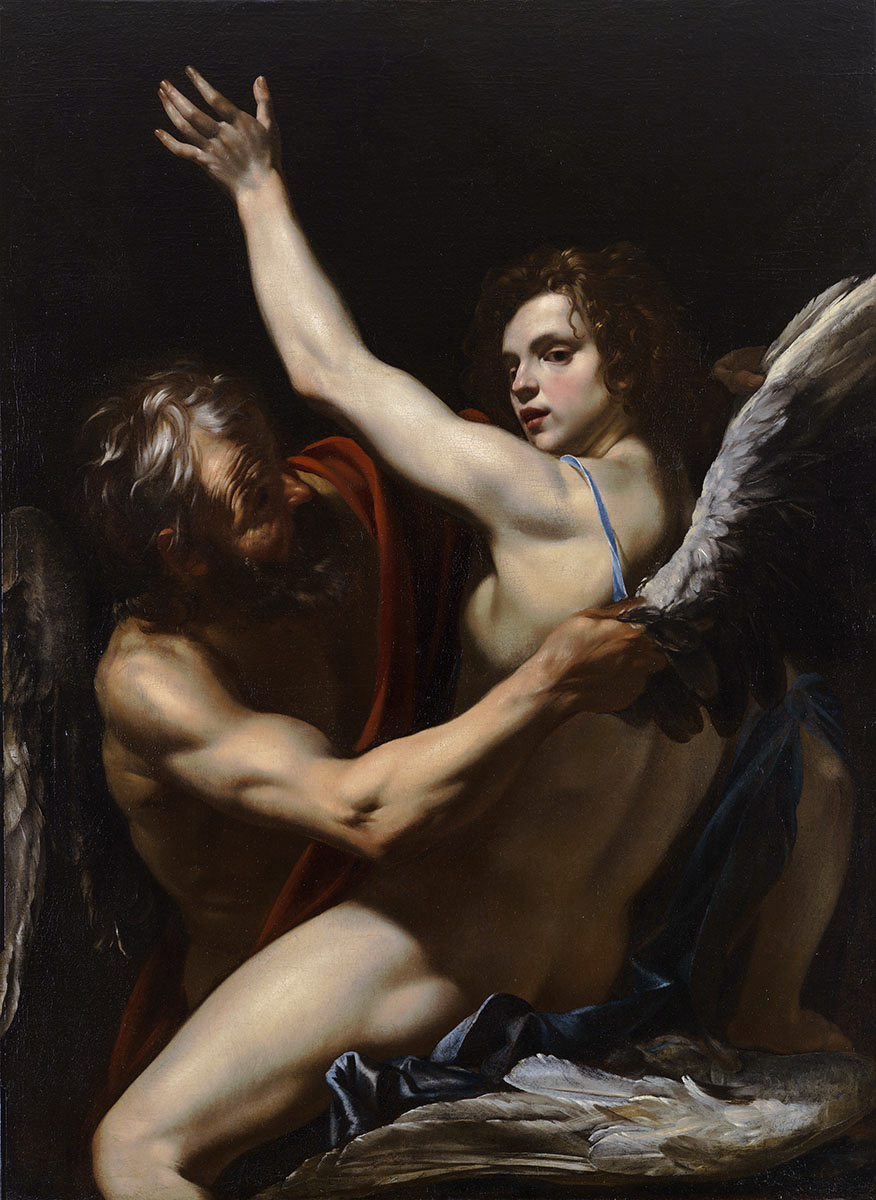
Daedalus and Icarus

Orazio Riminaldi (5 September 1593 – 19 December 1630) was an Italian painter who painted mainly history subjects in a Caravaggist style.

== Biography ==
Riminaldi was born and died in Pisa.

He was in Pisa first a pupil of the little known painter Rainero Alberghetti, and later studied with Aurelio Lomi. No works from his early period survive. He moved to Rome sometime between 1610 and 1620. Here he underwent the influence of the Caravaggist movement most likely through Orazio Gentileschi, Domenichino, Bartolomeo Manfredi but also from Simon Vouet.

An early work entitled Samson Killing the Philistines, which he painted for the Cathedral of Pisa and completed in May 1622 shows the influence of Giovanni Lanfranco and Guido Reni of the Emilian school of painting, combined with the naturalistic Caravaggesque style that he had developed in Rome. His knowledge of the work of contemporary French artists working in Rome is also evident in certain paintings attributed to him, such as the Daedalus and Icarus, known in three versions (one of which is in the Wadsworth Atheneum).

His Martyrdom of St. Cecilia dated to the early 1620s (Uffizi, Florence) is regarded as his masterpiece. Riminaldi clearly took direct inspiration for this composition from Caravaggio's Martyrdom of St Matthew (San Luigi dei Francesi in Rome). He took from Caravaggio's earlier work the image of the plummeting angel and the violent gesture of the executioner. The Martyrdom of St. Cecilia shows further stylistic similarities with the works of Bartolomeo Cavarozzi and Artemisia Gentileschi.

He clearly was also active as a portrait artist. He painted a portrait of Curzio Ceuli (c. 1627, private collection in Florence) in a Caravaggesque style not unlike that of Orazio Gentileschi and Valentin de Boulogne.

He died suddenly in 1630 in Pisa of the plague. His Assumption of the Virgin for the Cathedral of Pisa was completed posthumously by his brother Girolamo.

Among his pupils were his brother Giovanni Battista Riminaldi, Alessandro Cominotti and Giovanni Navarretti.

Orazio Rimanaldi Gallery

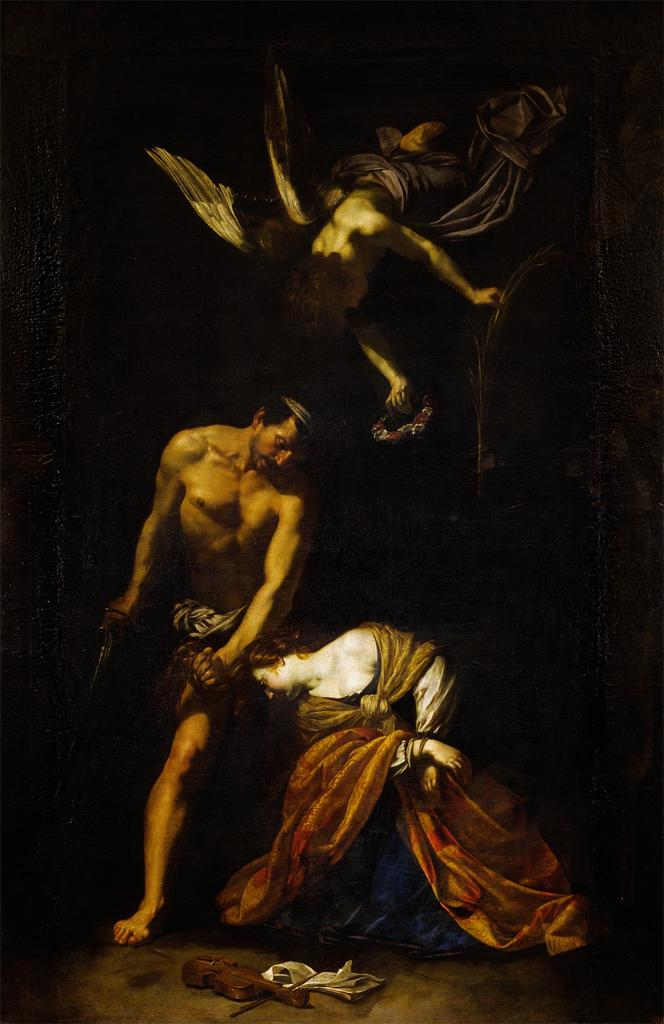
Martyrdom of St Cecilia

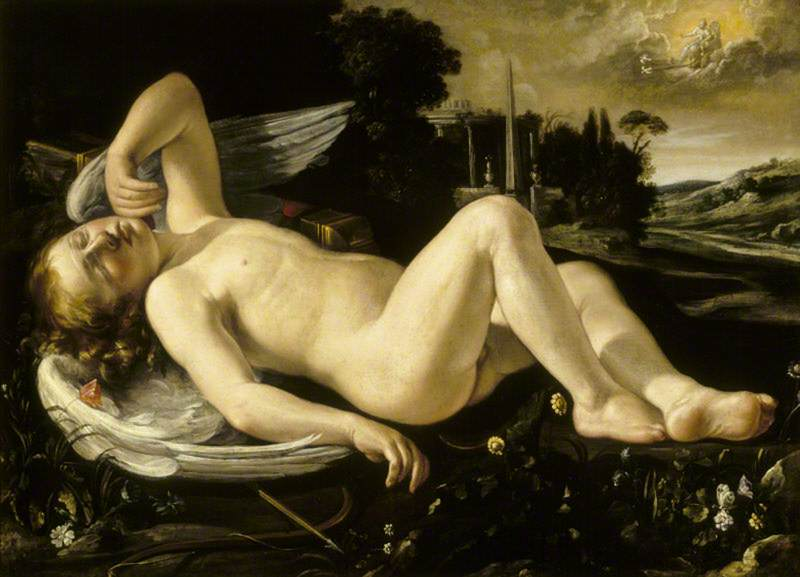
Cupid Asleep Approached by Venus in Her Chariot

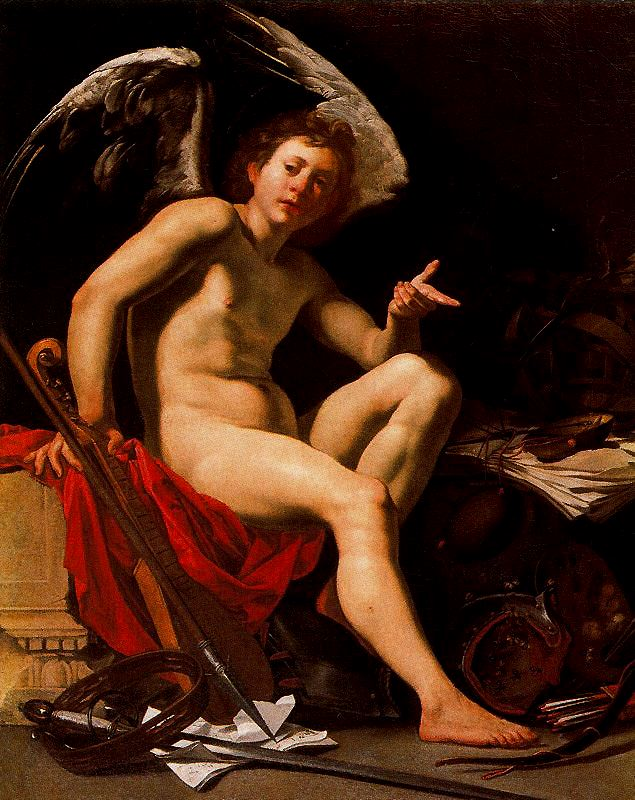
Victorious Amor

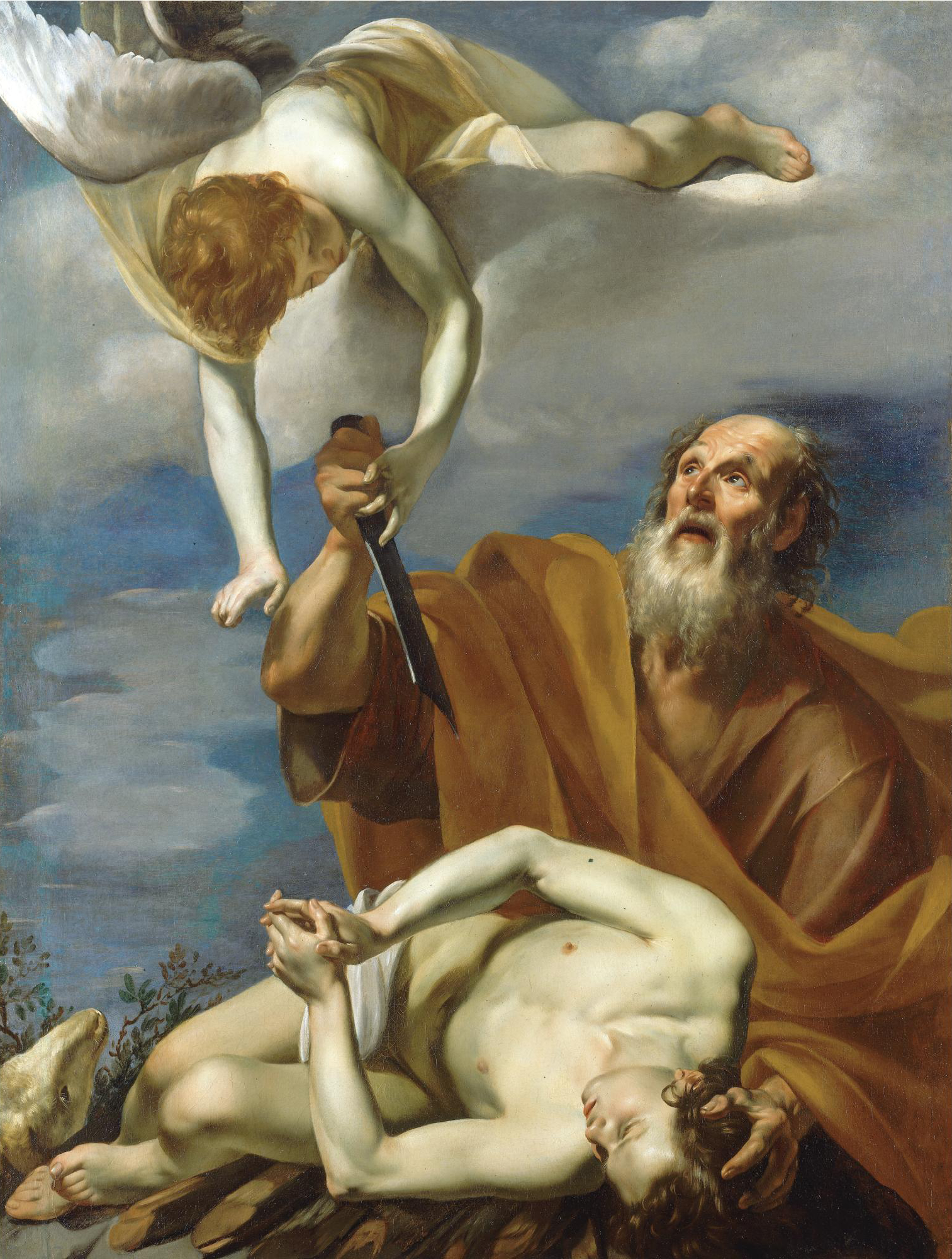
The sacrifice of Isaac
