= Sergio Goretti =

- Bishop of Assisi-Nocera Umbra-Gualdo Tadino
- Church: Catholic Church
- Diocese: Diocese of Assisi-Nocera Umbra-Gualdo Tadino
- In office: 14 December 1980 – 19 November 2005
- Predecessor: Dino Tomassini
- Successor: Domenico Sorrentino

Orders
- Ordination: 5 April 1953
- Consecration: 6 January 1981 by Pope John Paul II

Personal details
- Born: 2 April 1929 Città di Castello, Province of Perugia, Kingdom of Italy
- Died: 22 June 2012 (aged 83) Assisi, Umbria, Italy

Sergio Goretti (2 April 1929 – 22 June 2012) was the Roman Catholic Bishop of Assisi-Nocera Umbra-Gualdo Tadino, Italy.

== Career ==
Ordained to the priesthood in 1953, Goretti was named bishop in 1980 and retired in 2005.
