= Puccio Capanna =

Italian painter

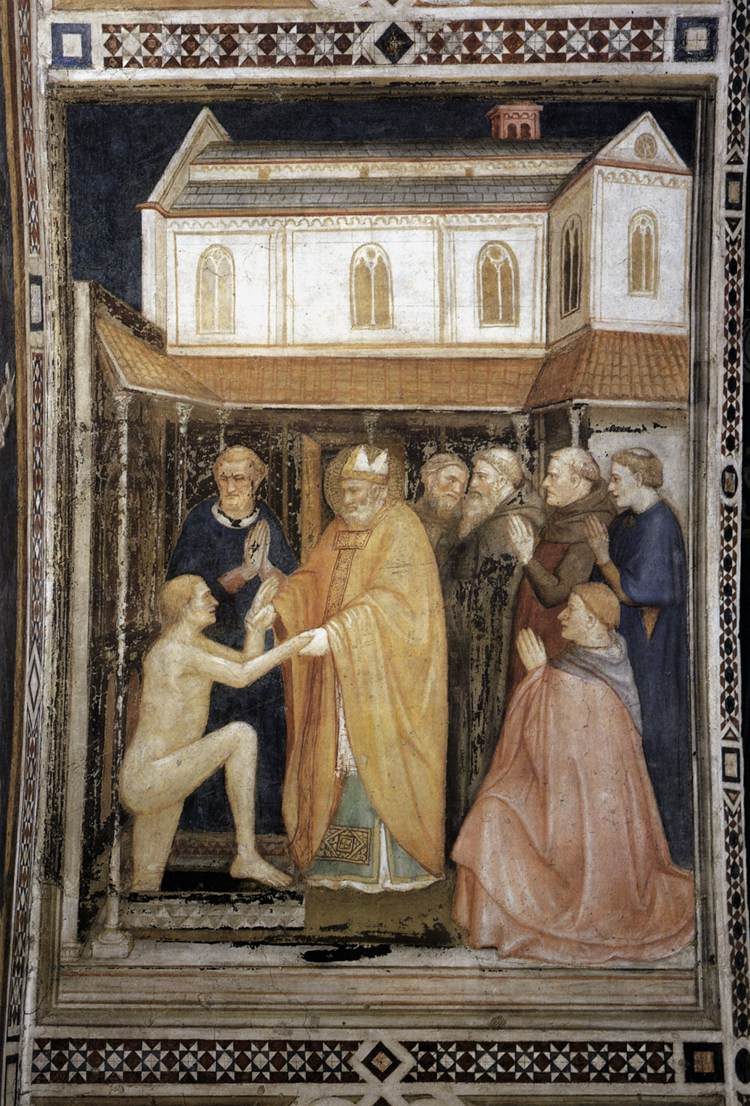
Story of St. Stanislaus, c 1330

Puccio Capanna was an Italian painter of the first half of the 14th century, who lived and worked in Assisi, Umbria, Italy between 1341 and 1347. He is also called Puccio Campana.

Capanna was originally a Florentine. Vasari described him as one of Giotto’s most important pupils, whom the inhabitants of Assisi considered to be a fellow citizen as he had done a lot of paintings in the churches there, e.g. frescos with scenes from the Passion on the vaulting of the lower church of the Basilica of San Francesco d'Assisi. He is said to have painted the Santa Maria Egiziaca (St. Mary of Egypt) in the church of San Francesco in Pistoia and Scenes from the Life of St. Francis and Christ in the chapterhouse there. A document of 1341, confirms the existence of a painter in Assisi named Puccio di Capanna: the authorities commissioned Puccius Cappanej et Cecce Saraceni, pictores de Assisio to paint images of the Virgin and Child with Saints on the Porta externa platee nove and the Porta Sancti Ruphini (Cathedral of San Rufino) (see Abate). Puccio Capanna is also documented in Assisi in 1347, when he sold oxen to the Sacro Convento (Cenci, 1974).

Many of the pieces of art, which he had done according to Fra Ludovico da Pietralunga (16th century) and Vasari do not exist anymore. He died at Assisi.
