= Dono Doni =

Italian painter

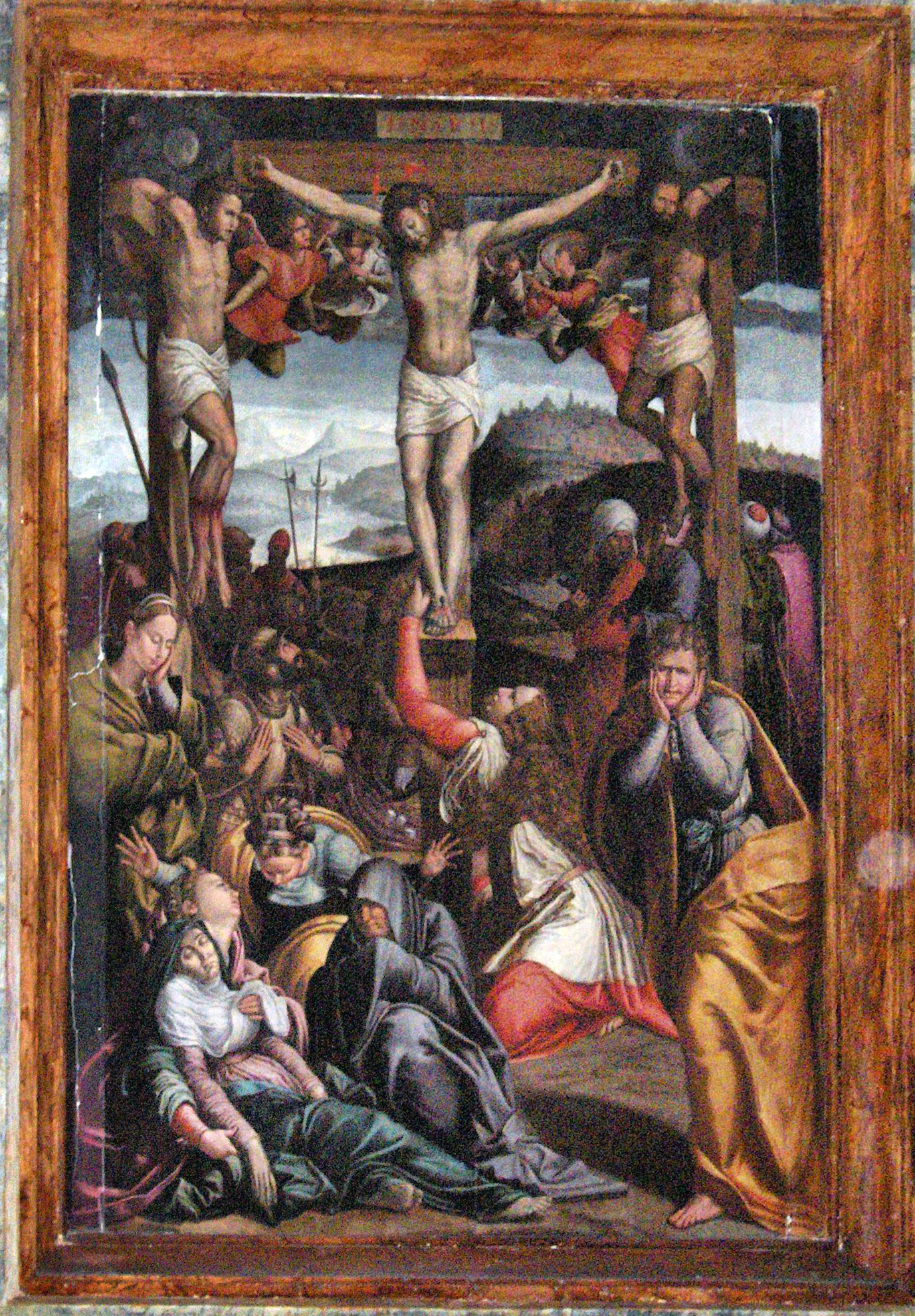
Crucifixion, 1563, in the Assisi Cathedral

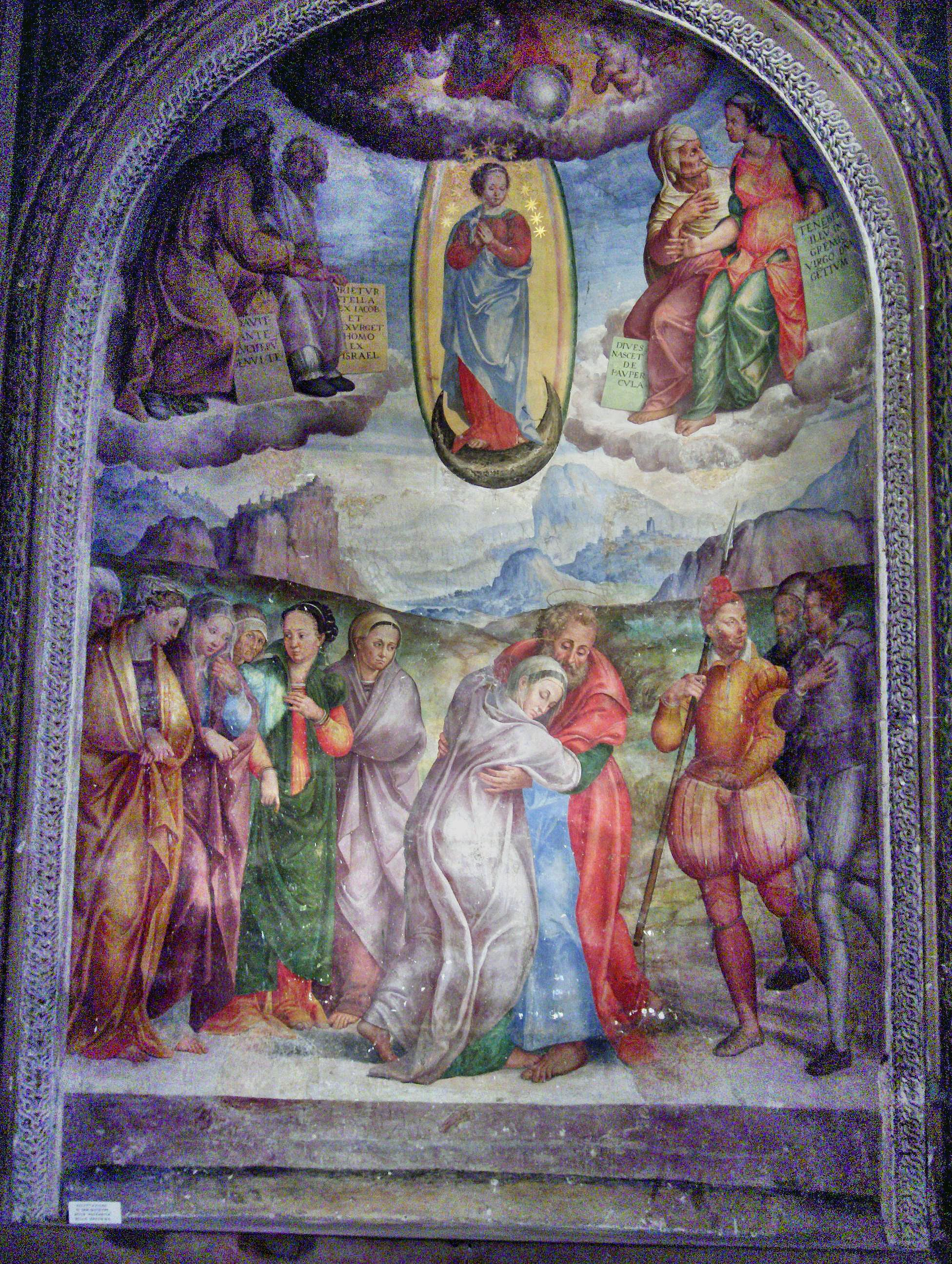
San Gioacchino meets St. Anna, fresco from 1565 attributed to Doni, in the Sant'Andrea Church in Spello

Dono Doni, also known as Adone Doni or Dono dei Doni (1505-1575) was an Italian painter of the Renaissance period active mainly in Umbria.

== Biography ==
Doni was born at Assisi. While Lanzi and others claim he was a disciple of Pietro Perugino, the first we know of Doni was that in 1530 he was an assistant to Giovanni di Pietro (lo Spagna) at San Giacomo in Spoleto.

In the church of San Francesco, at Perugia, is a picture depicting the Last Judgment by Doni;' and one of the Adoration of the Kings is in San Pietro in the same city.

He worked chiefly at Assisi. For the church of San Crispolto of Bettona, he painted an Adoration of the Shepherds (1543), now at the Pinacoteca Civica of the town. For the Ciccoli family chapel at the church of San Francesco in Bevagna, he painted a Madonna and Child (ca. 1565), now in the city picture gallery. In Foligno, he painted a fresco depicting the Nativity with St Lucy (1544) for the monastery of Sant'Anna; a frieze for the Sala Papale (attributed, ca. 1545) of Palazzo Trinci; and a fresco depicting the Martyrdom of St Catherine of Alexandria for the nunnery of Santa Caterina Vecchia, now detached and in the Pinacoteca Civica. In Gubbio, he painted a Pietà (after 1560) and a Road to Calvary (ca. 1564) now in the Duomo. He also worked with Lattanzio Pagani and Cristofano Gherardi at the no longer-extant Rocca Paolina of Perugia.

In the Lower Church of the Franciscan Convent at Assisi there are Doni frescoes depicting the Preaching and Martyrdom of St Stephen, and in the small refectory is the Last Supper (1573), probably his last work. Doni died at Assisi in 1575. Vasari errs in stating that he was a nephew of Taddeo Bartoli. In the Berlin Gallery there is by him a 'Madonna with the Infant Jesus,' who is represented as reaching after a book which is in the Virgin's hand.
