= Pace di Bartolo =

Italian painter (14th century)

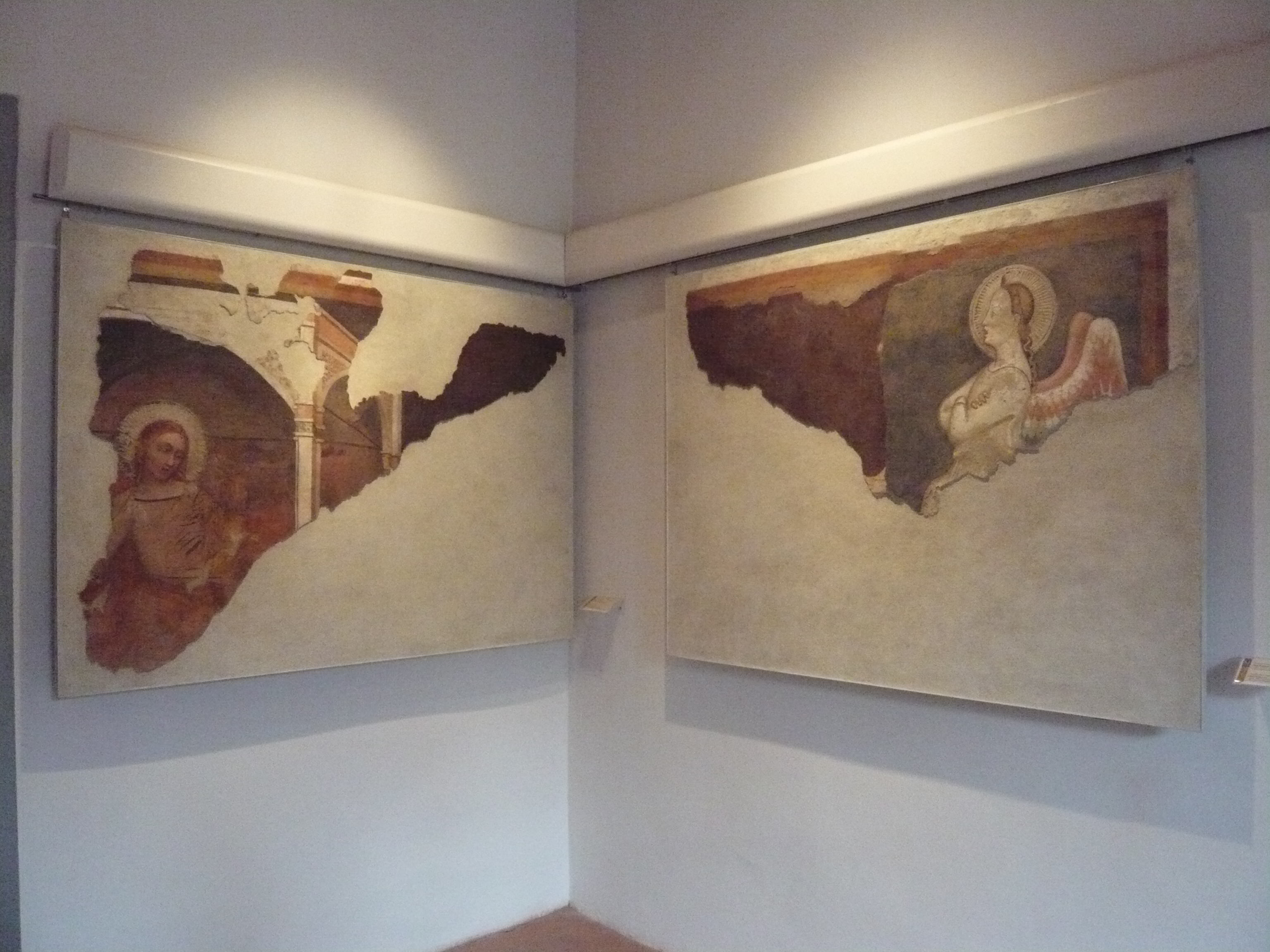
Annonciation, frescoes, Palazzo Vallemani, Assisi.

Pace di Bartolo or Pace da Faenza was an Italian painter, active in Assisi in 1344–1368.

He is mentioned by Giorgio Vasari as a pupil of Giotto, and is said to have executed some decorations in fresco on the exterior of San Giovanni at Bologna. He had a particular talent for representing small figures. About the year 1574, the following works by him existed at Forlì: The Holy Cross, a small picture in tempera, representing the Passion, and Four Scenes from the Life of the Virgin.
