= Basse-taille =

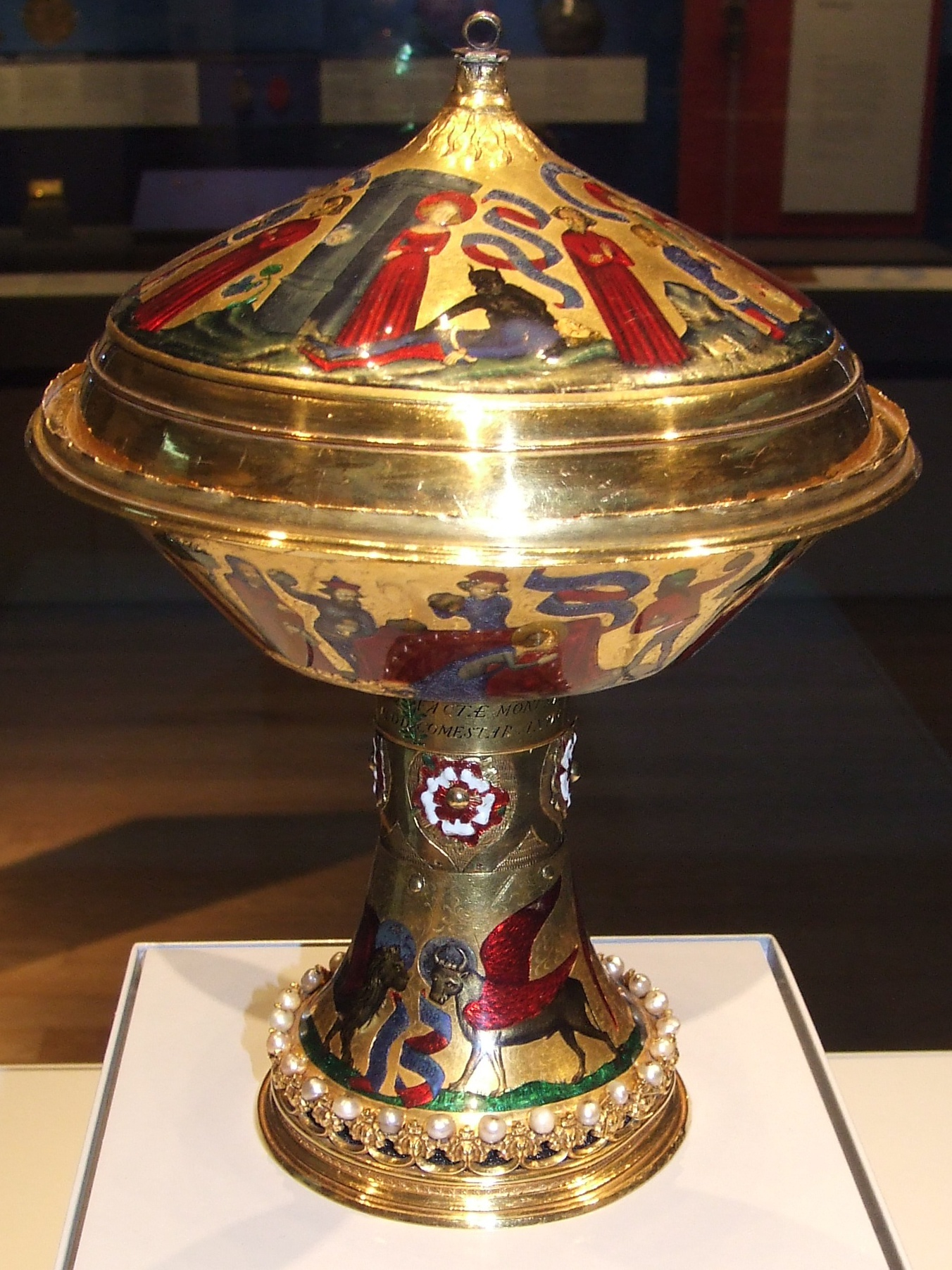
The Royal Gold Cup, 23.6 cm high, 17.8 cm across at its widest point; weight 1.935 kg. British Museum

Basse-taille (bahss-tah-ee) is an enamelling technique in which the artist creates a low-relief pattern in metal, usually silver or gold, by engraving or chasing. The entire pattern is created in such a way that its highest point is lower than the surrounding metal. A translucent enamel is then applied to the metal, allowing light to reflect from the relief and creating an artistic effect. It was used in the late Middle Ages, and then again in the 17th century.

== Medieval examples ==
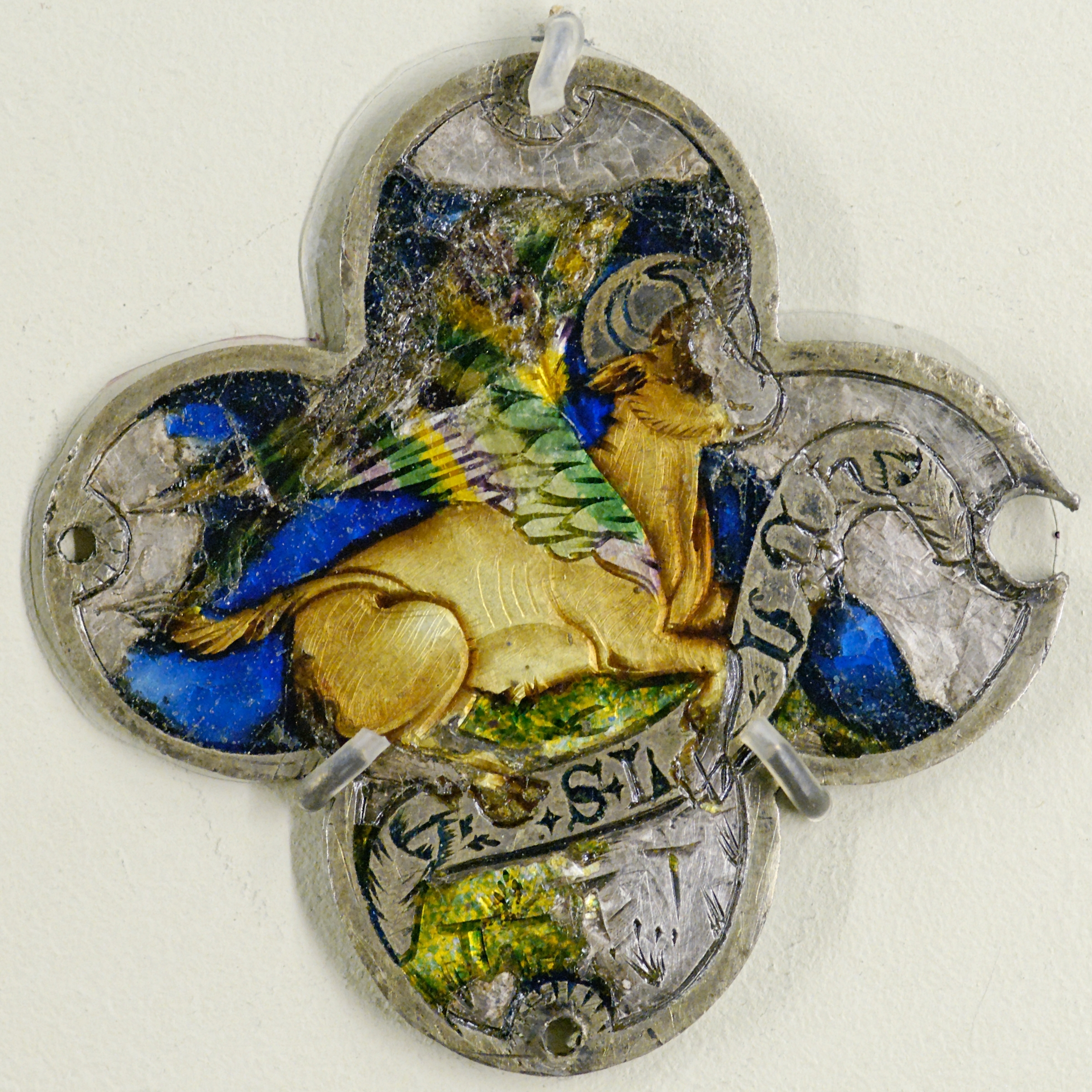
A 14th-century silver plaque in basse-taille with translucent enamels, with considerable losses, showing the prepared metal surfaces beneath, and the tinting with different colours.

The technique had been known to the Ancient Romans, but was lost at the end of the Middle Ages until the 17th century. Translucent enamel is more fragile than opaque enamel, and medieval survivals in good condition are very rare. Medieval examples begin in Italy in the 13th century, with the earliest dated work being a chalice by the Sienese goldsmith Guccio di Mannaia, made for Pope Nicholas IV about 1290, which is part of the collection of the Treasure Museum of the basilica of Saint Francis in Assisi.

The technique then spread to other centres for high-quality courtly work, at a time when the champlevé enamels associated above all with Limoges had become almost mass-produced and relatively cheap. It is generally agreed that the late 14th century Royal Gold Cup, now in the British Museum, is the outstanding surviving example of basse taille enamel. It is one of only four known survivals done on gold, including both secular or religious pieces; another is the small Salting Reliquary, also in the British Museum. The "King John Cup" in King's Lynn, of ca. 1340, silver-gilt with transparent enamel, is the best example of basse-taille work probably made in England; the metalwork expert Herbert Maryon describes this and the Royal Gold Cup as the "two examples of outstanding merit, unsurpassed in any collection". However it is unclear whether most of the enamel at King's Lynn is original.

The technique was rediscovered in the 17th century, but was not much practiced thereafter. In a variant of the technique, translucent enamel was applied over a guilloché machine-turned metal backing by Peter Carl Fabergé on the Faberge eggs and other pieces from the 1880s until the Russian Revolution, and this technique is still used, usually in a single colour.

== 17th century ==
The revived technique was used in the 17th century for the covers and faces of pocket watches, gold boxes and similar items, but mostly with opaque enamel, achieving a rather different effect from medieval examples using translucent enamel. The French watchmaker Josias Jolly made frequent use of it.

== Technique ==
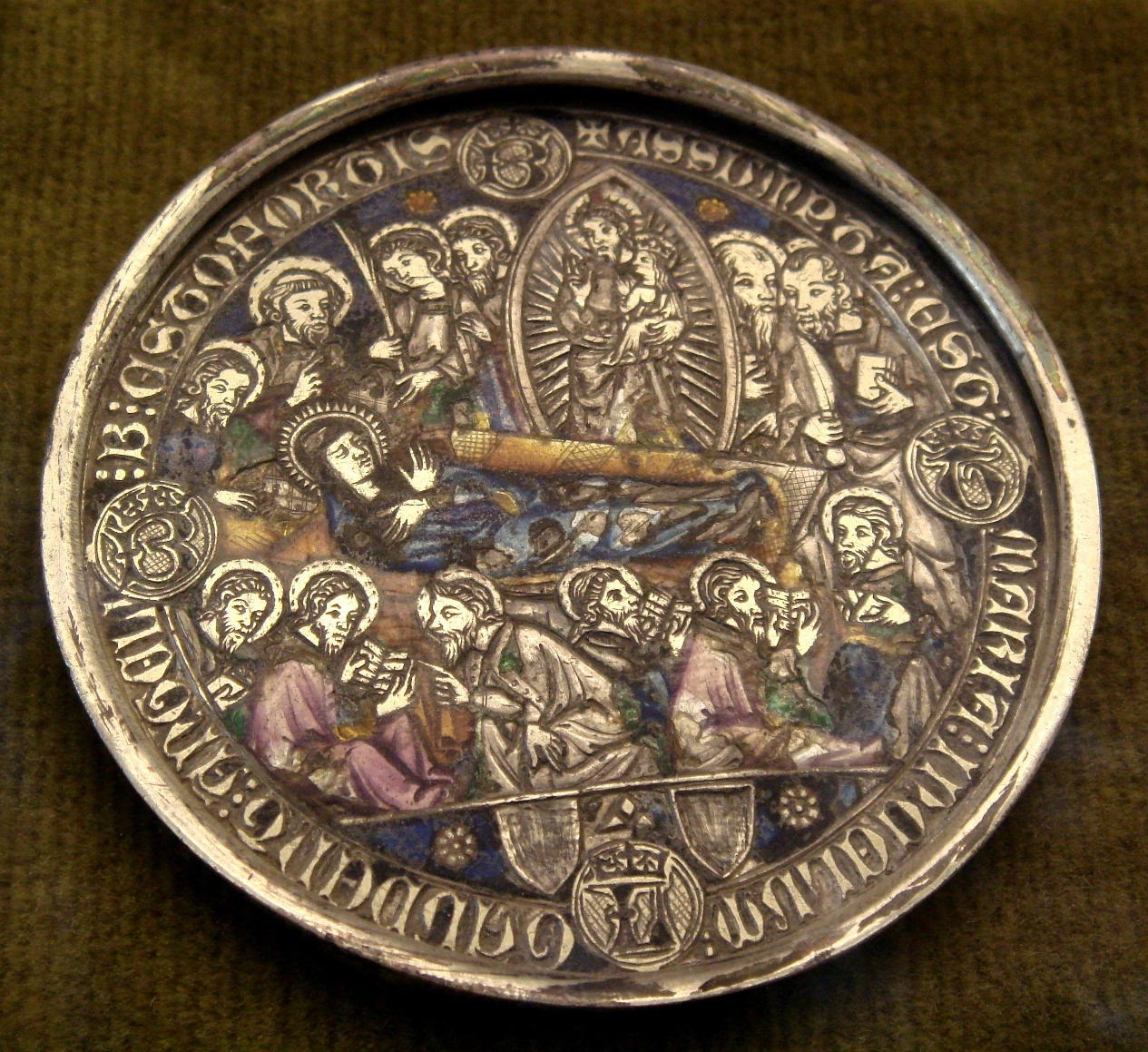
Medallion of the Death of the Virgin, with damaged basse-taille enamel

The process for creating basse-taille enamel began by marking the outline of the design and the main internal outlines on the gold with a tool called a "tracer". Then the interior area was worked, either with chasing tools, hammering and punching rather than cutting, or with chisels, to form a shallow recess to hold the enamel. The more important parts of the design were modelled by varying the depth of the surface to produce different intensities of colour when the translucent enamel was added; for example in the Royal Gold Cup the gold under folds of drapery often rises near the surface to create a paler highlight. In the example illustrated with Luke's ox, the lowest lobe shows tufts of grass formed by cutting deeper into the background. In many of the recessed areas, further decoration was added by either engraving or punching which would show through the translucent enamel, or to facet the background so the reflections change as the viewing angle changes slightly. Most background areas to the enamelled scenes were decorated in the same way. Finally the surfaces were cleaned up, made good and polished, perhaps including scraping off any bumps showing through on the reverse of the metal.

The enamel lies flush with the gold surfaces; it was a preparation of finely ground glass paste applied with great care to the prepared recessed areas, and then fired. When different colours of enamel meet each other with a neat boundary, this was achieved by firing one colour with a retaining border of gum tragacanth before adding the next. The difficulty was often increased by the application of tints of a different colour to a base shade of enamel before firing, so that the added colour blends gradually into the background colour around the edges of the tinted area. This is especially used on "flux", or colourless enamel, as in the ground areas, rocks and trees. In the Royal Gold Cup, flux was also used for flesh areas as on a gold background it darkens slightly when hard to a suitable colour for Northern-European skin. The rouge clair or "ruby glass" red, used so effectively here, was made by adding tiny particles of copper, silver and gold to the glass; here scientific tests have shown that copper was used. After firing, the enamel was polished flush with the surrounding metal, which was presumably decorated last.
