= Pace di Valentino =

Pace di Valentino (also known as Pacino; Pacino Orafo) was a Sienese goldsmith active from 1257 to 1296. Little is known about his early life, but he was probably born between 1230 and 1235. Though working chiefly in Siena, he also was established for a time in Pistoia, and received numerous commissions from different popes.

== Commissions ==
The first documented reference to Pace di Valentino is for two seals made in 1257. In 1265 he received two significant commissions: the first was for a large golden chalice ("calicem magnum di auro") weighing about 11 pounds and a corresponding paten, both of which are now lost; the second was for an elaborate gold-plated silver book cover. These were items not made for daily use, and having received these requests suggests that he was well known and well regarded in his field. Other notable works attributed to him include the chalice of San Atto made c. 1270, and numerous figures in the late 13th-century Altar of St. James found the Pistoia Cathedral. Some art historians suggest that he made the reliquary of San Galgano's head, now found in Siena's Museo dell'Opera del Duomo, although this is disputed by others. In addition, other extant documents indicate the details of his purchases of gold, silver, pearls, beads, and precious stones for use in his shop, as well as details of payments for works commissioned.

He was the first Sienese goldsmith to work for the papal court (under popes Nicholas III, Martin IV, Honorius IV, and Boniface VIII) and was actively working for Boniface VIII in the region of Montefiascone until at least 1296. He was influential on other goldsmiths of the following generation, including Guccio di Mannaia.

== Images ==
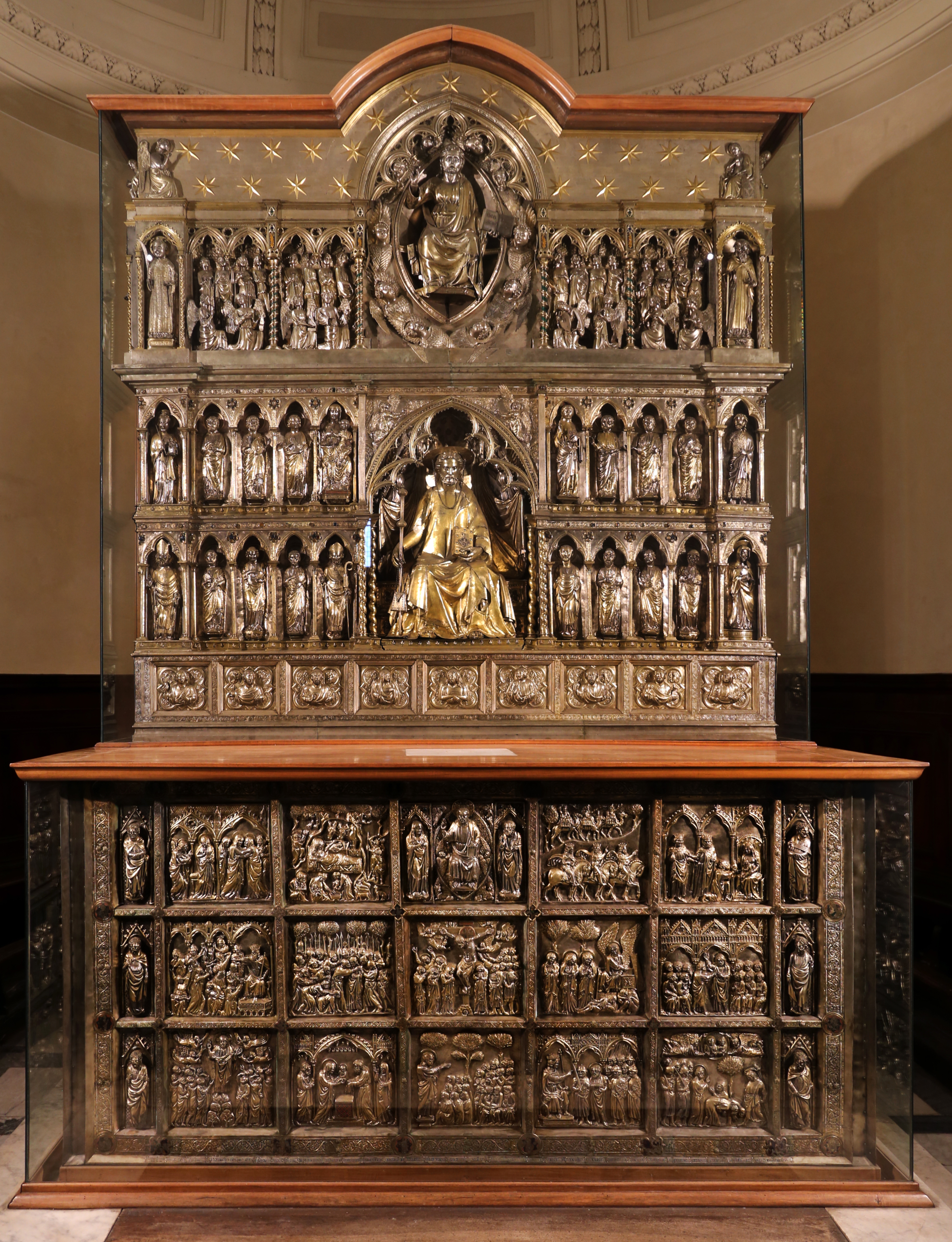
The Altar of St. James in the Pistoia Cathedral

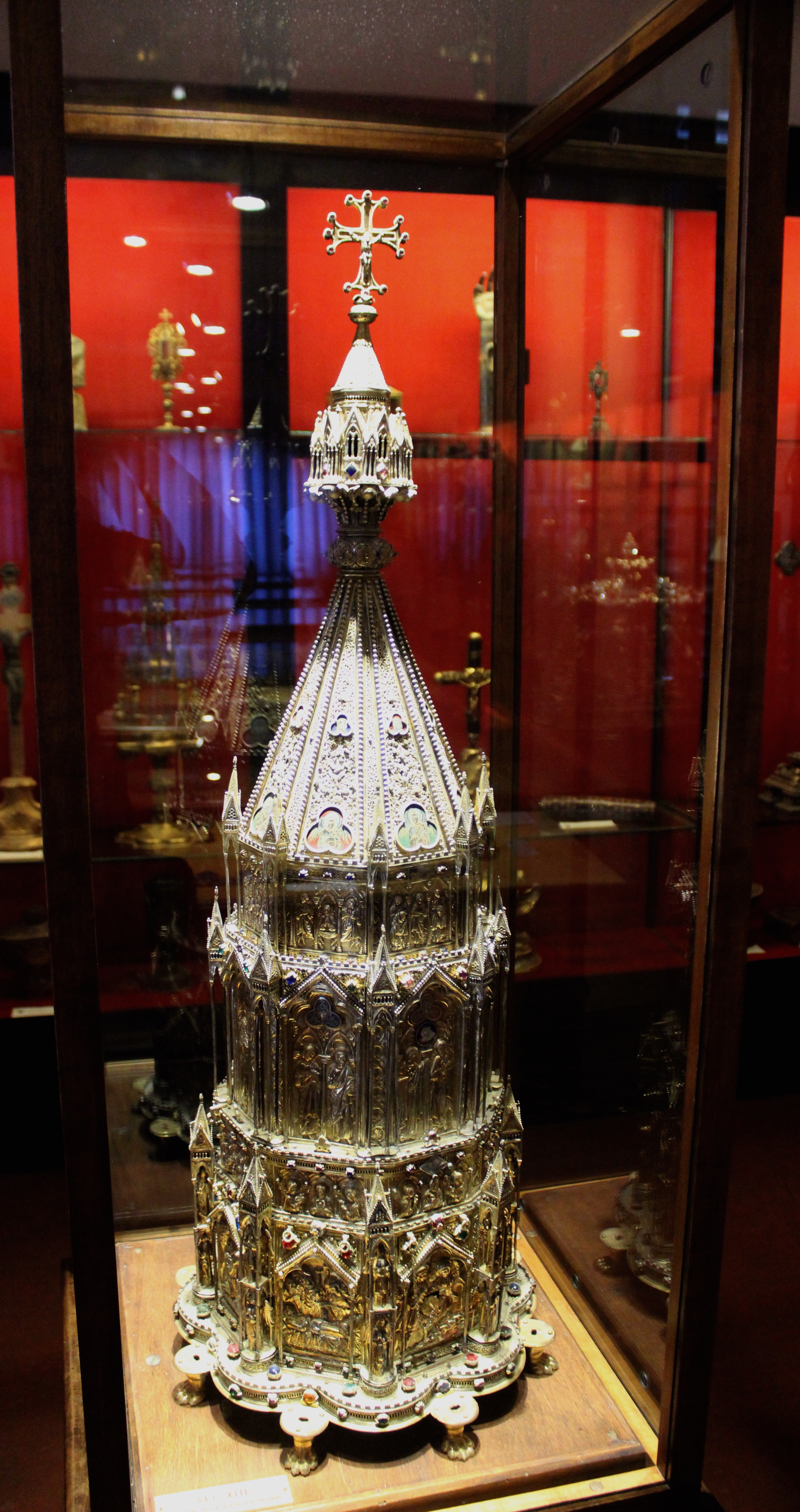
Reliquary of the head of San Galgano

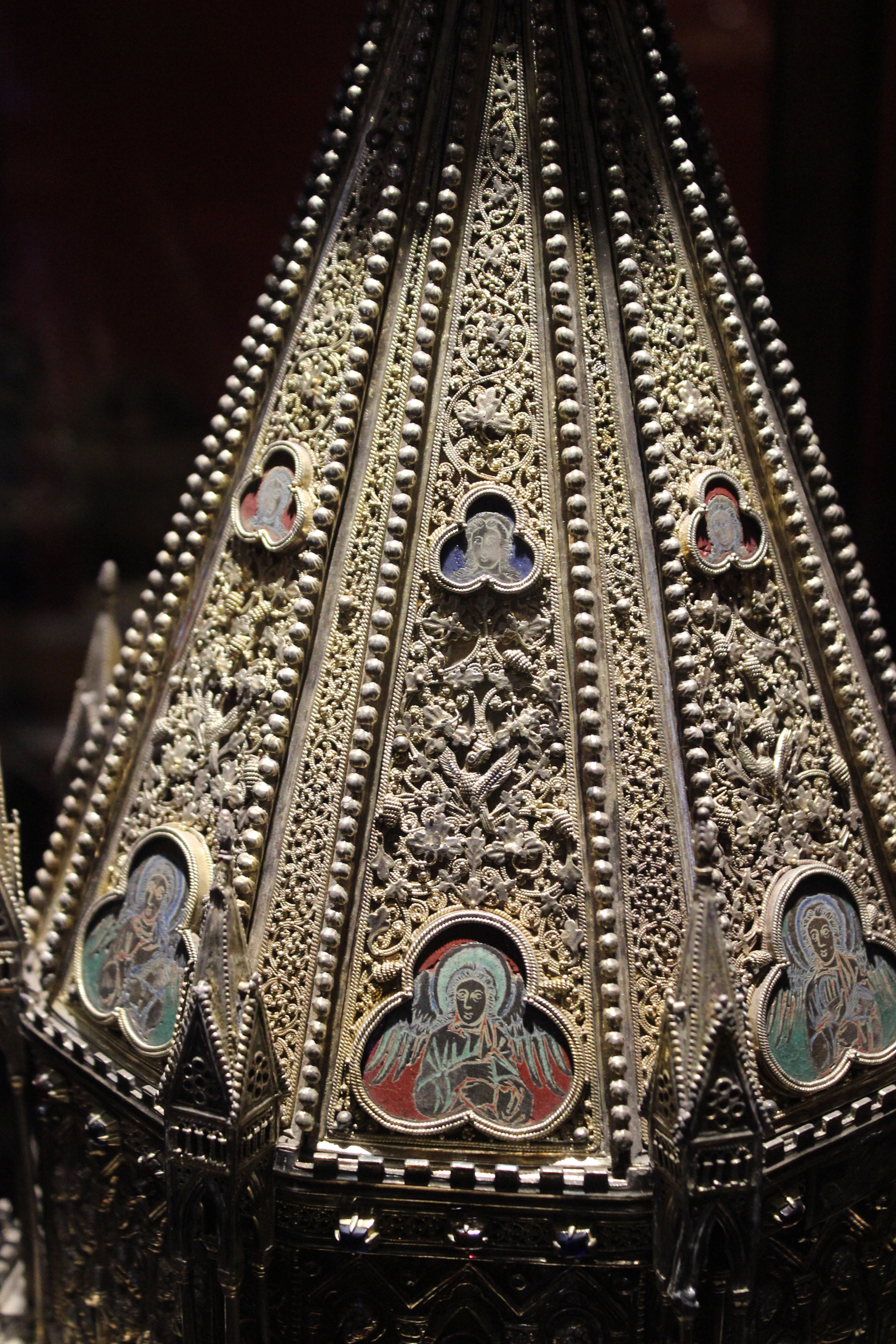
Reliquary of the head of San Galgano (detail)

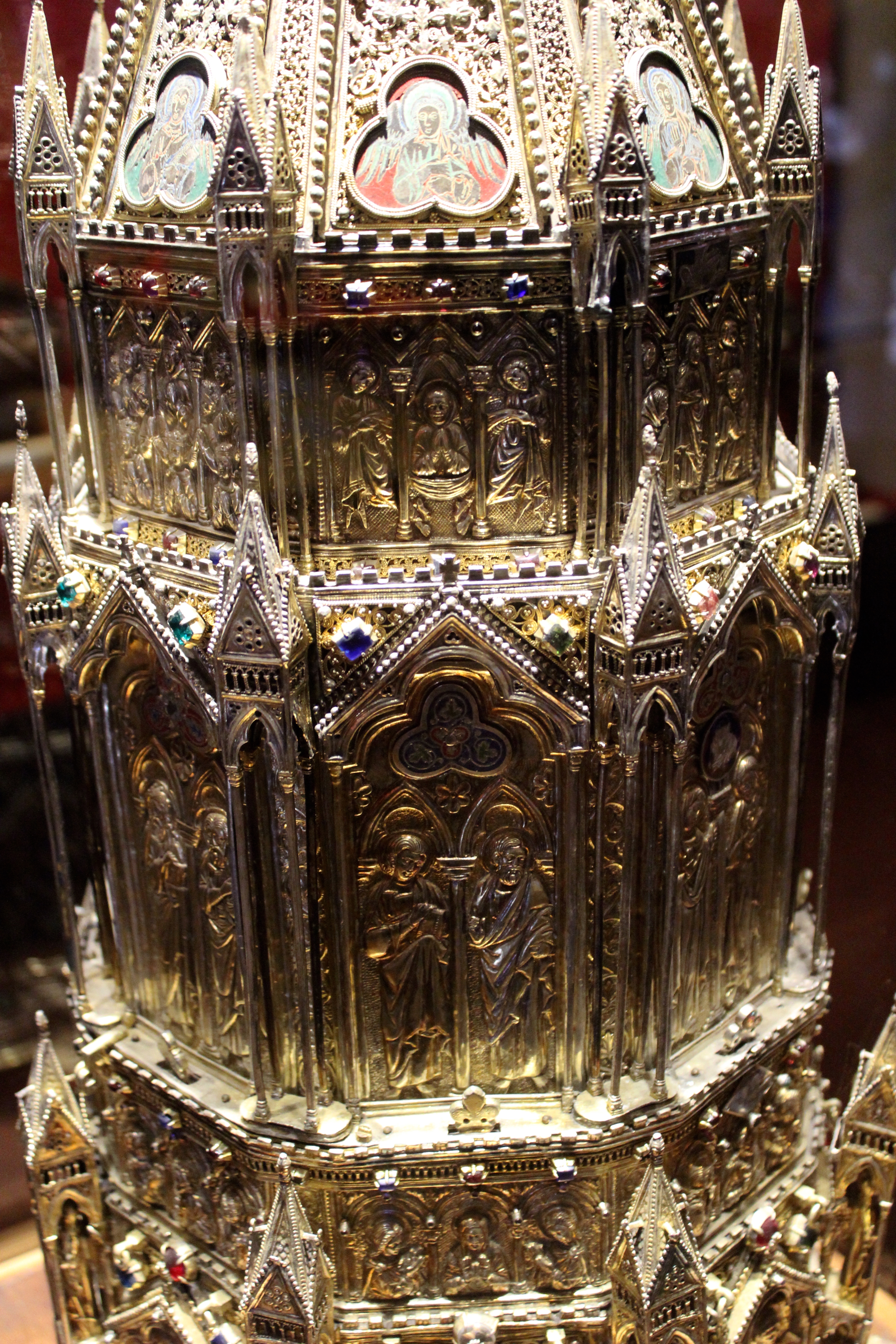
Reliquary of the head of San Galgano (detail)
