= Treasure Museum of the Basilica of Saint Francis in Assisi =

Italian museum of Christian religious art

Coordinates: 43°04′28.31″N 12°36′21.11″E

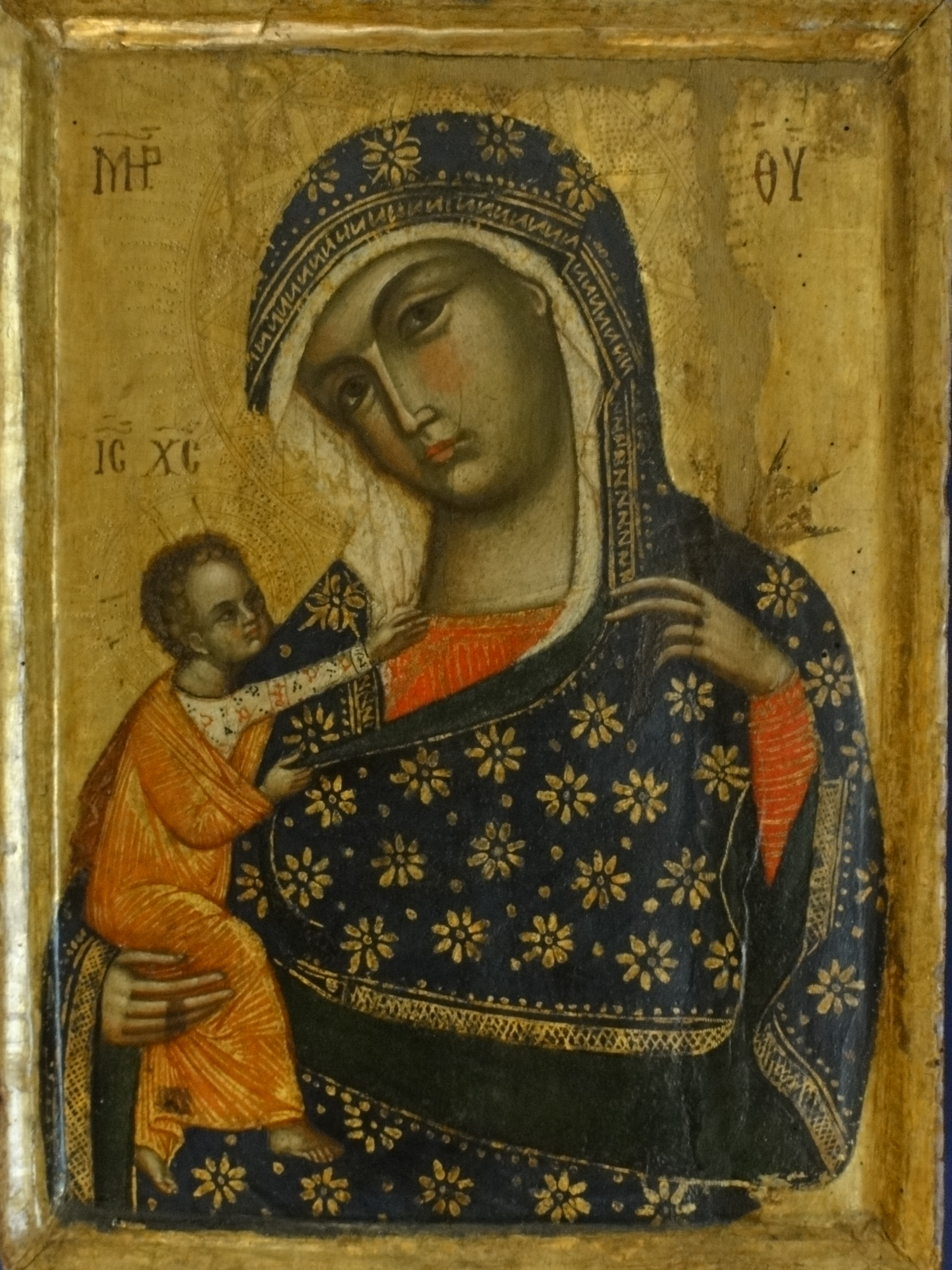
14th century Venetian Madonna and child found in the Treasure Museum

The Treasure Museum of the Basilica of Saint Francis contains a collection of sacred art that is on display in two halls found on the northern side of the Cloister of Pope Sixtus IV which is part of the Sacro Convento in Assisi, Italy. The entrance is found on the second level of the Renaissance cloister behind the apse of the Basilica of Saint Francis, which houses the remains of St. Francis of Assisi. Since 1986 the museum has also displayed a collection of works donated to the Conventual Franciscan Friars by the Secular Franciscan and American art critic, Frederick Mason Perkins, who died in Assisi in October 1955.

The museum is part of the Associazione Musei Ecclesiastici Italiani (AMEI) and the network Museale Ecclesiastica Umbra (MEU).

== History ==
In 1930, three years after the return of the basilica and the Sacred Convent to the friars, the first exposition of the treasure was put on display in the hall of Pope Pius XI at the western end of complex. The exhibition was designed to honor the works of the original patrimony which survived not only the ravages of time, but especially the plundering by Napoleon's troops (in 1798 nearly 390 kilograms of vestments in silver and other valuables were stolen). These works also survived the suppression of religious orders in 1866 during Italy's unification, when in any case the room in which the treasure was kept, at the bottom of the bell tower, was already in a dilapidated state.

From documents found in the archives, especially from the old sacristy inventories (the first of which was taken in 1338), we can learn something about the evolution of the collection. But other sources also testify to the Treasure's development: the first biographies of St. Francis attest, for example, that in 1230 on occasion of the translation of Francis's body to the new church dedicated to him, Pope Gregory IX sent as a gift "a gold cross studded with precious stones in which is set a relic of the wood of the true cross. And with it decorative objects, liturgical objects and other objects to be used for serving at the altar, and extremely precious and magnificent sacred vestments."

As many other gifts amassed during these early decades, their necessary care created various difficulties and also caused the followers of St. Francis (known as "il Poverello"), to have some misgivings. So in 1253, to resolve these conflicts, Pope Innocent IV intervened with this bull "Dignum Extimamus" recognizing that the friars were permitted use of these gifts but were not their owners, just as was the case for the entire sanctuary complex as directed by the Apostolic See. At the same time, he forbid the removal of any of these objects from the basilica. This was reaffirmed by Pope Clement X in 1703.

== Site ==
It's essential that the treasure's exposition be considered within the context of the monumental complex, made up by the basilica and the Sacred Convent, that constitutes the original location for which the treasure was formed and for which some works were in fact specifically made. The rooms in which the museum is found today were part of the original construction of 1228, made at the bidding of Pope Gregory IX to the community of friars. This area would certainly have been used even if for short stays by the Pope who had put the entire complex under his immediate jurisdiction.

In 1756 this area, sitting directly over the old dormitory (now known as the Sala Romanica), underwent heavy reconstruction in the Neo-gothic style, which is why it is today known as the Gothic Hall. It is precisely in this room that from 1977 the treasure has been on view, while in the adjoining room, towards the so-called Papal Hall (the first site of the museum), is the Sala Rossa, or Red Hall, in which since 1986 the F. M. Perkins Collection has been on display.

The current arrangement of the works dates from the year 2000 when the museum was reopened after extensive repairs were made to the structural damage caused by the earthquake of September 1997.

== Works ==
The collection contains for the most part works of the so-called minor arts, although it does contain some sculpture and paintings. Among that which has survived from the very start of the collection, we find clear testimony of the Treasure's international character in works of French origin (like the illuminated manuscripts from Paris from the middle of the 13th century; gold and silver metalwork, among which is the magnificent reliquary of the Seamless Garment as well as the reliquary of the thorn from the Crown of Thorns in classic Parigian gothic style from the second half of the 12th century; and also an elegant Madonna and Child in ivory, also in the purest French gothic of the 14th century), of Flemish origin (the tapestry of Pope Sixtus IV and a few ivory carvings), and of Germanic origin (the clock donated in 1701 by the Austrian Emperor Leopold I to Fr. Vincenzo Coronelli, and a few precious metal works from Salzburg).

Gold and silver metalwork predominates: the reliquaries come in various forms and styles, and are from various places and times. Some are distinguished by their uniqueness, for example, those of Saint Andrew (13th century) and Saint Ursula (14th century), decorated with gilded and engraved glass. Among the altar vessels are a number of chalices, from different epochs, of which the most celebrated is surely that of gold-plated silver and enamels made by Guccio di Mannaia and gift of Pope Nicholas IV, the first Franciscan pope, who reigned from 1288 to 1292.

Also on display are: two rare Sicilian silk dossals from the beginning of the 13th century, works of Venetian glass (a crystal cross with miniatures from the early 14th century), and a number of painted works among which is the processional cross, painted on both sides, by the Master of the Blue Crucifix (late 13th century), and two altar panels by Tiberio di Assisi and Lo Spagna, both working at the end of the 15th and beginning of the 16th centuries. Among the textiles deserving special mention is the Florentine altar-frontal which was based on a drawing by Antonio del Pollaiuolo and donated to the basilica by Pope Sixtus IV in (perhaps?) 1478 on the occasion of the 250th anniversary of the canonization of Saint Francis.

== The Frederick Mason Perkins Collection ==
In the second half of the 20th century, the Perkins Collection, made up of 56 paintings and a sculpture spanning the 14th to the 16th century, was donated to the museum. The collection contains, to name only a few items, a portrait of Saint Francis by Beato Angelico, a Madonna and Child by Garofalo, two panel paintings by Giovanni di Paolo and three by Pietro Lorenzetti, a Saint Sebastian by dell’Ortolano and a Saint Christopher by Sassetta.

== Exposition ==
=== The Treasure (found in the Sala Gotica) ===
==== Painted works ====
- Saint Francis and four miracles (Foto) (second third of the 13th century) by the Master of the Saint Francis Treasure.
- Crucifix (Foto) (second third of the 13th century), tempera on wood by the Master of the Blue Crucifixs or of the Azure Crosses.
- The prophet Isaiah (Foto) (third quarter of the 13th century), tempera on wood by the Master of Saint Francis.
- The Creator (Foto) (late 13th century), preparatory drawing (sinopia), terra rossa on plaster, attributed to Jacopo Torriti.
- Saint Martin cutting his mantle (c. 1317), preparatory drawing (sinopia), terra rossa on plaster, by Simone Martini.
- The Virgin with Child (Foto) (second quarter of the 14th century), tempera on wood by the Master of the Sterbini diptych.
- The Holy Face (Foto) (c.1450), ink and tempera on parchment mounted on wood, attributed to Benozzo Gozzoli
- Processional standard (c. 1427), painted wood, from Umbria.
- Processional cross painted on both sides (first half of the 16th century), oil on wood by the Umbrian Master
- Madonna with child and saints Catherine of Alexandria, Francis, Elisabeth of Hungary, blessed [...], Clare and King Louis IX of France (Foto) (1516) by Lo Spagna.
- Christ crucified between angels and saints Leonard, Anthony the Abbot, Francis and Clare (Foto) (early 16th century) by Tiberio d'Assisi.

==== Manuscripts ====
- The Missal, said to be of Saint Louis IX (middle of the 13th century); French gothic script on sheepskin
- The book of the Epistles (third quarter of the 13th century); French gothic script on sheepskin
- The book of the Gospels (middle of the 13th century); French gothic script on sheepskin

==== Textiles ====
- The Franciscan Tree (Foto) (1471-1482), tapestry in wool and silk, of Flemish origin.
- Altar-frontal of Pope Sixtus IV (15th century), of Florentine origin based on a design attributed to Antonio del Pollaiuolo.
- Mitre (end of the 16th century), silk, silk polychrome thread, gems, pearls and silver rings, of Tuscan origin.

==== Reliquaries ====
- Reliquary of the Seamless Garment (end of the 13th or beginning of the 14th century), silver cast and gold-plated, embossed, from Paris.
- Relic of the finger of Saint Andrew (c. 1278 - c. 1281), gold-plated silver, engraved and etched, rock crystal, red granite (?), from Rome.
- Reliquary of Saint Ursula, previously containing the tunic of Saint Francis (from the middle of the 13th to the middle of the 14th centuries), gold-plated and embossed copper, gold-plated glass, rock crystal and precious stones, champlevé enamels, from Umbria.
- Reliquary of the thorn of the crown of thorns (c. 1260- c.1270), silver, partly gold-plated, embossed, rock crystal, from Paris.
- Reliquary of the hair of Saint Catherine (middle of the 14th century), cast silver, ivory and pearls, from France.
- Reliquary of a stone from the Holy Sepulcher (13th century), from the Umbria-Venice school

==== Chalices ====
- Chalice of Pope Nicholas IV (13th century), gold-plated silver cast using the lost wax method and embossed, includes 80 translucent enamels; by Guccio di Mannaia (documented from 1291 to 1318).

==== Sculpture ====
- Processional cross (about the middle of the 13th century), gold-plated and embossed copper, over a form of wood, from Umbria/Lazio.
- Madonna with Child (13th century), wood, from the Umbrian master.
- Madonna with Child (14th century), painted ivory, from France.
- Hand-held cross (15th century), carved olive wood, of Byzantine origin.
- Benediction cross (14th century), wood filigree, gold and silver, enamels, coral and pearls, hard stones, of Byzantine origini (Mount Athos?).

=== The Perkins Collection (found in the Sala Rossa) ===
- Madonna with the child Jesus (c. 1340) by Pietro Lorenzetti.
- Madonna with the child Jesus (14th century) by the Master of the Sterbini Diptych
- Madonna with the child Jesus and saints (14th century), from the Venetian school
- Madonna and child by Masolino da Panicale
- Madonna of Humility (14th century) by Giovanni di Nicola da Pisa.
- Saint Lawrence (14th–15th centuries) by the Maestro del Bambino Vispo.
- Saint Margaret of Antioch (14th century) by Pietro Lorenzetti.
- Saint Paul (14th century) from the school of Pietro Lorenzetti.
- Baby Jesus (second half of the 15th century) by Pseudo Pier Francesco Fiorentino.
- Madonna with the child Jesus and adorers (15th century).
- Triptych (second half of the 15th century) by Gentile da Fabriano.
- Madonna with the child Jesus and two angels (c. 1423) by Lorenzo Monaco.
- Saint Christopher (c. 1440) by Sassetta.
- Saint Sebastian (middle of the first decade of the 16th century) by dell'Ortolano.
- Saint Bernardine (c. 1460) by Sano di Pietro.
- Madonna and child (first decade of the 16th century) by Garofalo.
- Portrait of Frederick and Irene Perkins (Foto) (first half of the 20th century), by Nicola D'Asnasch (1872-1960).

== Gallery of Images ==
=== Treasure ===
==== Paintings ====
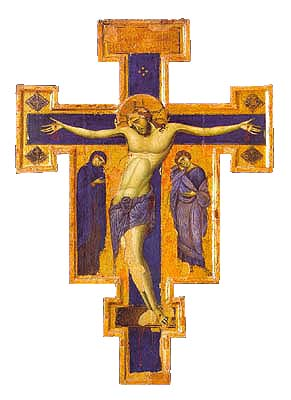
Christ Suffering, Master of the Blue Crucifix (13th century)

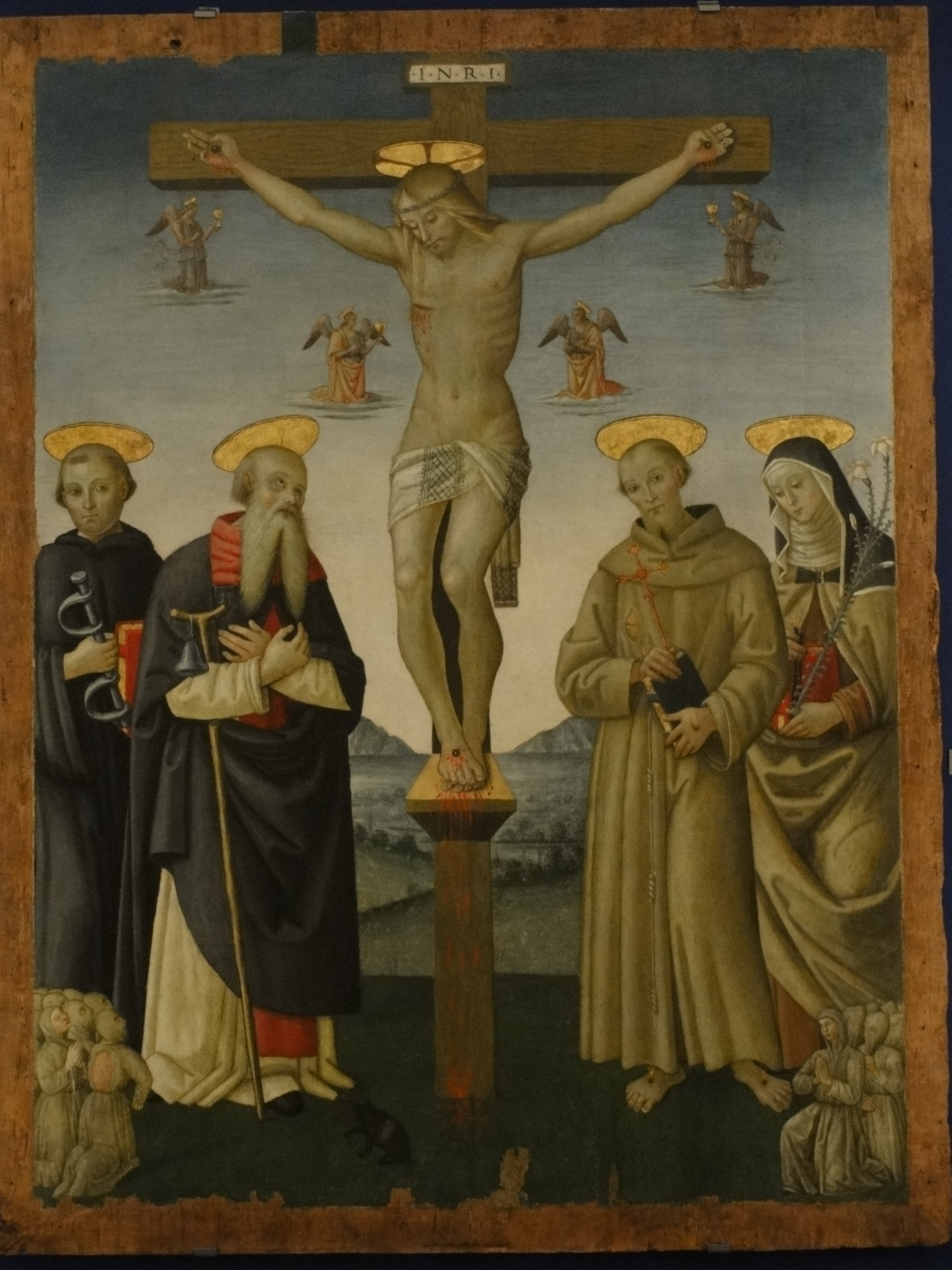
Crucifixion with Saints Leonard, Anthony, Francis and Clare, Tiberio di Assisi (1506)

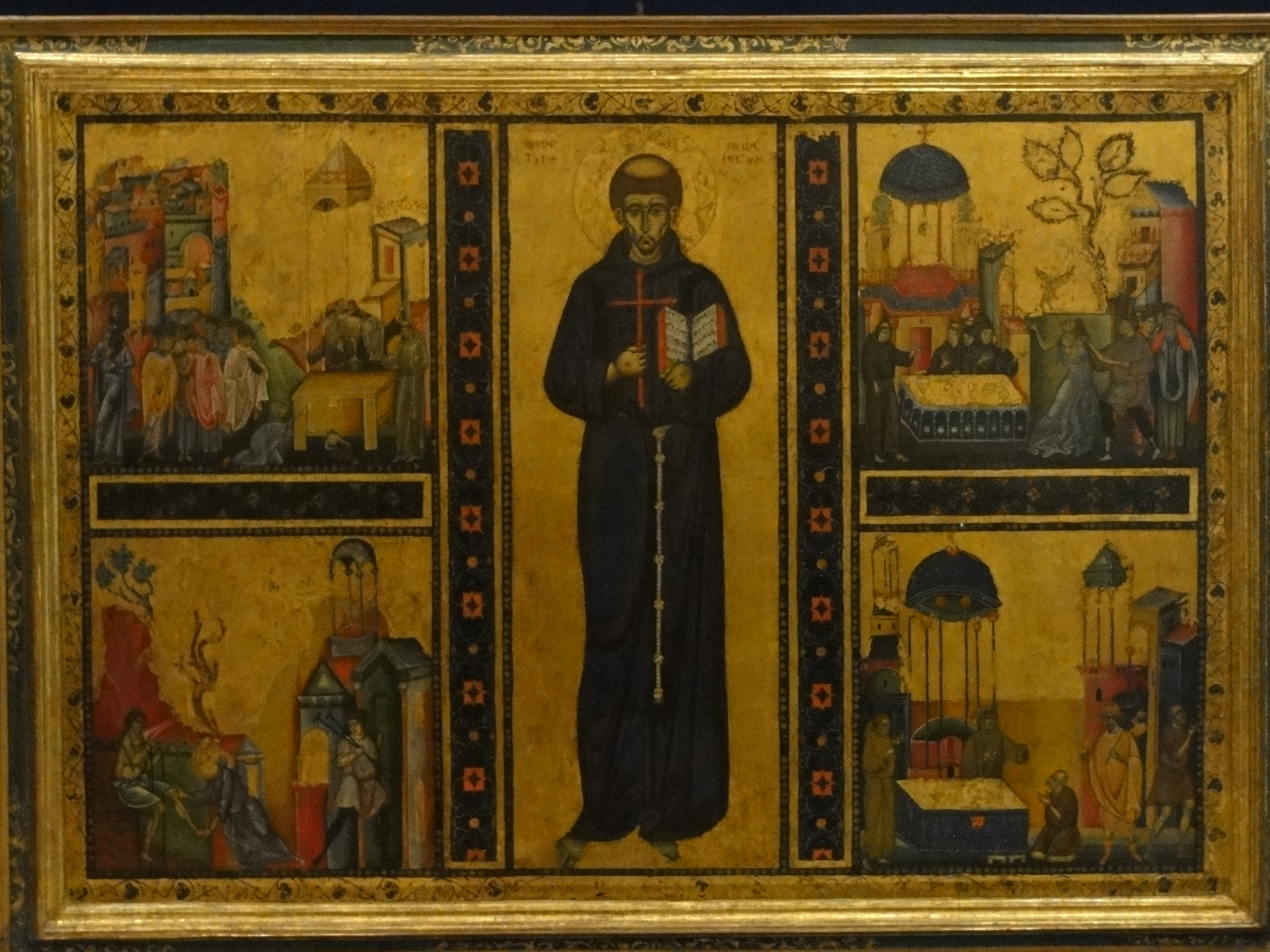
Saint Francis and four miracles, Byzantine-Romanesque Master (1265–75)

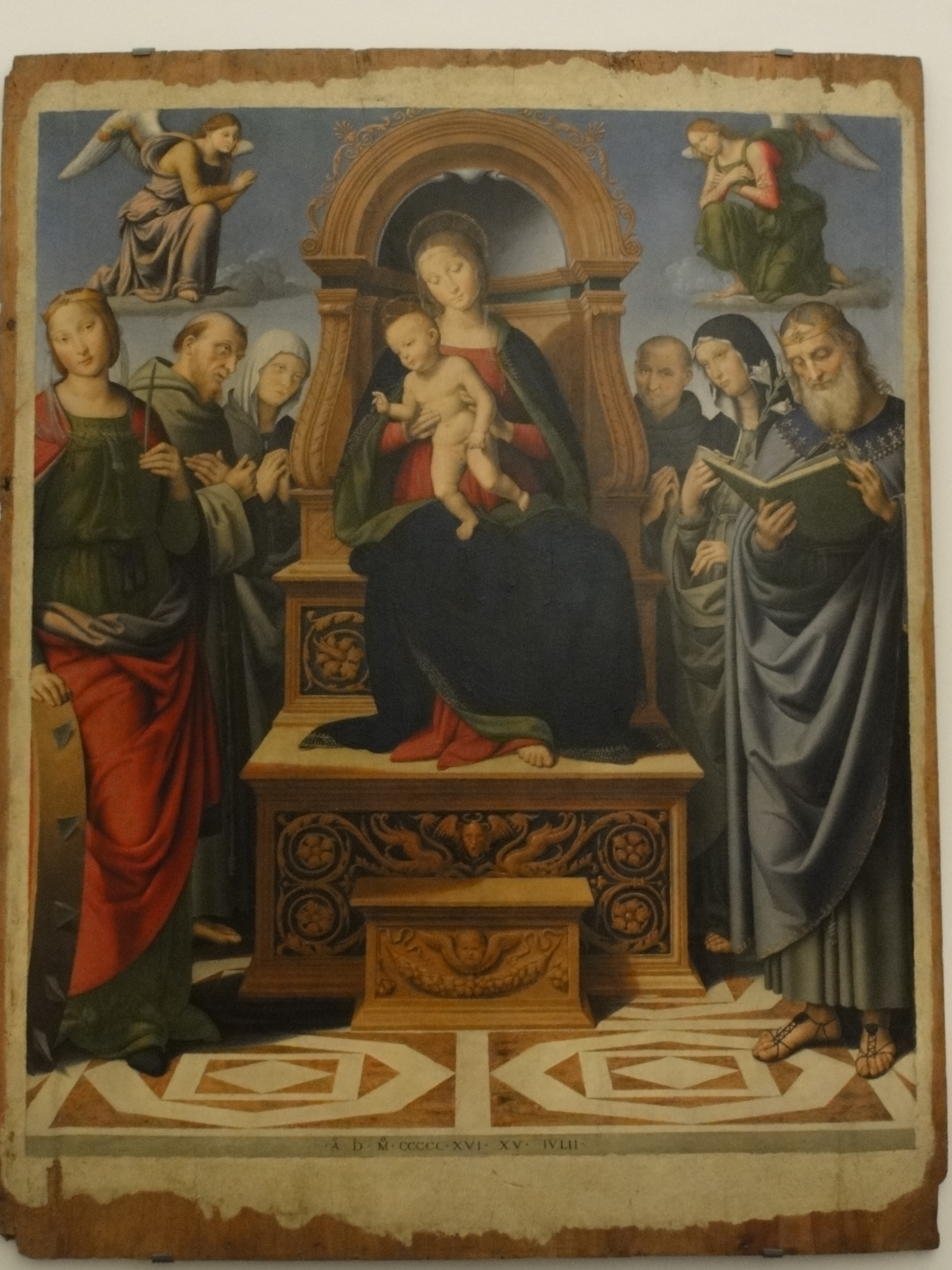
Madonna and child with saints and angels, Giovanni di Pietro (1516)

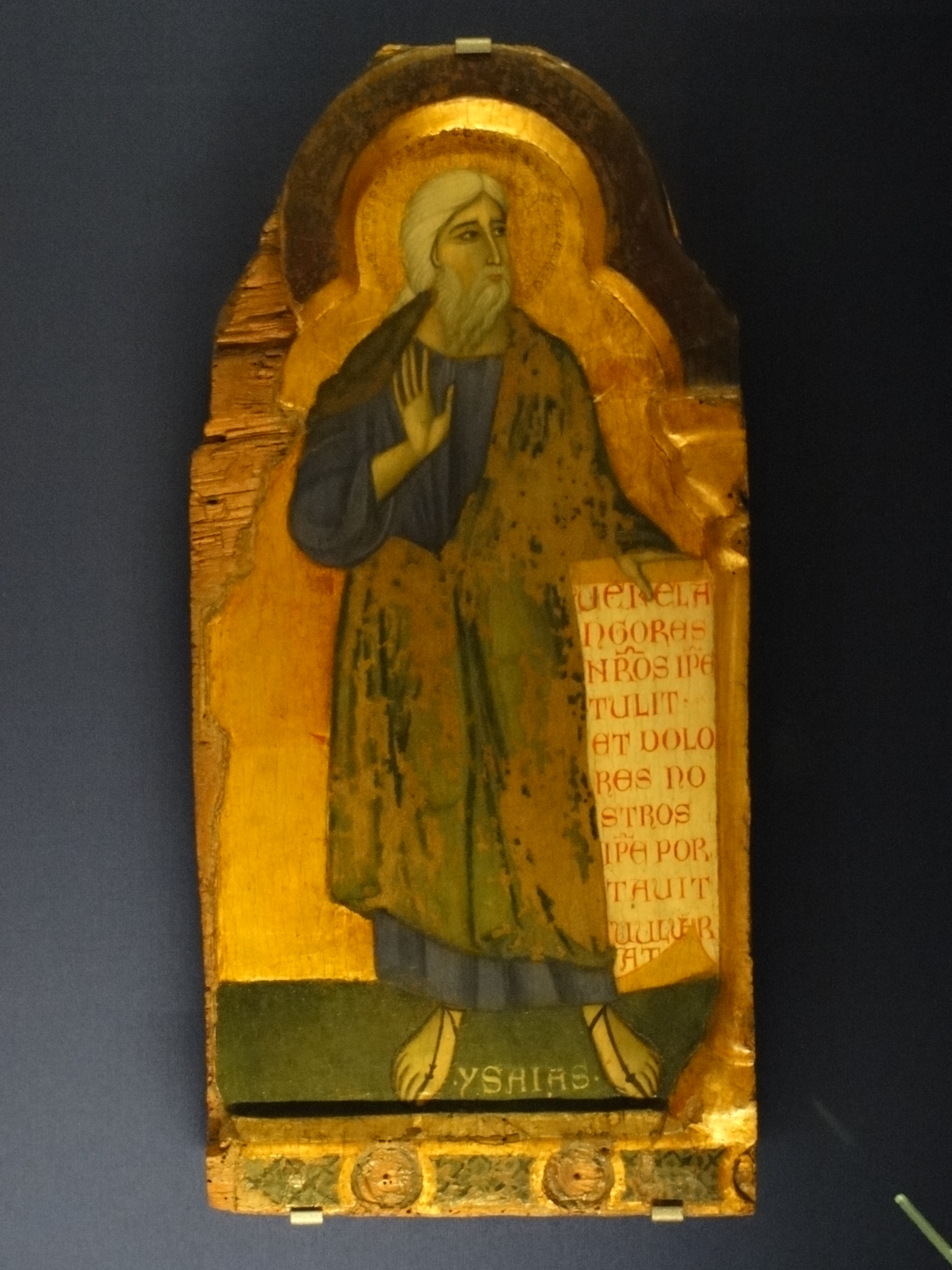
The Prophet Isaiah, Master of Saint Francis (13th century)

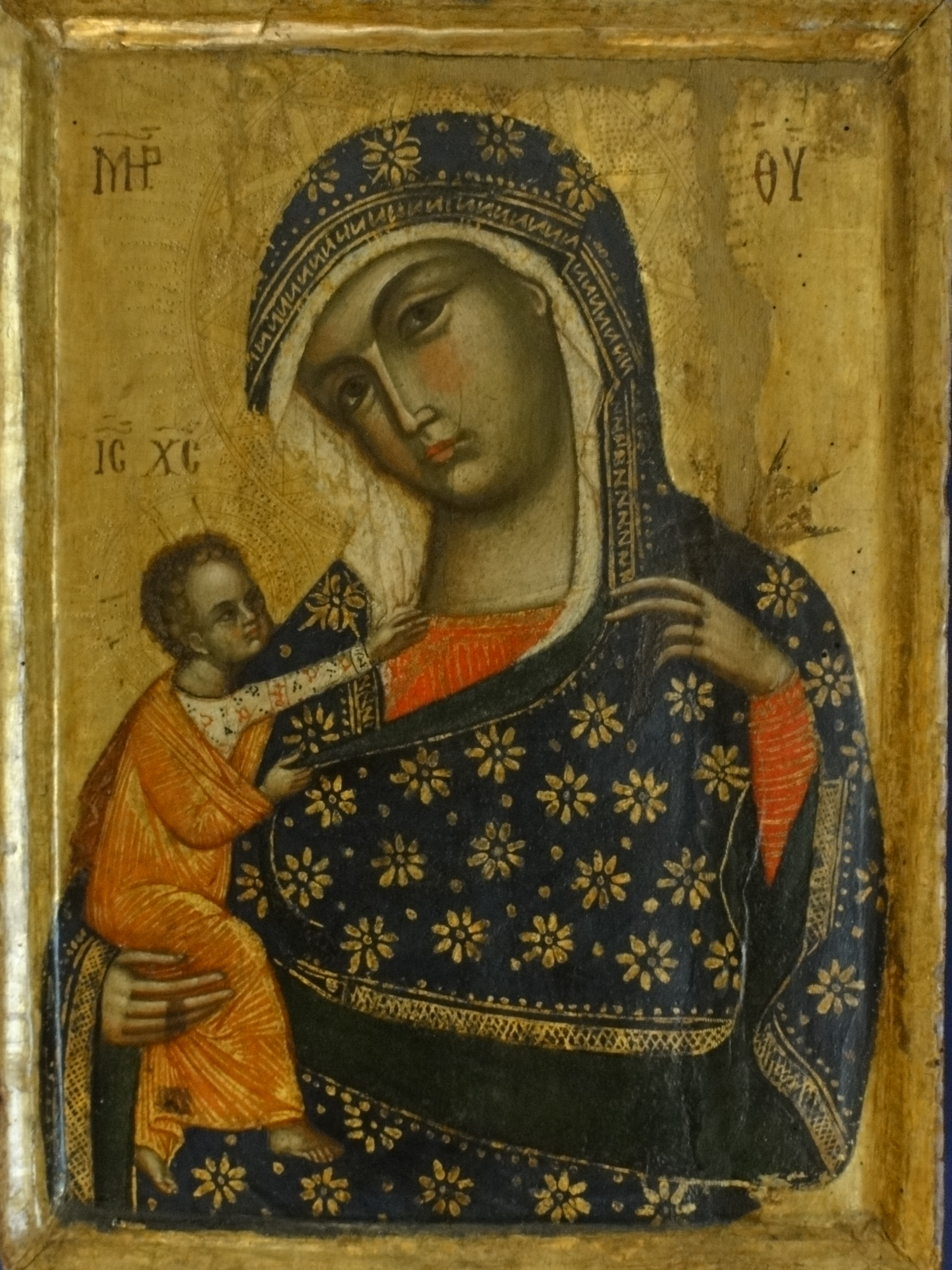
Madonna with Child, Greco-Venetian Master (14th century)

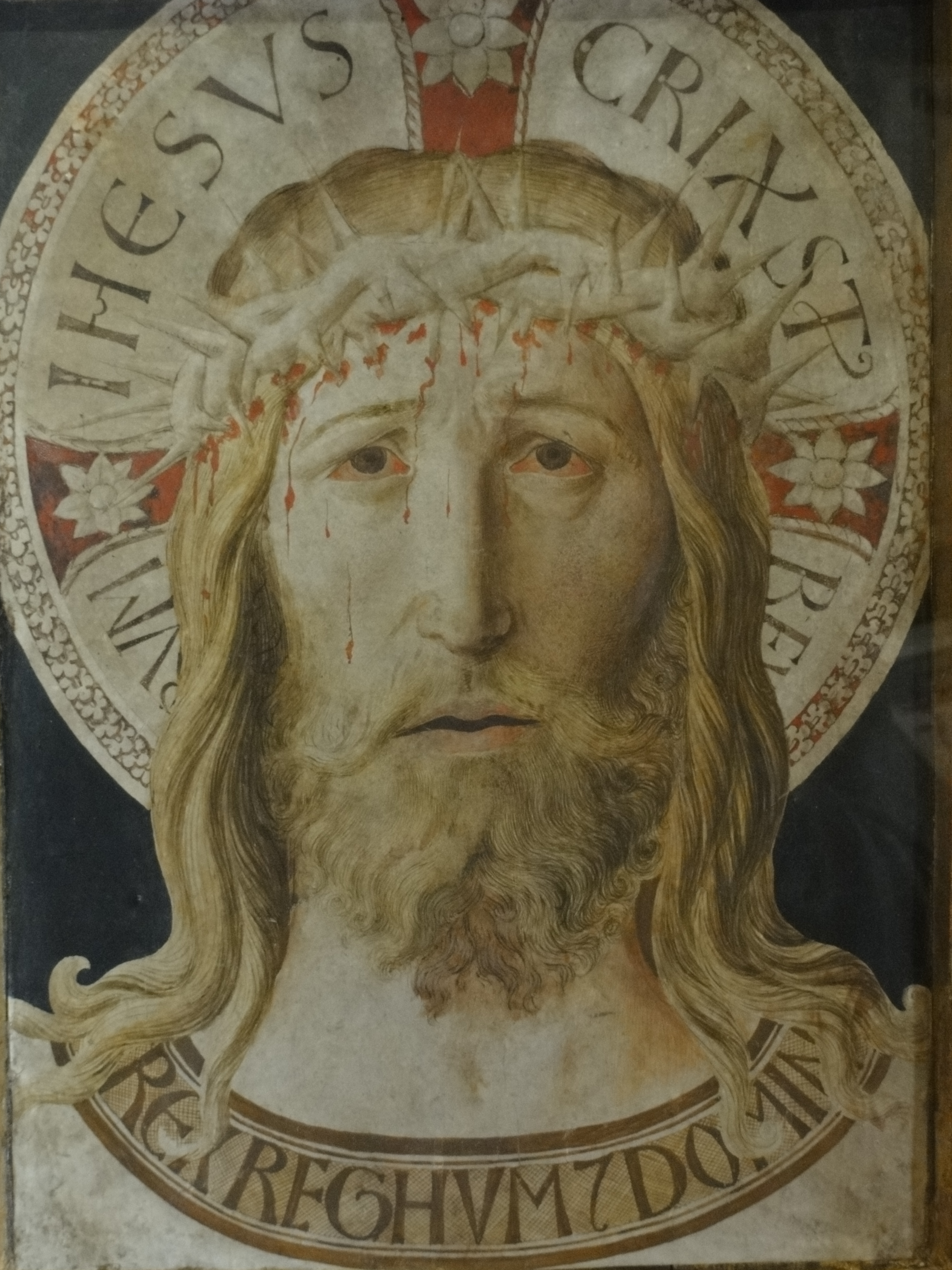
The Holy Face, Benozzo Gozzoli (15th century)

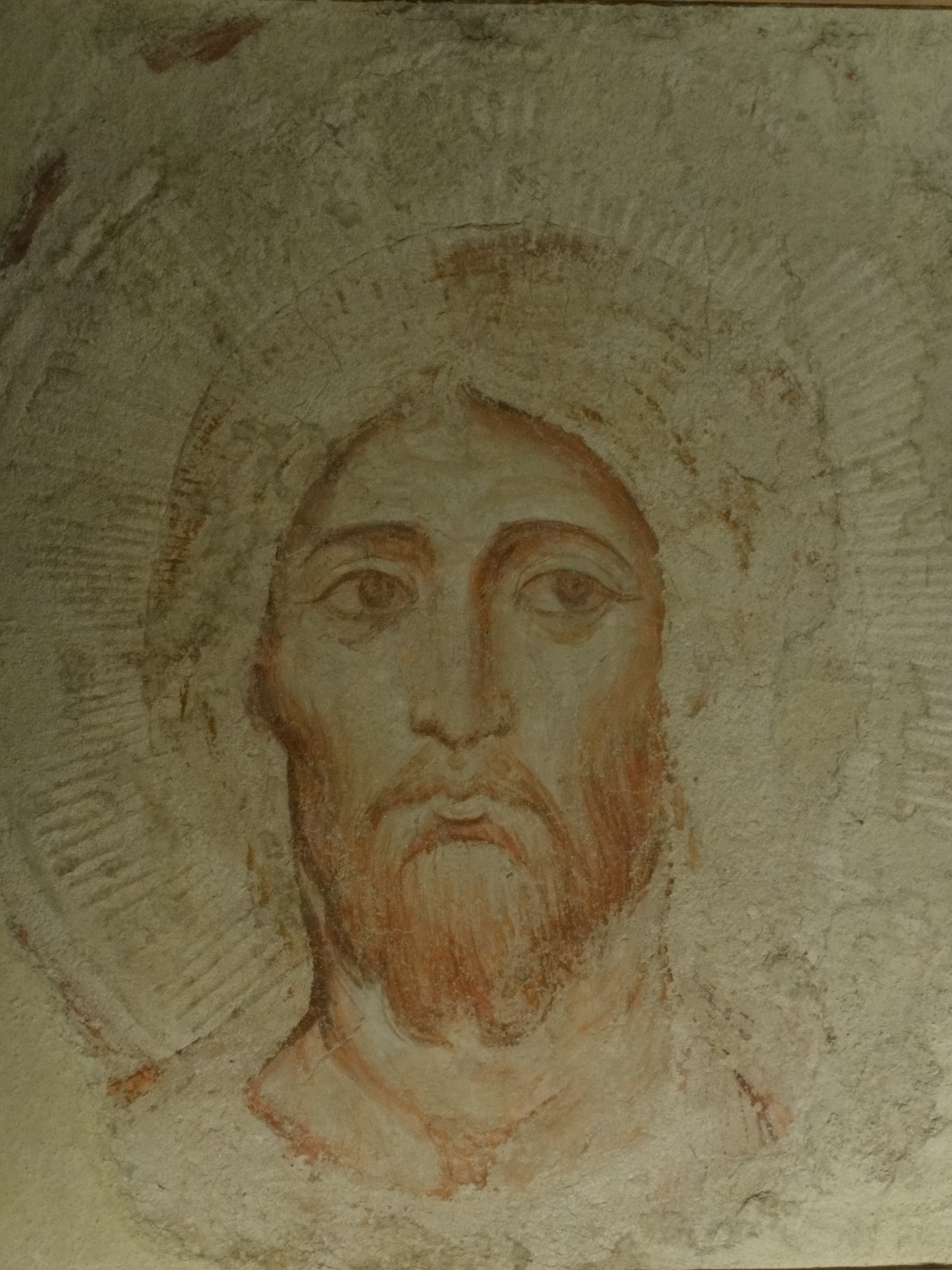
Face of the Creator, Jacopo Torriti (c. 1290)

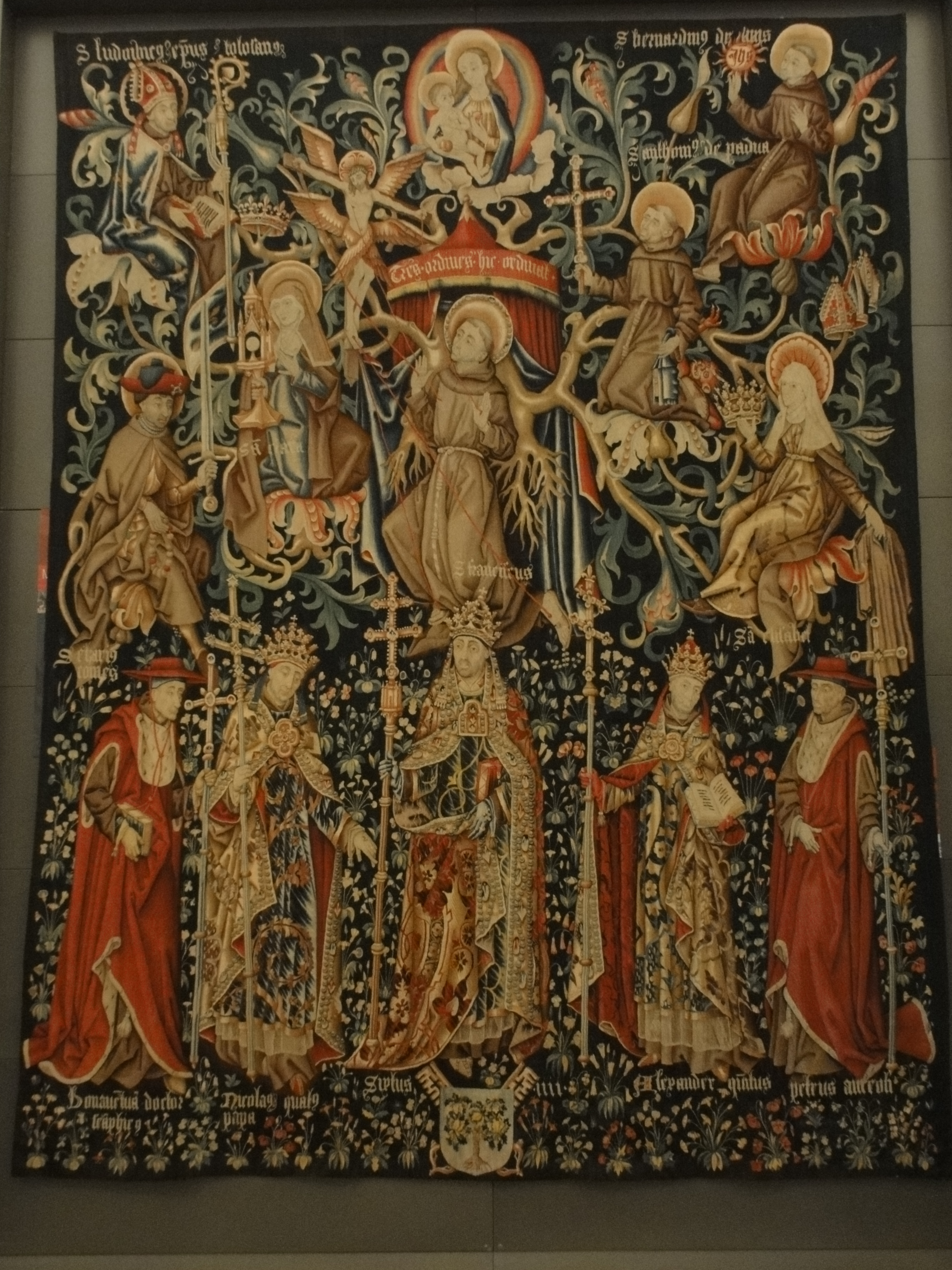
Tapestry of Sixtus IV (c. 1478)

=== Perkins Collection ===
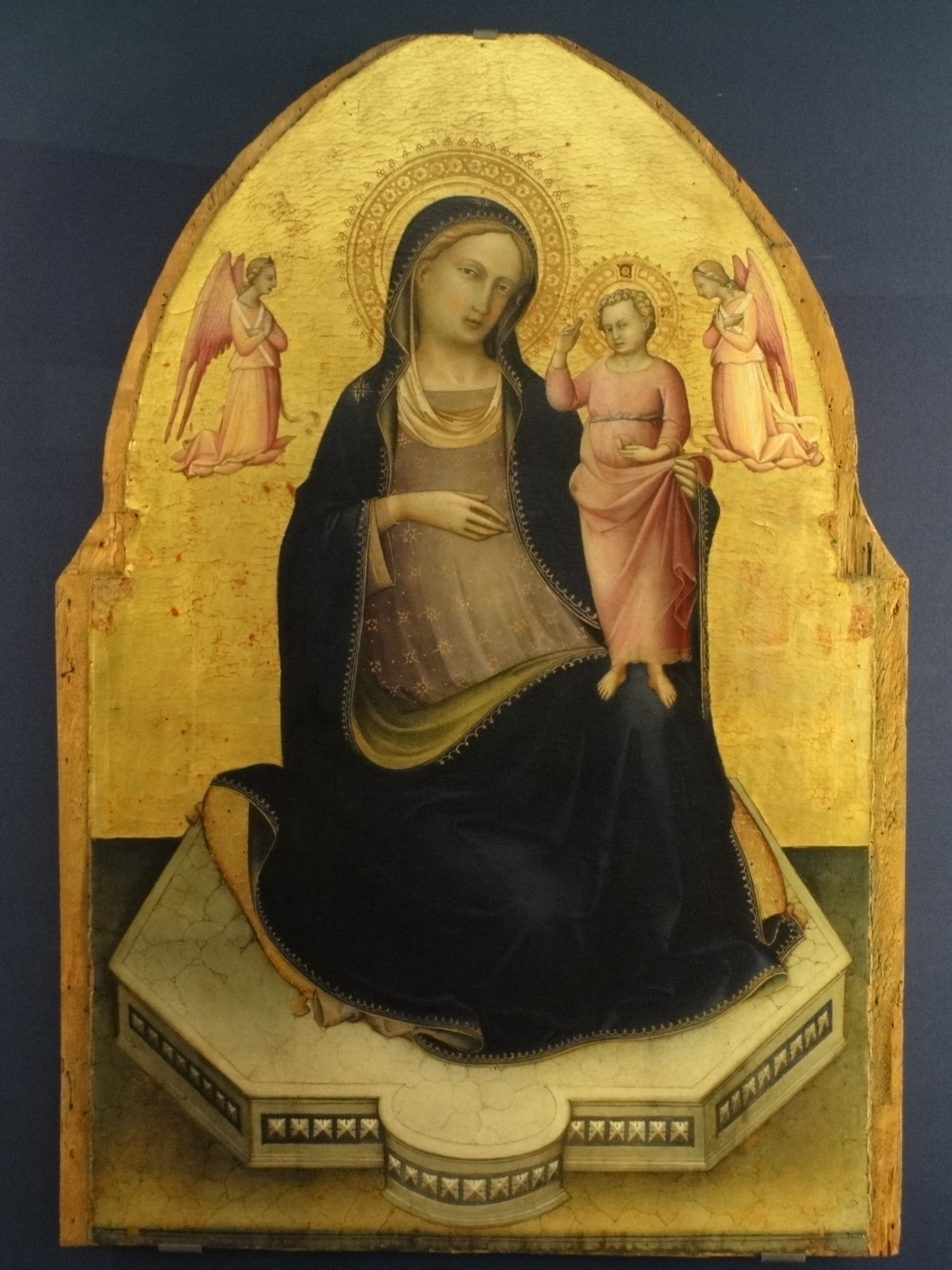
Madonna of Humility, by Lorenzo Monaco (1370–1425)

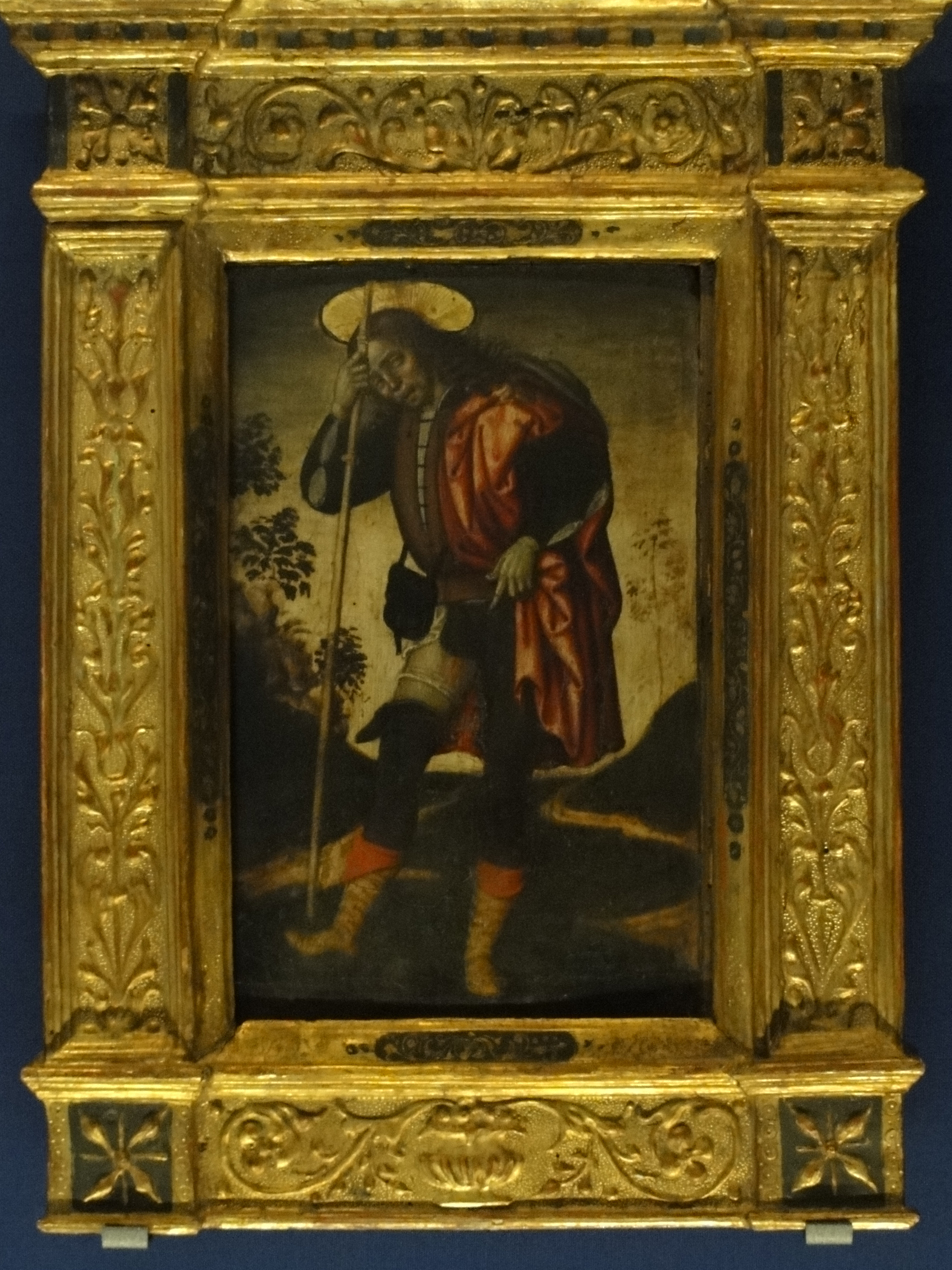
Saint Rock, by Niccolò Liberatore, also known as l'Alunno (1430–1502)

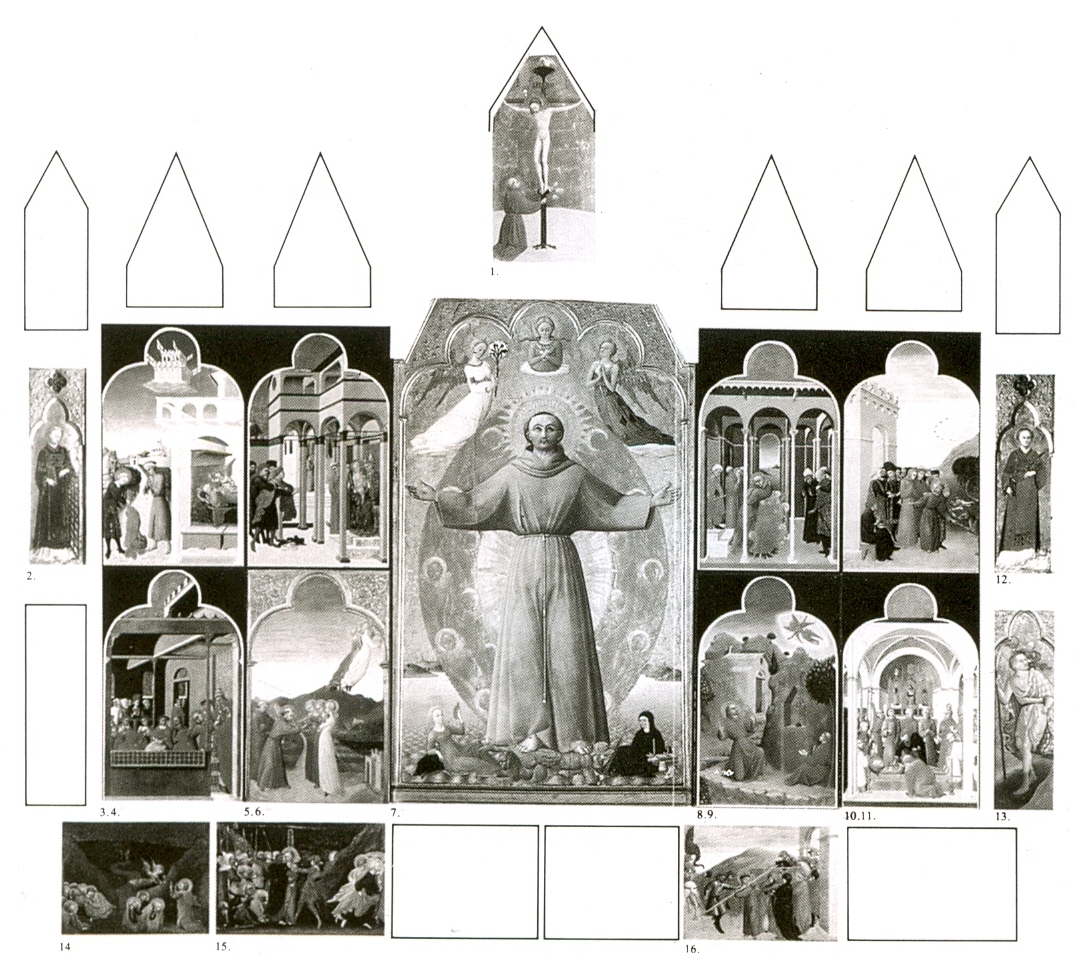
Reconstruction of the altar panel by Sassetta (1437-1444) with the Saint Christopher (fig. 13)

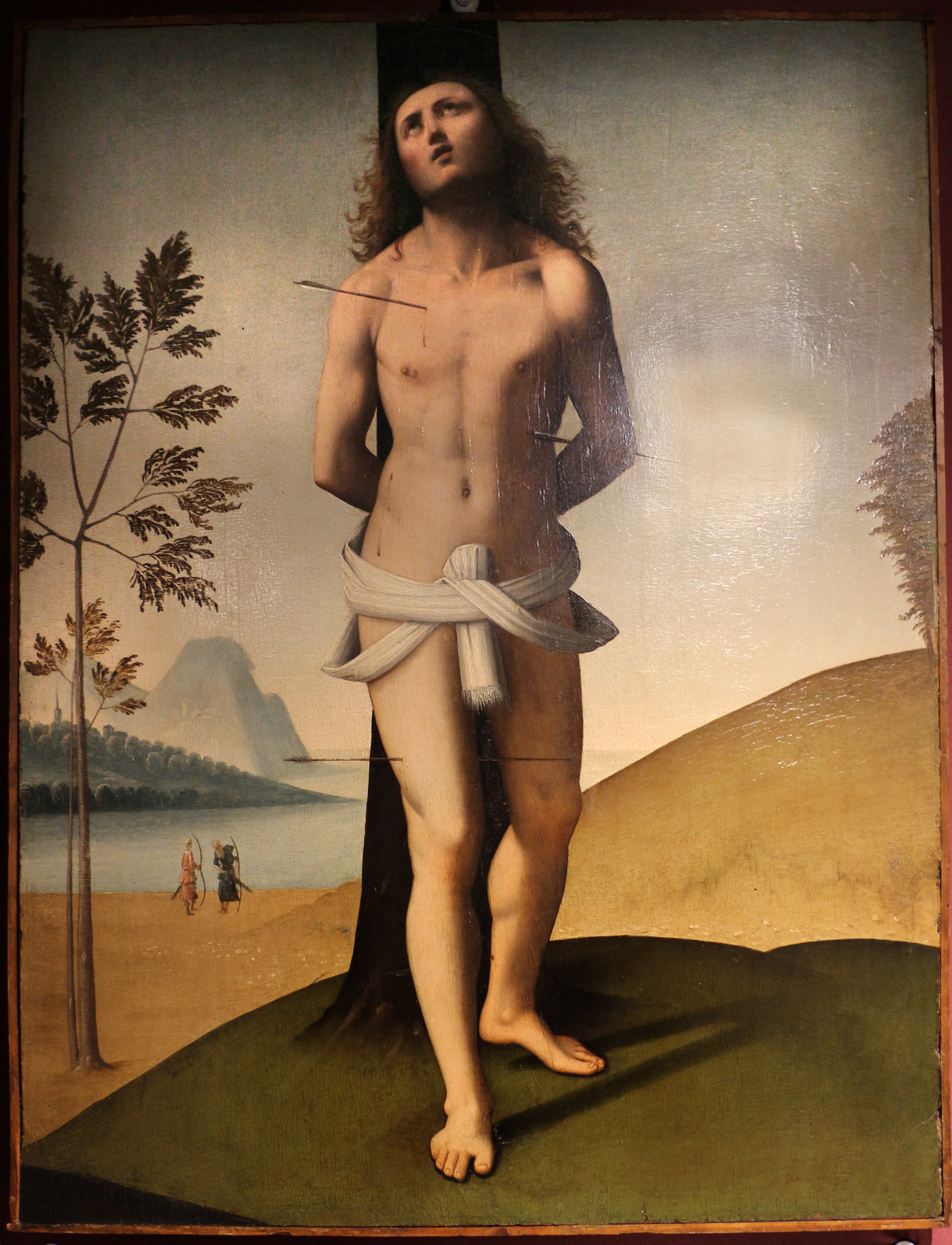
Saint Sebastian, by Giovanni Battista Benvenuti (aka L'Ortolano)

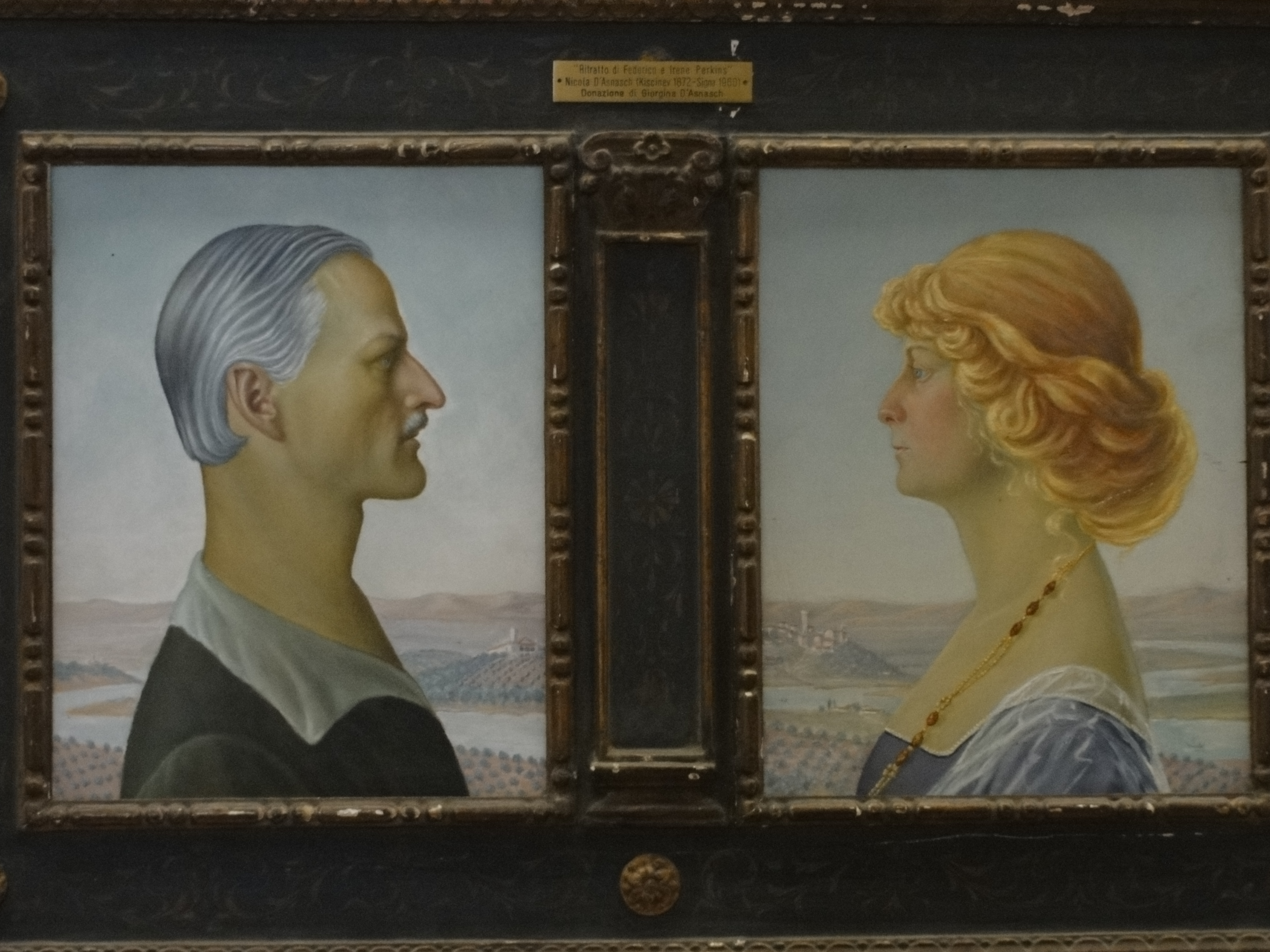
Portrait of Frederick and Irene Perkins by Nicola D'Asnasch (1872–1960)

== See also ==
- Basilica of Saint Francis of Assisi
- Secular Franciscan Order
- Friars Minor Conventual
- Francis of Assisi

== Bibliography ==
- Morello, Giovanni, ed. (1999). "Il miracolo di Assisi". Assisi non più Assisi. Il tesoro della Basilica di San Francesco (in Italian). Milano: Electa. p. 3. ISBN 88-435-6672-5.
- Bargioli, C. (2011). "Paliotto di Sisto IV". In Benati, D.; Natale, M.; Paolucci, A. (eds.). Melozzo da Forlì. L'umana bellezza tra Piero della Francesca e Raffaello (in Italian). Milano: Silvana Editore.
- Il Tesoro della Basilica di San Francesco ad Assisi, saggi e catalogo di R. Bonito Fanelli ... [et al.], coordinamento di M. G. Ciardi Dupré dal Poggetto, introduzione di Ulrich Middeldorf (in Italian). Firenze, EDAM: Casa Editrice Francescana. 1980.
- Magro, Pasquale (2002). Museo del Tesoro, Collezione F. M. Perkins, Basilica di san Francesco in Assisi. Origine e sviluppo, itinerario artistico (in Italian). Assisi: Casa Editrice Francescana.
- Nessi, Silvestro (1980). "Il Tesoro di S. Francesco in Assisi: formazione e dispersione". In Casa Editrice Francescana (ed.). Il Tesoro della Basilica di San Francesco ad Assisi, saggi e catalogo di R. Bonito Fanelli (coordination M.G. Ciardi Dupré dal Poggetto, introduction Ulrich Middeldorf [et al.]) (in Italian). Firenze (Florence, Italy): EDAM.
- Federico, Zeri (1988). La Collezione Federico Mason Perkins (Sala Alitalia, Museo-Tesoro della Basilica di S. Francesco). Assisi: Casa Editrice Francescana.
