= Guccio di Mannaia =

Italian goldsmith

Guccio di Mannaia (Malnaia; Malnaggia; Manaie; Mannaie) was an Italian goldsmith from Siena, Italy active from 1288 to 1322. He is best known for a 13th-century decorated gold-plated chalice which contains the first documented use of translucent enamels using the technique known as basse-taille.

== Biographical details ==
Little is known about the life of Guccio di Mannaia, and very few works are attributed to him with certainty. He came from a family of Sienese goldsmiths, with his brother (Pino) as well as his three sons (Montigiano, Mannaia, and Jacopo) working in the same trade. He was influenced by Pace di Valentino who was the first Sienese goldsmith working for the papal court (under popes Nicholas III, Martin IV, Honorius IV, and Boniface VIII). In addition, he seems to have been familiar with northern European artworks, such as the Westminster retable in England and the miniatures in illuminated manuscripts of the Parisian Master Honoré, to which the human figures in his work are often compared. It is certain that he was actively working until 1322 though he was dead by 1329.

== Works ==
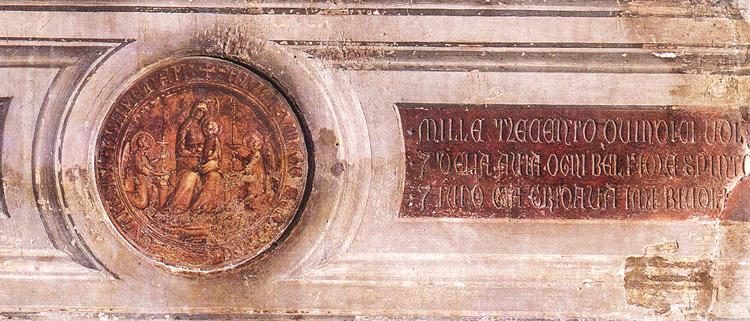
Detail of a fresco by Simone Martini based on a seal made by Guccio di Mannaia in 1298

Guccio di Mannaia engraved four seals from 1292 to 1318 for which receipts of payment exist, and although one of these works is now lost the other three survive. He was well known in Siena, his city of origin, and received numerous official commissions; it is likely that the number of seals produced under his direction was vast.

== Chalice of Nicholas IV ==
Guccio di Mannaia's only signed work is a chalice "of extraordinary importance and quality" made in 1288-1292 at the request of Pope Nicholas IV for the Basilica of Saint Francis in Assisi. The base and knop were made of gold-plated silver using the lost-wax method, while the cup, made of the same material, was created through embossing. It contains technical details including finely wrought repoussé leaves with other metalwork features that mark it as "Tuscan Gothic"; both its form and technique were widely copied. In addition, the chalice is decorated with ninety-six translucent and semi-translucent enamels. The enamels depict images of the crucifixion, the Virgin and child, symbols of the evangelists, several Franciscan saints (Saints Francis, Clare, and Anthony), Pope Nicholas himself, as well as angels, apostles, and prophets. The range of enamel colors includes azure, violet, yellow-gold, green, brown, and blue, and in various places the chiselling and engraving of the metalwork reveals the silver underneath the gold plating. His signature (Guccius Mannaie de Senis fecit) as well as the name of the commissioning Pope (Niccholaus Papa quartus) are contained in sixteen of the enamels that circumscribe the chalice’s stem. Commissioned by the first Franciscan pope, the chalice with its imagery is part of the vast decorative project that includes the frescoes and stained glass windows of the Basilica. An inventory from 1430 of the Basilica, where the chalice is still kept, contains a reference to a paten, now lost, that was decorated with a scene of the Last Supper, similar in style to the chalice. Other works attributed to him are done so based only on comparison to the chalice rather than other documentary evidence, and can be found in museums in Florence, Siena, Paris, and Berlin.

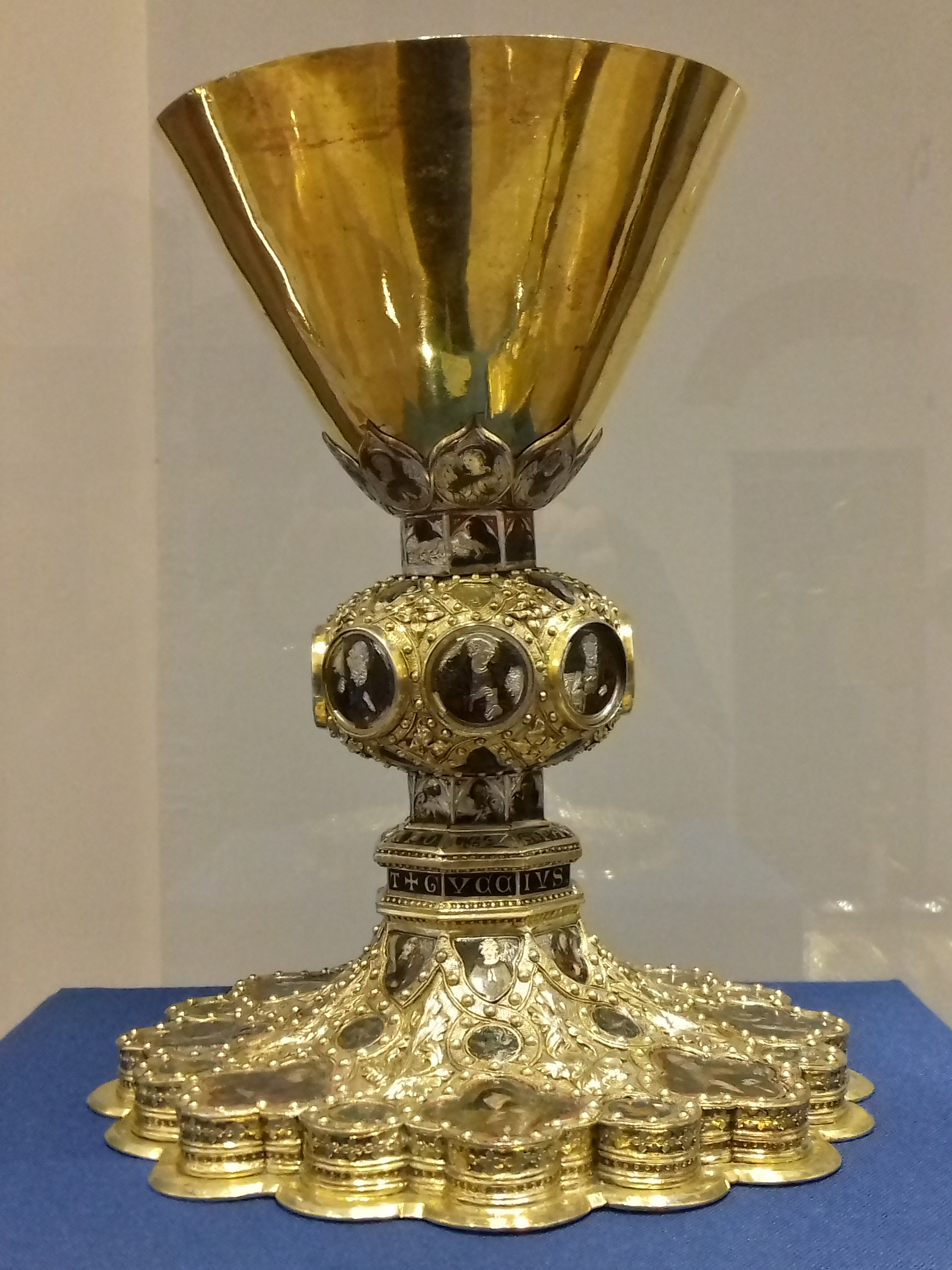

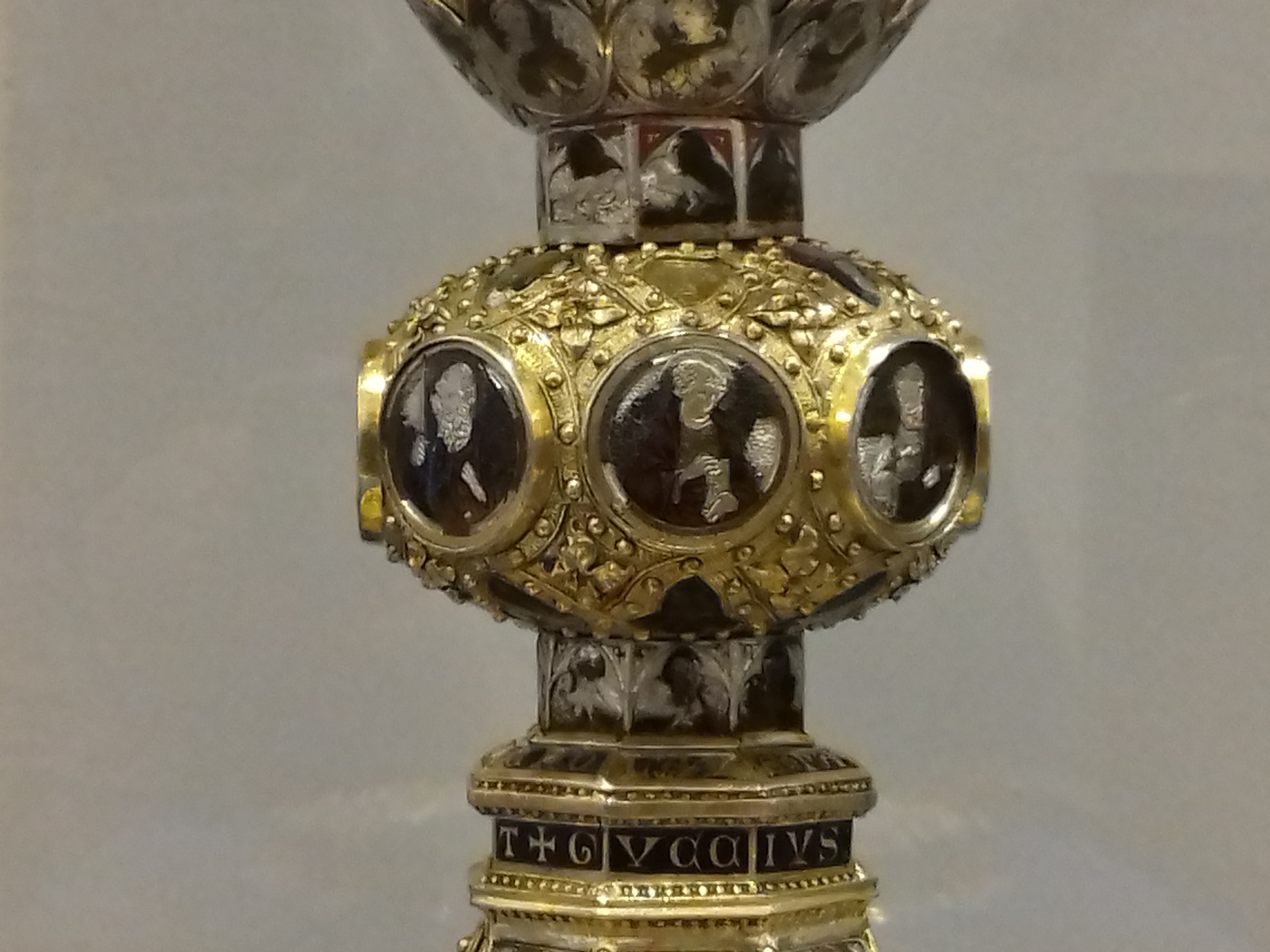

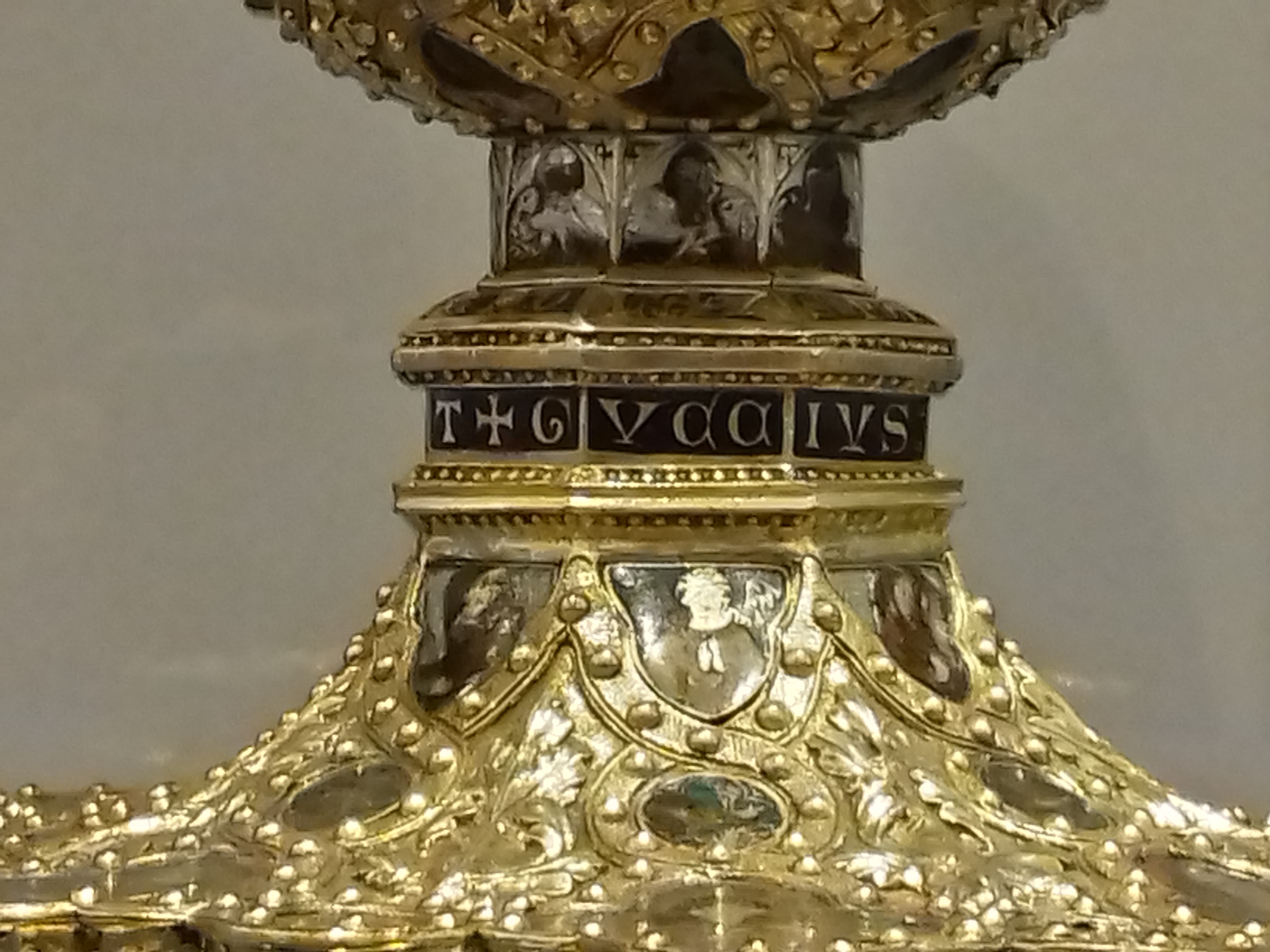

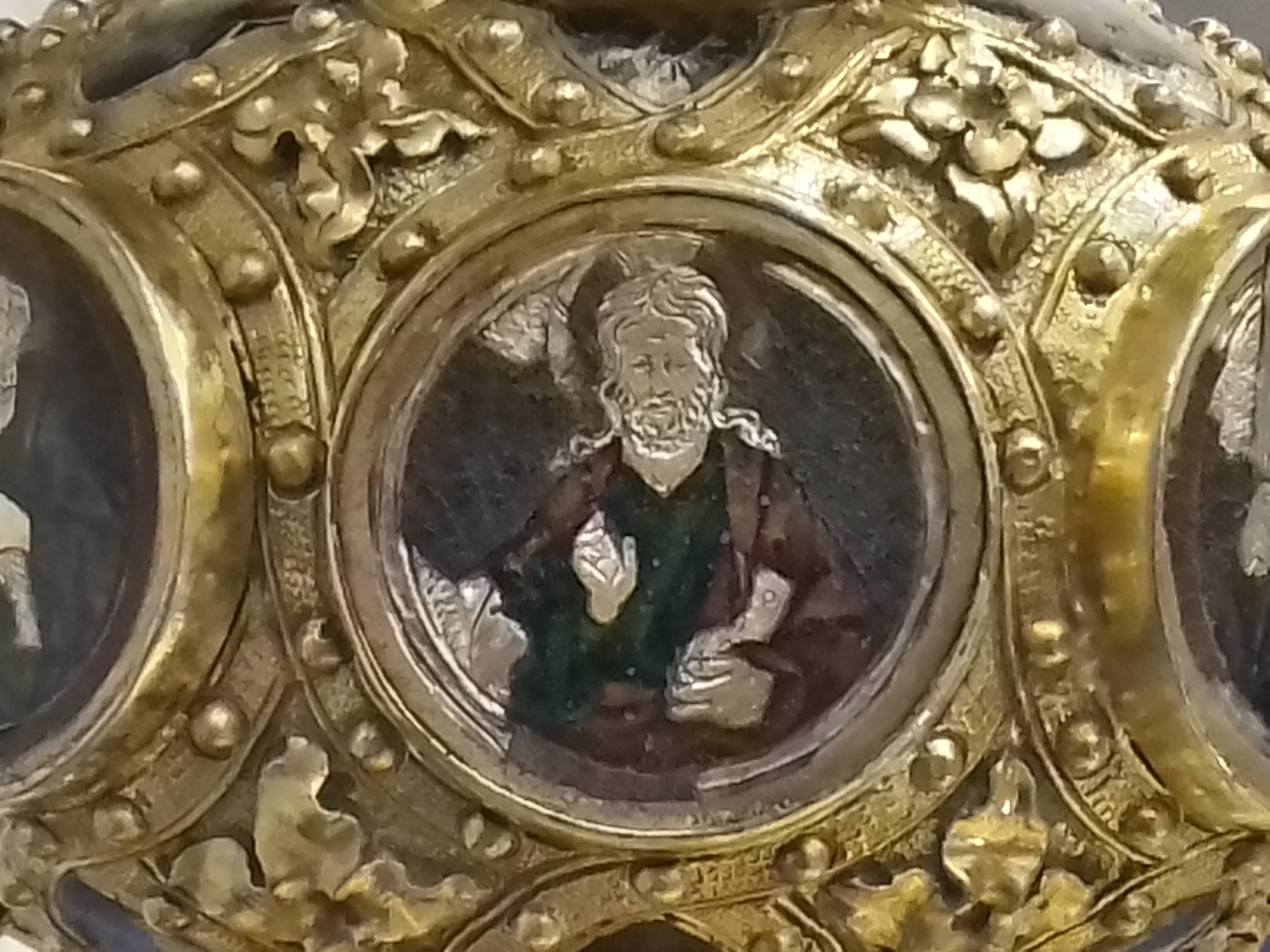

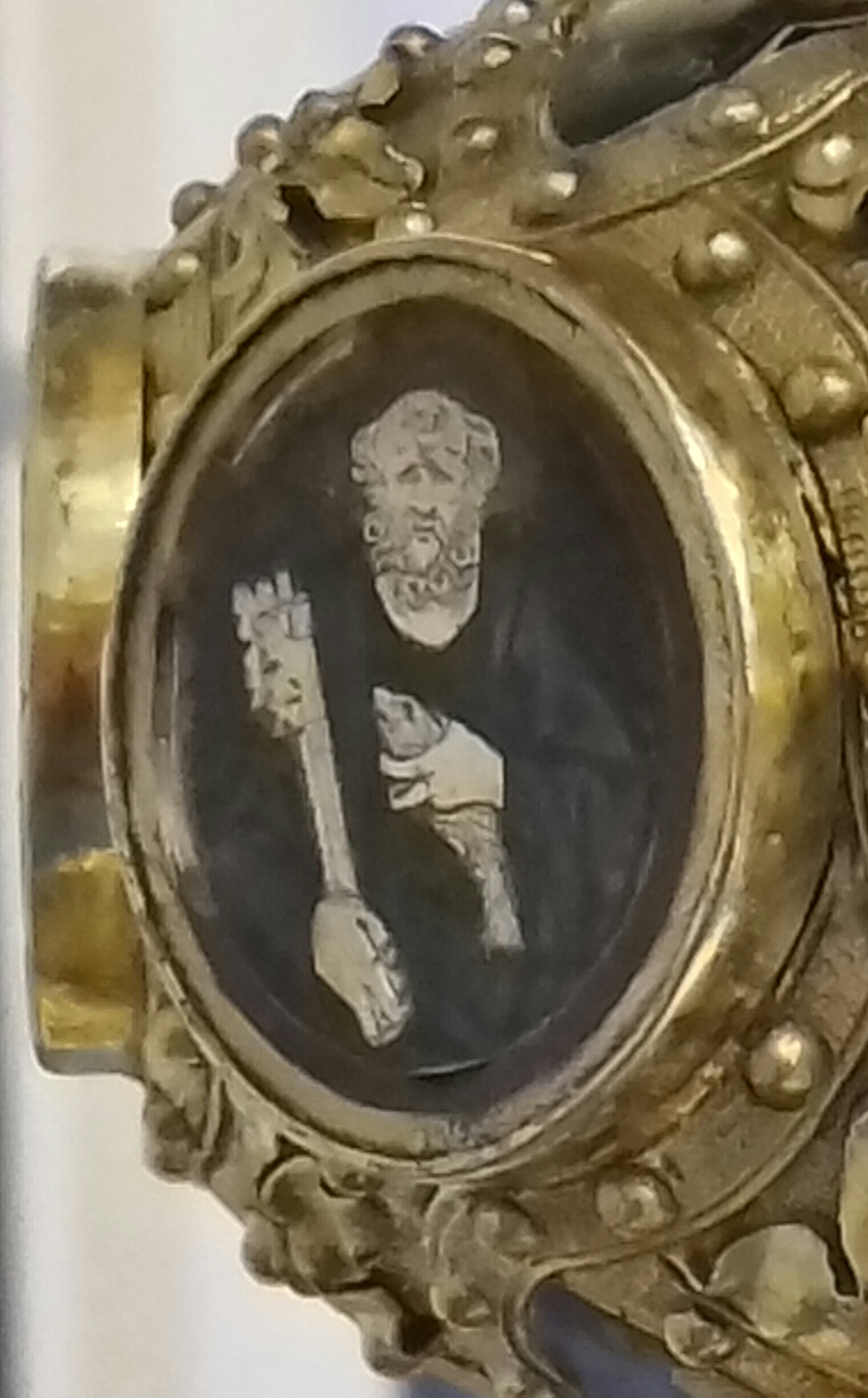

== Artistic legacy ==
Guccio di Mannaia's work would influence many other goldsmiths of the era, and his chalice would become a "fundamental model for the production of chalices in the decades to come." Tondino di Guerrino, another goldsmith from Siena, most likely studied under him as an apprentice. An image from one of Guccio's seals, that of the rulers of Siena known as the Signori Nove, was reproduced by Simone Martini in his grand Maesta, a fresco that covers an entire wall in the Palazzo Pubblico of Siena. Other imagery from this same seal, specifically the orb held by the Madonna and child, can be found also in the gilded-glass panel of a wooden reliquary from about 1347. The gilded glass panel is in the Fitzwilliam Museum, Cambridge, while the wooden frame is in the Cleveland Museum of Art. In addition, his work would anticipate that of Pietro and Ambrogio Lorenzetti.

== See also ==
- Goldsmith
- Florentine painting
- Sienese school
- Illuminated manuscript
- Virgin of Jeanne d'Evreux
