= Flori =

Flori is a surname and given name. Notable people with the name include:

== Given name ==
- Flori Gough Shorr (1905–1992), American cellist
- Flori Lang (born 1983), Swiss sprinter swimmer
- Flori Mumajesi (born 1993), Albanian recording artist
- Flori van Acker (1858–1940), Belgian painter, engraver and stamp designer

== Surname ==
- Jean Flori (1936–2018), French medieval historian
- Sebastiano Flori (active 1545), Italian painter

== See also ==
- Dr. Flori (1979–2014), born as Florian Kondi, was an Albanian recording artist, singer-songwriter and rapper
- Flori sacre, is the title of a 1912 collection of poetry by Romanian poet Alexandru Macedonski
- Malu cu Flori, is a commune in Dâmbovița County, southern Romania
- Thaumastus flori, is a species of tropical air-breathing land snail, a pulmonate gastropod mollusk in the family Megaspiridae
