= San Francesco, Terni =

Church building in Terni, Italy

Coordinates: 42.5646°N 12.6458°E

The church of San Francesco is a late-Romanesque and early-Gothic-style, Roman Catholic church and convent in the town of Terni, region of Umbria, in Italy.

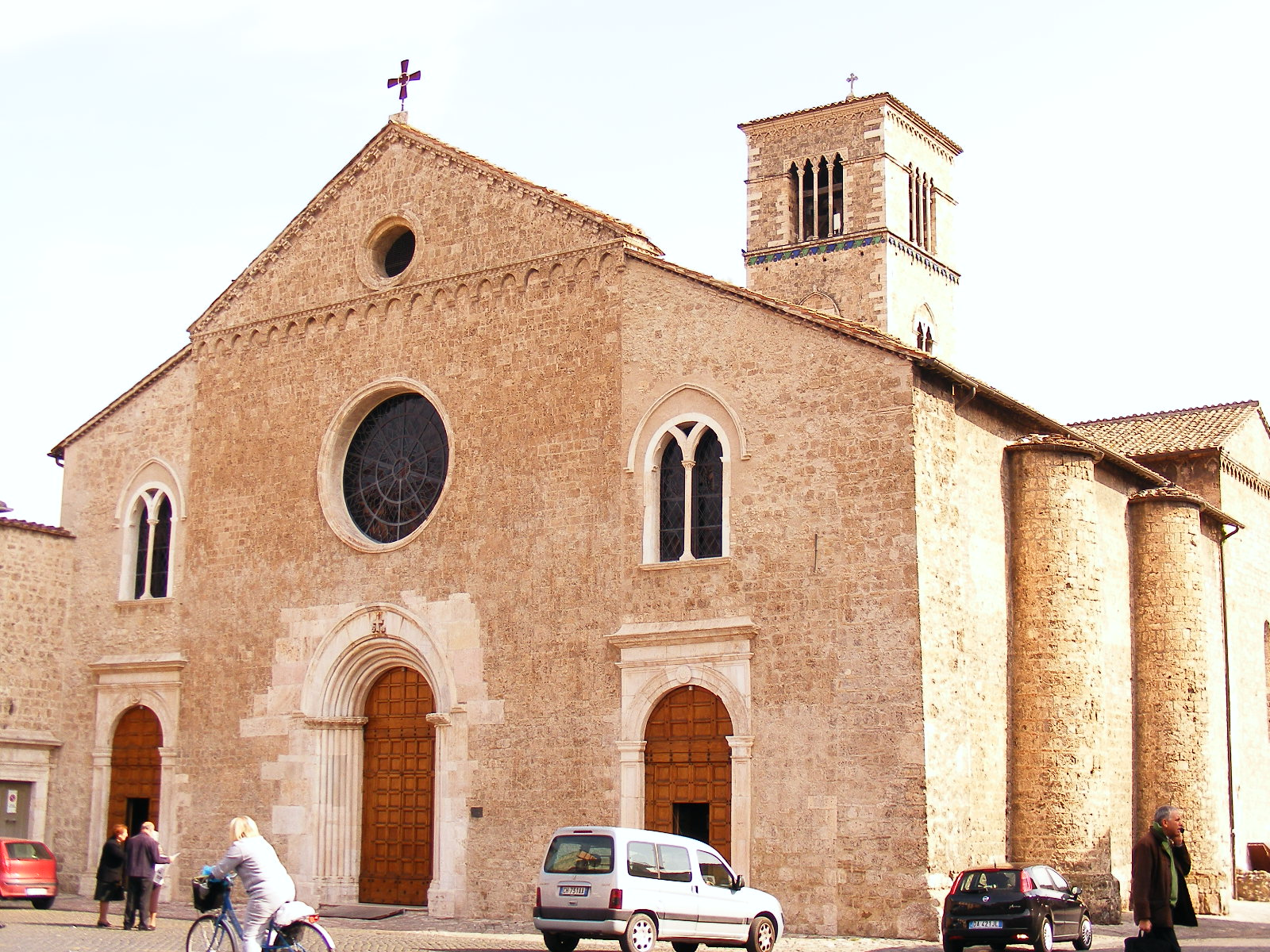
Church and convent of San Francesco

== History ==
A church at the site was originally begun in the 13th century, with a simple single nave and transept as typical of Franciscan order churches. The church was completed in 1445. The design was once attributed to a friar, frà Filippo da Campello. In the 14th century, the Paradisi chapel was built, which was decorated with frescoes by Bartolomeo di Tommaso of Foligno. The frescoes depict The Last Judgement with scenes of Paradise, Hell, and the seven major sins. The bell tower was built in the 16th century and is decorated with majolica tiles.

Also in the church is an altarpiece depicting the Adoration of the Magi by Cesare Sermei, and frescoes of the Story of the True Cross (1575) by Sebastiano Flori of Arezzo, a pupil of Giorgio Vasari.
