= Rivotorto =

- Frazione
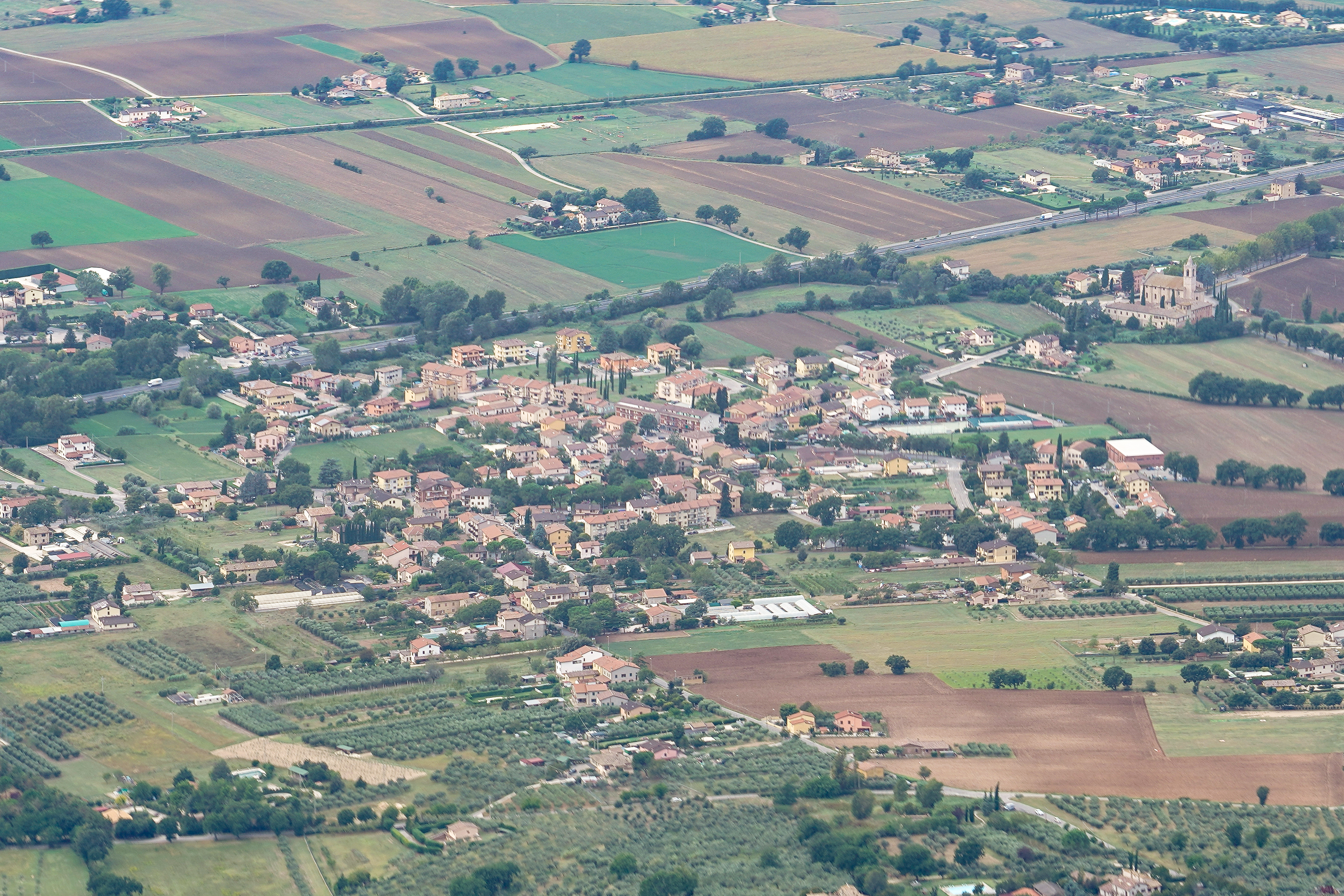
- Rivotorto from the northeast

- Location within Italy
- Coordinates: 43°02′41″N 12°37′16″E
- Country: Italy
- Region: Umbria
- Province: Perugia
- Comune: Assisi
- Elevation: 211 m (692 ft)

Population (2001)
  - Total: 1,284
- Time zone: UTC+1 (CET)
  - Summer (DST): UTC+2 (CEST)
- Postcode: 06081
- Area code: 075

Rivotorto is a frazione of the comune of Assisi in the Province of Perugia, Umbria, central Italy. It stands at an elevation of 211 m (692 ft) above sea level. At the time of the Istat census of 2001 it had 1284 inhabitants. The name comes from a small river that flows through the frazione. In the Umbrian dialect, rivo means 'stream'.

== Economy and events ==
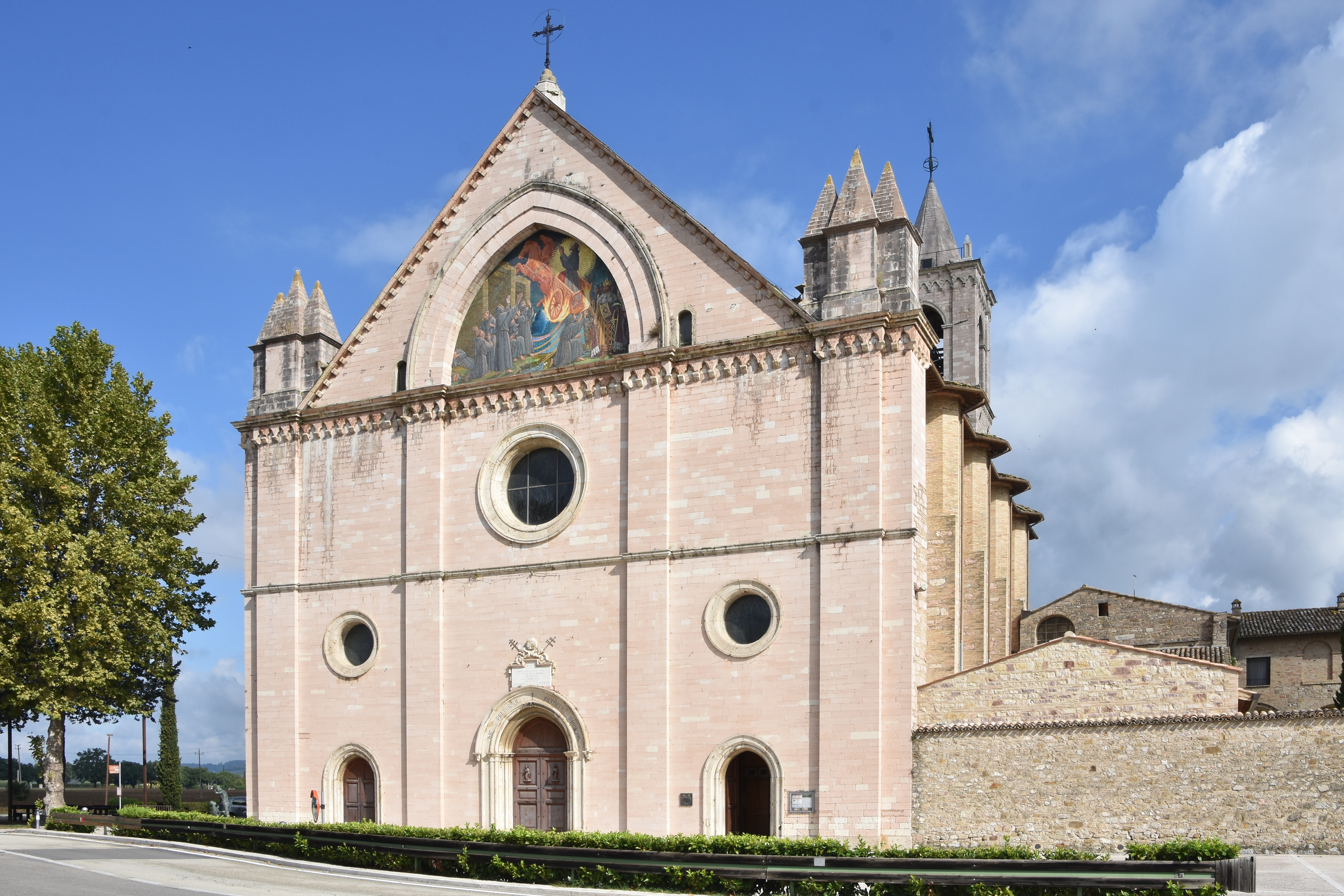
Church of Santa Maria

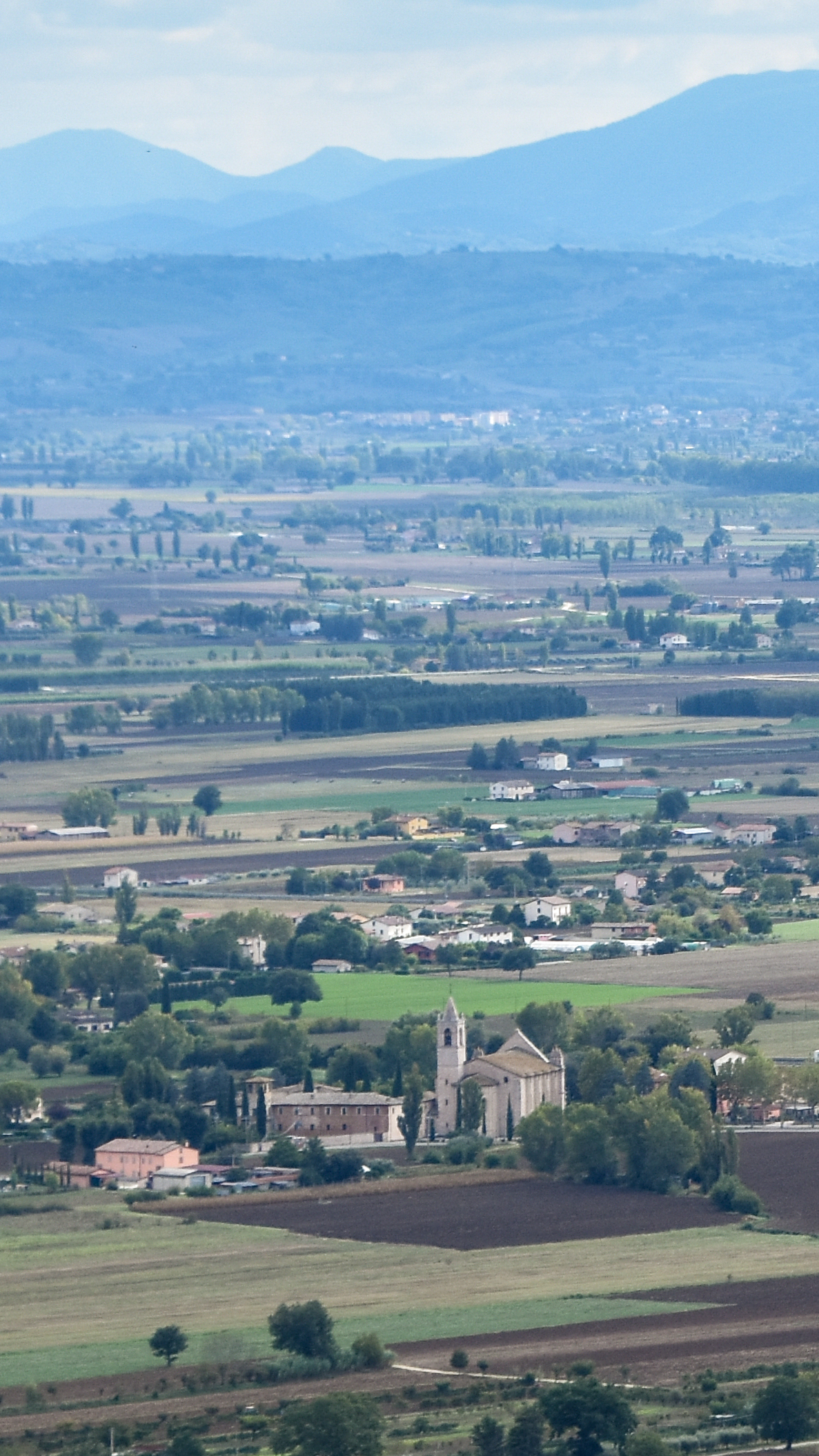
View of Sanctuary of Rivotorto and surroundings from Assisi, Sep '19

Agriculture is the main commercial activity, in particular vegetable gardening. On an industrial level, there are a number of companies operating in the wood, cement and knitwear sectors.

In the month of August the annual Rassegna degli antichi sapori ('Feast of the Ancient Flavours') is held. This is dedicated to traditional foods that are handmade and prepared on the spot.

== Monuments and places of interest ==
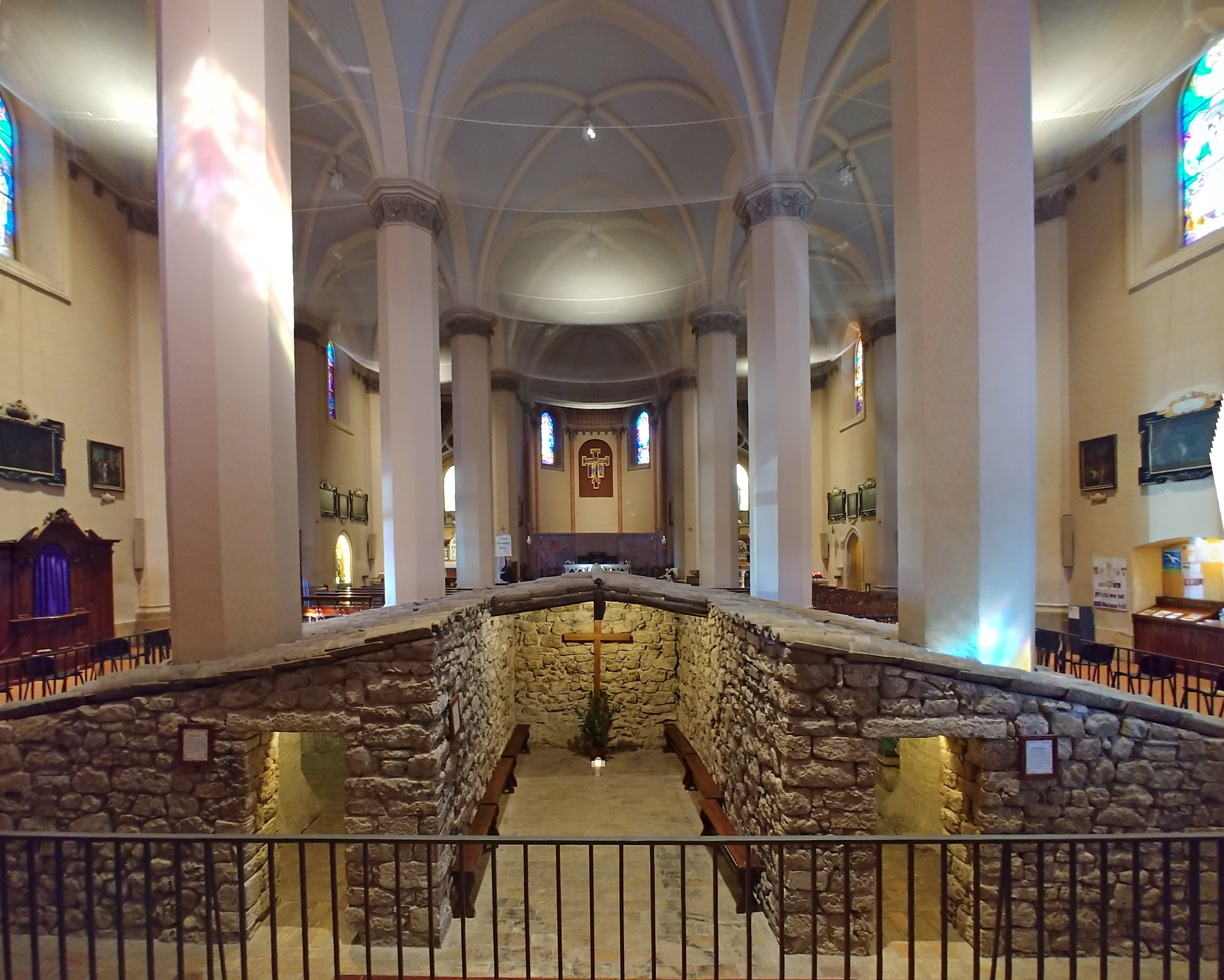
Sacro Tugurio inside the Sanctuary

Franciscan Sanctuary of Rivotorto

Also known as the Church of Santa Maria, this is a major monument in Rivotorto. St. Francis of Assisi started his life of austerity in a stone hovel in Rivotorto where he lived from 1209 to 1211. In 1455, a chapel, the sanctuary, was built around the hovel. After a severe earthquake in 1853, the Franciscan Sanctuary of Rivotorto was rebuilt in neo-Gothic style between 1860–1880.

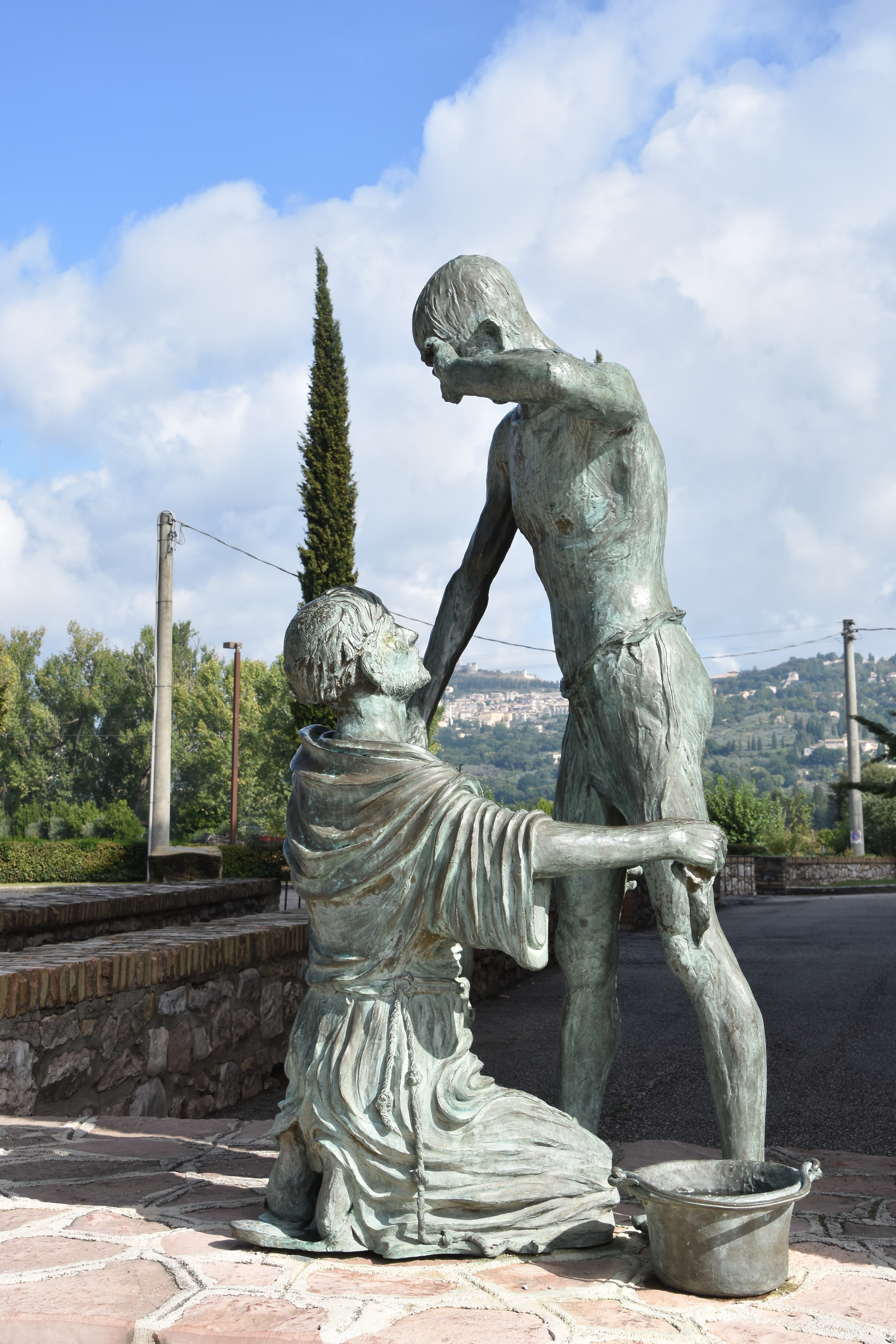
St Francis washing a leper – bronze (2001) by Fiorenze Bacci

The sacro tugurio (sacred hut) inside the sanctuary is probably not the original hut. However, it is the site from which St. Francis set off to walk to Rome with ten companions to meet the Pope. On the northwest side of the church is a bronze statue of St. Francis washing a leper by Fiorenze Bacci (2001). Inside there are also paintings by the 17th-century Orvieto painter Cesare Sermei. Next to the church stands a convent with a large cloister.

Other places of interest

- United Kingdom and Commonwealth Military Cemetery (Assisi War Cemetery), the largest British cemetery in Umbria, built at the end of World War II.
- Church of the Holy Trinity (11th century) on a Roman-era building with a frescoed apse.
- Oratory of San Giovanni Battista with three frescoes by an unknown artist.
- Former church of San Pietro della Spina (11th century) later incorporated into a farmhouse and used until the early 1900s. Used today as a warehouse for agricultural equipment.
- Church of Santa Maria Maddalena, Romanesque from the 12th century, on the border of Rivotorto, on the road that leads to Santa Maria degli Angeli, former leper colony of San Lazzaro dell'Arce, also frequented by St. Francis. Today only the chapel with the stone facade and bell tower still stand. Apse with 17th century fresco.
- Church of San Rufino in Arce not far from Maddalena towards Castelnuovo incorporated in a farmhouse, with frescoes from the 15th and 16th centuries. Discovered in the restorations of the 1990s.

== Sports ==
Sports associations

- Rivoc5 (5-a-side football) plays in the Series C2 regional championship group A
- A.S.D.Rivo (football) plays in the regional championship of Second category group B 2019/2020 (currently in second position)
- S.S.D.Assisi Subasio (football), plays in the championship of excellence for the 2019/2020 season; the highest point in its history was the Umbrian championship of excellence, in the mid-1990s.
- Rivotorto women's volleyball
- u.c. Rivotortese

== Gallery ==
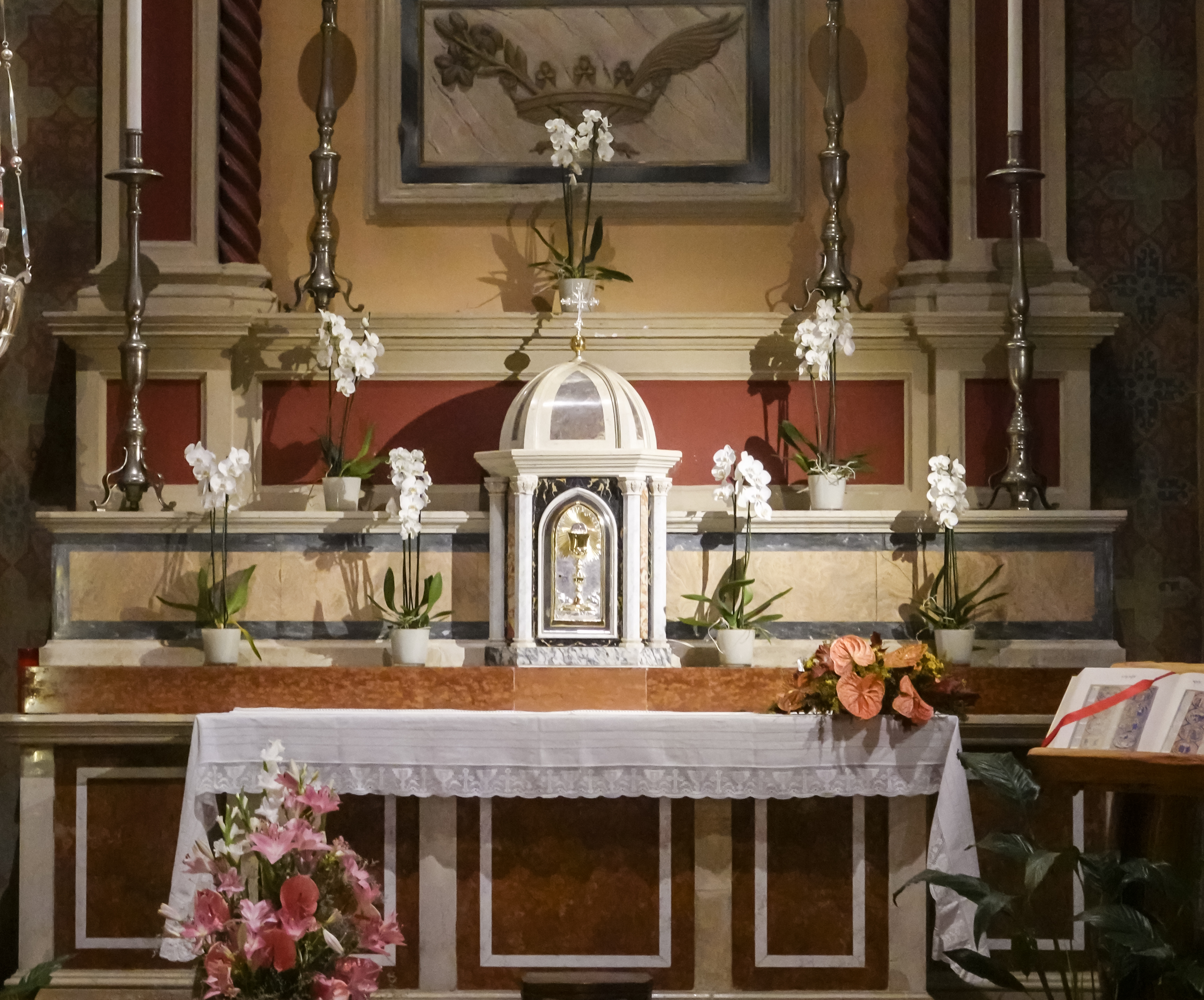
Altar on the left in the Sanctuary

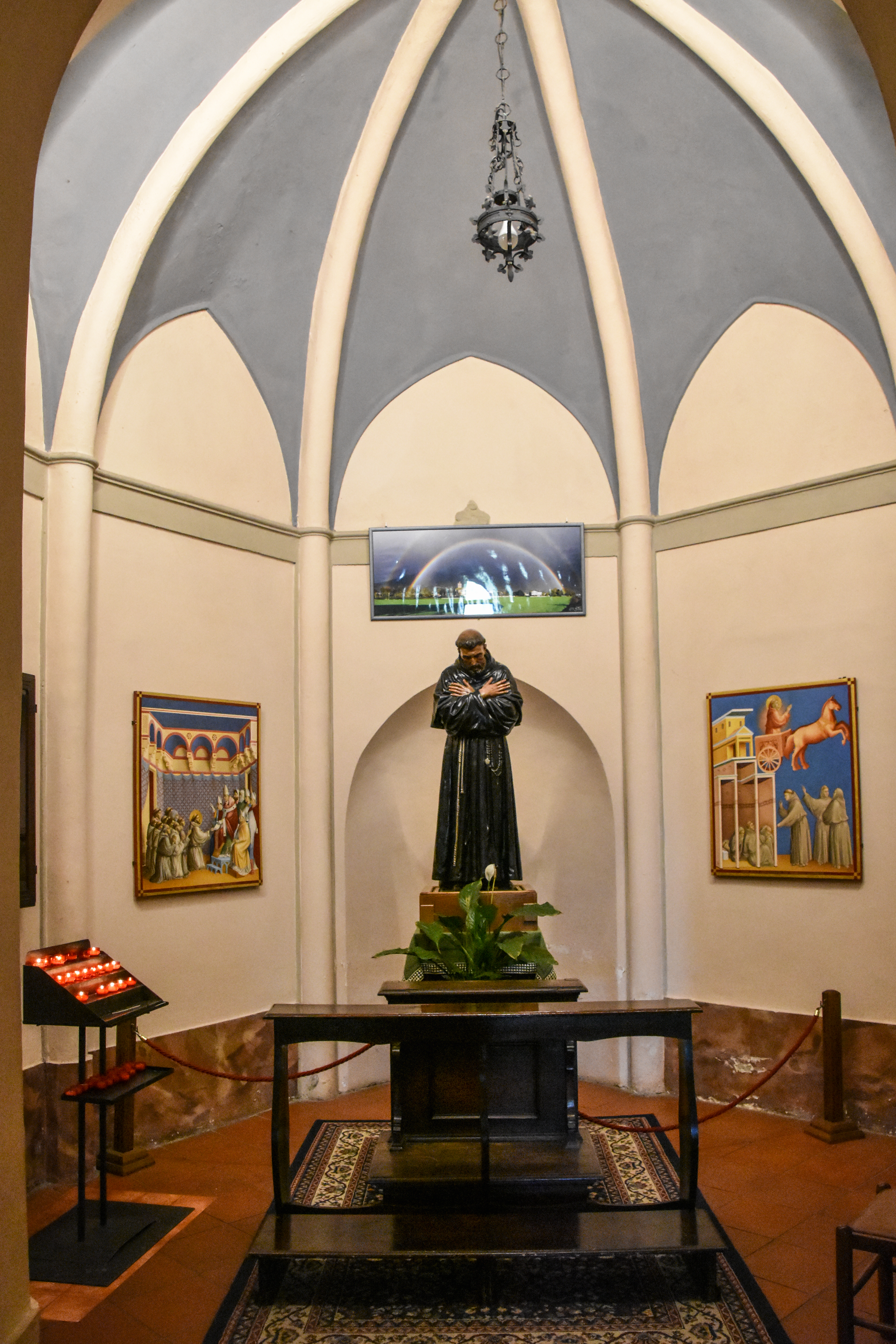
Altar on the right in the Sanctuary

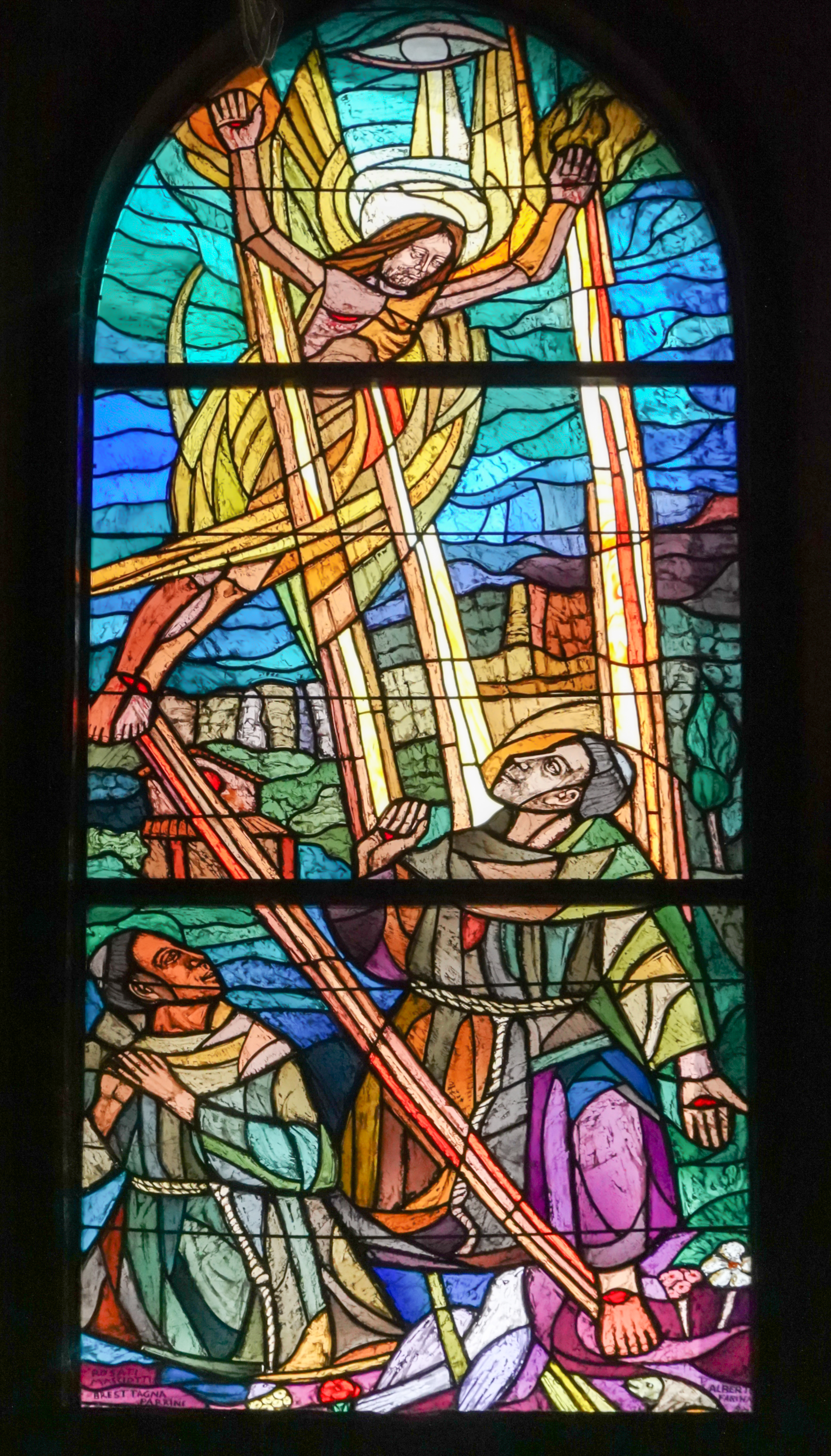
Stained-glass window in the Sanctuary

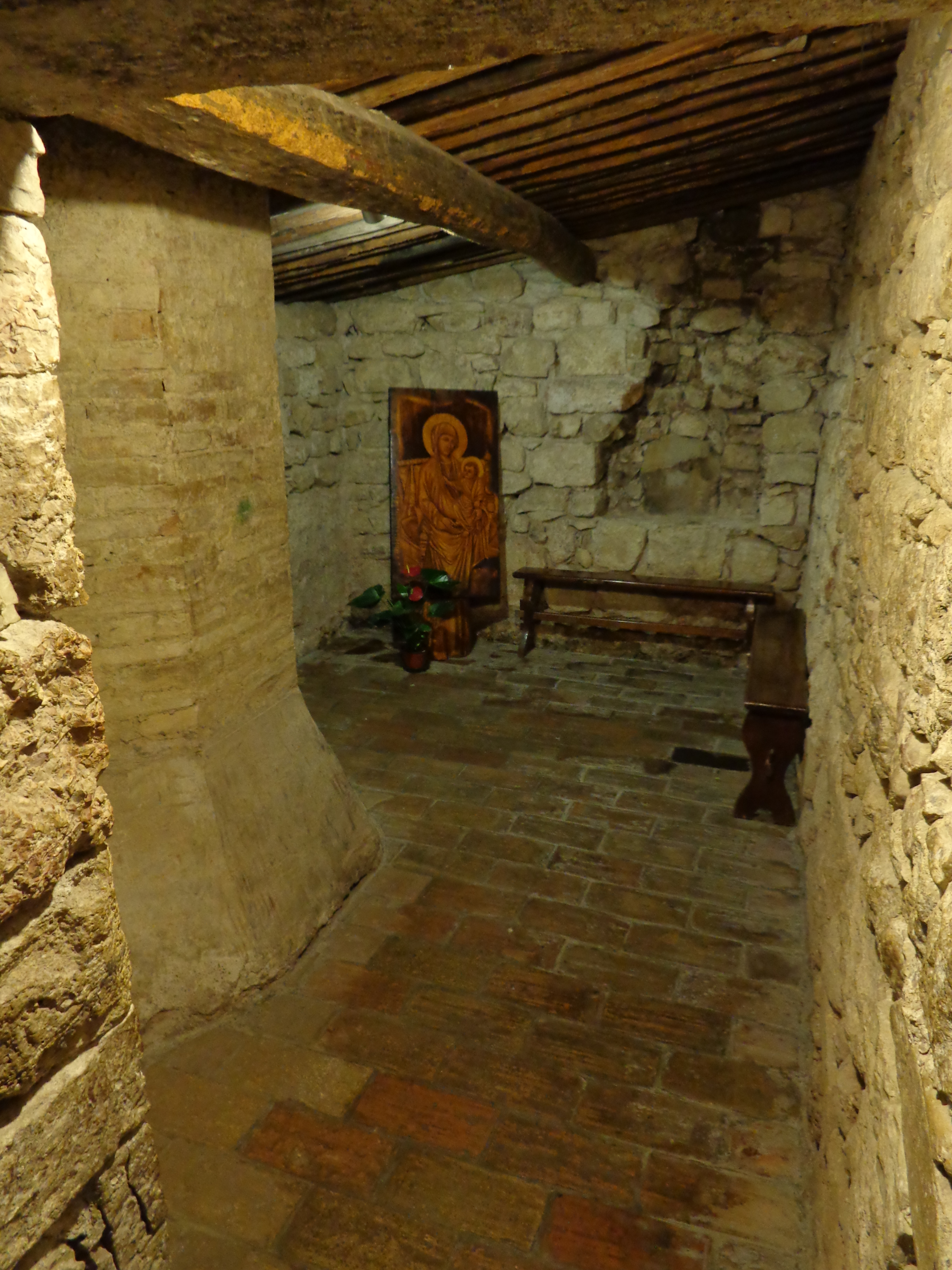
Left room in the Sacro Tugurio

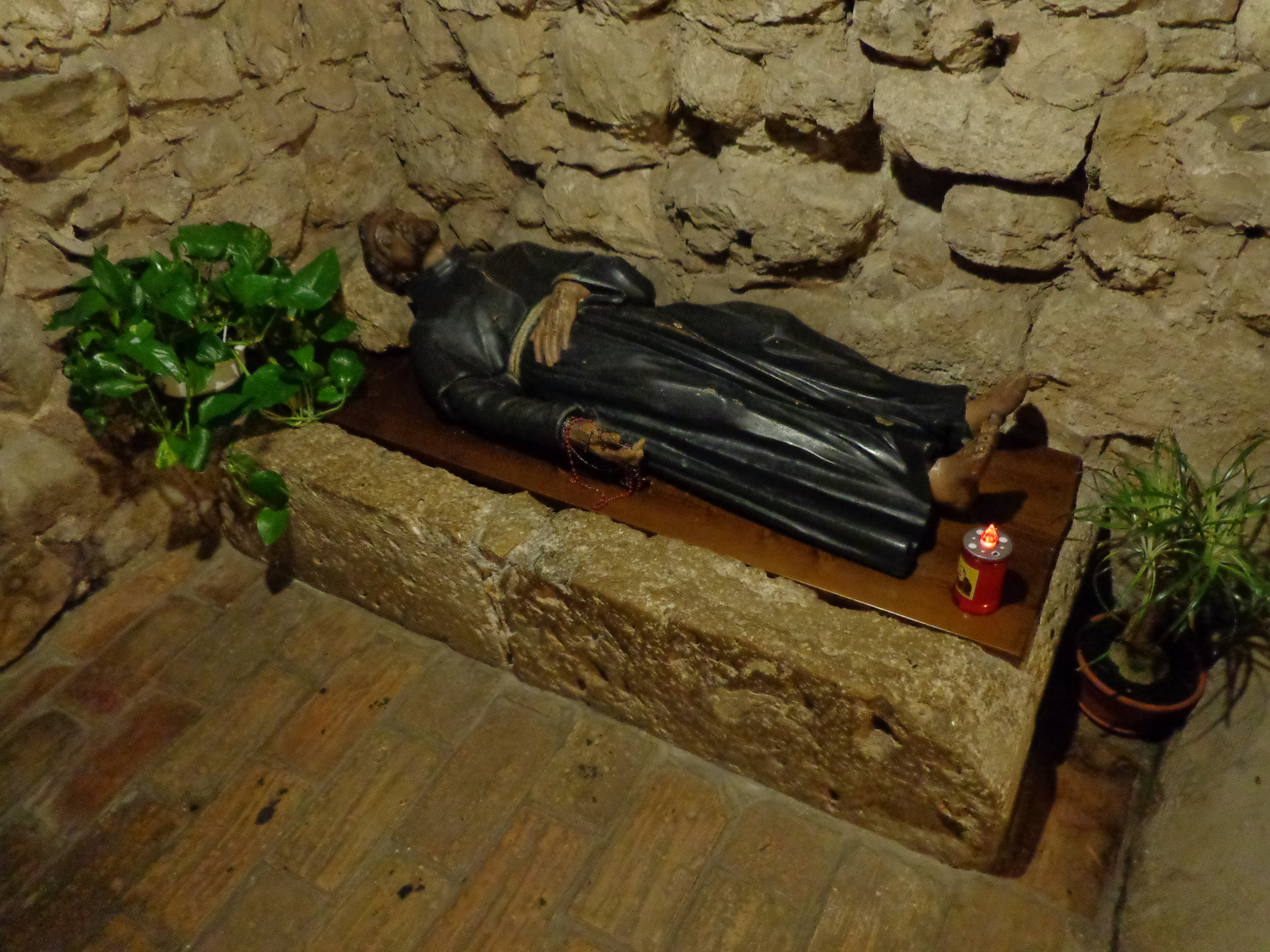
Right room in the Sacro Tugurio

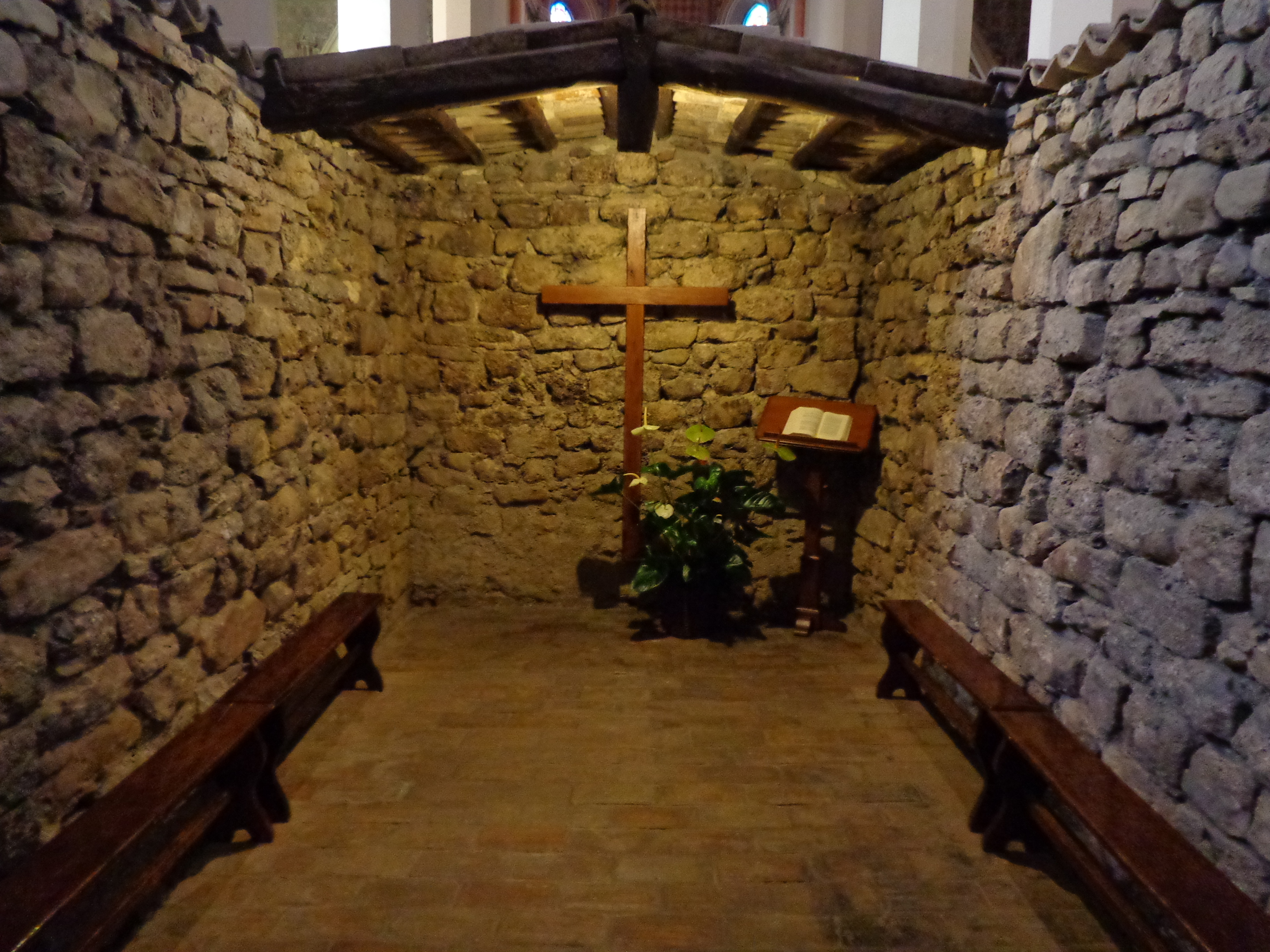
Chapel in the Sacro Tugurio

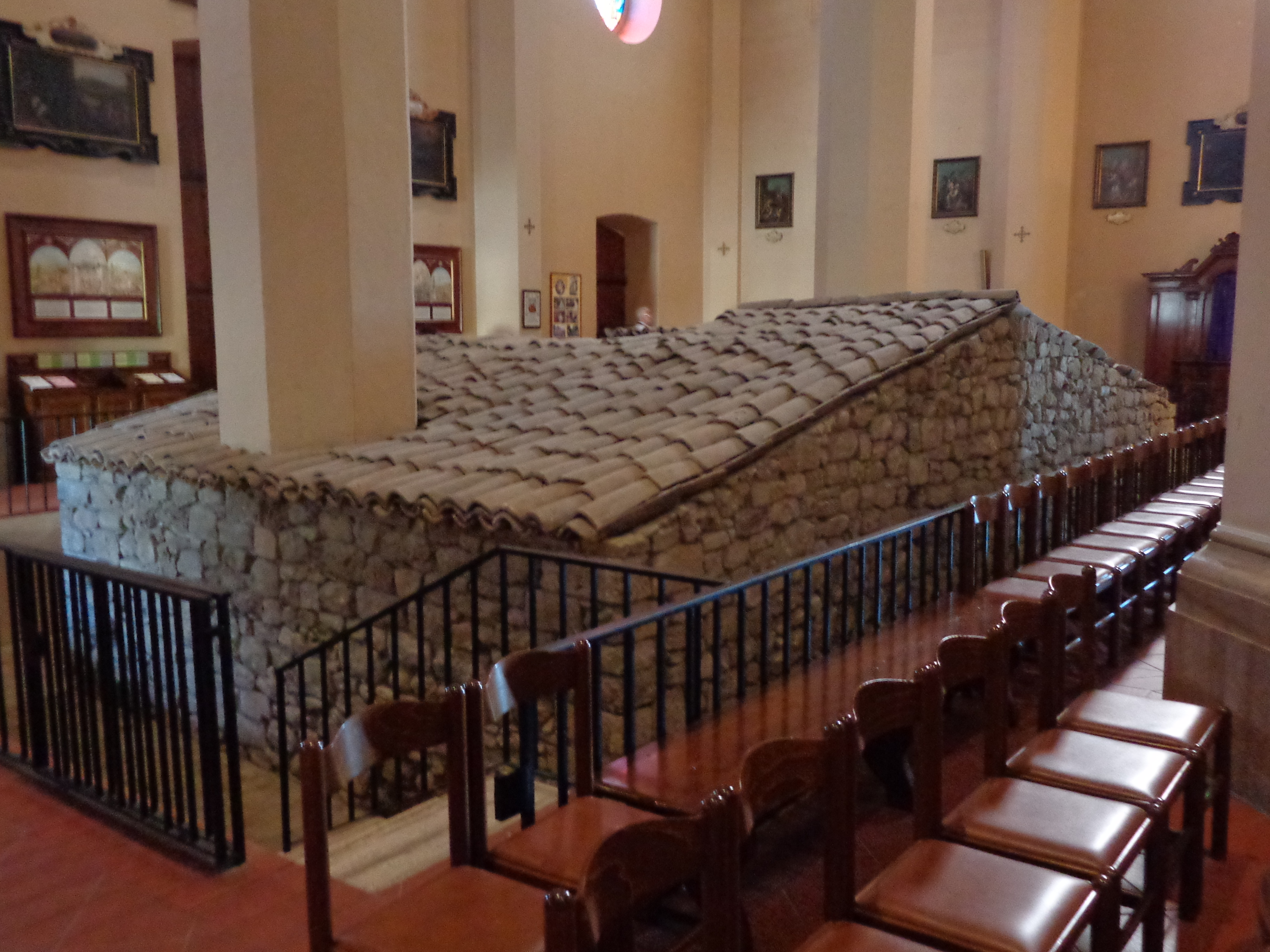
Roof of the Sacro Tugurio

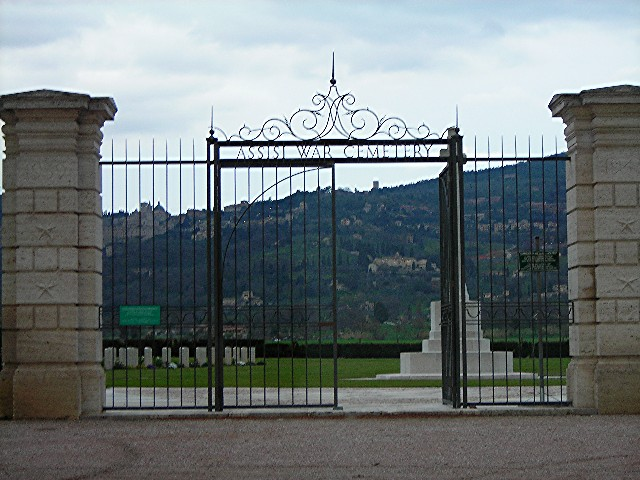
Assisi War Cemetery

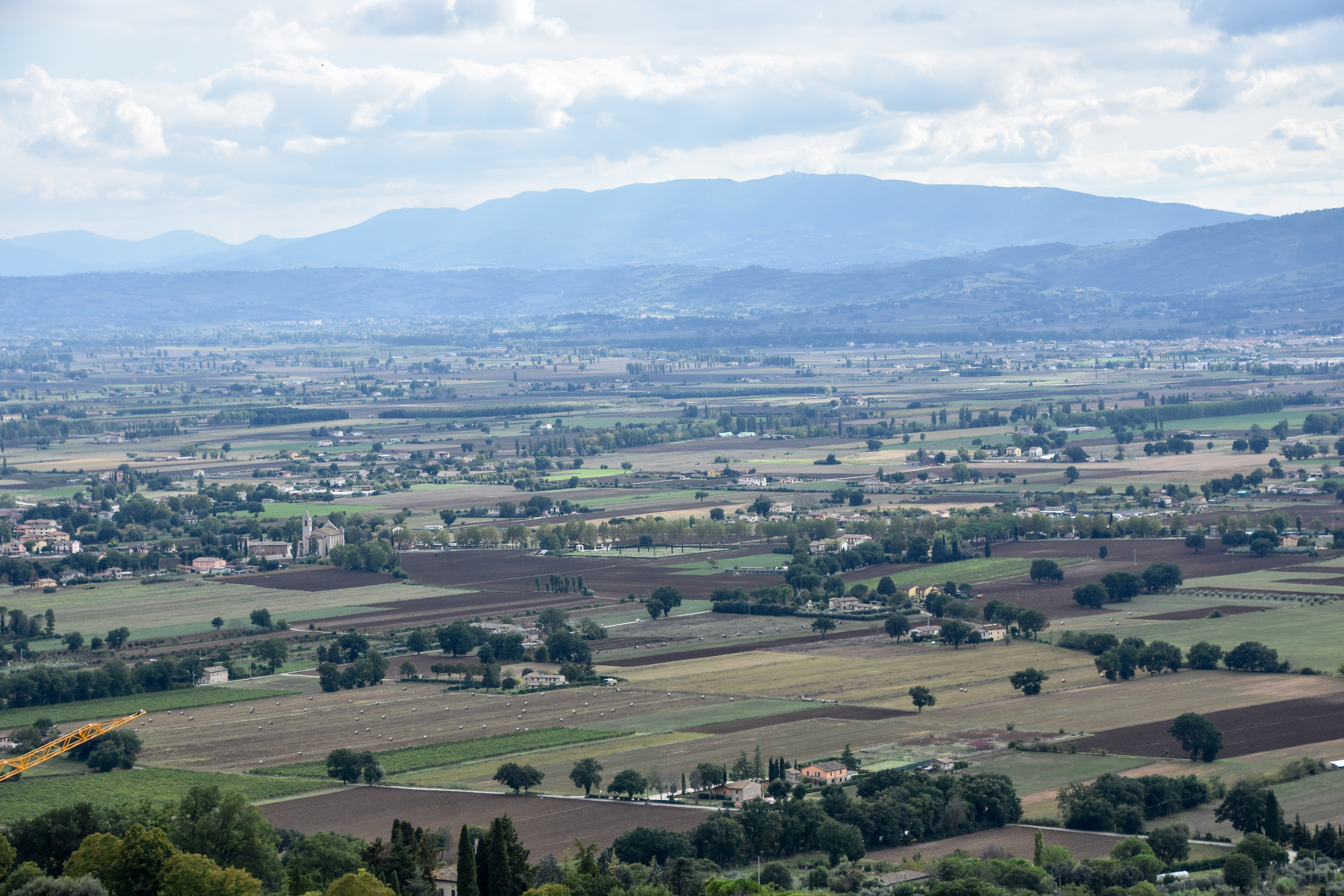
Rivotorto (left of centre), view from Assisi
