= Cesare Sermei =

Italian painter

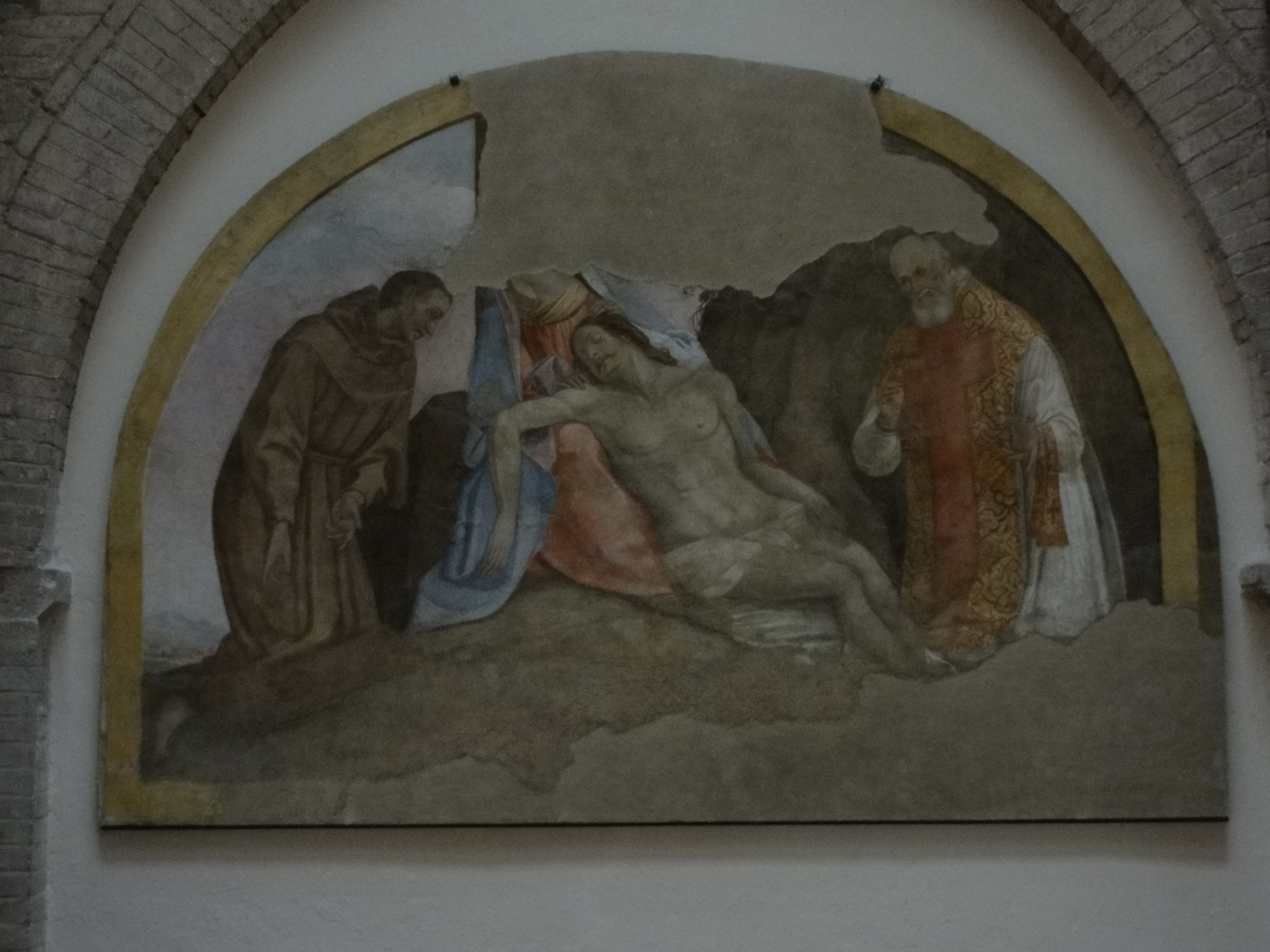
Pietà with Saints Francis and Philip Neri by Cesare Sermei (1630-50), fragment of a fresco in the Sacro Convento, Assisi

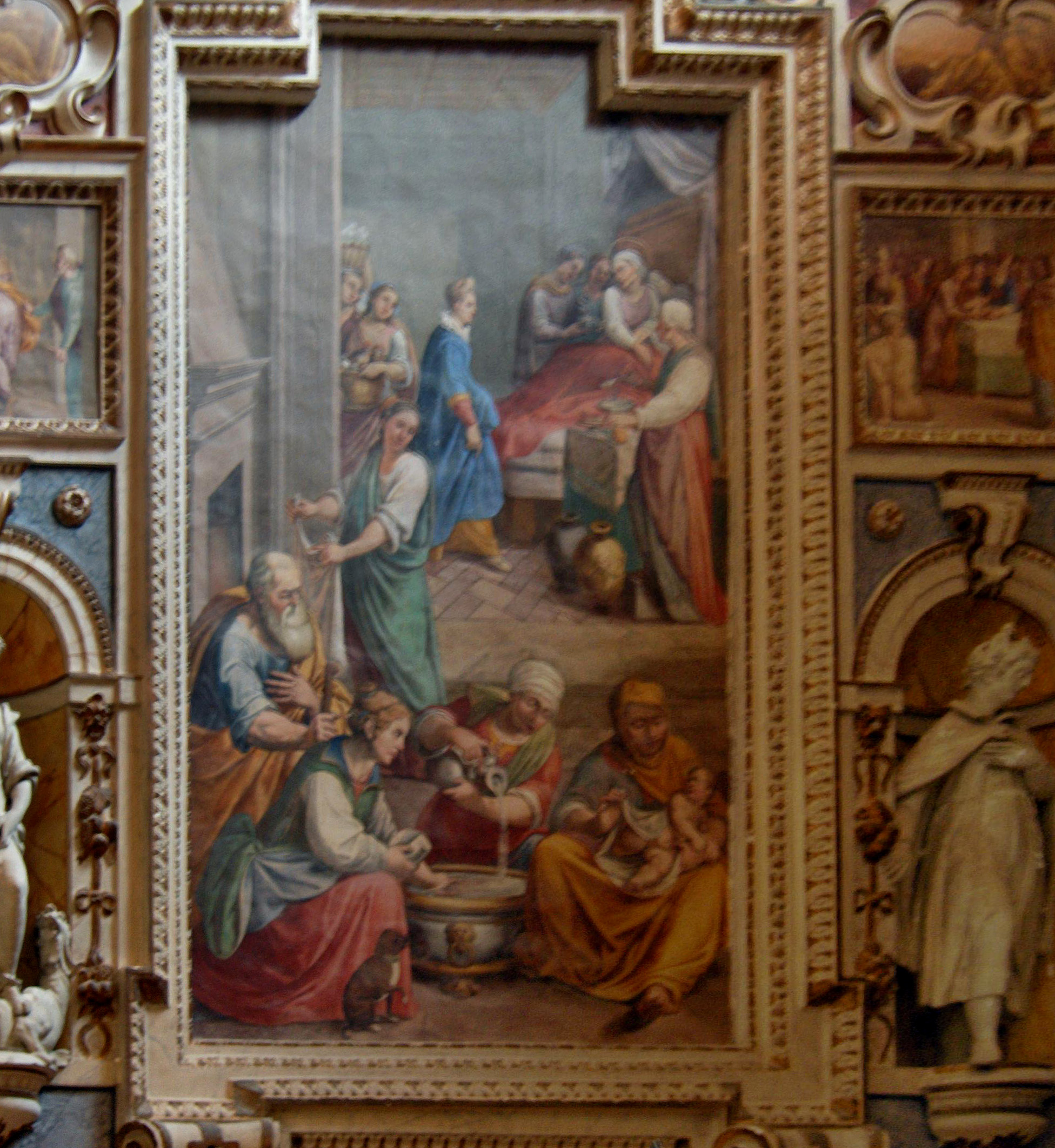
Birth of Saint John the Baptist by Cesare Sermei, in the Basilica of Saint Mary of the Angels, Assisi

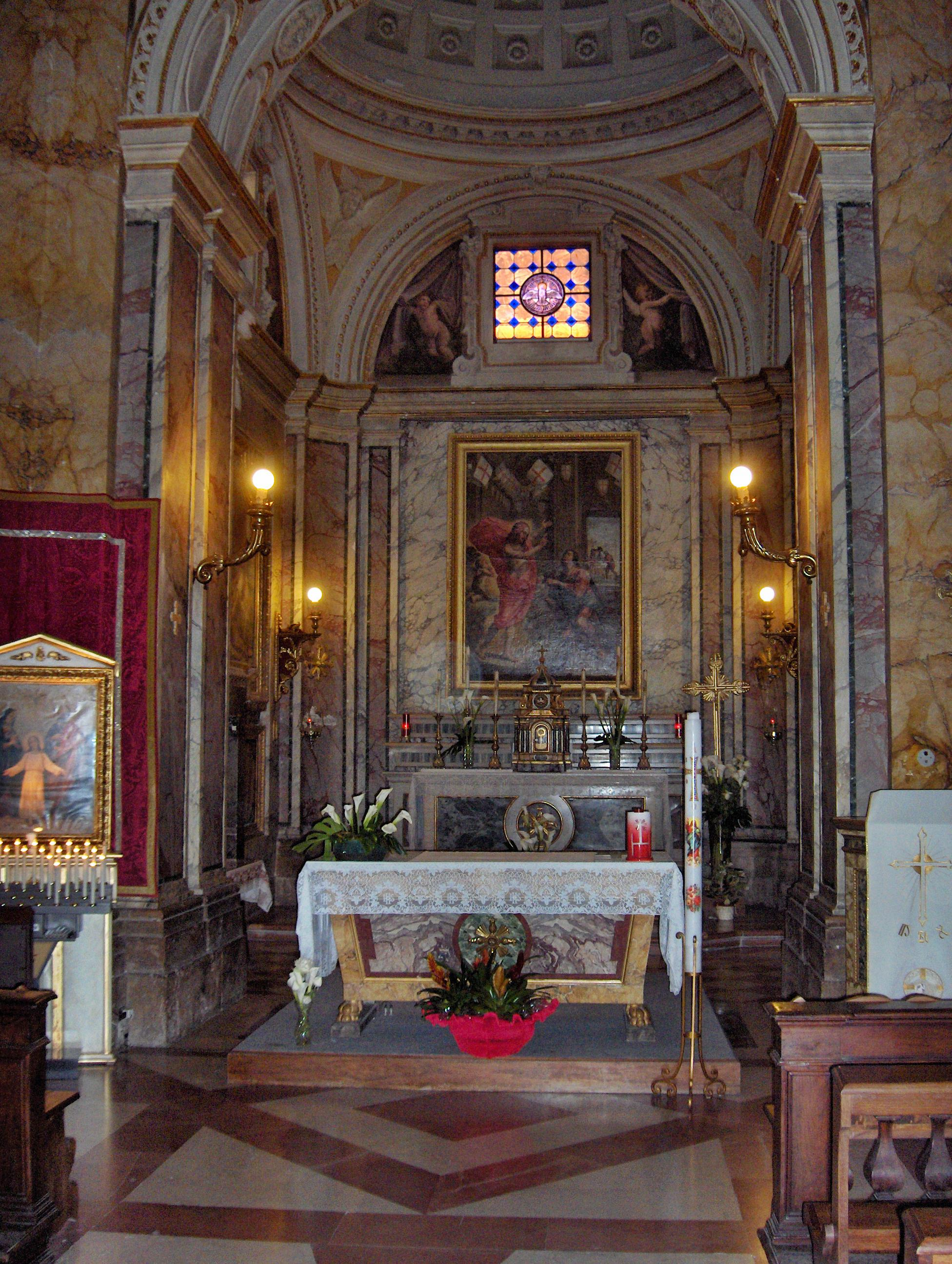
Annunciation by Cesare Sermei (1627-30), Main altar of the Chiesa Nuova, Assisi

Cesare Sermei (Città della Pieve, c. 1581 – Assisi, 1668) was an Italian painter. Son of painter Fernando Sermei, he learned to paint in the workshop of Cesare Nebbia, primarily moving between Orvieto and Rome.

In 1608 Sermei established himself in Assisi and became a citizen of the city three years later. His career was long and he worked not only in Assisi but all over Umbria, including in the cities of Todi, Perugia, Bastia Umbra, Foligno, and Terni. In Assisi his work can be found in the Basilica of Saint Francis (among other works by him in the Basilica a large fresco of the Universal Judgement in the apse of the Lower Church, the most demanding artistic work done in the Basilica during the 17th century), the Basilica of Saint Mary of the Angels, the Chiesa Nuova, the Bishop's Residence, and the church of Rivotorto (which contains a series of 12 oil paintings (Note: Sermei completed 16 canvases, but four were destroyed in 1853 when an earthquake damaged the church.) from 1653 portraying the activities of Saint Francis and his early followers).

Sermei also collaborated with other artists, including Girolamo Martelli and Giacomo Giorgetti.

Sermei's pictorial language is expressive and direct; his works are clear, immediate, and easy to understand. He frequently employed architectural elements to create the background of his works. His protagonists are always majestic and grandiose yet remain human. His style was influenced by the Late Mannerist painters, especially Giovanni Baglione but also Cavalier d’Arpino.
