= Flori Gough Shorr =

American cellist (1905–1992)

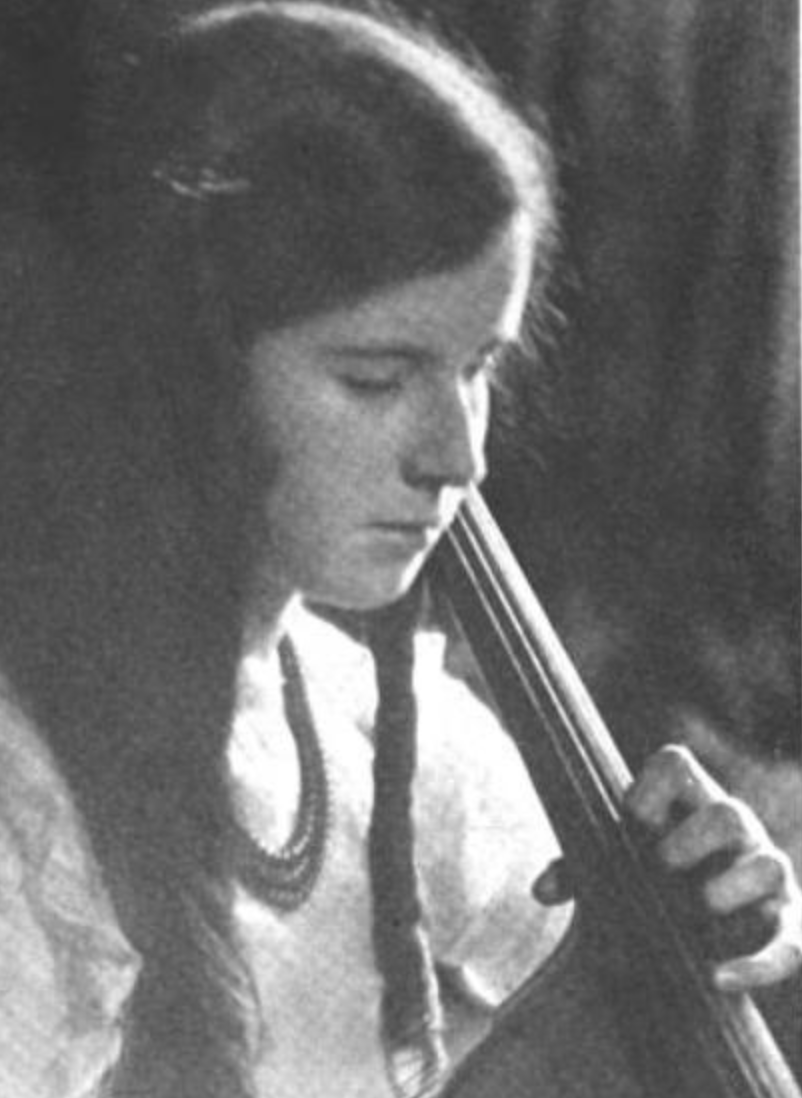
- Flori Gough, from a 1917 publication
- Born: Florence Agnes Gough; April 8, 1905; Honolulu, Hawaii.
- Died: January 30, 1992 (aged 86); San Francisco, California, U.S.
- Occupations: Cellist, music educator
- Spouse: Lev Shorr

Florence "Flori" Agnes Gough Shorr (April 8, 1905 – January 30, 1992) was an American cellist on the faculty of the San Francisco Conservatory of Music. She played cello with the San Francisco Symphony and the Los Angeles Philharmonic, and later in life played viola and cello with the Pittsburgh Symphony Orchestra.

== Early life and education ==
Gough was born in Honolulu and raised in San Francisco, the daughter of James A. Gough and Margaret Kennedy Gough. She studied cello with Stanisłas Bem, and began giving recitals as a girl. She studied with Vincent d'Indy at the Conservatoire de Paris, where she was the first American cellist to win the Premiere Prix, when she graduated with first honors in 1924.

Her older brother Walter Louis Gough was a violinist and violin teacher in San Francisco.

== Career ==
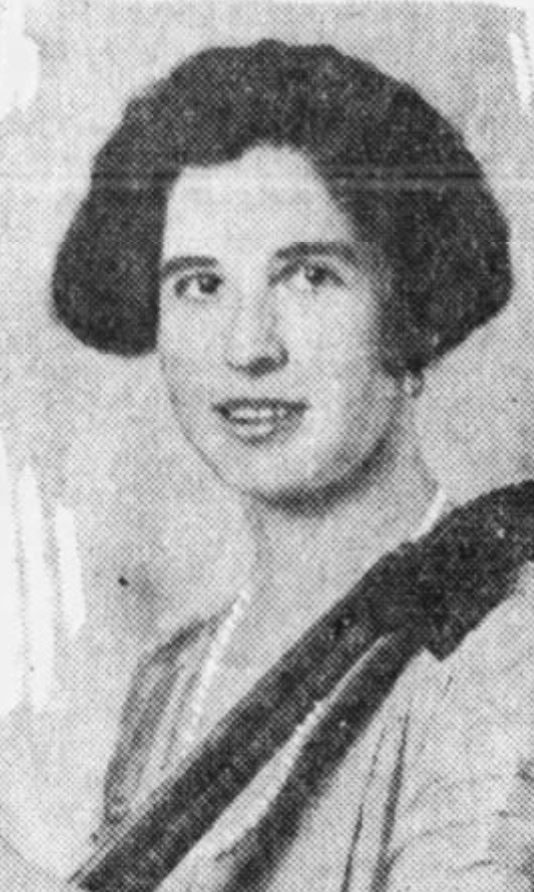
Flori Gough, from a 1925 newspaper

Gough played in recitals beginning in the 1910s. "Her talent is still in the bud, but the color and texture of its full-blown perfection can easily be foretold," wrote a newspaper reviewer of her skill in 1918. She was heard on radio concerts from the 1920s. From 1929 to 1934, Gough was head of the cello department at the San Francisco Conservatory of Music. She performed with the San Francisco Symphony and the Abas Quartet. She gave her New York debut accompanied by her pianist husband in 1934, in two concerts at Town Hall.

Gough was based in Los Angeles in midlife. She played for NBC Radio, with the Los Angeles Philharmonic, and with the South Bay Civic Symphony. In the 1960s, she played cello and viola with the Pittsburgh Symphony Orchestra. She toured with the Pittsburgh Symphony in 1966, in a program highlighting the women in the orchestra. Her forced retirement at age 70 was one of the grievances in the Pittsburgh Symphony's musician strike in 1975; she played cello at the strikers' five-hour fundraiser concert.

== Personal life ==
Flori Gough married a fellow musician, Russian pianist Lev Shorr, in 1930. Later that year, she fell seriously ill with pneumonia. She was injured in a fatal car accident in 1932. The Shorrs divorced in 1936. She lived in Los Angeles in the 1940s and 1950s, in Pennsylvania in the 1960s and 1970s, and in Arizona in the 1980s. She died in 1992, at the age of 86, in San Francisco.
