= Sebastiano Flori =

Italian painter

Sebastiano Flori (active 1545) was an Italian painter active in Rome and Umbria. Sebastiano was a pupil of Giorgio Vasari and he painted with him in the large frescoes in the Palazzo della Cancelleria in Rome. The specific room where Flori assisted Vasari was the Sala dei Cento Giorni (Hall of the Hundred Days), commissioned in March 1546 by Cardinal Alessandro Farnese to celebrate the life of his grandfather, Pope Paul III. The hall takes its name from Vasari’s claim that he and his assistants completed the entire fresco cycle in only 100 days, prompting Michelangelo to remark upon the rapid execution: “Si vede” (“One can see”). The frescoes are executed in the Mannerist style and represent one of Vasari’s major Roman commissions. Flori is listed among Vasari’s better-known pupils alongside Bartolomeo Carducci and Mirabello Cavalori. He also frescoed in the church of San Francesco, Terni.

== Gallery ==
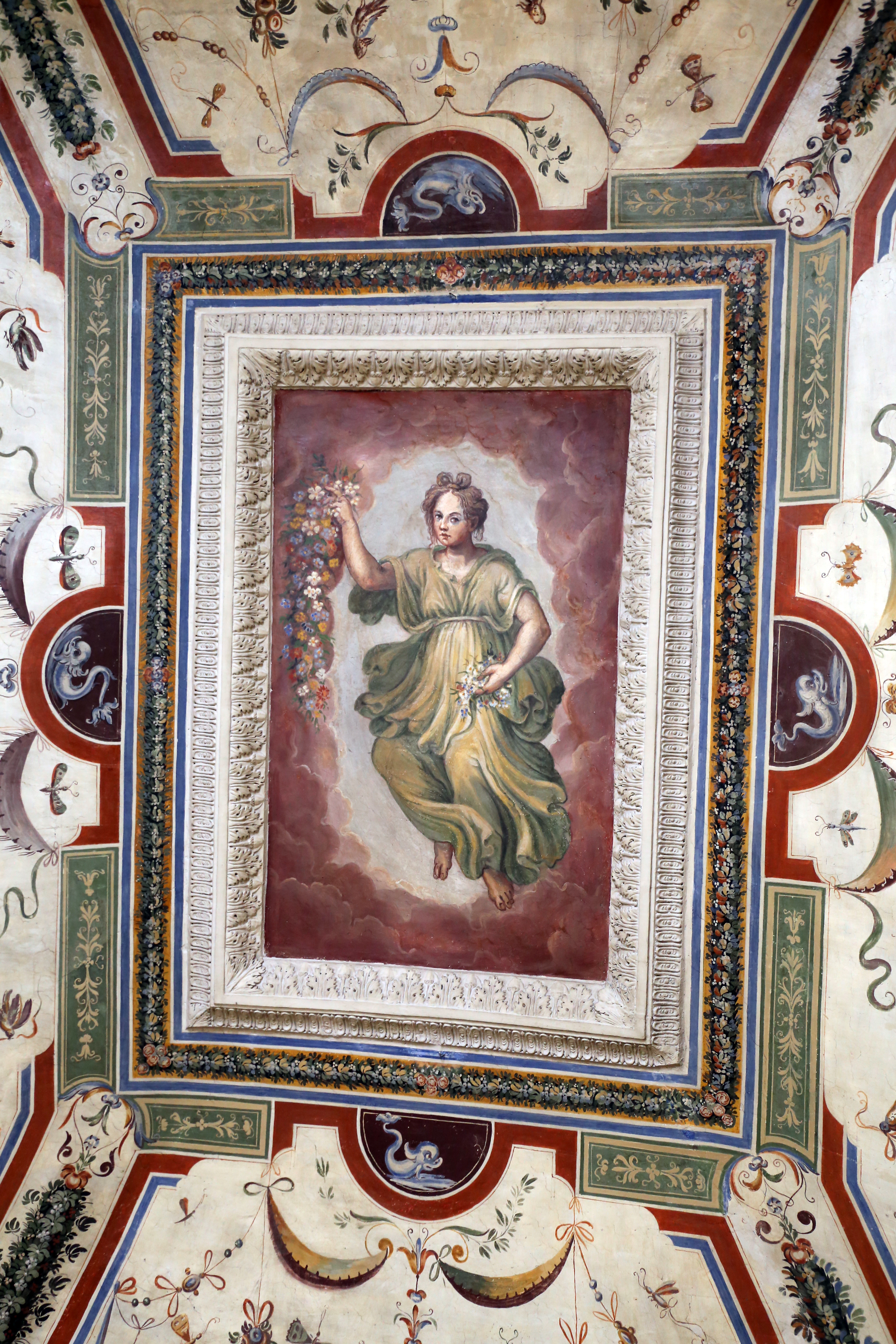
Sala di Flora, circa 1575-80

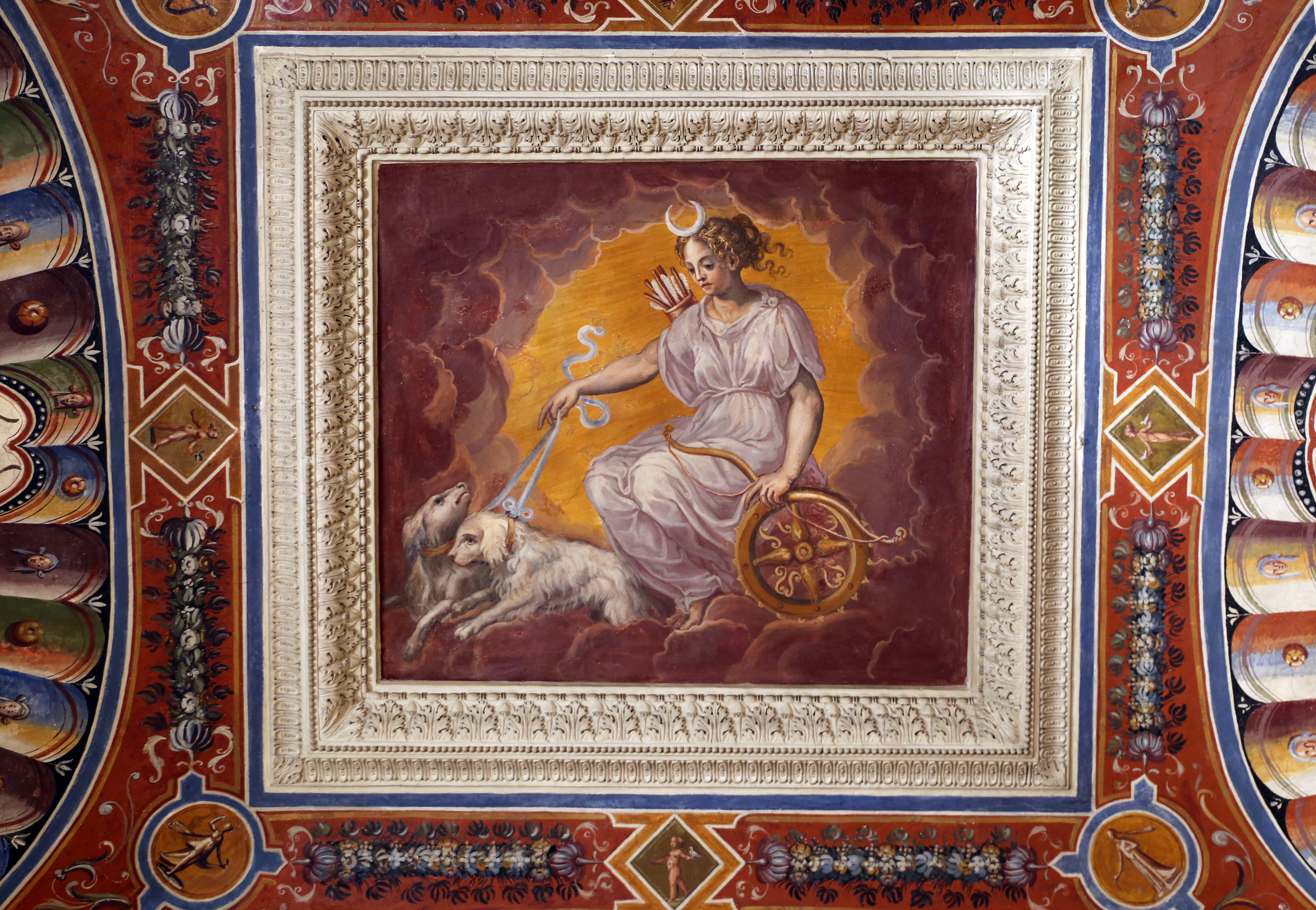
Sala di Artemide

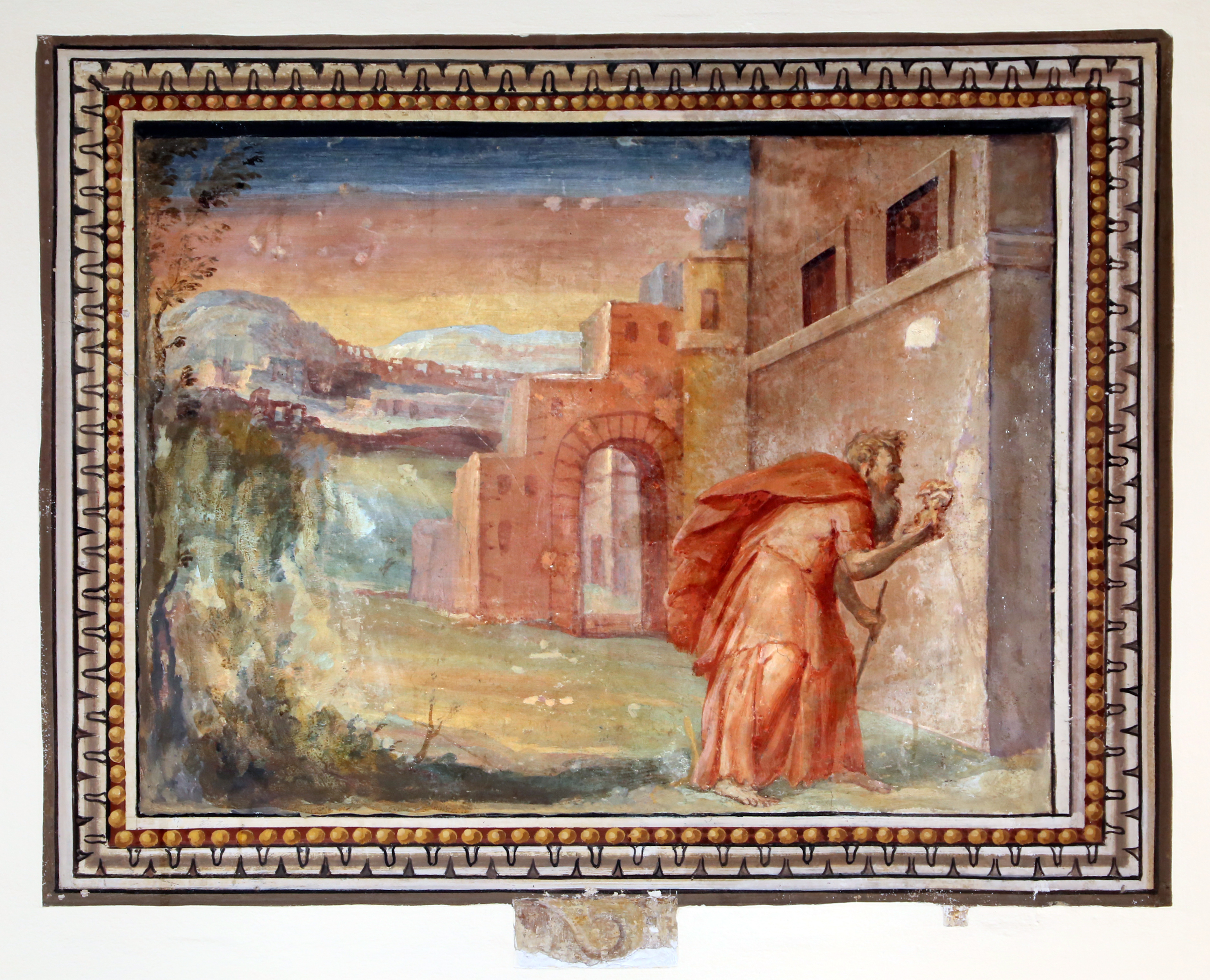
Storie di Abramo

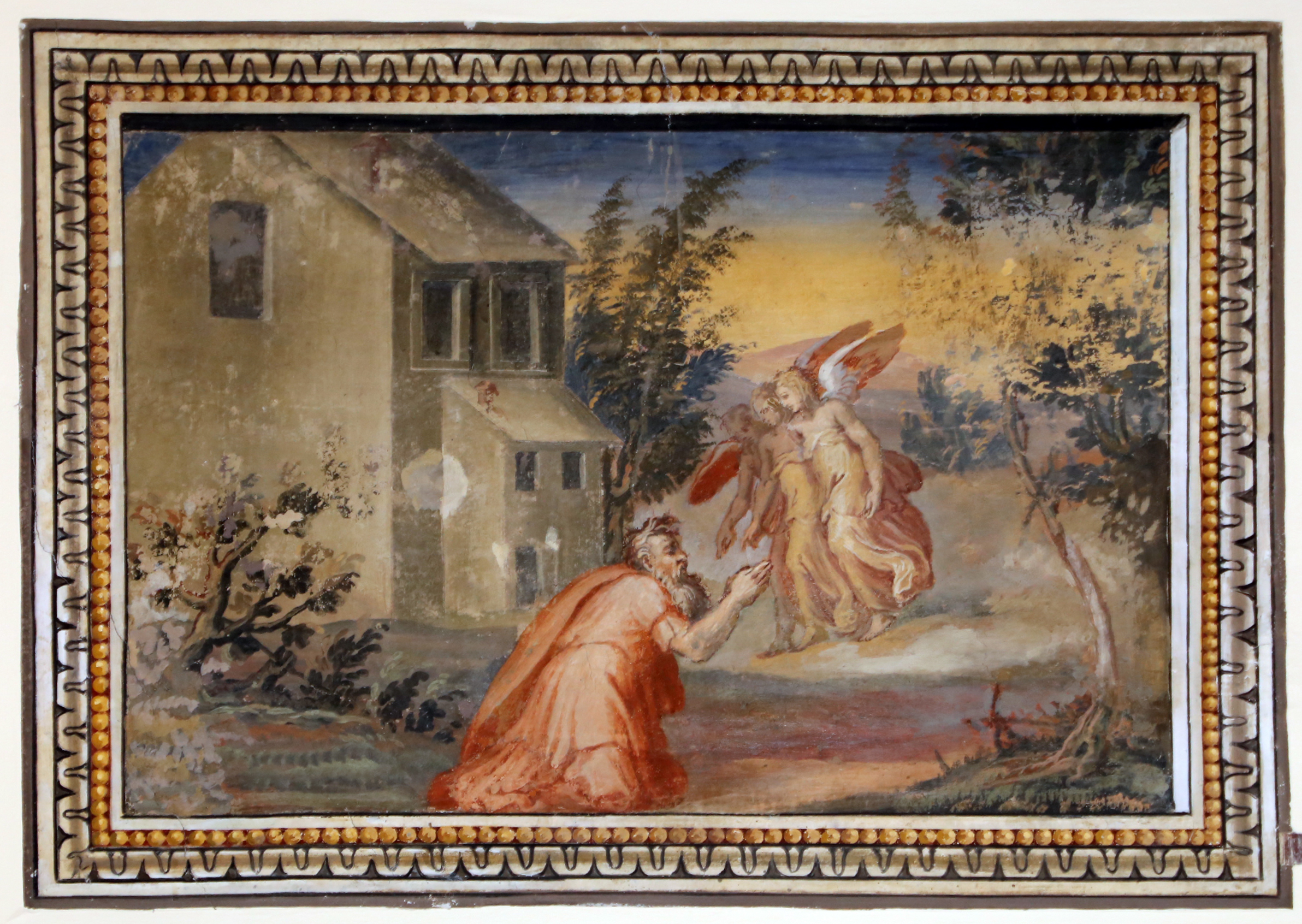
Tre Angeli

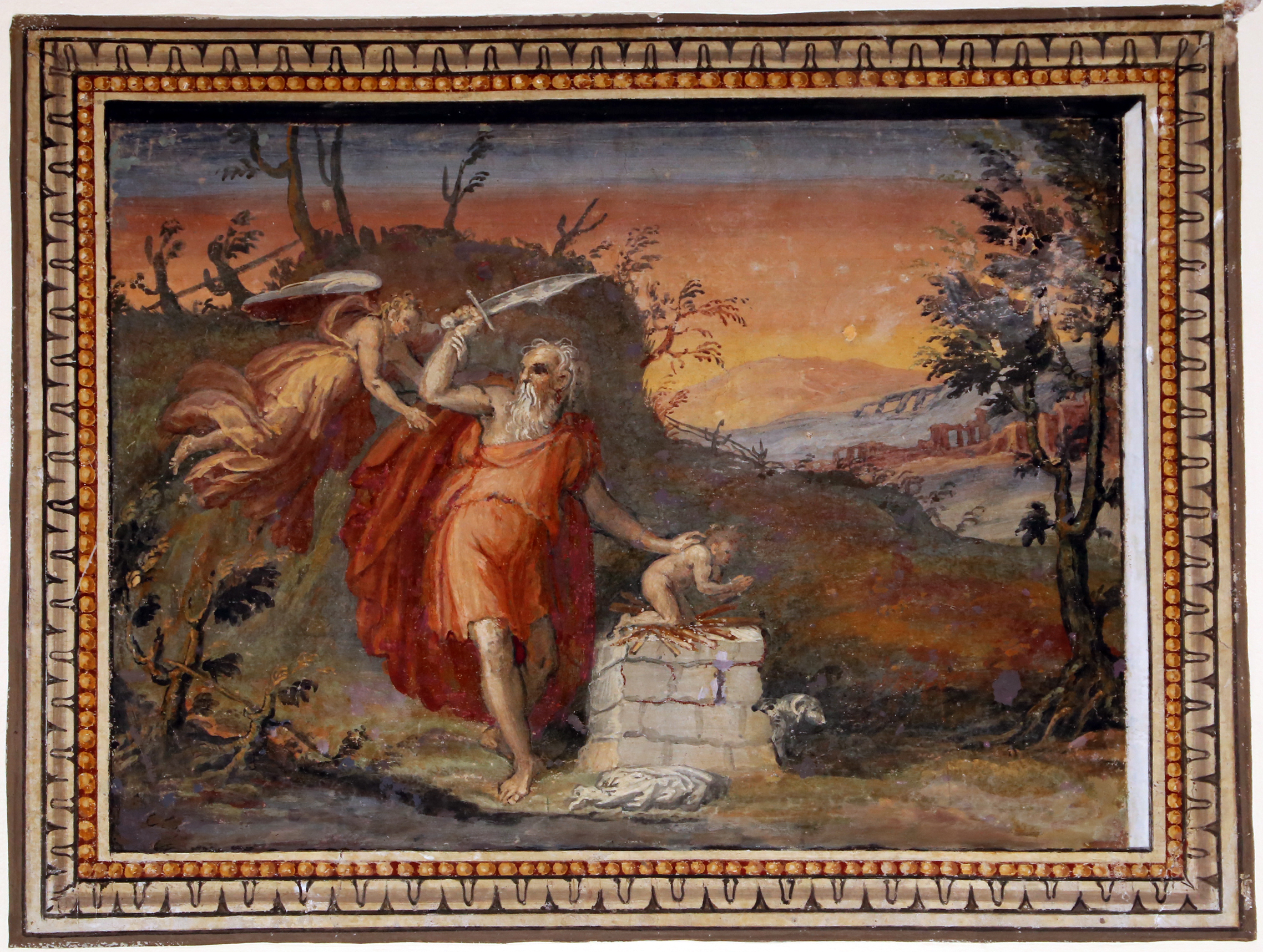
Sacrifcio di Isacco
