= Sant'Andrea, Spello =

Church in Spello, Umbria, Italy

Coordinates: 42°59′26″N 12°40′18″E

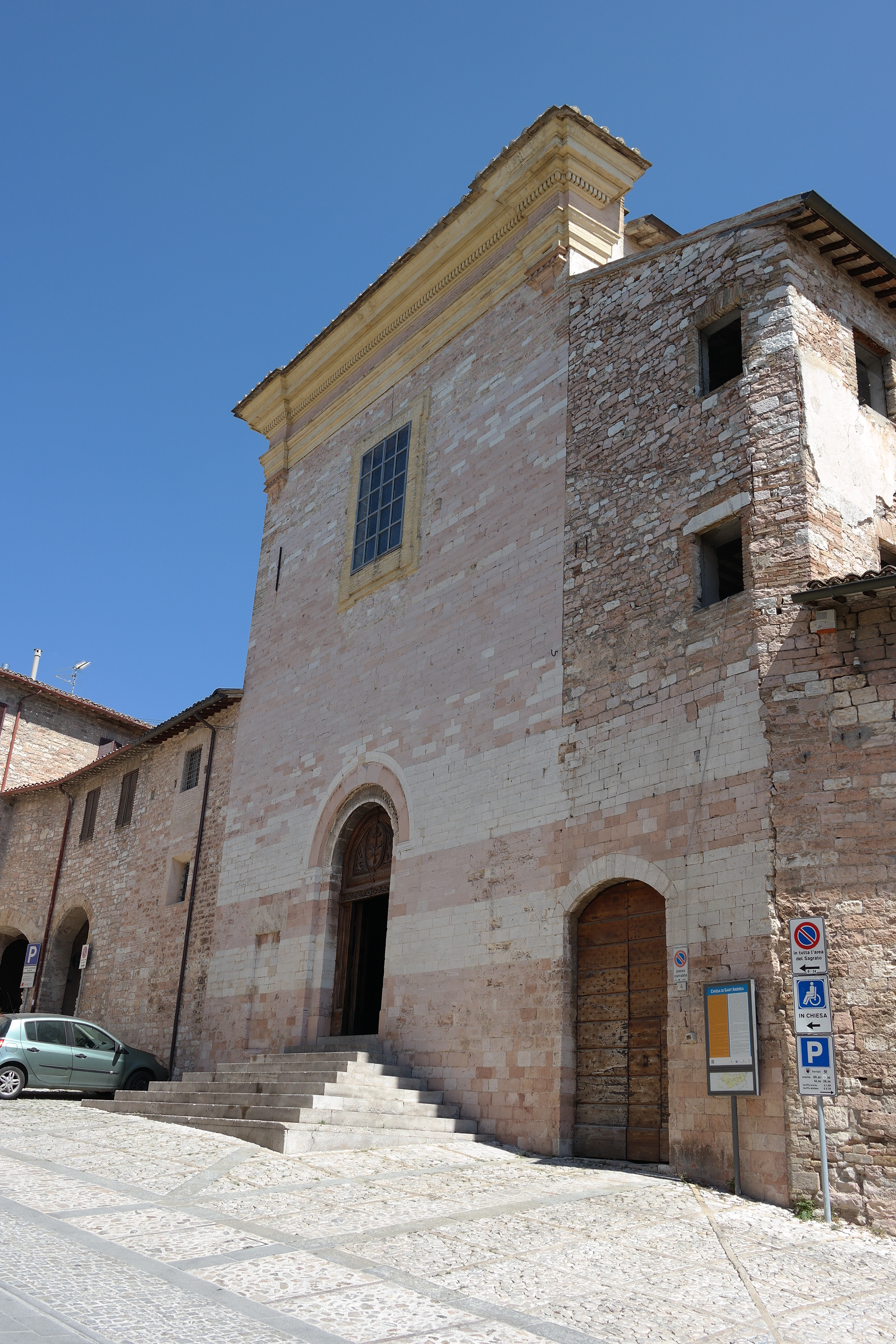
Facade

Sant’Andrea is a 14th-century church located in Spello, province of Perugia, region of Umbria, Italy.

== History ==
A church at this site is documented since 1025, as belonging to Camaldolese monks from the former monastery of San Silvestro, once located in the frazione of Collepino on the slopes of Monte Subasio. In the 13th century, the church came under the rule of the bishop of Spoleto, who then granted it and surrounding farms, to monks of the Franciscan order. In 1254, Pope Innocent IV, and again in 1256 Pope Alexander IV, confirmed these grants. In 1258, the latter pope granted indulgences to be offered over ten years to help pay for the erection of the monastery. The monastery was aided by its affiliation with the blessed Andrea Caccioli (1194-1254), who had been one of the original novices under St Francis, and had been the earliest leader of this monastery. In 1360, the blessed monk was proclaimed a "co-patron" of the town, although he did not get cultus confirmation by the Vatican until 1738, and has never been beatified.

The church and convent have undergone many refurbishments over the centuries. The latter was twice secularized: once by the French occupation in 1810, and again in 1860 and 1866, when it became an orphanage for girls. The Franciscan order returned in 1982 to restore the monastery.

== Interior Artworks ==
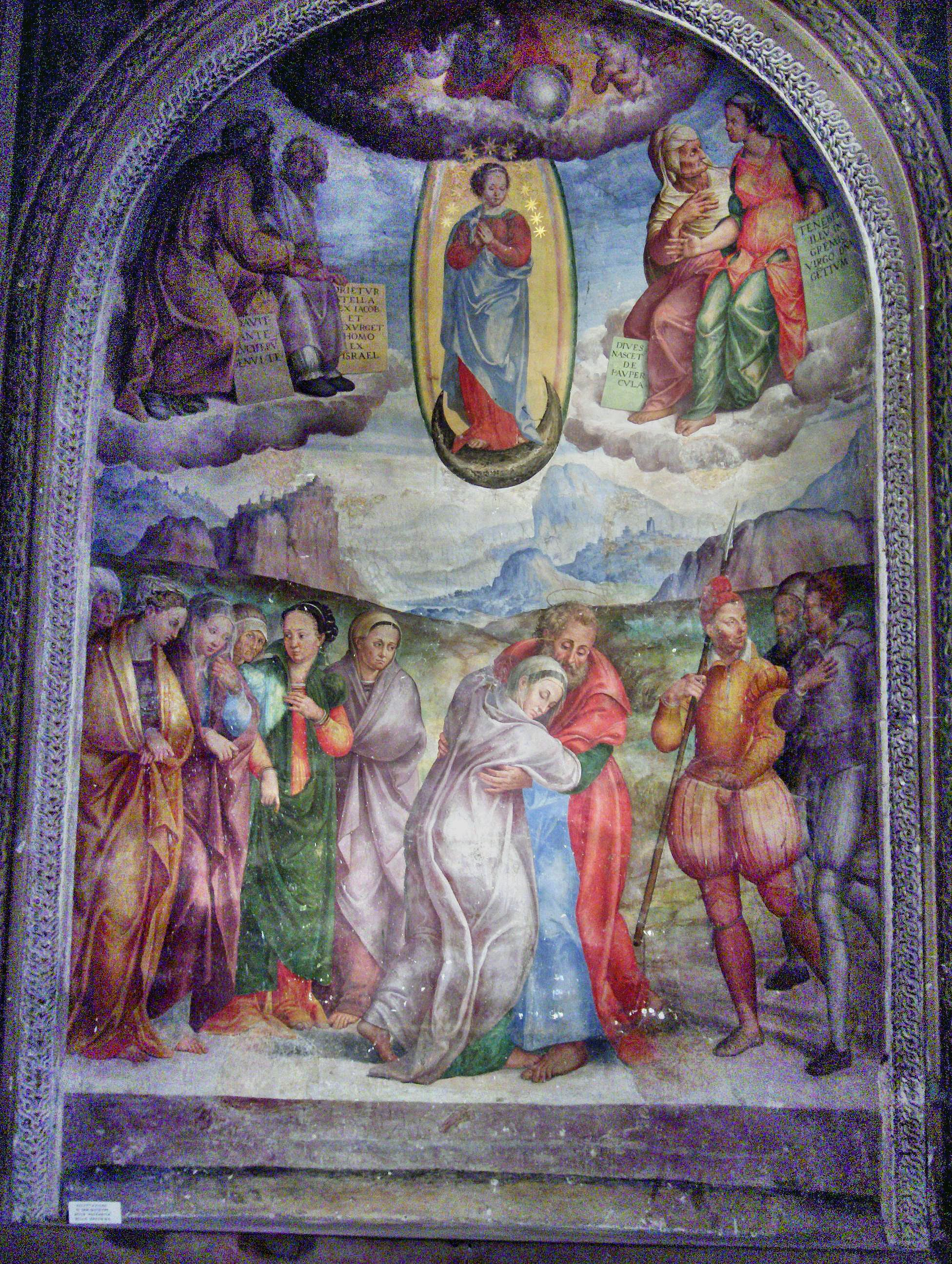
Meeting of Saints Joachim and Anne by Dono Doni

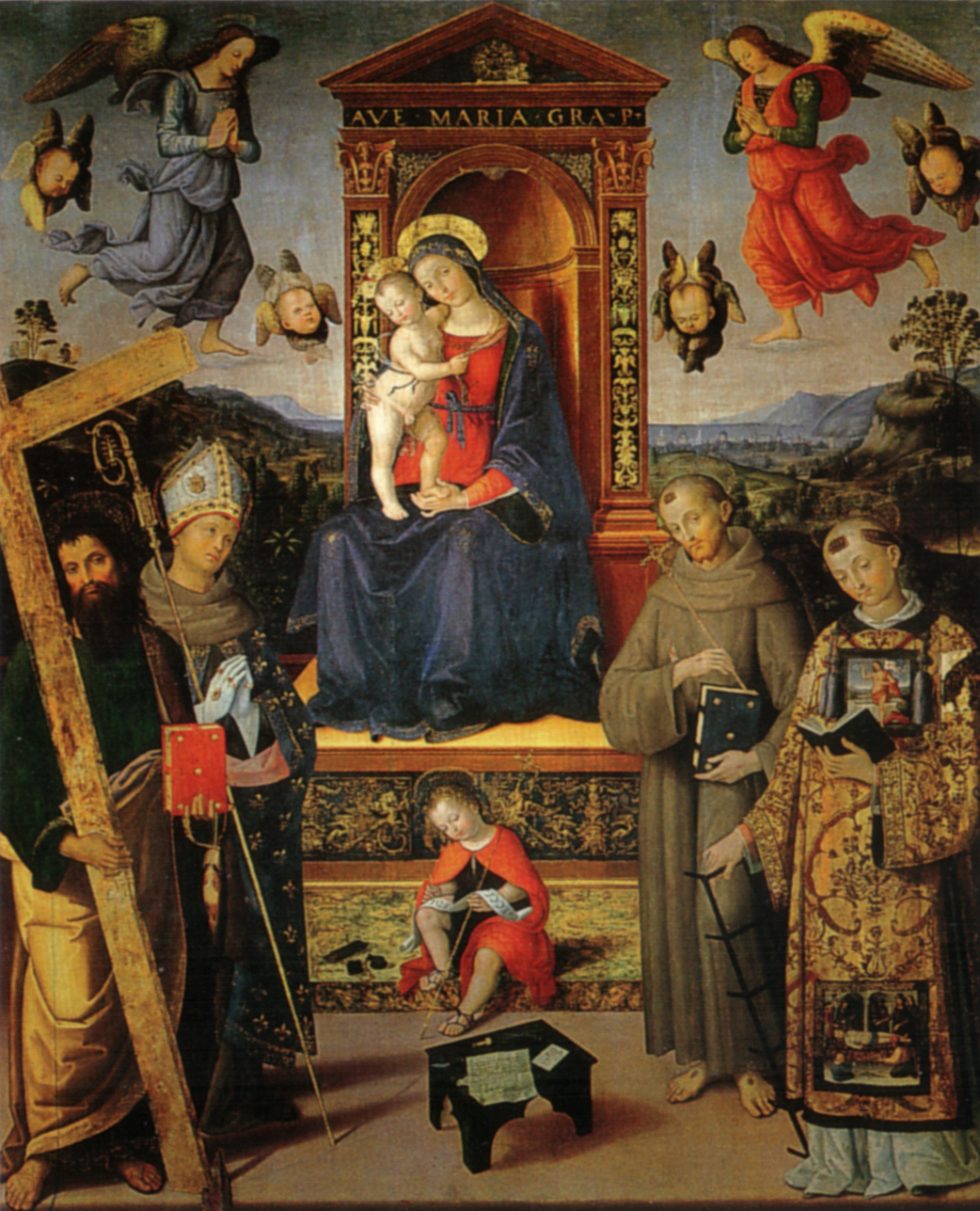
"Enthroned Madonna and Child with Saints by Pinturicchio and followers

- St Francis in 16th century marble aedicule (wooden icon on right entry wall)
- Madonna and Child with Saints Anne, Roch and Nicola of Bari (1532, right wall) by Tommaso Corbo
- Meeting of Saints Joachim and Anne (1565, right wall) attributed to Dono Doni
- Madonna and Child (first half of 14th century, nich on right wall.
- Madonna and Child, Saints Lawrence, Francis, Ludovico, Sant'Andrea Apostle, and a young John the Baptist (1507-1508) by Pinturicchio with the help of Eusebio da San Giorgio and Giovanni di Francesco Ciambella
- Ecstasy of St Anthony (17th century, Chapel of St Anthony of Padua)
- Blessed Franciscan (1662, Chapel of St Anthony of Padua) by follower of Giovanni Battista Pacetti

Wooden intaglio choir (17th century, apse)

- Twelve apostles (1913, apse) by Benvenuto Crispoldi
- Crucifixion (circa 1400, apse) by follower of Giotto

Funeral Urn of Blessed Andrea Caccioli (17th century, Chapel of St Francis)

- Miracle of the Blessed Andrea Caccioli in Reggio Emilia (1610, Chapel of St Francis) by Cesare Sermei
- Blessed Beata Veronica Giuliani (17th century, Fresco in chapel of St Anthony)

Other frescoes in the Chapel of St Anthony include a Madonna and child with Angels (14th century) by the school of Cola Petruccioli and an Enthroned Madonna and Child with St Anthony abbot and St James the Pilgrim and Donors (14th century) by the Master of Santa Giuliana

In the chapel of the Holy Sacrament are 20th century paintings by Benvenuto Crispoldi and a fresco of the Madonna and Child with Saints Catherine and Lucy (16th century) by followers of Ascensidonio Spacca and frescoes by followers of Mazzaforte

The Convent is under restoration. It has had some frescoes (late 17th century) attributed to Carlo Lamparelli and a canvas depicting St Ursula attributed to Sebastiano Conca.
