= Spello =

- Comune
- Comune di Spello
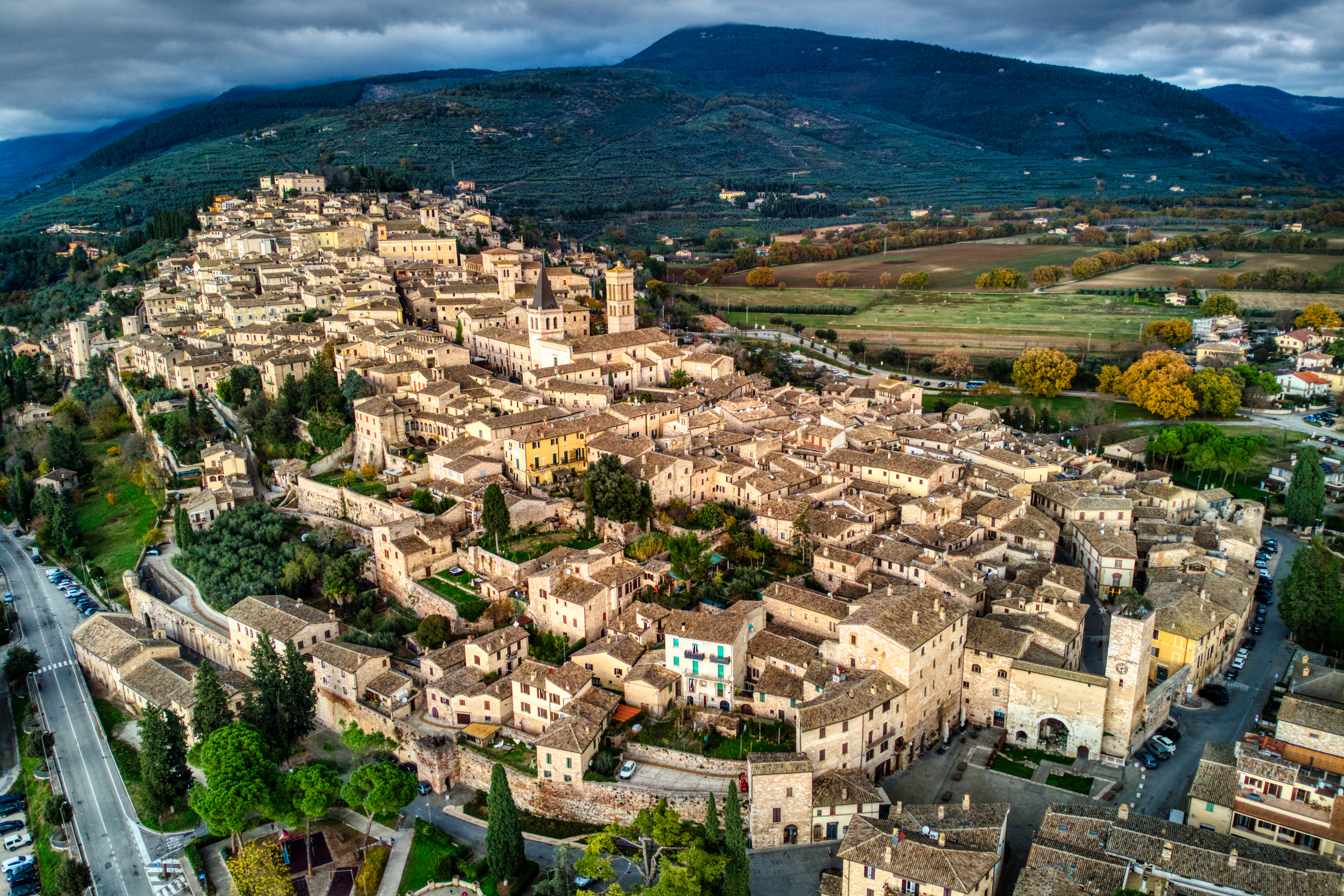
- Panorama of Spello

- Location within Italy Location within Umbria
- Coordinates: 42.992112°N 12.671063°E
- Country: Italy
- Region: Umbria
- Province: Perugia (PG)

Government
  - Mayor: Moreno Landrini

Area
  - Total: 61 km^{2} (24 sq mi)
- Elevation: 280 m (920 ft)

Population (1 January 2025)
  - Total: 8,210
  - Density: 130/km^{2} (350/sq mi)
- Demonym: Spellani
- Time zone: UTC+1 (CET)
  - Summer (DST): UTC+2 (CEST)
- Postal code: 06038
- Dialing code: 0742
- Patron saint: St. Felix
- Saint day: May 18
- Website: Official website

Spello (in Antiquity: Hispellum) is an ancient town and comune (township) of Italy, in the province of Perugia in eastern-central Umbria, on the lower southern flank of Monte Subasio. It is 6 km (4 mi) north-northwest of Foligno and 10 km (6 mi) south-southeast of Assisi. It is one of I Borghi più belli d'Italia ("The most beautiful villages of Italy").

The old walled town lies on a regularly northwest–southeast sloping ridge that eventually meets the plain. From the top of the ridge, Spello commands a good view of the Umbrian plain towards Perugia; at the bottom of the ridge, the town extends beyond its walls into a small modern section (or borgo), served by the rail line from Rome to Florence via Perugia.

== History ==
=== Antiquity ===
Although no mention of Spello (Hispellum) is found before the Roman Empire, it was an important sacred place where Umbrian tribes gathered from at latest the 3rd c. BC as shown by archaeology. The sanctuary of Venus was first monumentalised in the Republican age (2nd-1st century BC).

Pliny, in his list of Umbrian towns, calls it a colony established under Augustus, a status also supported by numerous Roman inscriptions in which the town is named Colonia Iulia Hispellum. Augustus is said by Pliny to have granted Hispellum the spring and river Clitunno, although they lay 12 miles away, with the territories of Bevagna and Foligno in between; the people of Hispellum are also said to have maintained a bath and a hospice there. In the Roman period the town belonged to the Lemonia gens.

A well-known rescript of Emperor Constantine the Great, together with the Caesars Constantine and Constans, ordered that the city be called Flavia Constante, that a temple of the Flavia gens be erected there, and that gladiatorial and circus games be instituted. The temple was most likely that found recently in the sanctuary of Venus. From that period, inscriptions refer to the town as Colonia Urbana Flavia, a wording which, according to the source, led some writers to incorrectly suppose that Spello had received a second colonial foundation under Vespasian.

Christianity was preached in the town from an early date. By the 3rd century Spello is recorded as an episcopal see. Its first bishop is given as Saint Felix, martyred under Diocletian and Maximian and later regarded as the city's protector. A second bishop, Saint Epiphanius, took part in the Roman synod held in 487 by Pope Felix III. A third, Venerius, attended a synod in Rome called by Pope Symmachus between the 5th and 6th centuries.

=== Middle Ages ===
In the 13th century Spello formed part of the Duchy of Spoleto and was under the Papal States. It was repeatedly chosen as the seat of the court, and archival records from the same period note the presence of a chief magistrate and a deputy.

In the early 13th century Emperor Otto IV, while taking many places from the Church, is said to have shown clemency towards Spello, which in that century was a loyal ally of Perugia. In 1289 the city again asked to be received under Perugian protection and to be sent a new podestà chosen by Perugia’s council; Perugia complied by sending Porticcio di Porta Borgne. In 1298 the people of Spello appealed to Perugia for help against the vicar of the Duke of Spoleto, then Bertoldo Orsini, who had proclaimed war against Spello, claiming it was subject to the duchy, whereas Spello had placed itself under Perugian protection. Perugia sent ambassadors to Spoleto and, together with Nocera, repeatedly sent envoys to Rome asking the pope to intervene to settle the dispute.

In 1358 Gil Albornoz ordered the construction of a fortress and added a new stretch of walls. In that same context, he carried out a legal and administrative reordering in Spello in accordance with wider reforms being implemented across the Papal State.

From the 14th century the town's political life included two councils, a chancellor, and a chief magistrate, who oversaw town leaders, the militia, councils, and offices, and held full authority over justice. Over time, however, the chief magistrate's powers were increasingly constrained by oversight from the papal vicar or governor.

Factional conflict, especially between Guelphs and Ghibellines, troubled Spello, particularly in the 14th century and during the Western Schism, when the town withdrew from obedience to the legate of Perugia. After the schism ended and Martin V recovered the Church's territories, Spello returned to papal rule; on 17 September 1424 its capitoli were signed at Deruta, where the cardinal legate had relocated from Perugia because of an epidemic.

From the 14th century Spello sought Perugia's backing against Foligno, and a pact of submission required that the chief magistrate be Perugian. In the course of subsequent factional shifts, rule passed in turn through Braccio Fortebracci, the Visconti, Ceccolino Michelotti, and again Braccio Fortebracci da Montone. After Braccio’s death in 1424, Spello returned to direct control by the Church.

On 16 February 1449 Pope Nicholas V granted Spello in fief to Nello Baglioni of Perugia.

=== Early Modern and contemporary eras ===
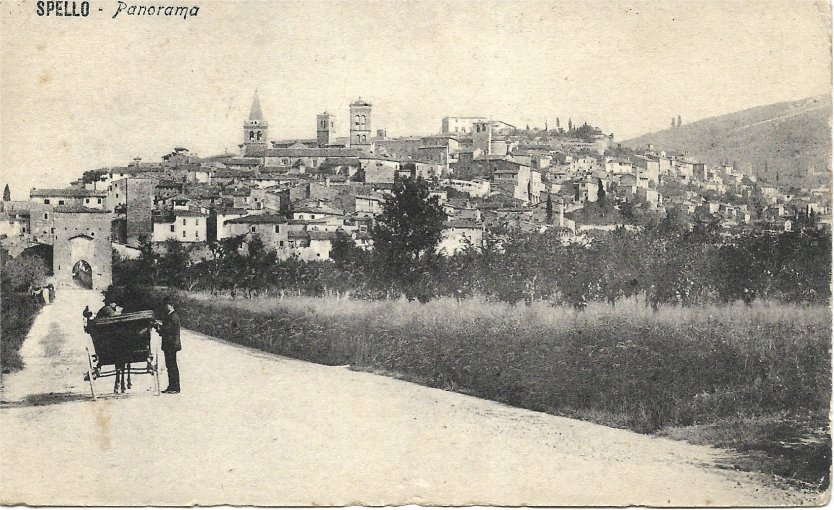
Spello in 1919

In 1527, after the Sack of Rome, Philibert, Prince of Orange, marched toward Perugia to expel Malatesta Baglioni and camped at Spello; the town was sacked by soldiers and killings of inhabitants are reported.

During the Perugian War in 1534 under Paul III, the pope ordered the walls and towers of Spello to be dismantled. After the Baglioni line died out in the 16th century, Gregory XIII recovered Spello and nearby Bastia for the Church, and they thereafter remained dependent on it.

In the early 17th century central papal authorities exercised growing influence over Spello through the Sacred Consulta and the Congregation of Good Government.

In 1774 Clement XIV detached Spello from the Diocese of Spoleto and incorporated it into the Diocese of Foligno.

After the Napoleonic period Spello became part of the Delegation of Perugia. Municipal statutes were abolished, and institutional offices were paired with church deputies tasked with safeguarding the interests of the Church. In 1828 Spello was made a city by a papal brief issued by Pope Leo XII.

On 9 November 1860 a plebiscite recorded overwhelming support for the unification of Italy.

In 1895 Spello had a population of 4,932 inhabitants.

== Geography ==
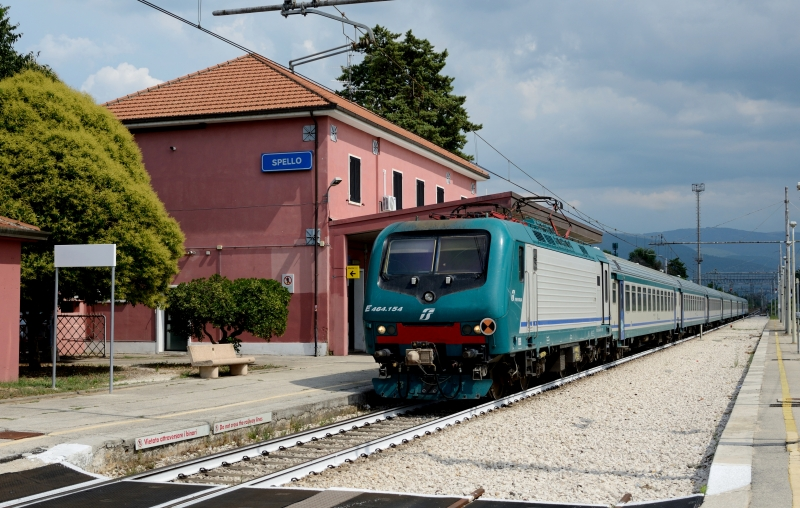
Train station in Spello

Spello lies on the southernmost slope of Monte Subasio, about 4 kilometres (2.5 mi) from Foligno and about 11 kilometres (6.8 mi) from Assisi, at an average elevation of 314 metres (1,030 ft) above sea level. A road from Foligno toward Florence passes by the open square in front of Porta Maggiore.

Its streets are described as steep throughout. The town is reported as having a temperate climate, with prevailing winds from the south and east.

Among Spello's features are thirteen caves of uncertain but ancient date, opening on the slope of the hill on which the town stands, on the north and west sides. One of these caves communicates with the highest point of the hill, where the seat of the ancient acropolis is suggested to have been located.

=== Subdivisions ===
The municipality includes the localities of Acquatino, Capitan Loreto, Collepino, Crocefisso, Limiti, Navello, Ponte Chiona, San Giovanni, Spello.

In 2021, 2,429 people lived in rural dispersed dwellings not assigned to any named locality. At the time, the most populous localities were Spello proper (4,116), and Capitan Loreto (1,027).

== Archeology ==
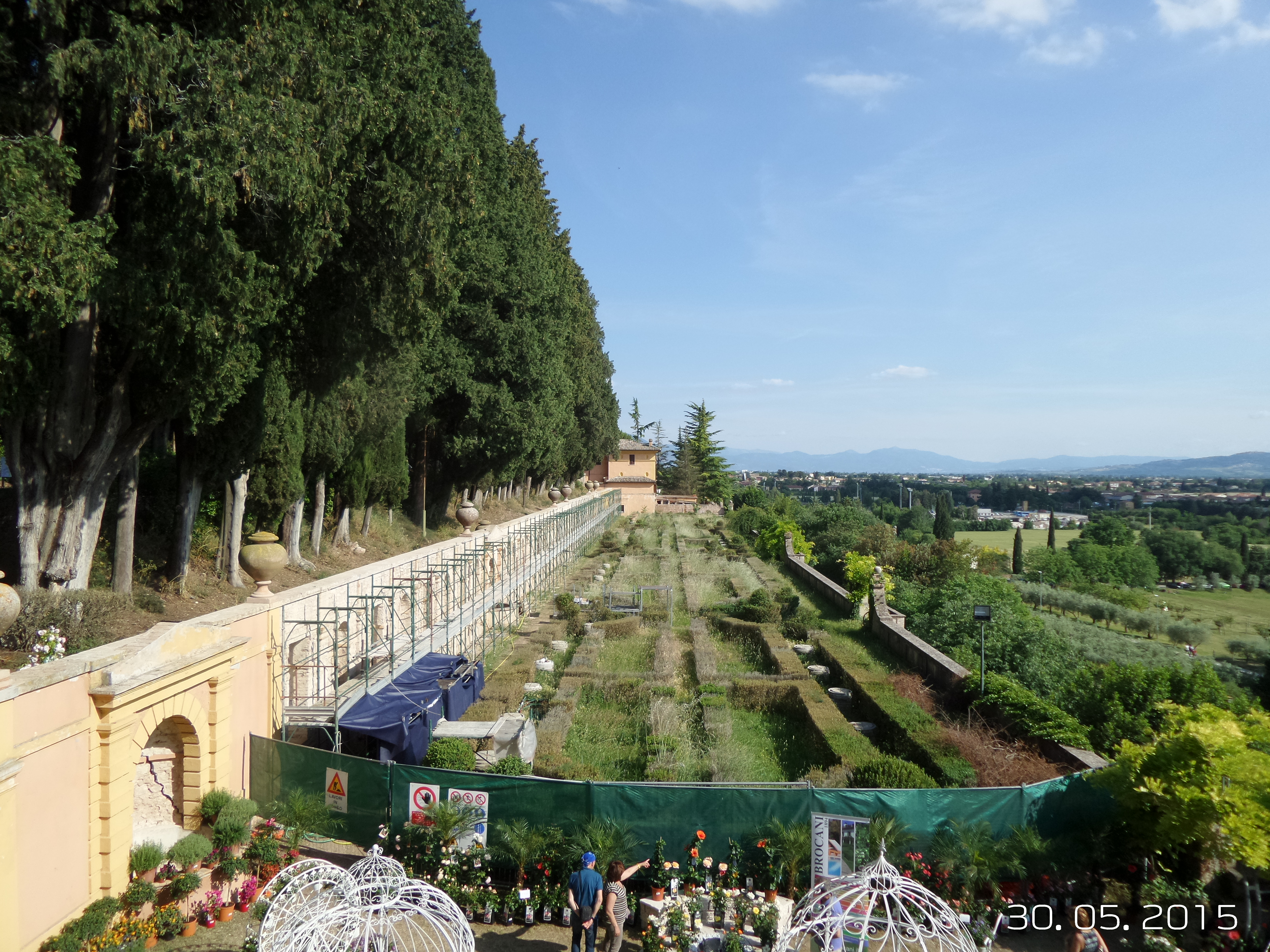
Terraces of the Sanctuary of Venus in the Villa Fidelia

Spello preserves extensive remains from the Roman period within and around the present town. A Roman road runs between the southern gate and the gate opposite the Church of San Ventura, and many archaeological remains along this route show that Roman Hispellum extended beyond the area of the modern settlement, occupying part of the adjoining plain near the road.

The town includes three Roman Late Antique gates (Porta Consolare, Porta di Venere and the "Arch of Augustus") and traces of three more. The town incorporated the remains of an amphitheatre.

The great Sanctuary of Venus on 3 terraces was incorporated into the present Villa Fidelia.

=== Roman walls and gates ===
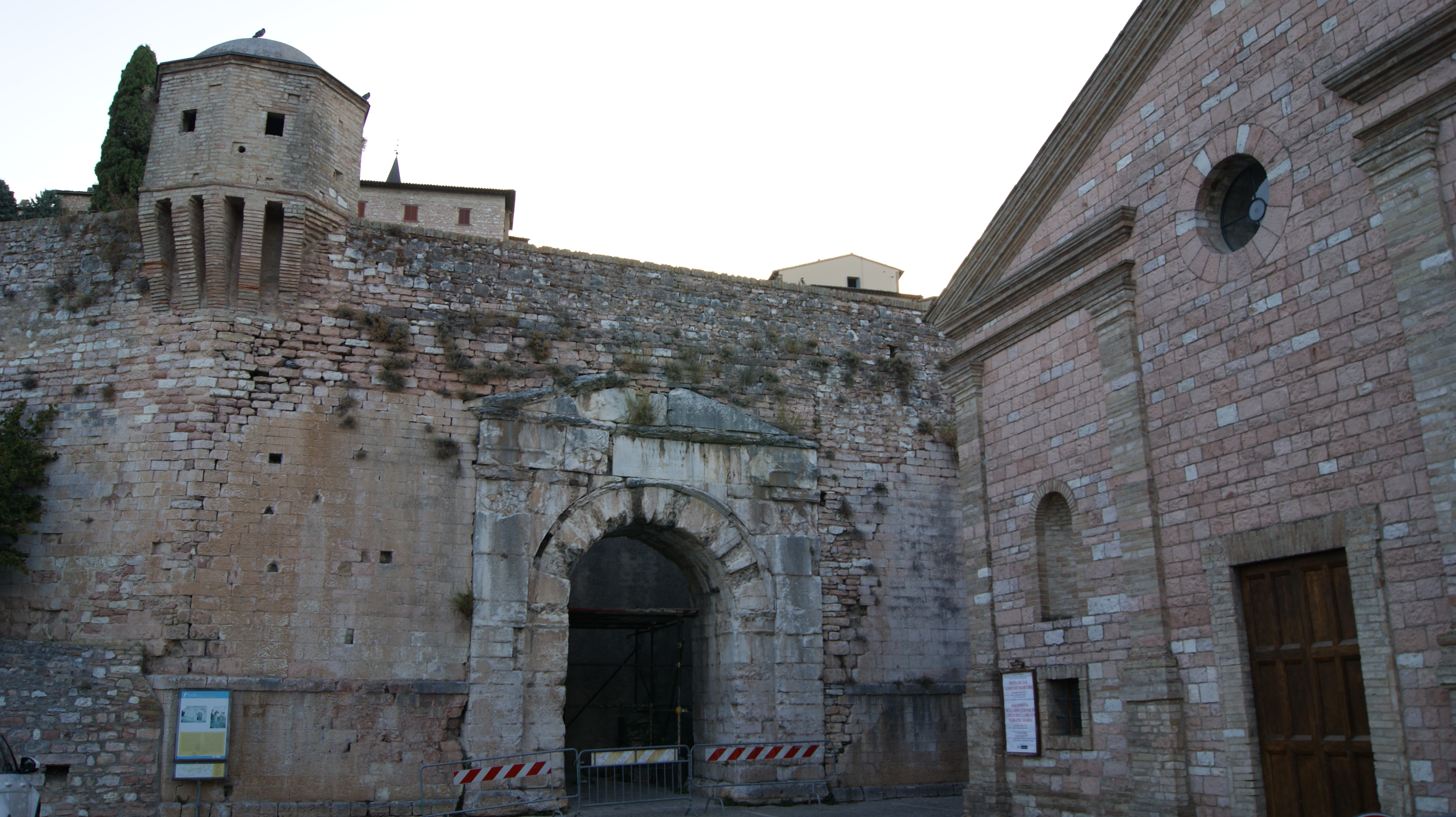
Porta Urbica

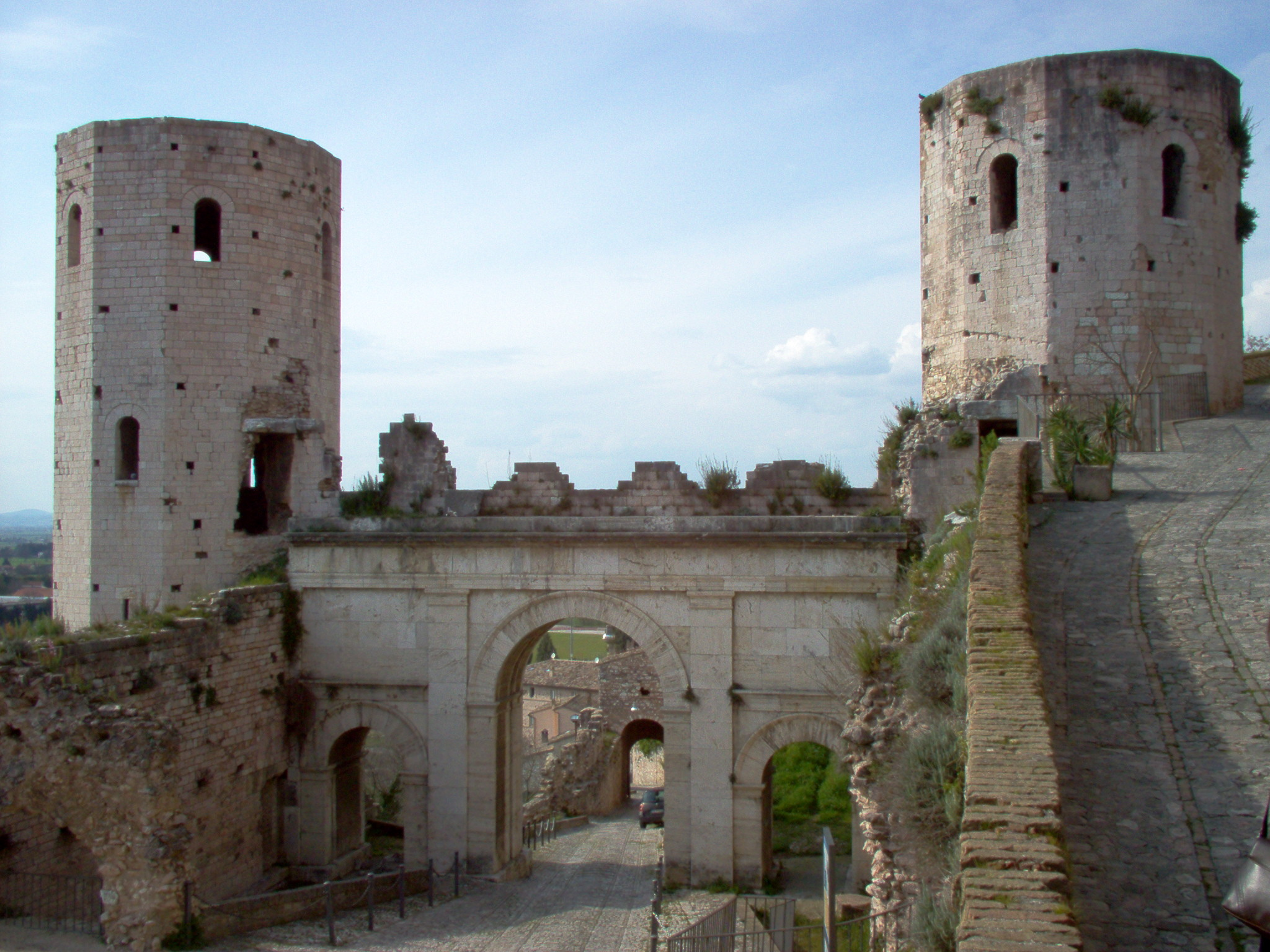
Porta di Venere

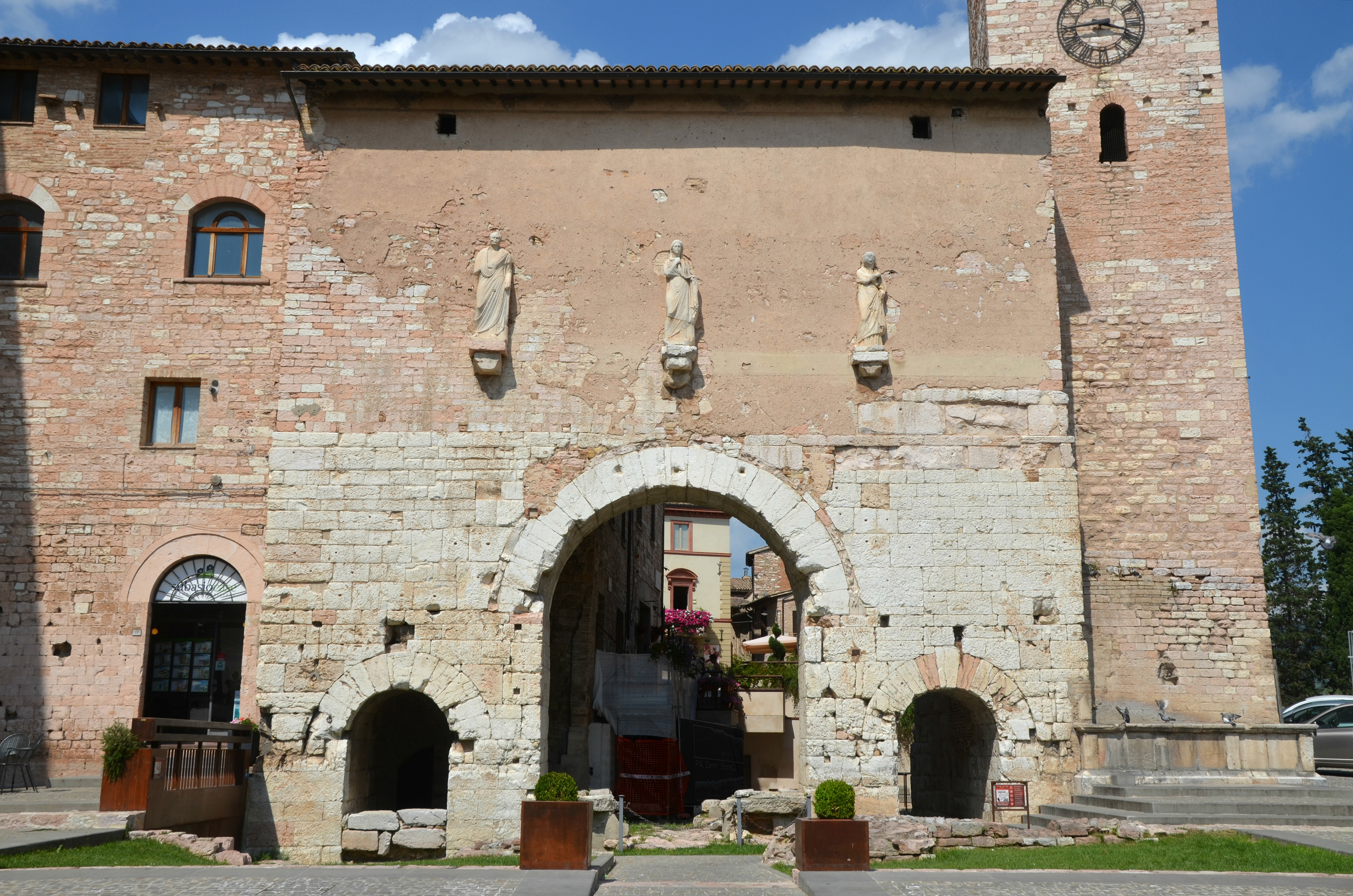
Porta Consolare

Spello's Roman walls survive for a considerable stretch, built of carefully squared and fitted limestone blocks laid in parallelepiped courses. They are visible along much of the lower part of the town, including the southern side, and are more extensively preserved on the west, where traces of a rectangular tower remain.

Three ancient gates open through these walls. The central gate, opposite the Church of San Ventura, is the most intact and has a single passage.

Porta Venere dates to the Augustan age and is built in the form of a triumphal arch. It is flanked by the two dodecagonal Towers of Propertius and is one of the town's most monumental survivals of Roman fortification architecture. The right-hand passage retains traces of the arch above it, and above this are a pilaster and part of a Tuscan-order entablature. The gate as a whole measures 10 metres (33 ft) in length.

Porta Consolare, dated to the 1st century BC, is the monumental gateway through which the Via Flaminia entered the town. It forms a key point of access to the historic center and is associated with the route that follows the line of the ancient rising street through the urban core. The gate also has three passages; in modern times three corbels were added there to support three marble statues found nearby, one representing a matron and the other two depicting municipal figures in togas.

Within the built-up area, in Via Giulia, there are remains of another ancient gate. In Via dei Cappuccini there are remains of the gate that led up to the Arx.

=== Belvedere and the Roman forum area ===
The Belvedere is an ancient terrace on which the Roman forum was built. From here there are views across the Topino valley and the line of hills stretching from Montefalco to Assisi.

=== Villa dei Mosaici ===
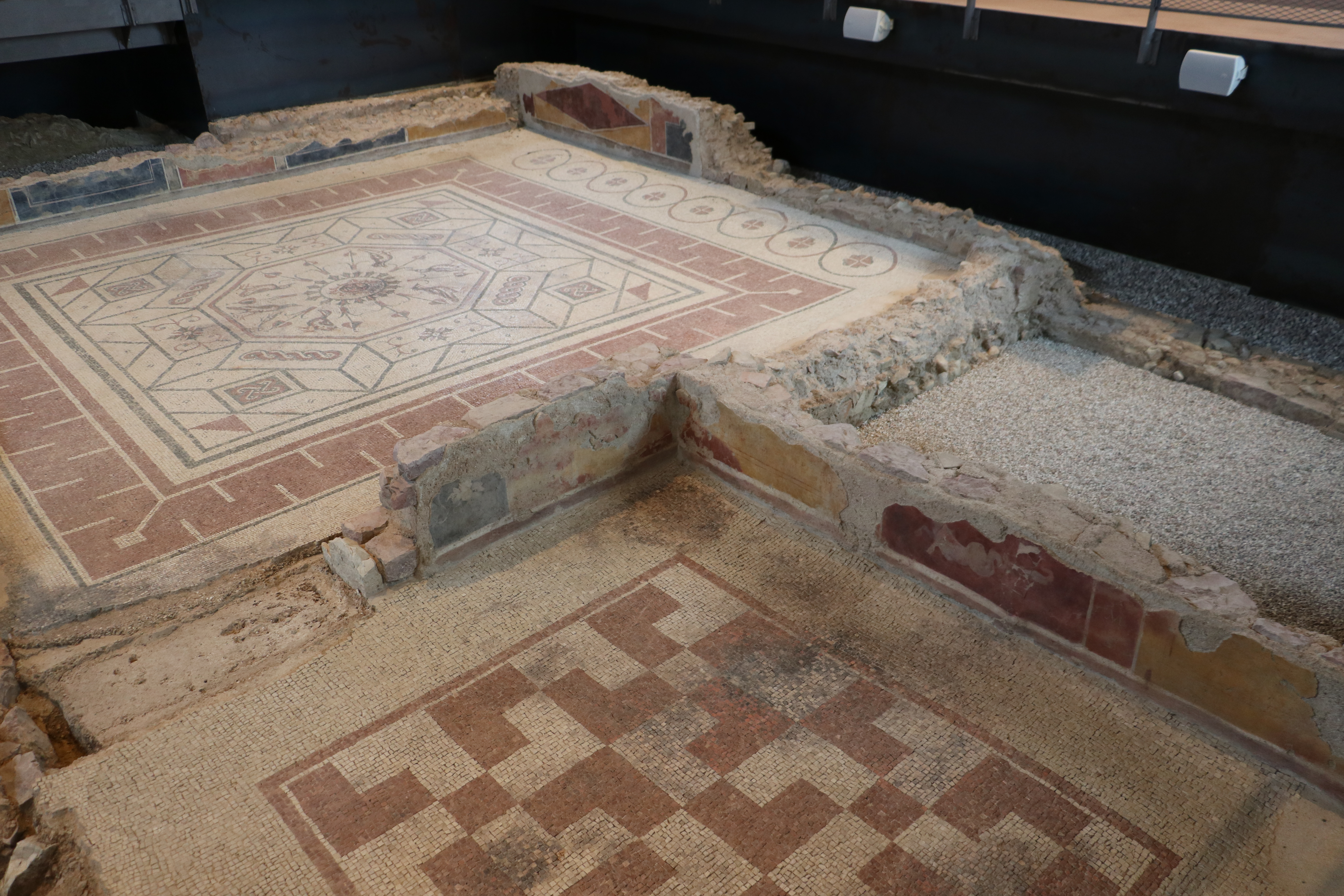
Villa dei Mosaici

The Villa dei Mosaici was uncovered in July 2005 just outside Spello's walls during works for a public car park. Excavation revealed a large Roman villa whose central sector covers about 500 square metres (5,400 sq ft). Of the twenty rooms brought to light, ten preserve polychrome mosaic floors with geometric and figurative motifs including human figures, animals, and fantastic creatures, while the entrance area has been lost.

The rooms are arranged around a peristyle, with spaces commonly identified by their mosaic themes, and an ample triclinium features a central scene of wine-mixing accompanied by personifications of the Seasons and figures linked to the Dionysian retinue. Two construction phases are noted: an Augustan phase and a later phase towards the end of the 2nd century AD.

=== Other ancient sites ===
On the left side of the Roman road, toward Perugia, ruins of several tombs remain, aligned along the roadside. Near the tomb remains are surviving traces of an amphitheatre. Opposite the Villa Tani Menicacci, along the same road, a large semicircular ruin survives, possibly belonging to the cavea of the ancient theatre.

Ancient aqueducts and baths are present, as well as an ornate arch honouring the emperor Macrinus.

Also noted are the ruins of the Sanctuary of Venus.

In the plain, near San Claudio, are the remains of a semi-excavated Roman amphitheater; and a small valley to the east of the town is remarkable for its traces of Roman centuriation.

An ancient Roman temple, dating to the 4th century AD, was discovered by researchers in 2023 underneath a carpark in Spello. According to Professor Douglas Boin, who announced the discovery at an Archaeological Society of America meeting in early 2024, the temple dates to Constantine's period and marks the transition of the Roman Empire to Christianity.

== Religious buildings and decorations ==
=== San Lorenzo ===
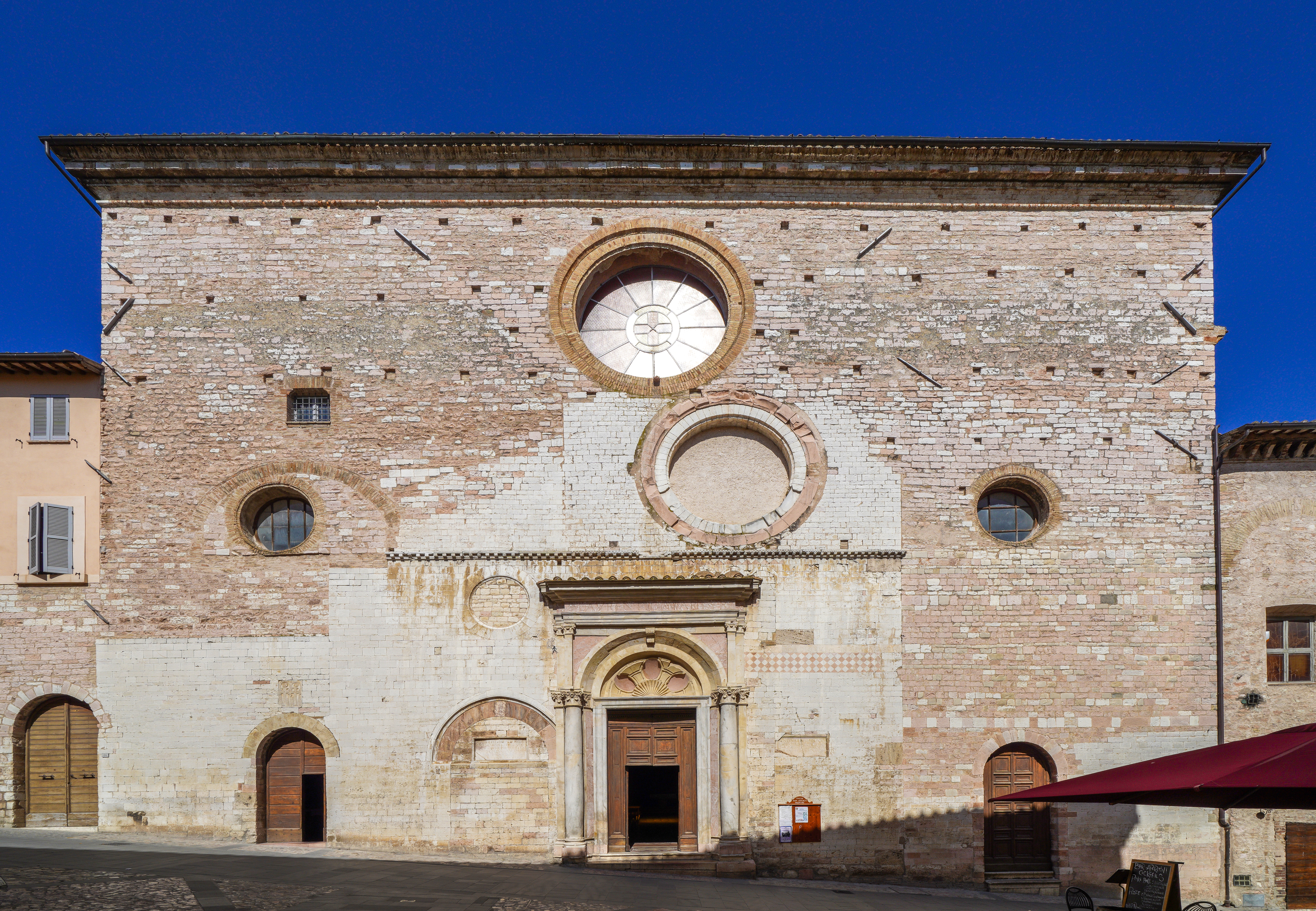
The façade of Church of San Lorenzo, showing its stratified masonry and prominent rose window

The church of San Lorenzo is one of Spello's two collegiate churches. It was consecrated in 1228 by Gregory IX, and it was believed to have been built over the remains of a temple of Apollo.

The church has an entrance decorated with architectural sculpture executed at the beginning of the 17th century, though later restoration works altered the earlier fabric of the church. On either side of the entrance are two Roman-era inscriptions. The interior has three aisles, later modified in the 17th century. The second pillar holds a wooden pulpit richly ornamented with decorative elements and small statues; its central panel includes a relief of the martyrdom of Saint Lawrence, a 17th-century work. The tribune of the high altar is compared in form to that of St. Peter's Basilica in Rome.

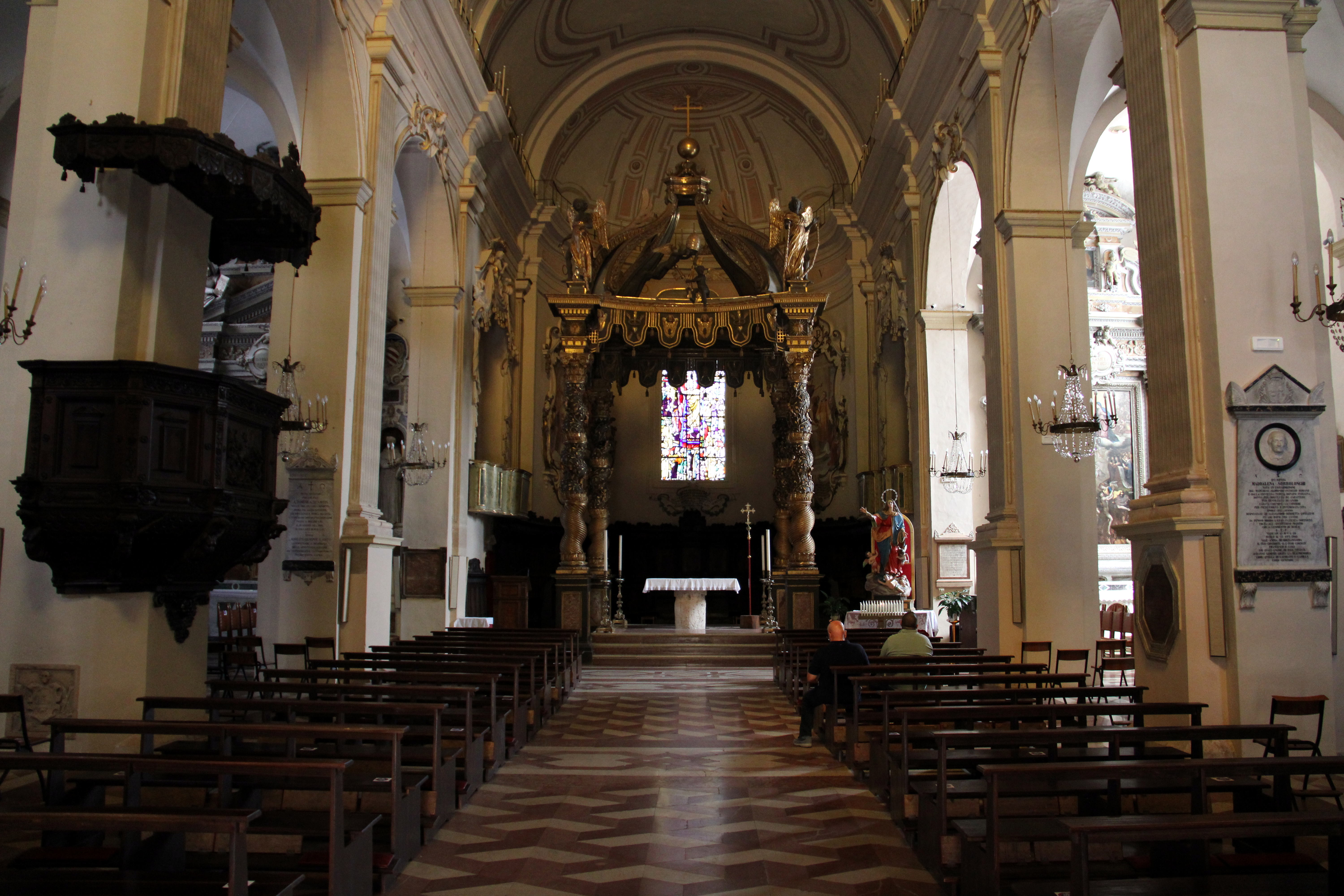
Interior of San Lorenzo, showing the nave and the raised baldachin on spiral columns

The apse contains the choir arranged in two tiers, with carved woodwork and marquetry. The upper tier has 25 stalls and the lower 20, and one stall bears the date 1533. On the altar at the head of the right aisle is a panel representing the glorification of the souls in Purgatory, signed Francesco da Castello and dated 1510. In the Chapel of the Sacrament there are six oil paintings illustrating episodes from the life of Saint Lawrence, attributed to the Zuccari, while the altar contains a monumental marble tabernacle with statues and columns made in 1587.

In the sacristy of the first chapel a silver chapter cross with chased and enamelled work is attributed to Paolo di Giovanni of Perugia, and there is also a 15th-century wooden sculpture of the Virgin with Jesus. On the right wall a small oil panel shows Mary, Jesus and John the Baptist, from a Bolognese school. The baptismal font dates to the 17th century, while behind it is a finely carved tabernacle for the holy oil attributed to Rocco da Vicenza.

The main sacristy has cupboards with carving and marquetry dated 1524. An oil painting of the Nativity of Mary recalls the manner of Bassano. The cupboards and a seat decorated with inlaid figures of Noah, Moses and Zechariah are associated with designs by Pinturicchio.

=== Santa Maria Maggiore ===
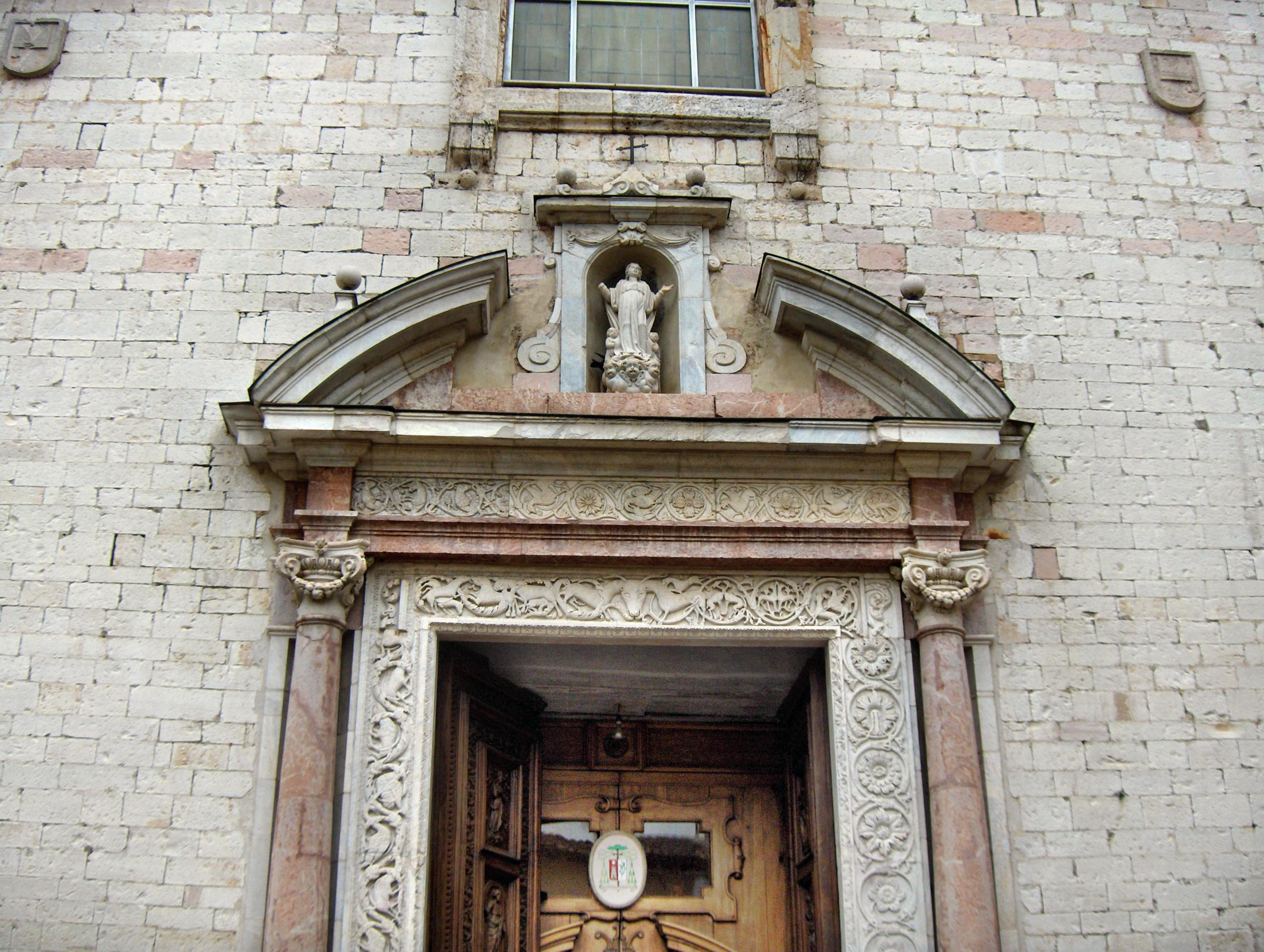
Entrance of Santa Maria Maggiore articulated by marble jambs with relief foliage

Santa Maria Maggiore, founded in the 11th–12th centuries, has a façade dating to 1644, created during an enlargement of the building. The portal preserves an architrave and marble jambs with a frieze and acanthus scrolls, associated with stonecutters active between the 12th and 13th centuries in the Foligno–Bevagna area and in part attributed to workshops linked with Spoleto. The church is built on a Latin-cross plan with a nave roofed by vaulting, and in the second half of the 17th century it was provided with seven altars and rich stucco decoration, with paintings and furnishings attributed to the same century.

Among notable fittings is an altar in marble of Gaius Titienus Flaccus, present in the church since the 15th century and now used as a holy-water stoup.

On the entrance wall to the left is a baptismal font made in 1510 by Antonio di Gasperino di valle di Lugano.

The left side of the church includes a Renaissance pulpit in sandstone by Simone da Campione (1545). The high altar is covered by a stone ciborium or tribune by Rocco di Tommaso da Vicenza (1515), and the apse area incorporates terracotta prophet heads by Giandomenico da Carrara (1562). Flanking the apse are two works by Perugino, both dated 1521: a Pietà with Saint John the Evangelist and Mary Magdalene, and a Madonna and Child with Saint Catherine of Alexandria and Saint Blaise.

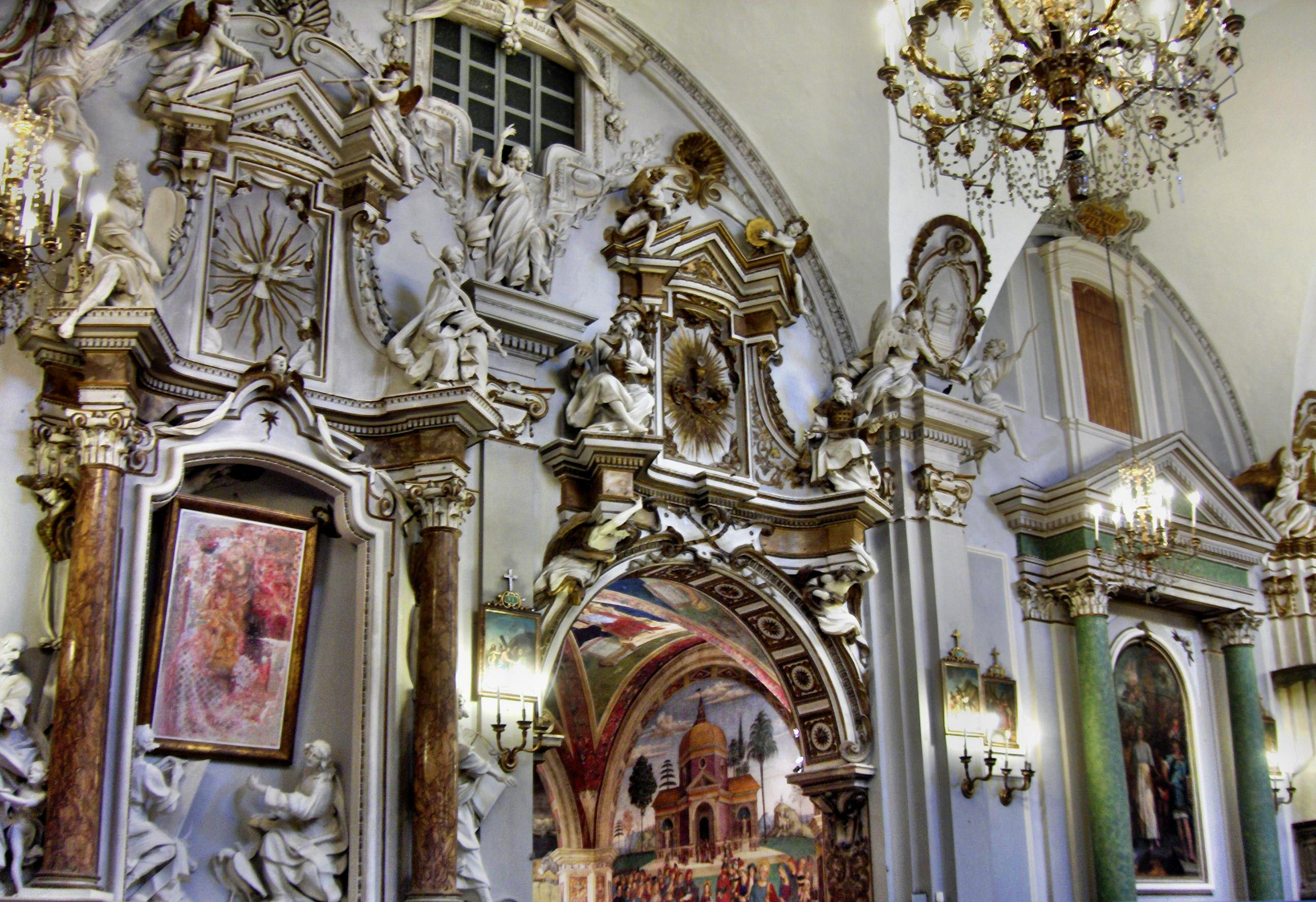
Baroque interior decoration in Santa Maria Maggiore

The maiolica tiles visible in the pavement of the tribune are attributed to the Friar of Deruta and were installed after later restorations, having been recognized as originally made for the pavement of Pinturicchio's painted chapel. In the apse there are traces of Giottesque paintings covered by plaster. The choir's carving and marquetry, much damaged and altered, date to 1512 and 1520.

On the last altar there are two small tempera panels from a 15th-century Umbrian school representing the Nativity of Christ and the Circumcision, and in front of them stands a Roman funerary cippus. On the entrance wall to the right is half of a baptismal font, cut during the restorations.

In the sacristy there are two benches with marquetry made in 1500 by Pollione di Gaspare of Foligno, eleven oil paintings depicting ten apostles and the Redeemer, and two tempera panels from a 15th-century Umbrian-school triptych. In the sacristy chapel an affresco of the Virgin with Jesus blessing is regarded as by Lo Spagna. Various metal objects are kept there, chased and enamelled, including a chapter cross of sheet silver signed by Paolo Vanni of Perugia, made in 1398, when Francesco Mili da Spello was prior of the church. In the bell tower the smaller bell bears the date 1209.

=== Baglioni Chapel ===
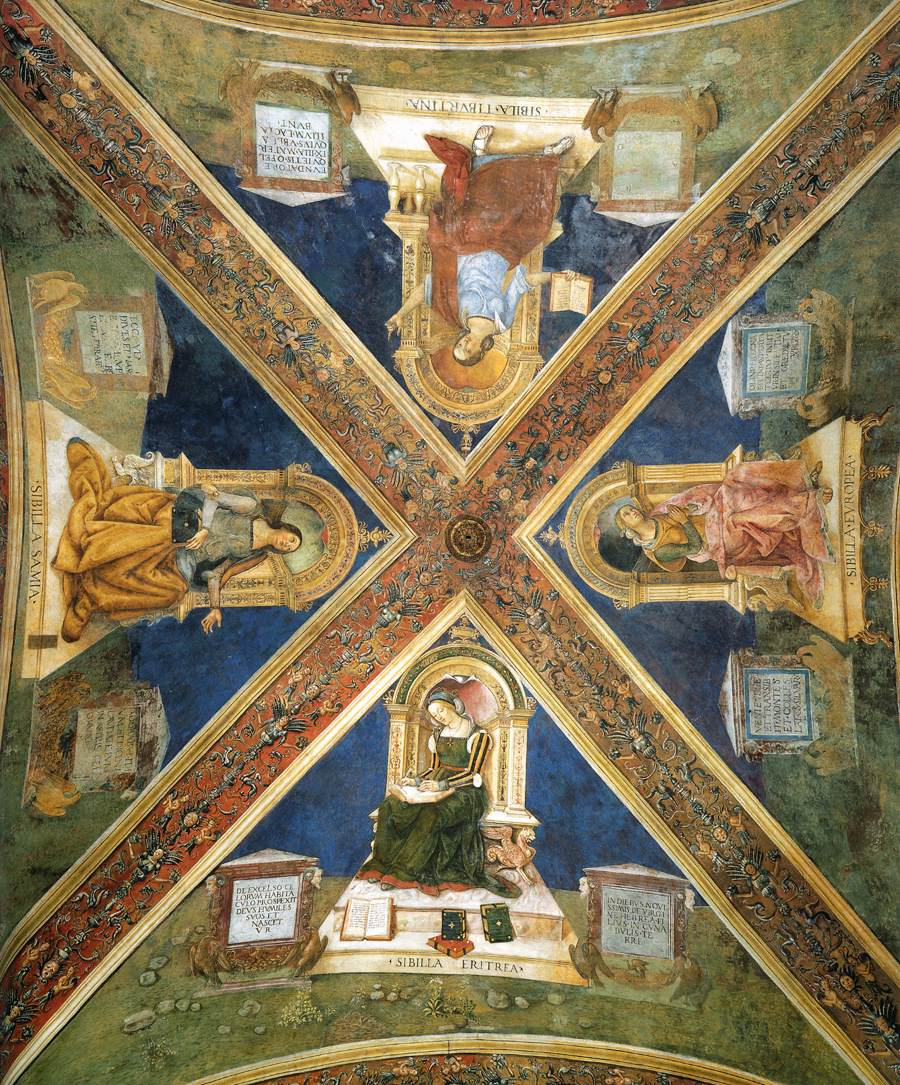
Pinturicchio's Four Enthroned Sibyls

The Baglioni Chapel opens along the left wall of Santa Maria Maggiore and was commissioned in 1500 by Troilo Baglioni from Pinturicchio. The chapel is fully frescoed by the artist, including sibyls seated on thrones on the vault—Tiburtine, Erythraean, European and Samian.

On the left wall is the Annunciation, which includes Pintoricchio's signed self-portrait; on the back wall are the Adoration of the Shepherds and the arrival of the Magi; on the right wall is the Disputation in the Temple. The chapel floor is decorated with Deruta maiolica tiles dated 1566. These paintings are counted among the master's major works.

=== Sant'Andrea ===
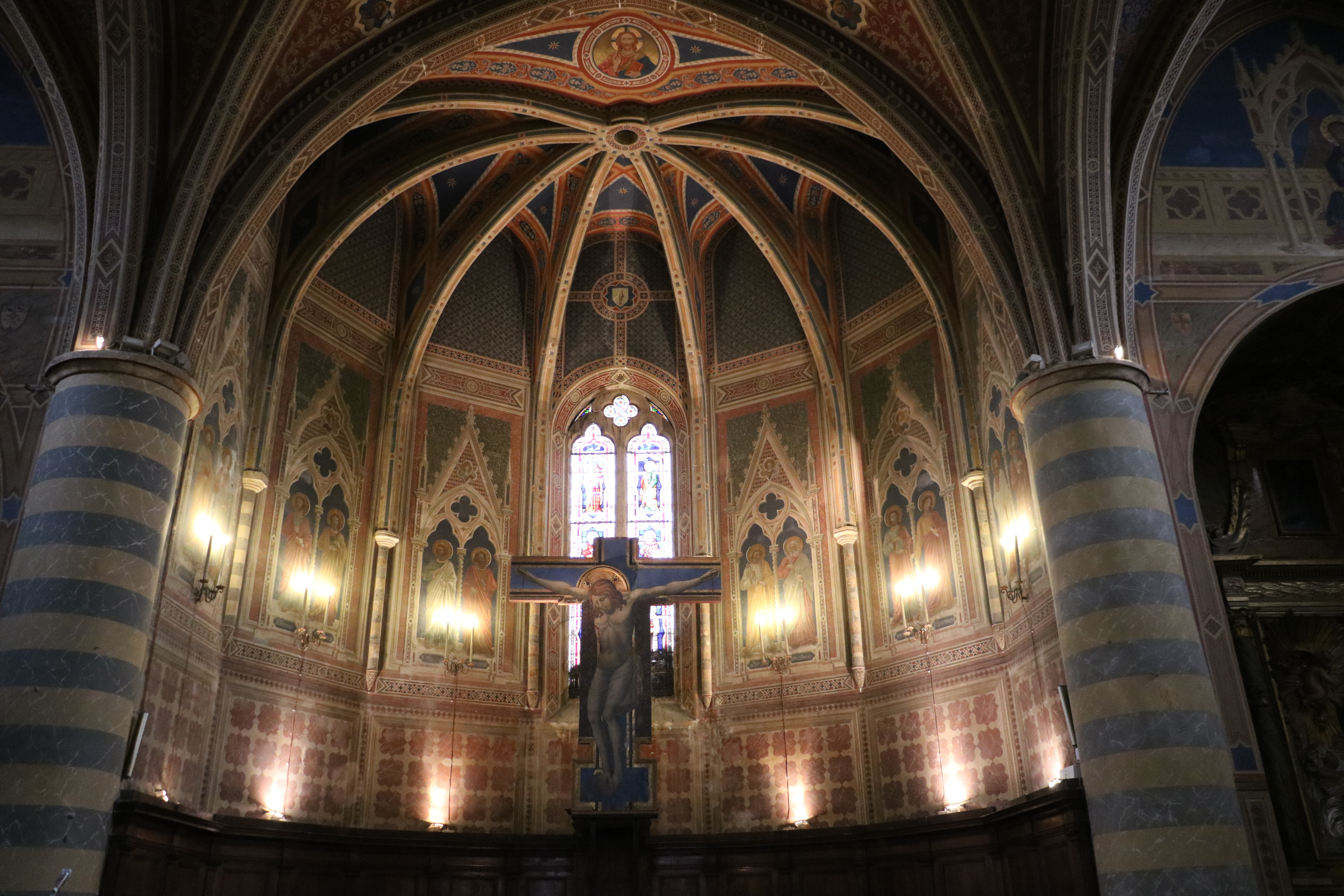
Church of Sant'Andrea

The church of Sant'Andrea stands a short distance from Santa Maria Maggiore. In 1253 the Blessed Andrea Caccioli established one of the early communities of Friars Minor there. The façade preserves a Romanesque portal, while the original rose window was removed to make way for a 16th-century window. The plan is a Latin cross with a single nave.

Inside, the church preserves a large panel painting by Pintoricchio, commissioned by Gentile Baglioni, showing the Madonna and Child among saints (1508). The painting is counted among Pinturicchio’s masterpieces. Behind the 14th-century high altar is a painted crucifix by an unknown local master influenced by Giotto, dated to the 14th century.

The church has, to the left of the entrance, a small stone tabernacle carved in the 16th century. The apse was once covered with Umbrian-school frescoes, later whitewashed.

=== San Claudio ===
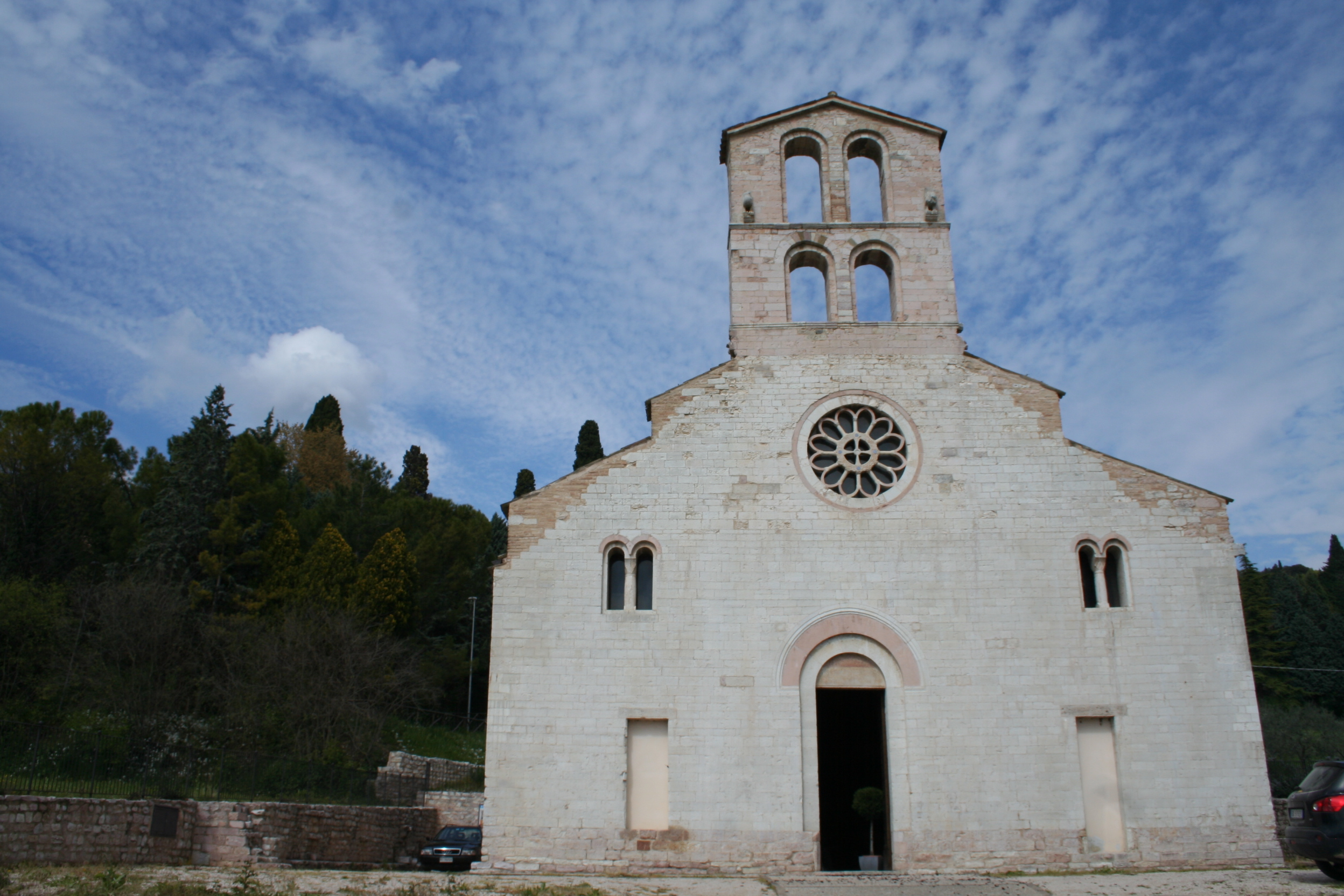
San Claudio, showing a gabled façade with a vertically stacked belfry articulated by twin arches

San Claudio lies along the road towards Villa Fidelia. The Romanesque building of the 12th century stands on the remains of a Roman thermal structure and was once among the possessions of the abbey of San Silvestro at Collepino; in the 14th century its administration passed to the municipality of Spello. Between the 14th and 15th centuries it was a destination for pilgrimages, and fairs took place in the space in front of the façade, a circumstance that led to the construction of loggias against the exterior walls, later destroyed.

The limestone façade includes a bell-gable reconstructed in the 16th century with two superimposed bifora openings; the central rose window, damaged by the earthquake of 1832, was reassembled in 1883. Three portals once gave access to three naves divided internally by piers on the left and columns on the right, though the side portals are closed. The original timber roof was replaced in the 14th century by three masonry arches which, progressively lowering, create the impression of greater depth. The altar is formed from a pillar and the lid of a Roman sarcophagus.

The semicircular apse and central nave preserve 15th-century frescoes of Umbrian school; in 1393 the presbytery zone was painted by Cola Petruccioli of Orvieto, with figures including Saint Andrew the Apostle, a Madonna and Child, the Archangel Gabriel, Saint Rufinus and Saint Lawrence. In the nave, a fresco attributed to Giovanni di Corraduccio depicts the Madonna and Child with Saint Anthony Abbot and Saint James.

=== Church and Convent of Santa Maria di Vallegloria ===
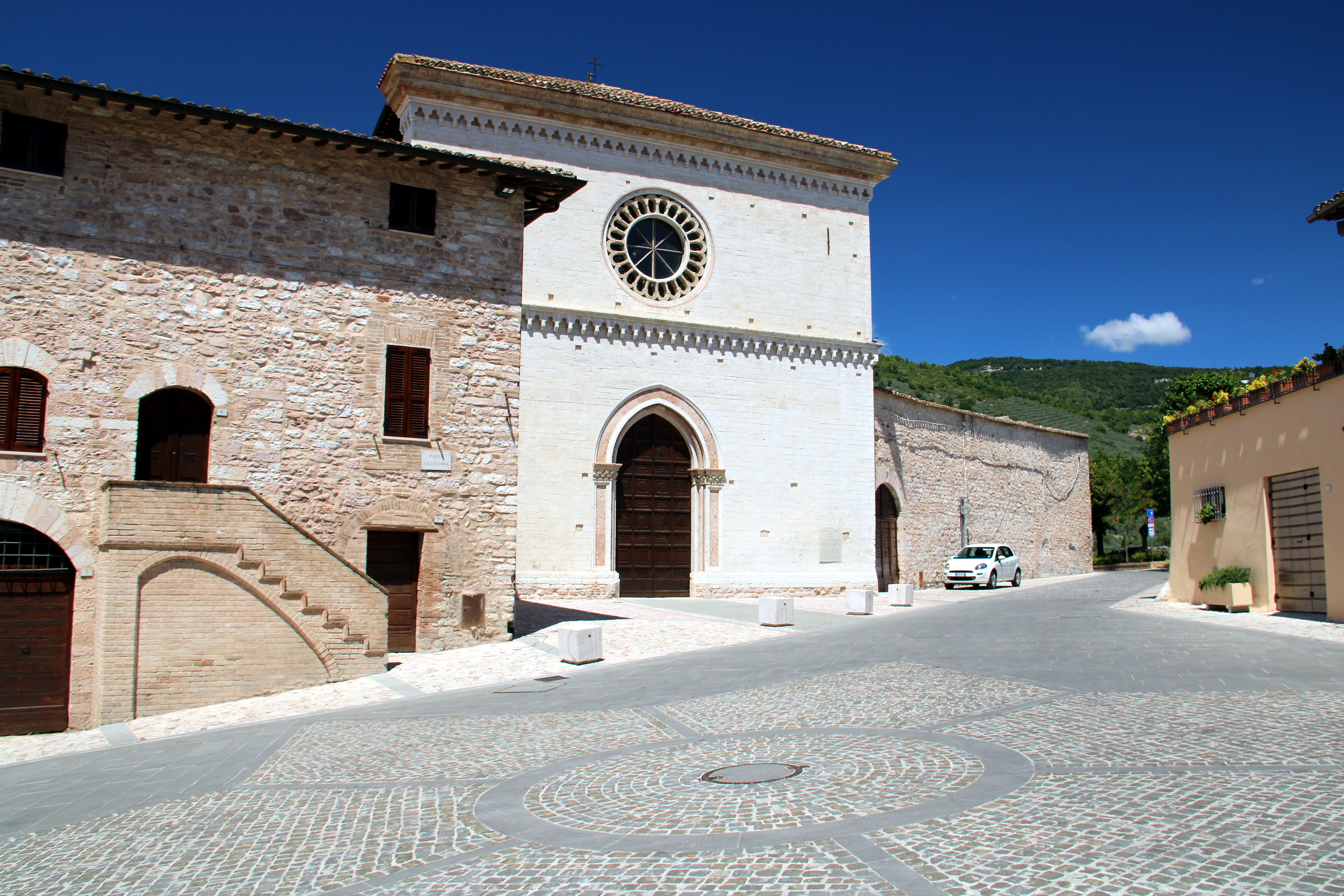
Santa Maria di Vallegloria

The Church and Convent of Santa Maria di Vallegloria has a façade built in limestone and divided by a band supported by small arches. The entrance is a Gothic arch with recessed moldings and small columns topped by a cordon. Above it is a circular window with a decoration of small columns, though the rose is missing. Inside, a panel of the Annunciation is signed and dated 1590.

In the convent, the altar of the monastic choir has a tempera panel of the Virgin with various saints, a work by Niccolò Alunno. In the oratory an affresco of the Virgin with various devotees, recalling the manner of Pinturicchio, bears the date 1520.

=== Church and Convent of San Girolamo ===
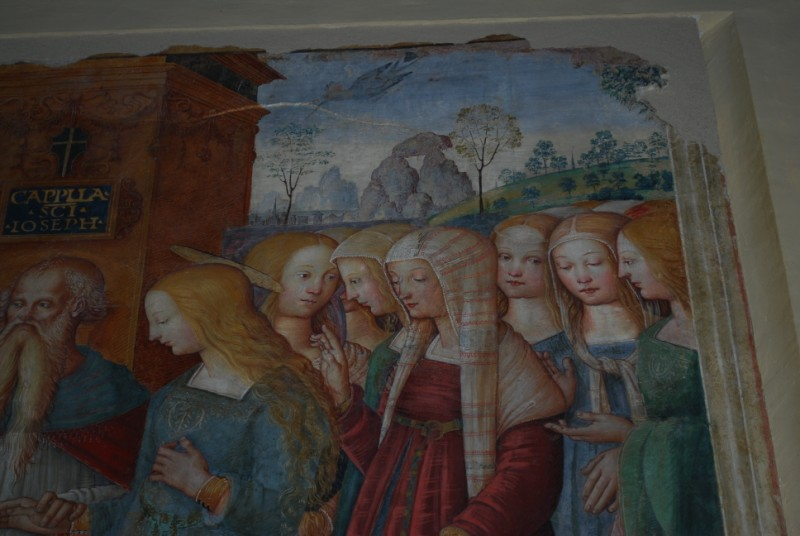
Sposalizio della Vergine in the church of San Girolamo

The church and convent of San Girolamo stand just outside Spello's walls on the road to Collepino. The complex was built from 1472 with funding from Braccio Baglioni, lord of Spello, and hosted a community of Friars Minor Observant until the early 20th century. Since 1965 the convent has housed the community of the Little Brothers of Jesus.

A portico precedes the main entrance. Inside are works including a carved and painted wooden crucifix from the late 15th century, a fresco of the Marriage of the Virgin by an unknown painter influenced by Pintoricchio, and a 16th-century inlaid wooden choir.

The Church and Convent has, in front of the church, a rectangular portico with columns and Ionic capitals, a Renaissance construction. An affresco of Job belongs to the school of Pinturicchio, while a Saint Francis is a work of a Foligno school. On the wall of the last portico is a large Epiphany composition associated with Fiorenzo di Lorenzo. Inside the church there are two reliquaries, a ciborium and a crucifix, wooden sculptures from the 16th century. Toward the choir is an affresco of the Marriage of the Virgin attributed to Fiorenzo di Lorenzo. In the adjoining cloister an affresco from the school of Pinturicchio depicts Saint Sebastian, Saint Roch and the Virgin enthroned with Jesus.

=== Other religious buildings ===
The Church of the Santissima Annunziata preserves an oil painting of the Annunciation. An inscription states that it was made from the admired image of the Annunciation in Florence, and records the name Alessandro Allori, with the date 1583.

The Church of San Bernardino has, on its façade, a 15th-century fresco of Saint Bernardino. The door jambs retain refined 15th-century carving. Inside, on the wall of the altar, are several frescoes depicting Saint Jerome; Mary with Jesus enthroned; Saint Bernardino; Saint Francis; and Saint Anne. They are associated with a pupil of Pinturicchio and bear the date 1503, though they underwent poor restorations in 1630.

The Church of Santa Maria Maddalena has, on the left altar, a panel of the Nativity of John the Baptist dated 1575. The painting of the Magdalene on the high altar is a 16th-century work.

The Church of the Ospedale preserves, in its sacristy, important sacred furnishings, including a chased copper cross dated 1376 and another cross earlier than that.

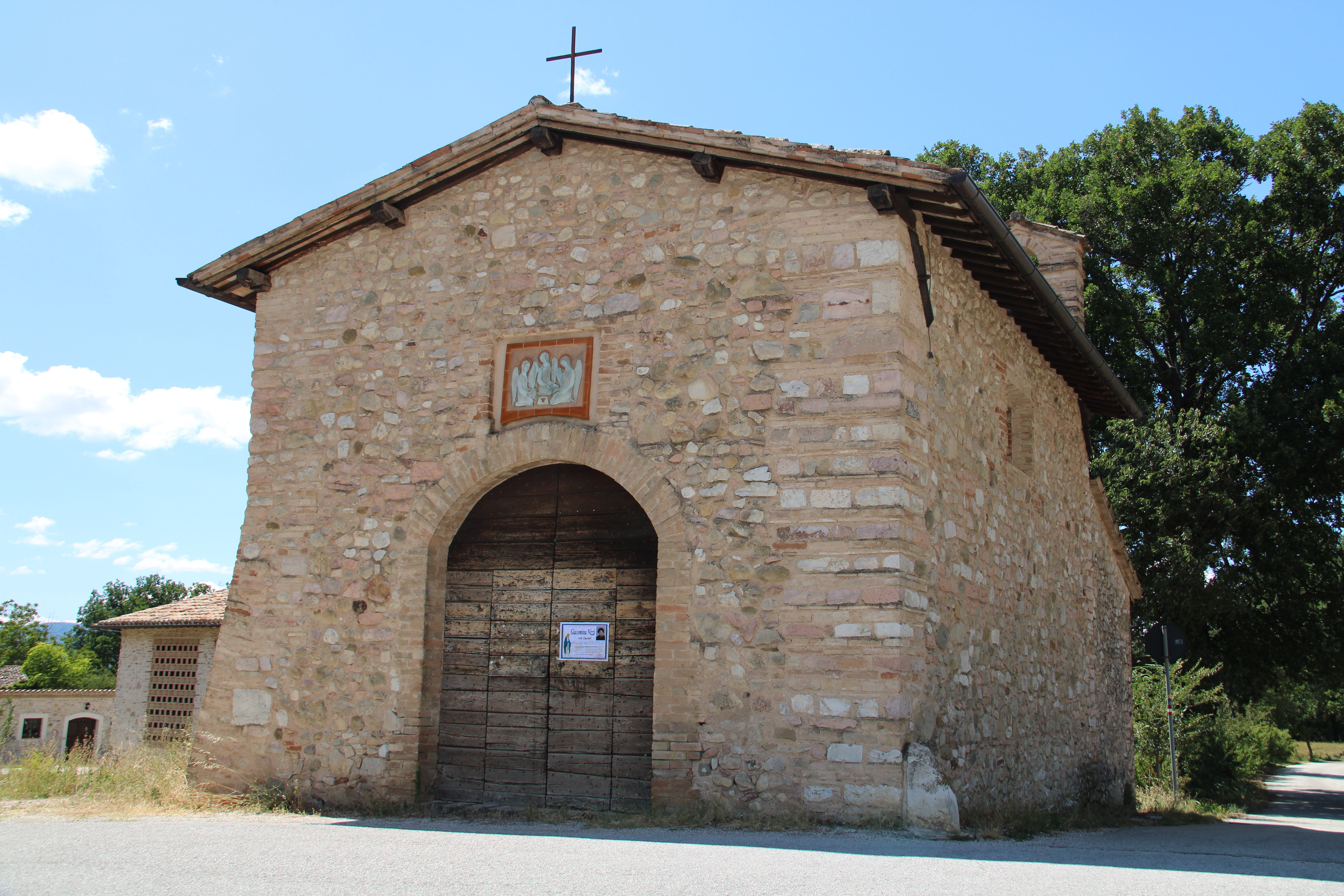
Church of Santissima Trinità, marked by its irregular stone façade with alternating courses of pale and pinkish blocks

The Church of the Santissima Trinità, outside Porta Prato, was once entirely decorated with Giottesque-school frescoes, some of which are covered by plaster. Among the works recalled are a Dormition of the Virgin and a Crucifix with Mary and John.

The Church of Santa Maria della Rotonda has the form of a Greek cross, with an entrance of elegant architecture bearing the date 1530. On the first altar to the left there is an affresco by Mezzastri. A depiction of Saint Roch on the second pillar of the dome is attributed to the Zuccari.

The Church of Santa Maria del Mausoleo takes its name from the fact that the sanctuary behind the high altar was built within the remains of a chamber belonging to a monumental Roman tomb.

The Church of the Cappuccini stands on the summit of a hill overlooking the valley and olive groves. On the south side, where the apse of the present church is, the façade of an older church remains, with a richly ornamented 12th-century circular window. In the sacristy there is an oil painting of Mary with Saint Francis and Saint Onophrius, attributed to Durante dal Borgo.

Tega Chapel, from the 14th century, features 15th-century Umbrian school frescoes, including a Crucifixion attributed to Nicolò Alunno.

Beyond the town proper, the comune's chief monuments are the church of San Silvestro at Collepino, and the church of the Madonna della Spella with late-medieval votive frescoes and graffiti.

== Culture ==
=== Palazzo Comunale ===
The Palazzo Comunale formerly served as the seat of the municipality of Spello. The building is the result of an enlargement of an earlier 13th-century municipal palace built of white and pink limestone. The original building was constructed in 1270 by Maestro Prode. Major transformations to both the building and the square in front were carried out in 1567–1575, after the end of Baglioni rule, under the direction of the Lombard master Battaglia di Pietro. As part of these works, the ramped staircase leading to the earlier palace was demolished and replaced by a fountain that still survives, bearing reliefs and the coat of arms of Pope Julius III.

In the 17th century Abbot Ferdinando Passerini transformed part of the palace atrium into a kind of lapidarium, which remains in place and collects Roman and medieval inscriptions found in the municipal territory. From the loggia one enters the Sala delle Volte, also known as the “Sala della Cripta”, which now hosts the Museo dell'Infiorata.

In the mayor's office a Giottesque-school diptych is kept. In a wall of the notarial archive an Umbrian-school fresco is painted. Inscriptions in honor of the emperor Gordian are also recorded.

=== Palazzo Baglioni ===
Palazzo Baglioni stands between the Palazzo Comunale and the church of Sant'Andrea. It was commissioned by Adriano Baglioni, lord of Spello, and built in 1561 to a design by Battaglia di Pietro and Filippo di Giacomo. The structure incorporates part of the Rocca Albornoziana (1358), itself built over the former seat of the Oratory of the Raccomandati of Santa Maria della Misericordia.

The Baglioni family lived in the palace only briefly; in 1583 it was occupied by the apostolic governor until 1860. After severe damage in the earthquake of 1832, it was restored in the 1970s to house a state middle school. Much of the original Baglioni residence has been lost, though along Via del Seminario Vecchio there are visible construction elements that reflect the building’s different phases. The interior was heavily altered for school use, but on the first floor, in the Sala del Governatore, the ceiling decoration in painted panels and a frieze with female figures and views of the Umbrian Valley, dated to the 16th century, remains.

=== Villa Fidelia ===
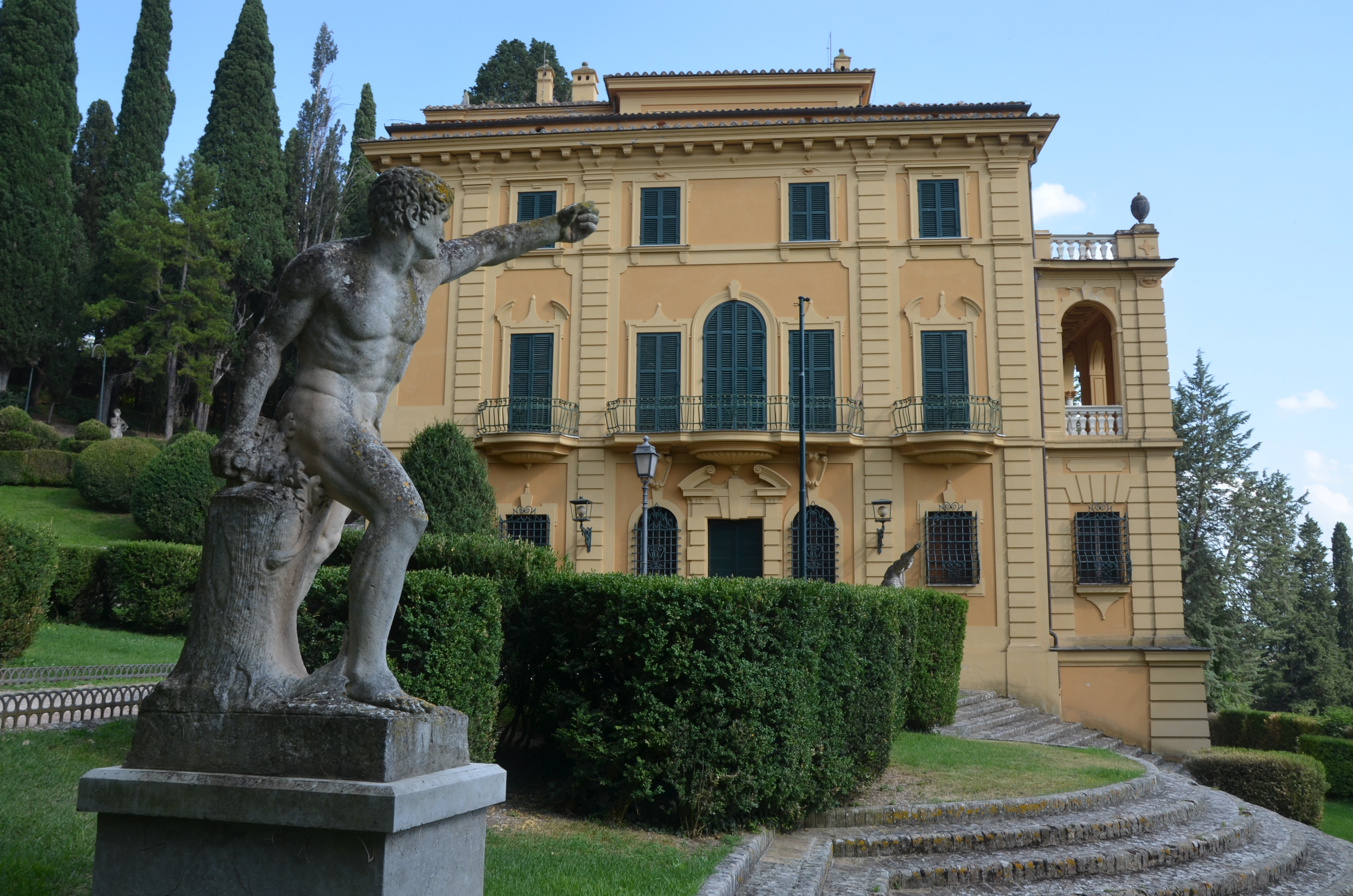
Villa Fidelia

Villa Fidelia, also known as Villa Costanzi, was built in the 16th century by the Urbani family on the remains of a sanctuary belonging to a classical sacred complex dated to the 4th century, and in the 18th century it passed to Teresa Pamphili Grillo, who transformed it completely. The plan retains the disposition of earlier Roman structures, although the current Villa Fidelia complex no longer includes the southernmost portion, which belongs to the Missionary Sisters of Egypt.

The main building has a rectangular plan and rises over five levels, with three above ground due to the slope. The façades are richly decorated in Baroque and Neoclassical taste, articulated with pilasters, rusticated elements, horizontal bands, and windows with curved moldings and broken pediments. A prominent staircase and a portal with a broken pediment define the center of the main façade. On the valley side a later wing includes a loggia opening to the view, marked by a higher central arch crowned with a pediment and a projecting small balcony. The secondary façade is tripartite, raised at the center, with two symmetrical lateral entrances.

The villa's most notable feature is its external layout, comprising a terraced Baroque garden, a galoppatoio, an Italian garden, and a park. The garden is organized in ascending terraces connected by stairways and lined with cypress avenues, with an exedra fountain and, at the upper end, the so-called esedra dell'orologio leading into the park. The galoppatoio is formed by a circular arrangement of holm oaks.

=== Other secular buildings ===
Other points of interest include:

- Palazzo dei Canonici - Priory annexed to the church of Santa Maria Maggiore, it now houses the Town's Art Gallery (Pinacoteca Civica). Among the artists featured are the Maestro dell'Assunta di Amelia, Cola Petruccioli, Zaccaria di Filippo Mazzola (brother of Parmigianino), Andrea d'Assisi also called Ingegno, and a Madonna and Child by Pinturicchio.
- Palazzo Cruciali, built in the early 17th century.

=== Events ===
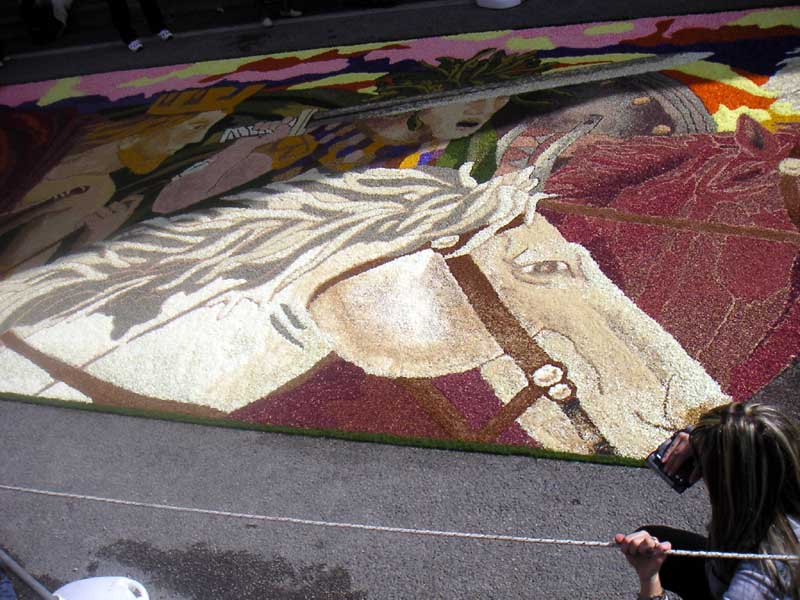
The Infiorata in 2004

The town's visual identity is closely linked to its floral displays, culminating in the Infiorata on Corpus Domini, when streets are covered with elaborate flower-petal compositions depicting sacred subjects.

== Notable people ==
Spello is credited as the birthplace of Francesco Mauri, poet, crowned by Cosimo I for the poem La Francisciade on Saint Francis; Ercole Cacciaguerra, a captain who fought under Bohemond of Apulia; Onorato Olorini, who fought at the Battle of Lepanto; Francesco Berretta, a physician; Giuseppe Paolucci, among the founders of the Arcadia; Ventura Piaggia and Niccolò Piaggia, jurists; and Vitale Rosi, a pedagogue.

A dwelling in the town was known as the House of Propertius, and in 1723 a cinerary urn was found beneath it, believed to be that of the poet; Spello is noted as one of the cities that claim to have been his birthplace.

== Twin towns ==
- Alfonsine, Italy, since 1974

Since 2008 Spello has also a pact of friendship with Accadia, Italy.
