= San Lorenzo, Spello =

Church in Spello, Italy

Coordinates: 42°59′33″N 12°40′17″E

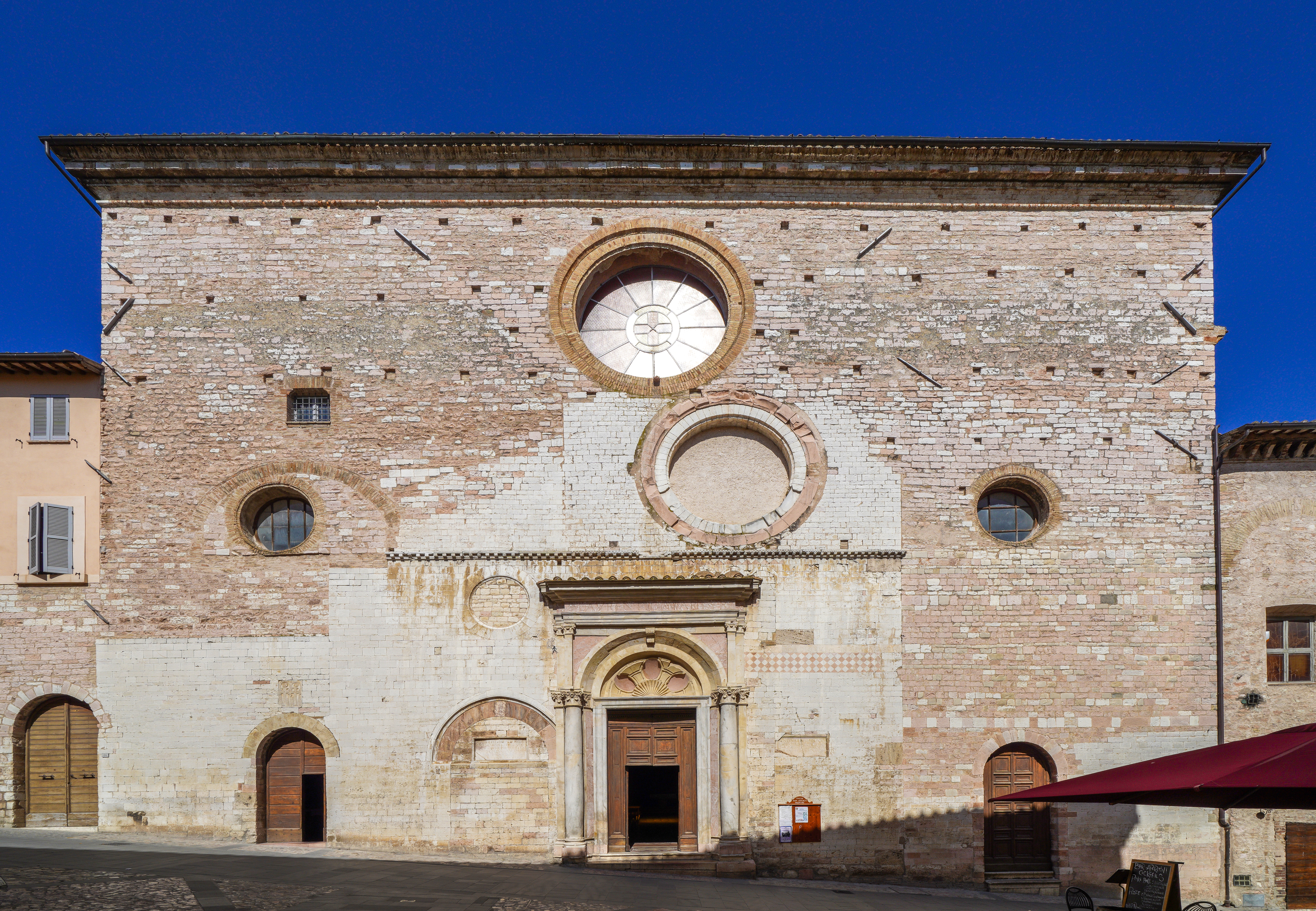
Spello in the province of Perugia in Umbria, Italy. Church San Lorenzo.

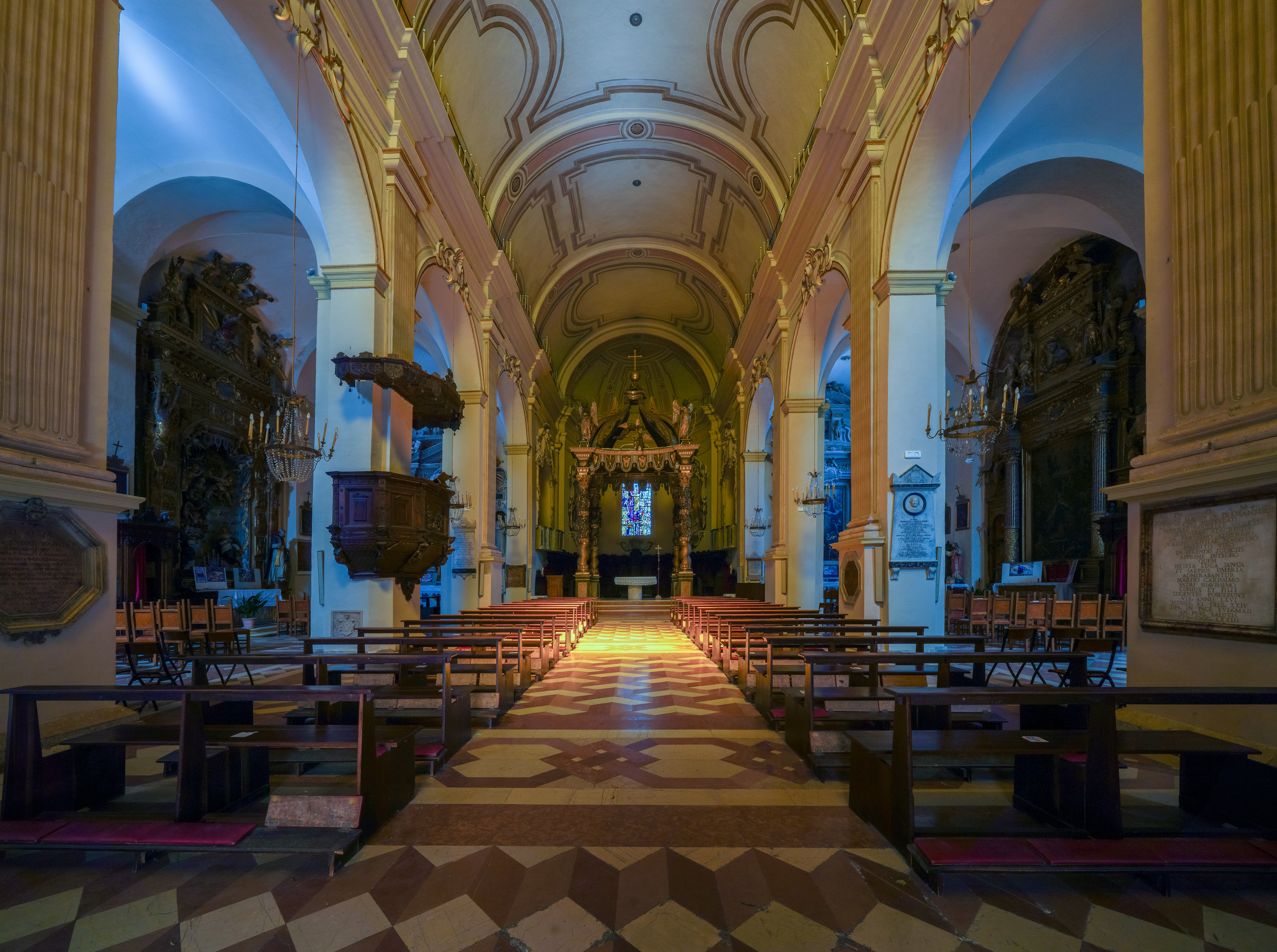
Interior

San Lorenzo is a 14th-century church located in Spello, in Perugia province Umbria, Italy.

== History ==
The church was erected at the site of earlier temples, after the repulse of the siege of Spello in 1120. It was damaged, rebuilt, and reconsecrated in 1228 by Pope Gregory IX. In 1438, San Bernardino of Siena preached there. It was visited by Popes in 1476, 1507 and 1534. A major refurbishment took place in 1564.
