= Sanctuary of Venus at Hispellum =

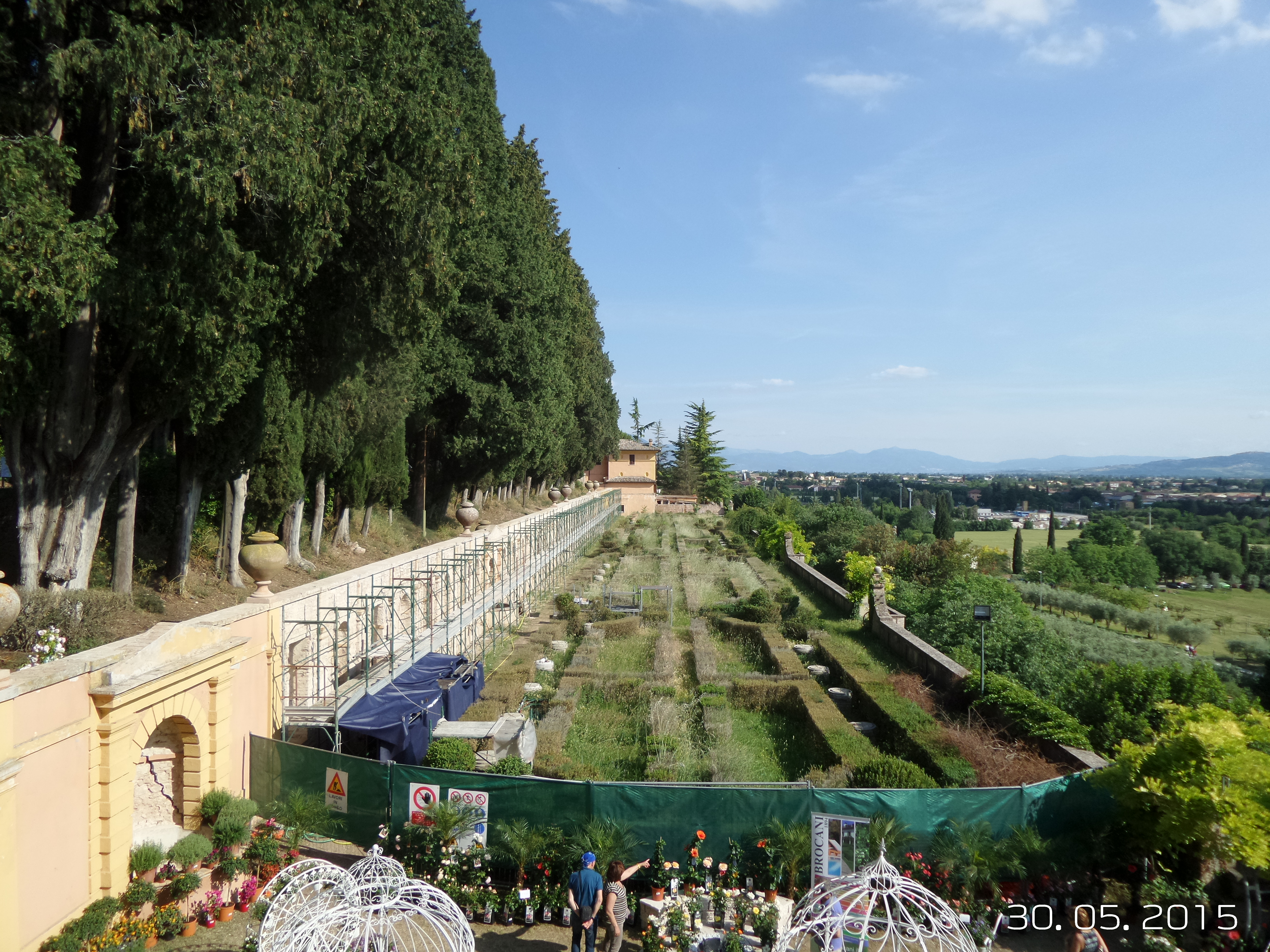
Terraces of Villa Fidelia

The ancient Sanctuary of Venus at Hispellum (modern Spello) was a grandiose theatre-temple-amphitheatre complex, today located partially in the grounds of the Villa Fidelia to the northwest of the Italian city. It was located outside the walls of the ancient city on a slope near the bottom of the Spello hill facing west as part of an impressive monumental layout.

== History ==
The ancient sanctuary to the goddess Venus (or her Umbrian equivalent) was an important sacred place for Umbrian tribes from the 3rd c. BC as shown by archaeology. The site was monumentalised, at least in the south-eastern part towards the city, in the Republican age (2nd-1st century BC). Under Augustus, monumentalisation was greatly enhanced with inclusion of the theatre, amphitheatre etc., on a Hellenistic sanctuary model, as at Tibur and Praenesta and other sites in Lazio.

Under Constantine the Great (r. 306–337) the city was important enough to be appointed the seat of the annual meetings of the Umbrian peoples, using the sanctuary for the theatrical and gladiatorial games, which had previously taken place only in the Etruscan city of Volsinii, according to the rescript of the emperor recorded on a marble tablet found at the centre of the sanctuary. The Umbrian and Tuscan peoples at this time were undefined as they had been Roman citizens for centuries but they clearly still had ancient traditions to celebrate.

== The Site ==
The special geographical position of the sanctuary appears particularly strategic within the Umbrian valley, at the branch of the Via Flaminia towards Perusia and in close relationship with the sanctuaries at Mevania, Vettona, Urvinum Hortense and Trebiae.

Geophysical surveys have allowed reconstruction of the sanctuary and its relationship to the theatre and other buildings. On the other side of the road to the terraces are the scanty remains of the theatre, as well as the amphitheatre.

From the republican period or later, 3 terraces were created on the hill slope, two of which are still visible with mighty walls in Roman concrete (opus caementicium) covered with opus vittatum supporting the lower terraces. The second terrace contains the present "Italian" garden and Villa Fidelia itself which overlaps the lower terrace. The lower wall has remains of a large central nymphaeum and a quadrangular niche. Of the upper wall only the internal part in opus caementicium remains.

=== Temple of Venus ===
At the southern end of the middle terrace the nunnery stands on the site of the original villa Urbani, where a large mosaic pavement was found during construction of the villa in the 1600s with parts of a statue of Venus. An excavation in the building's foundations there in 2011 revealed an older temple had been built on the highest terrace. In the 2nd half of the 1st century BC the temple was extended with a new cella on the middle terrace below and a bi-coloured mosaic and new statue. This remodelling went together with a reconsecration of the old cult site to a new one of the imperial Caesarian cult of Venus Genetrix, central to Augustus's religious ideology at that time and entry into the religious heart of Umbria. This remodelling was referred to in the inscription found in the 1600s commemorating the commissioning of a statue to Venus by the duumvirs Marcus Granius and Sextus Lollius following a decree of the decurions of Hispellum. The extension of the old temple involved the construction of new walls and a new pronaos overlooking the valley, dated to ca. 27 BC, after Augustus had restored Via Flaminia.

=== Second Temple ===
At the north end of the upper terrace some Roman remains suggest that here was a second temple on which was built the Villa Fidelia. This building is likely to be present due to the resulting symmetry of the whole sanctuary with the theatre and the terraces, and similarity with other sanctuaries.

=== Temple of the Flaviae gentis (the Flavian family) ===
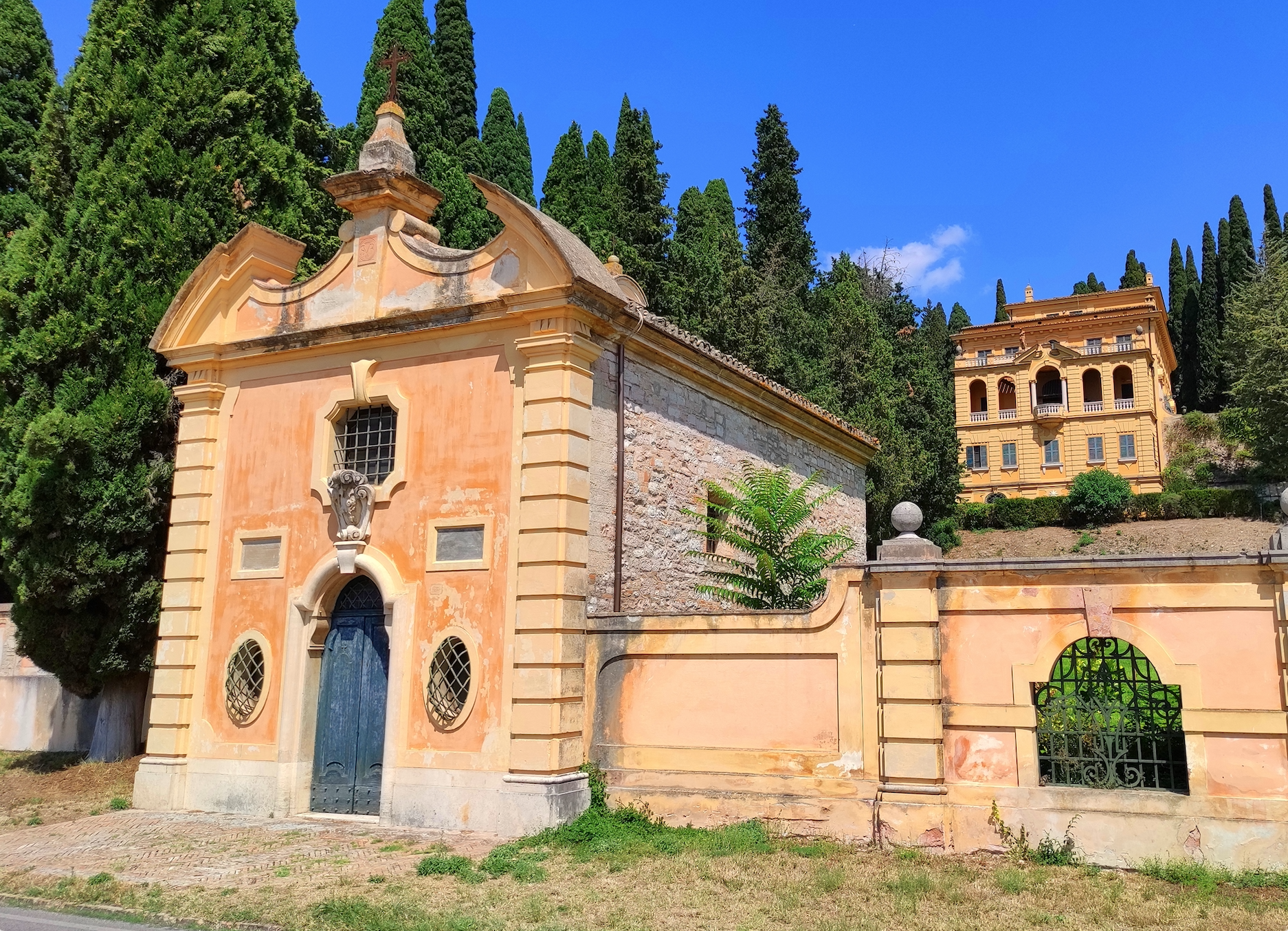
church of San Fedele

Remains in opus mixtum found below the small church of San Fedele near the Villa Fidelia seem to have belonged to this third temple dating from the 4th century AD. It was probably dedicated to Constantine's ancestors. It consisted of a long hall with an apse at the end, all used as the foundations of the church.

The temple was probably that referred to in the rescript of Constantine as a precondition to the partial transfer of the annual Umbrian festival that had previously been held at Volsinii. Excavations in 2023 revealed parts of the temple.

=== Theatre ===
The excavations in 1830 revealed that the theatre had a straight side of some 106 m built centralised and parallel to the terraces of the sanctuary.

It dates to the late 1st century BC when the sanctuary was monumentalised. It could hold 6000 spectators and was the largest theatre in Umbria, and among the largest in Italy. It was far too large for the colonists and a small city like Hispellum, and was clearly intended for wider Umbrian communities, supported by its location outside the walls of Hispellum. Therefore, the theatre and the sanctuary could have formed part of Augustus's programme to pacify the neighbours of Hispellum after the land appropriation and other wounds inflicted in the Perusine War of 41 BC.

=== Amphitheatre ===
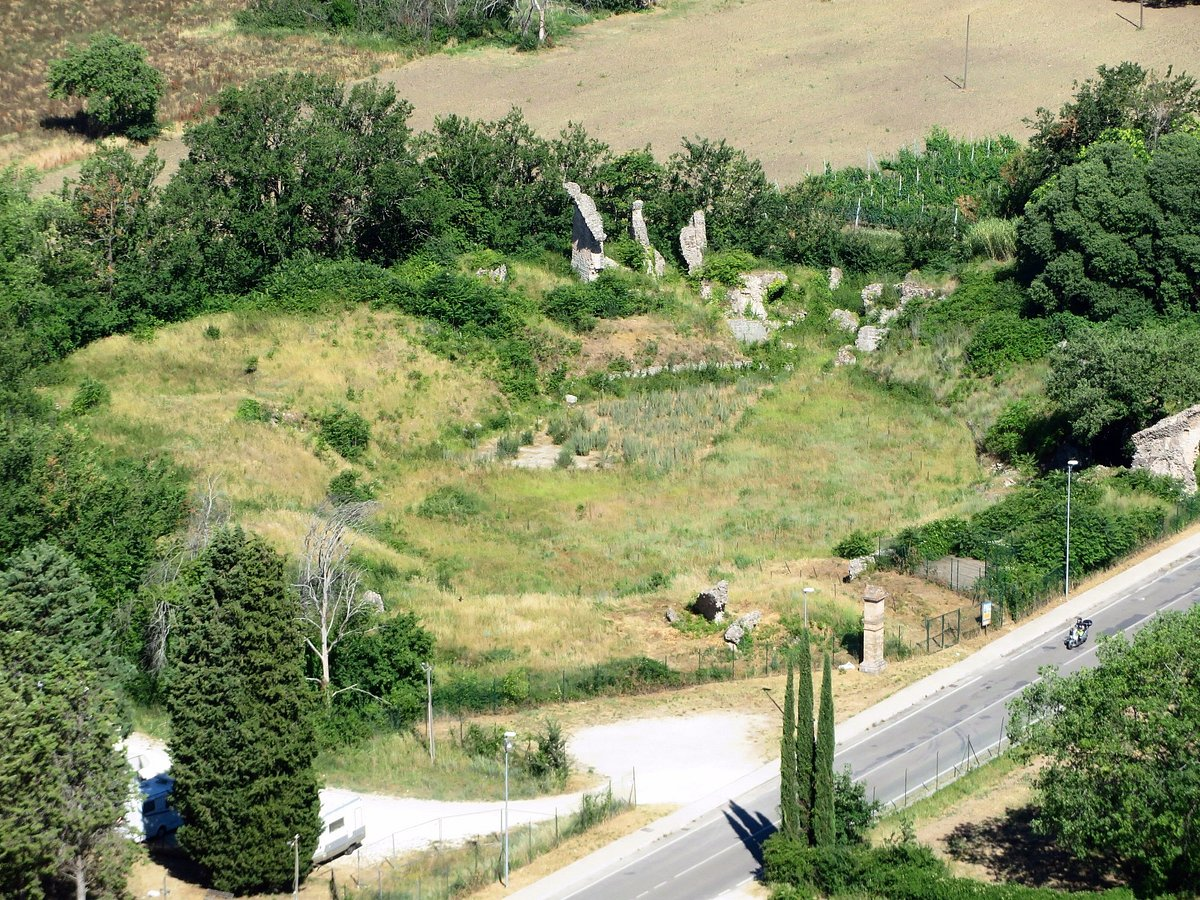
Amphitheatre

Like all Umbrian amphitheatres it was built up from the ground rather than on a hill to support seating. From inscriptions it seems to have been built in the Augustan period and as part of a single plan of the sanctuary, but the construction techniques suggest that it was built after the theatre.

It was originally of considerable size with a height of about 16 m and an elliptical plan of 59 x 35.5 m, and it could hold more than 7000 spectators.

Externally it was decorated with semicircular columns in alternating pink and white which remained in place on the western side. Some parts of the steps and some stretches of the original flooring are still visible, as well as walls in opus vittatum. Numerous inscriptions were found here during the excavations of 1957–1958.

=== Baths ===
Remains of thermal baths were found in excavations in 2001–3 beneath the nearby church of San Claudio, including geometric mosaic floors and heated rooms.
