= Collepino =

- Frazione
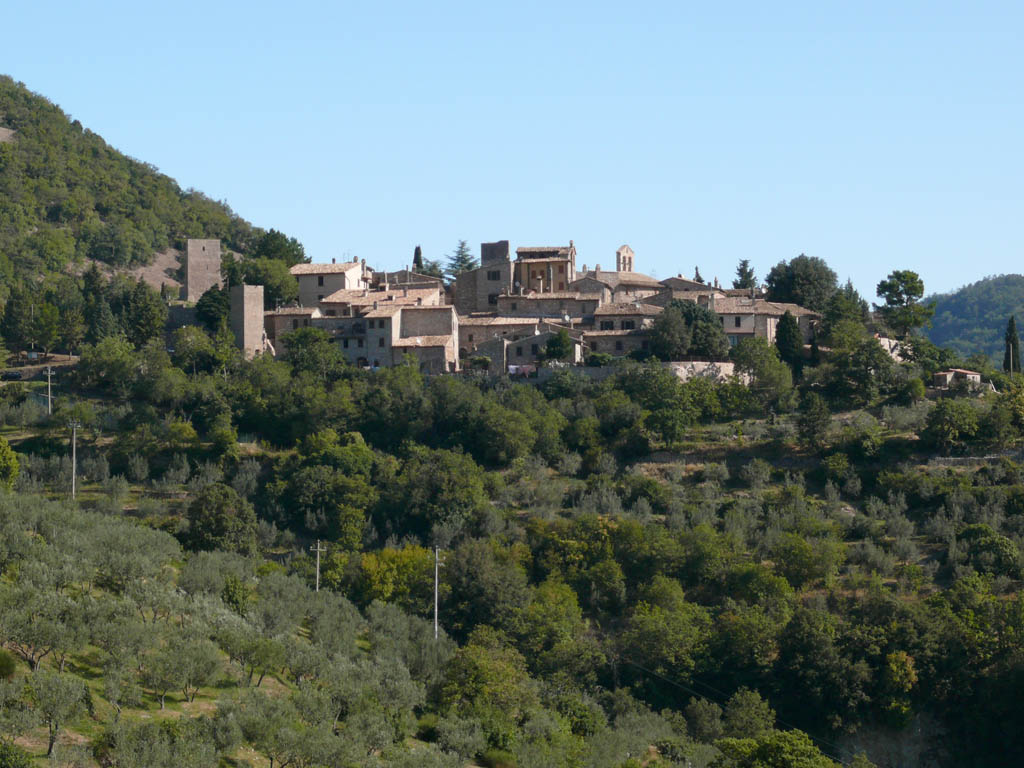
- Collepino

- Location of Collepino in Italy
- Coordinates: 43°01′N 12°42′E
- Country: Italy
- Region: Umbria
- Province: Perugia
- Comune: Spello
- Elevation: 600 m (2,000 ft)
- Time zone: UTC+1 (CET)
  - Summer (DST): UTC+2 (CEST)

Collepino is a village in Umbria, central Italy. It is a frazione of the comune of Spello.

== Geography ==
Collepino is situated on a hill 600m.a.s. at the flank of Monte Subasio on a panoramic road from Spello to Assisi

== History ==
Collepino can be traced back to the 13th century. The inhabitants were shepherds and woodworkers at the nearby Abbey S. Silvestro.

== Historic sites ==
- Castello di Collepino
- San Silvestro Abbey (founded in 1025 a.c.), in Romantic style
- Fonte di S. Silvestro near the abbey
- Chiesa della Madonna della Spella on the hilltop of Monte Subasio
