= Sant'Anna, Spello =

Oratory in Spello, Italy

Coordinates: 42°59′22″N 12°40′26″E

Sant’Anna is a 14th-century oratory located in Spello, province of Perugia, region of Umbria, Italy.

== History ==
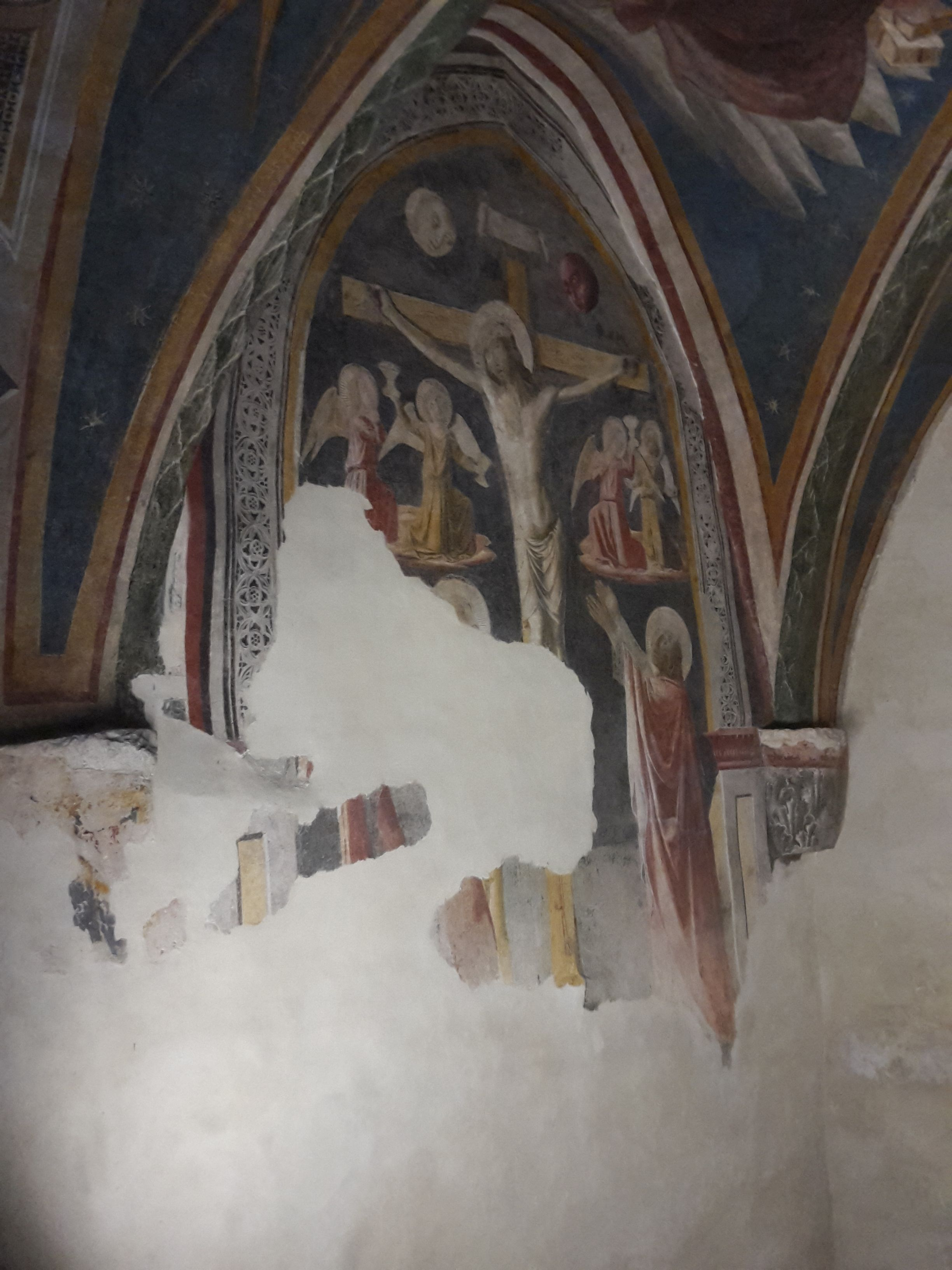
Fresco of Crucifixion

This chapel was originally the prayer hall or oratory of the medieval Flagellant confraternity dei disciplinati di Sant'Anna, who are known to have operated a hospital nearby since 1362. The hospital and confraternity appear to have been suppressed in 1571, and led the building to serve as a warehouse. In 1970, the frescoes underwent restoration, and the building is now also known as Capella Tega, due to the present owner.

The walls of the oratory were frescoed circa 1461 by Nicolò di Liberatore known as l'Alunno and a second artist, once designated as the Master of the Life of the Baptist (Todino) (Maestro delle storie del Battista-Todini), now suspected to be Pietro di Mazzaforte, son of Giovanni di Corraduccio.

== Interior artworks ==
- St Anne, Madonna and Child (right wall) attributed to Pietro di Mazzaforte:
- Crucifixion (1461, apse wall) attributed to l'Alunno
- Busts of the Apostles (left wall): Saints John, James Minor, Thomas by l'Alunno & St James Major, Bartholemew and Andrew by Mazzaforte.
- The Mystical Lamb by Mazzaforte.
- St Peter and Purgatory on left St Paul and Hell on right (counterfacade) attributed to Mazzaforte
- Evangelists (ceiling) attributed to l'Alunno
