= Villa dei Mosaici, Spello =

Coordinates: 42.98814°N 12.67417°E

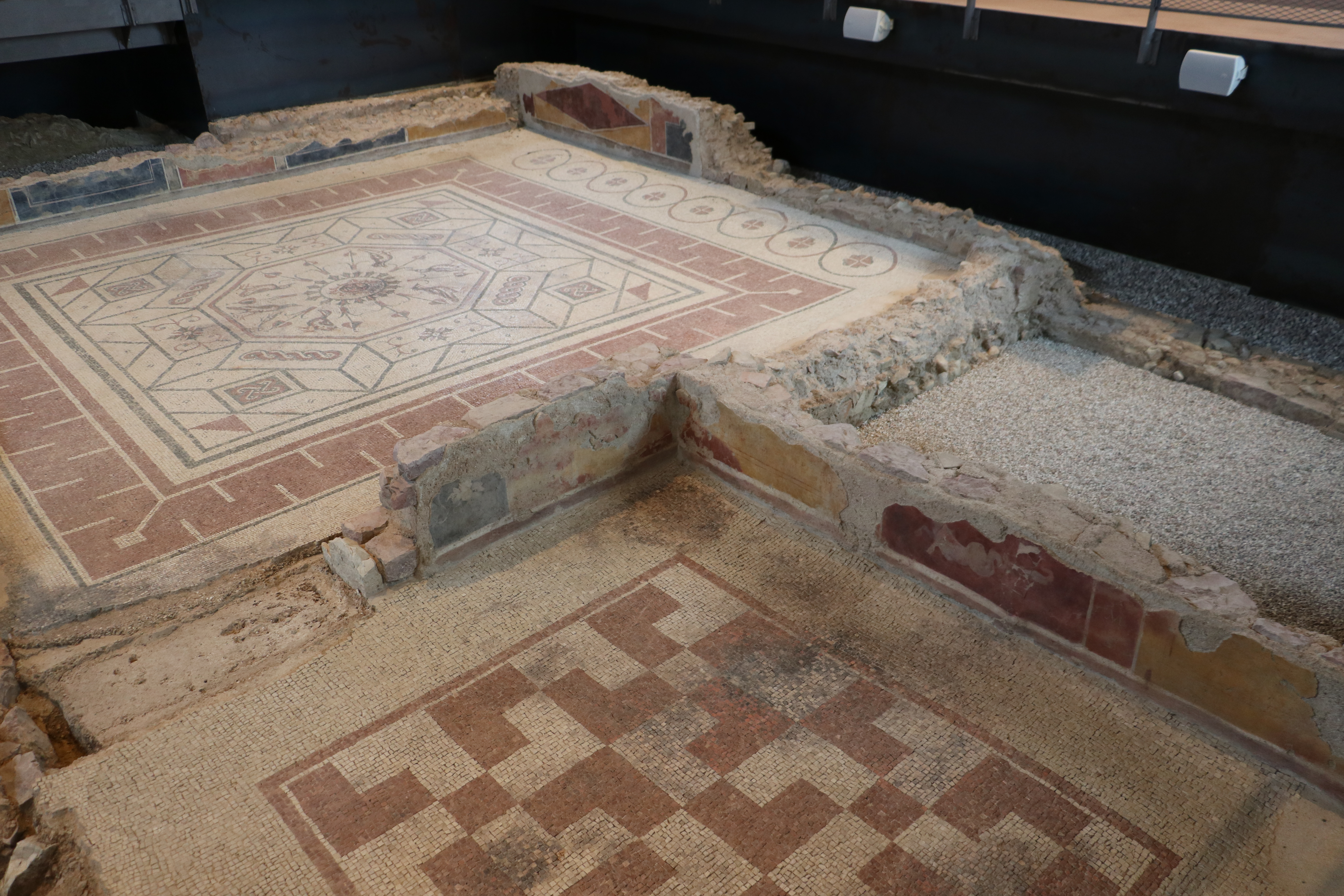
Geometric mosaic patterns and painted wall fragments of Villa dei Mosaici (early 4th century)

Villa dei Mosaici is a Roman villa from the early 4th century AD located just outside the town walls of Spello, Italy, known for its large rooms and rich mosaic floors.

== Discovery ==
The remains of the complex were found in July 2005 just outside the town walls. Excavations uncovered part of a large building, with seven rooms that likely formed the central part of a villa or a public building from the late Roman period. The size and plan suggest a well organized structure built for a high status owner.

Archaeologists identified several connected spaces with different functions. The known length of one long open area is about 24.5 by 5 meters. The layout shows a clear plan, with rooms arranged around this space. The building was in use in the early 4th century AD, as shown by the materials found during excavation.

== Mosaics ==
One room preserves almost all of its mosaic floor, made with white, pink, and black tiles in geometric patterns. A second room has a large multicolor mosaic floor and remains of painted wall plaster. The floor, about 140 square metres (1,500 sq ft), is divided into repeated oval panels with figures of animals and people.

Inside these panels are images of wild animals such as panthers, deer, boars, and ducks, along with imaginary creatures. At the center is a scene with two male figures shown in profile. One carries a jar on his shoulders and pours wine into a cup held by the other figure. The wine that spills from the cup is caught in a large bowl placed on the ground. Other figures are placed in a balanced way and hold plants or tools linked to farming, likely representing the four seasons.

Another room has a geometric floor made with larger tiles, while a fourth room shows a pattern of octagons with birds at the center. These birds are carefully made, and fragments of decorative plaster in red and blue were also found there. A fifth room preserves only a small part of a mosaic border.

A sixth room, located west of the large hall, has a decoration of wavy white bands with diamond shapes. The last room contains a mosaic with the sun at the center, surrounded by an eight sided frame with interlaced bands and floral motifs. Along one edge runs a pattern of interwoven bands.

== Interpretation ==
The quality of the mosaics, especially in the largest room, shows skilled work and careful use of color. The builders were likely experienced craftsmen, possibly brought in from a major center to meet the demands of a wealthy owner. The size of the complex, the richness of the decoration, and the themes shown in the mosaics all point to a high social status for those who used the villa.
