= Mezzastris =

Mezzastris (Mezastris, Mezzastri) was the family name of two Umbrian painters who worked in the Foligno area.

- Pier Antonio Mezzastris (or Pierantonio) was the more famous, and the one usually meant when no first name is indicated
- Bernardino Mezzastris (or Belardino), possibly the son of the preceding, was a lesser known painter
