= Andrea Caccioli =

Italian Roman Catholic priest (1194–1254)

Blessed Andrea Caccioli O.F.M.
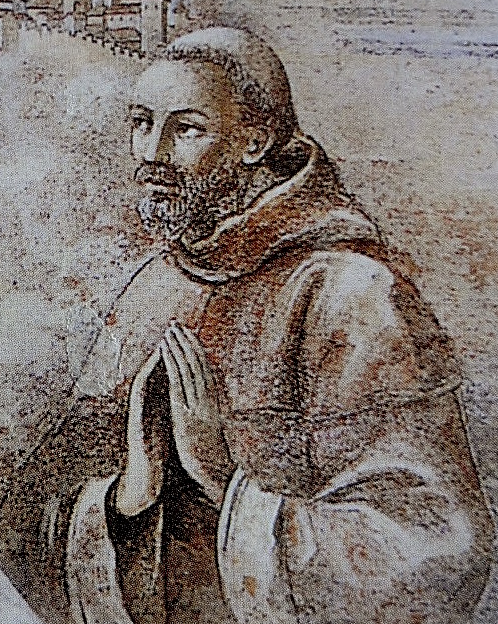

Priest
- Born: 30 November 1194; Spello, Umbria, Papal States
- Died: 3 June 1254 (aged 59); Spello, Umbria, Papal States
- Venerated in: Roman Catholic Church
- Beatified: 25 July 1738, Saint Peter's Basilica, Papal States by Pope Clement XII
- Feast: 3 June
- Attributes: Franciscan habit
- Patronage: Spello

Andrea Caccioli (30 November 1194 – 3 June 1254) was an Italian Roman Catholic priest and a professed member from the Order of Friars Minor. He became the first priest to enter the Franciscans and served as one of the disciples of Francis of Assisi himself — the priest was at his deathbed and attended his canonization. The friar preached across Italian cities such as Rome and Padua as well as in France and he became noted for miracles performed during his lifetime.

His beatification received formal ratification from Pope Clement XII in 1738 after the pontiff confirmed that there existed a spontaneous local 'cultus' - otherwise known as enduring veneration - to the late friar. He has been the patron of Spello - his hometown - since 1360.

== Life ==
Andrea Caccioli was born in the Umbria province - in the peasant town dubbed Spello - on 30 November 1194 to nobles and was named in honor of Andrew the Apostle. He was baptized in December 1194.

He commenced his studies for the priesthood in his adolescence and received his ordination as a priest from the Bishop of Spoleto Nicola Porta in 1216. In 1217 he became a pastor for Spello in the local parish of San Severino. He met Francis of Assisi in 1219 at Spoleto at the convent of Santa Maria di Vallegloria and in 1223 decided to join Francis's Order of Friars Minor.

He became part of the Order of Friars Minor in 1223 after the death of his parents and sister and he received the habit from Francis himself before commencing a period of the novitiate from 1223 until 1224. The priest was at the deathbed of Francis on 3 October 1226. He met Pope Gregory IX in Assisi at the time of the canonization of Francis of Assisi on 16 July 1228 alongside Brother Moricus and he persuaded the pope with success to consecrate the high altar of the church of San Lorenzo in the town. He oversaw the transfer of Francis' remains on 25 July 1230.

The priest attended the Provincial Chapter for the order in Soria in Spain in 1233 where it is believed he saved the town from drought and bought rain to the region after turning to God for His intercession. In 1235 he began to preach in various Italian cities as well as in the Kingdom of France; he visited cities such as Verona and Como. From 1239 until 1243 he was assigned to Reggio Emilia where it was said that he bought a dead man back to life. In 1244 the followers of the ex-Minister General Brother Elias imprisoned him due to his insistence of the literal observance of the Testament of Saint Francis though he was later released after John of Parma became Minister General in 1247.

Clare of Assisi dispatched him alongside Pacifica de Guelfuccio d'Assisi in 1248 to reform the nuns of the Poor Clares at the convent of Santa Maria di Vallegloria in Spoleto. It was there that - in a recorded miracle - he found a fresh water spring for the nuns. He later retired to Eremo dei Carcere outside of Assisi where it was also claimed he saw Jesus Christ in a vision. In 1250 he received the profession of Cecilia di Gualtieri Cacciaguerra da Spoleto in the convent of Santa Maria di Vallegloria. He arranged for the church of Sant'Andrea to come under the jurisdiction of the Franciscans in 1253 and he became its first guardian.

He died on 3 June 1254.

=== Exhumation and inspection ===
His remains were unearthed in Sant'Andrea in 1594 after the friars stationed there requested to their Provincial Minister to recover the relics of the late friar that the former believed were interred close to the church's pulpit. The supposed site was marked with a statue believed to be the late friar and so the other friars called for Ascensidonio Spacca to make a sketch of the statue before it was hammered in order to get to the burial site. The excavation bore fruit for an ancient coffin was unearthed in which an entire skeleton was found in it. The Bishop of Spoleto Paolo Sanvitale ordered the official recognition of the remains on 3 June 1597. In 1603 a silver box was commissioned for the skull of the late priest. Another review of his remains was initiated in 1623 under Bishop Lorenzo Castrucci.

== Beatification ==
Bishop Lorenzo Castrucci initiated the beatification cause under Pope Urban VIII in 1625 and tasked Francesco Bongrazio da Gualdo Tadino with the collection of all available documentation. Those documents were submitted to the Congregation of Rites in 1627 though the cause closed without a conclusion beneficial to the cause in 1630.

His beatification received formal ratification from Pope Clement XII on 25 July 1738 after the latter issued a decree that confirmed there existed a spontaneous and enduring local 'cultus' - or popular devotion and longstanding veneration - to the late friar.

In 1360 he had been named as a patron for Spello.
