= Monte Subasio =

Mountain in Italy

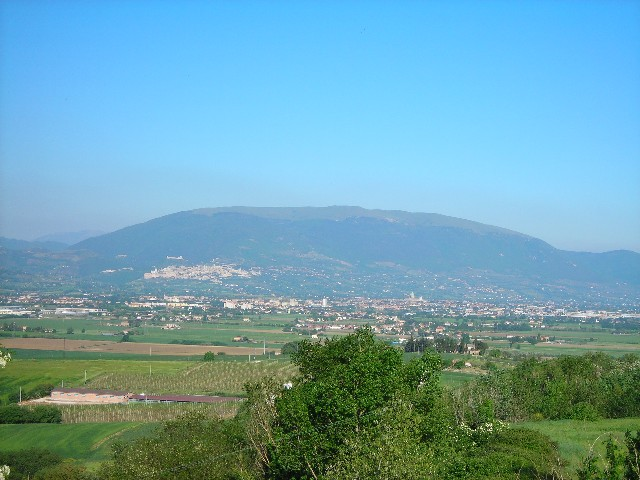
- Monte Subasio

Highest point
- Elevation: 1,290 m (4,230 ft)
- Coordinates: 43°3′51″N 12°39′45″E

Geography
- Location within Italy
- Location: Italy
- Parent range: Apennine Mountains

Mount Subasio is a mountain of the Apennine Mountains, in the province of Perugia, Umbria, central Italy. On its slopes are located the ancient towns of Assisi and Spello.

The mountain stands about 1290 metres above sea level.

Its pink colored stones were used for many Franciscan buildings at the World Heritage site of Assisi. The area is included in the natural park Parco del Monte Subasio.

== History ==
Castle Sasso Rosso ("Redrock") on the slope of Mount Subasio was the site of Clare of Assisi and Agnes of Assisi's childhood since according to tradition they were the daughters of Favorino Scifi, Conte of Sasso-Rosso, the wealthy representative of an ancient Roman family, who owned a large palace in Assisi as well.

The Benedictine Abbot of St. Benedict of Monte Subasio gave the little church of Porziuncola around 1208 to Francis of Assisi, on condition of making it the motherhouse of his religious family.
