= Santa Illuminata, Montefalco =

Roman Catholic church in Umbria, Italy

Coordinates: 42.890862°N 12.651030°E

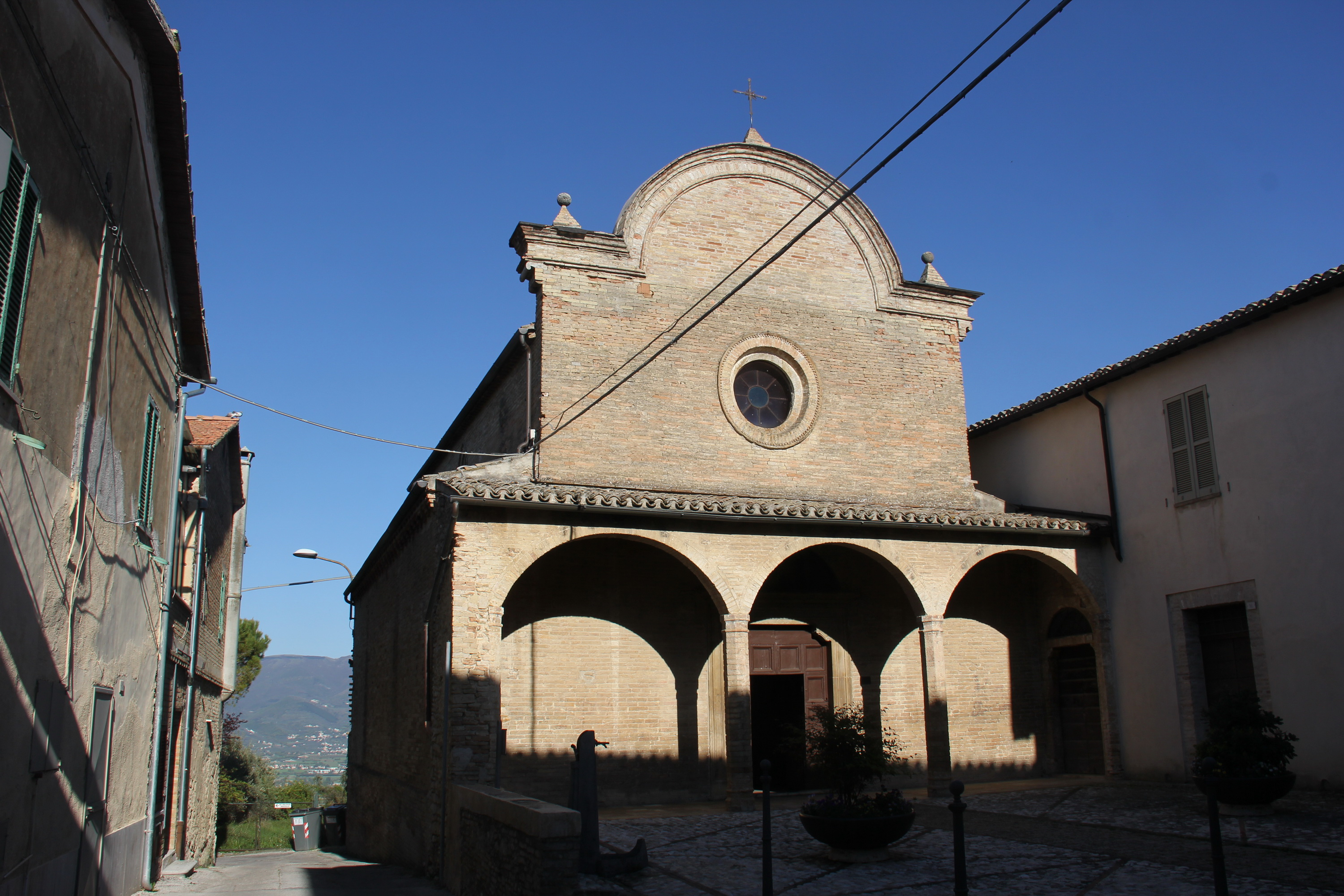
Facade of church

Sant'Illuminata is a Renaissance-style, Roman Catholic church located at the corner of Via Santa Chiara and Via Severini just south of the historic center of Montefalco, in the Province of Perugia, region of Umbria, Italy. The church, originally founded alongside a female monastery, was dedicated to Illuminata of Todi, putatively a martyred saint from the 4th century who lived in a hermitage between Massa Martana and Todi, and gained veneration in this region of Umbria. The church is noted for its early 16th-century frescoes by Francesco Melanzio and others.

== History and description ==
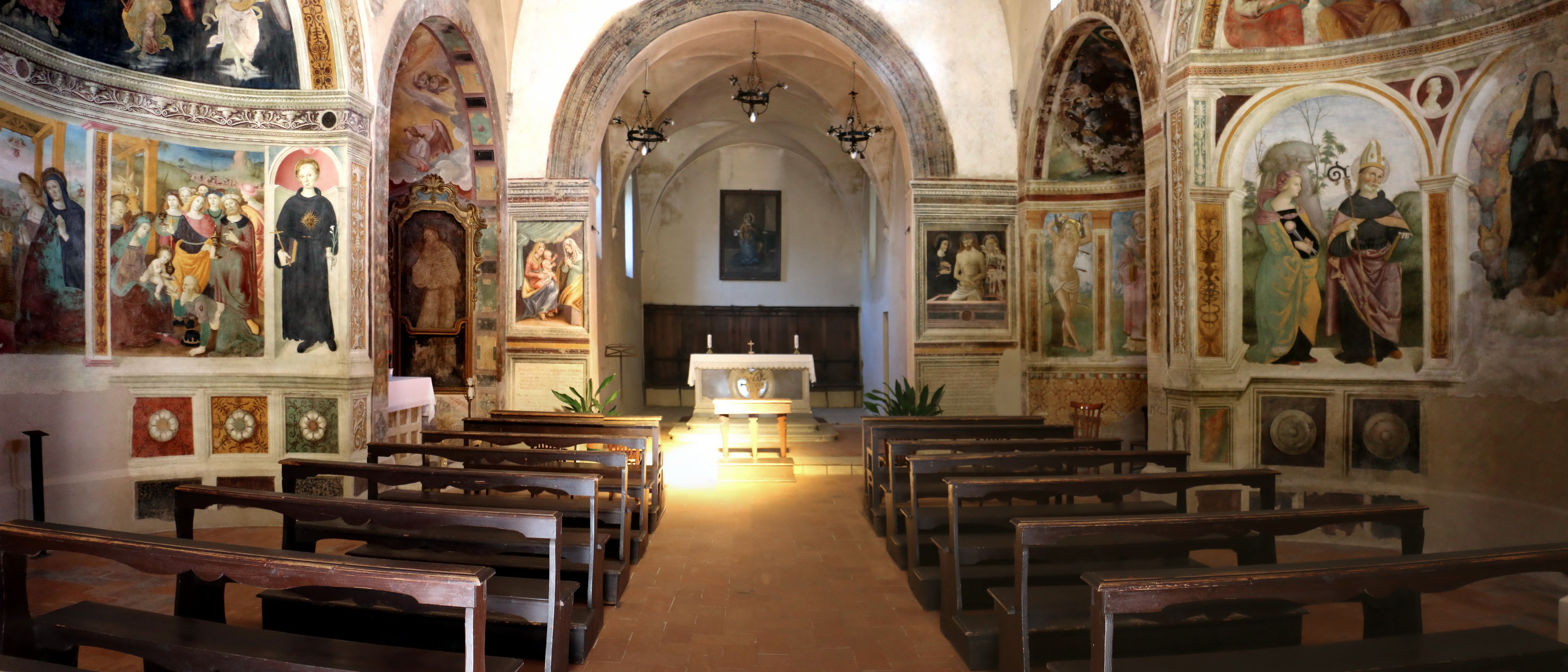
Interior view towards the apse with frescoed walls

In the 13th century a reclusorio, or female hermitage for young girls preparing for a cloistered nunnery. By 1280, the community had moved to the Monastery of Santa Chiara in town, and the monastery at this site was granted to an order of Augustinian nuns in 1302. These in turn would also be joined to the Franciscan nuns of Santa Chiara. A church was begun at this time, but work remained unfinished. In 1492, the monastery became populated by observant male Riformati Franciscans. They generally completed the church and its decoration by 1500. This community was suppressed in 1653 and absorbed by the Collegiate church of San Bartolomeo. It was occupied from 1910 to 1975 by the Capuchins, and now is part of the parish of San Bartolomeo.

Like many Franciscan churches, the brick exterior is simple, with a portico with three arches and in the upper register, a simple round oculus window. But also like other Franciscan churches, the interior is rich in fresco decoration depicting both New Testament stories and depictions and lives of saints.

The entrance lunette dated 1500 depicts a Madonna della Misericordia between Santa Chiara da Montefalco and the Blessed Giovanna attributed to Francesco Melanzio. In the first chapel to the left is a fresco depicting St Nicola da Tolentino between Saints Sebastian and Augustine, and Santa Chiara of Montefalco, the blessed Giovanna (sister of Chiara of Montefalco), Ste Catherine of Alexandria and Santa Illuminata of Todi (1507) attributed to followers of Bernardino Mezzastris. The second chapel on the left has a series of frescoes (circa 1507) attributed to Melanzio. The second chapel on the right is also attributed to Melanzio, and depicts an Assumption of the Virgin with Saints Agatha, Lucy, Augustine, and Gregory the Great and a Coronation of the Virgin with the four evangelists (1507). To Melanzio is also attributed the frescoes in the apse depicting a Pietà and a Mary Magdalen (1509).

Formerly the main altarpiece was a St Vincent of Saragossa, Santa Illuminata, and Saint Nicola da Tolentino (1488) by Antoniazzo Romano. This painting, originally depicting respectively, St Vincent, St Catherine of Alexandria, and St Antony of Padua, and originally hung in the chapel of St Catherine of Santa Maria del Popolo in Rome, but was moved to this church in 1491 by request of Anselmo da Montefalco, the general of the Augustinian Frati. The altarpiece was repainted to change two of the saints. The third altarpiece to the left once held a work attributed to Melozzo da Forlì, now in display at the town's civic museum in San Francesco.

== Gallery ==
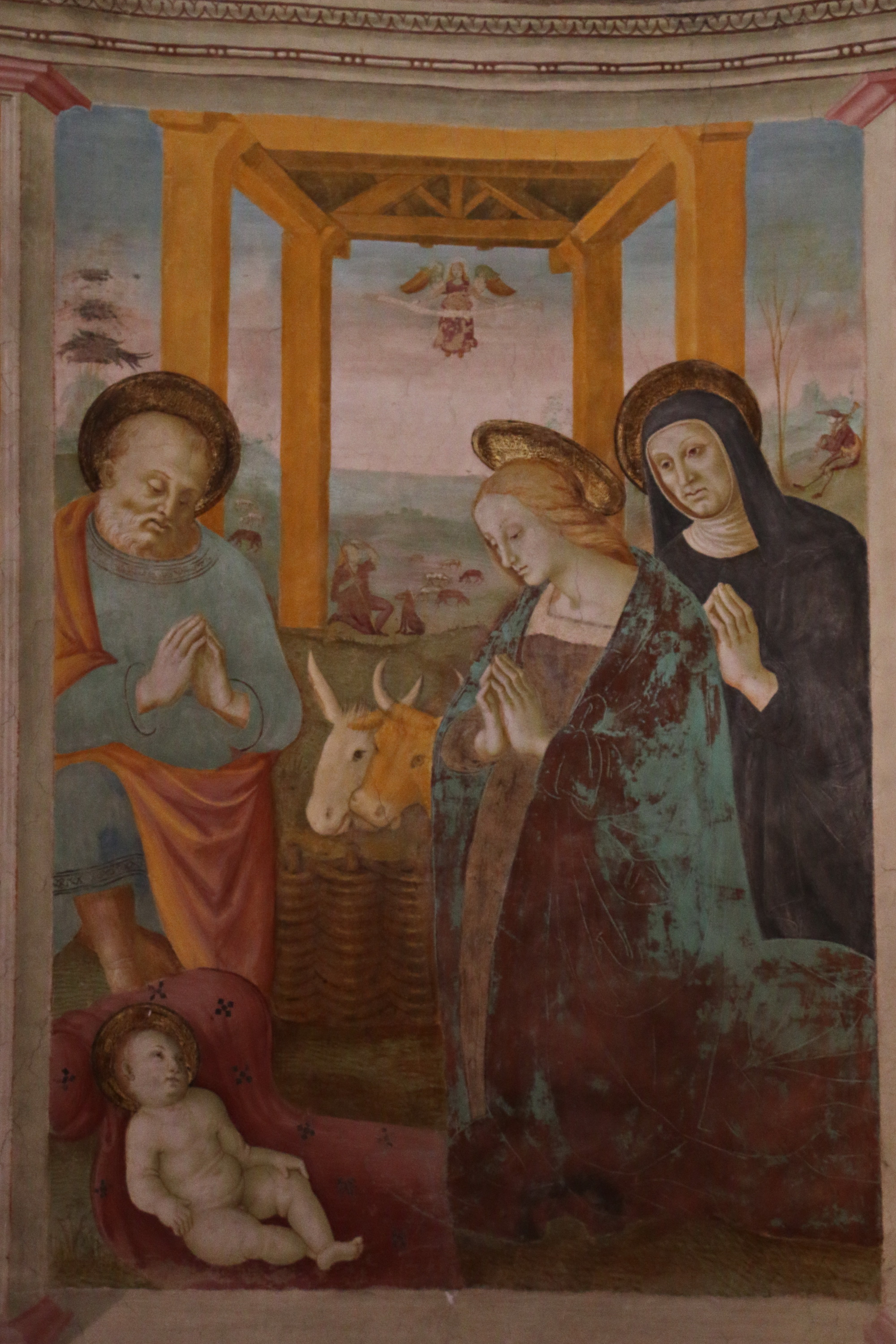
Nativity by Melanzio

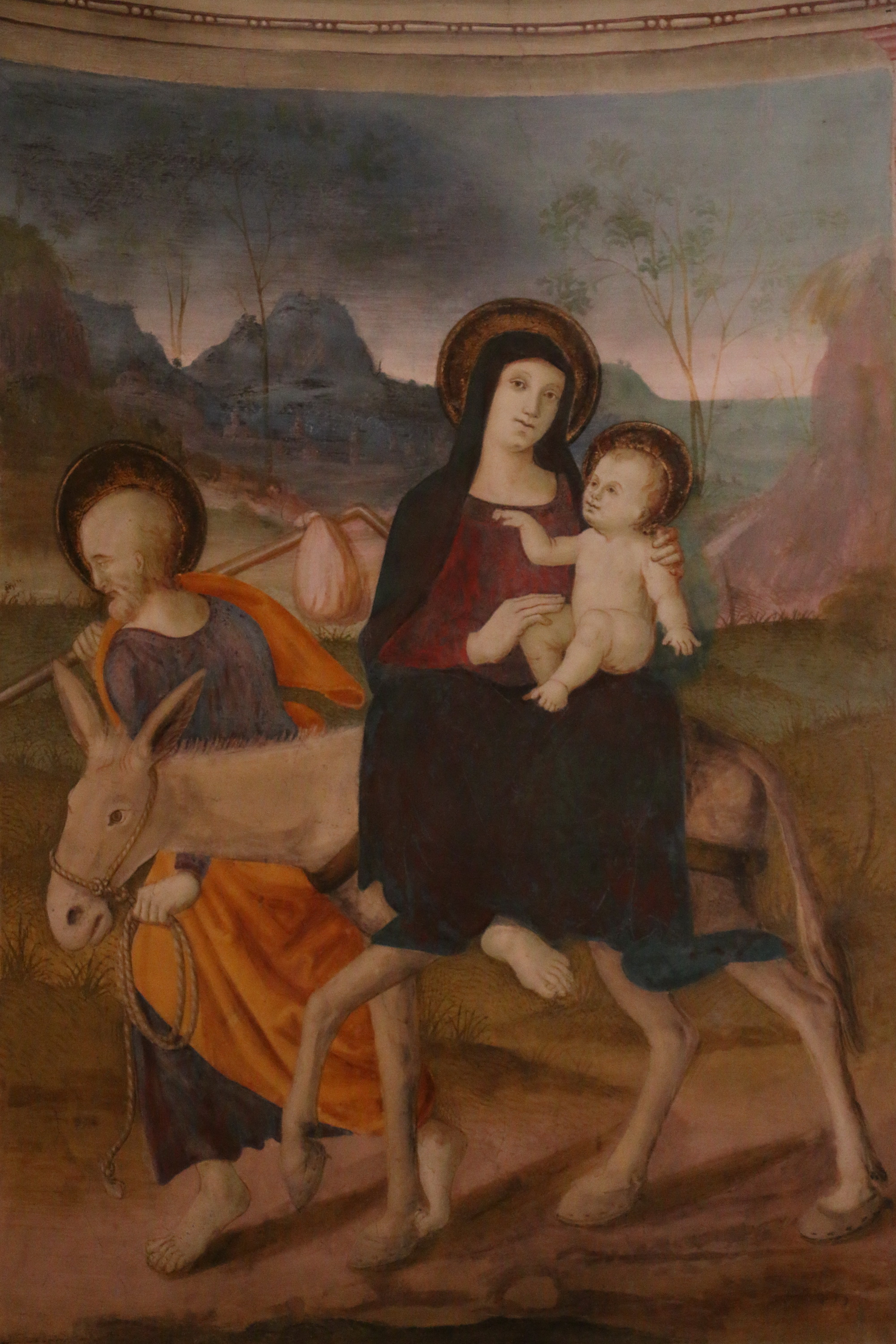
Flight to Egypt by Melanzio

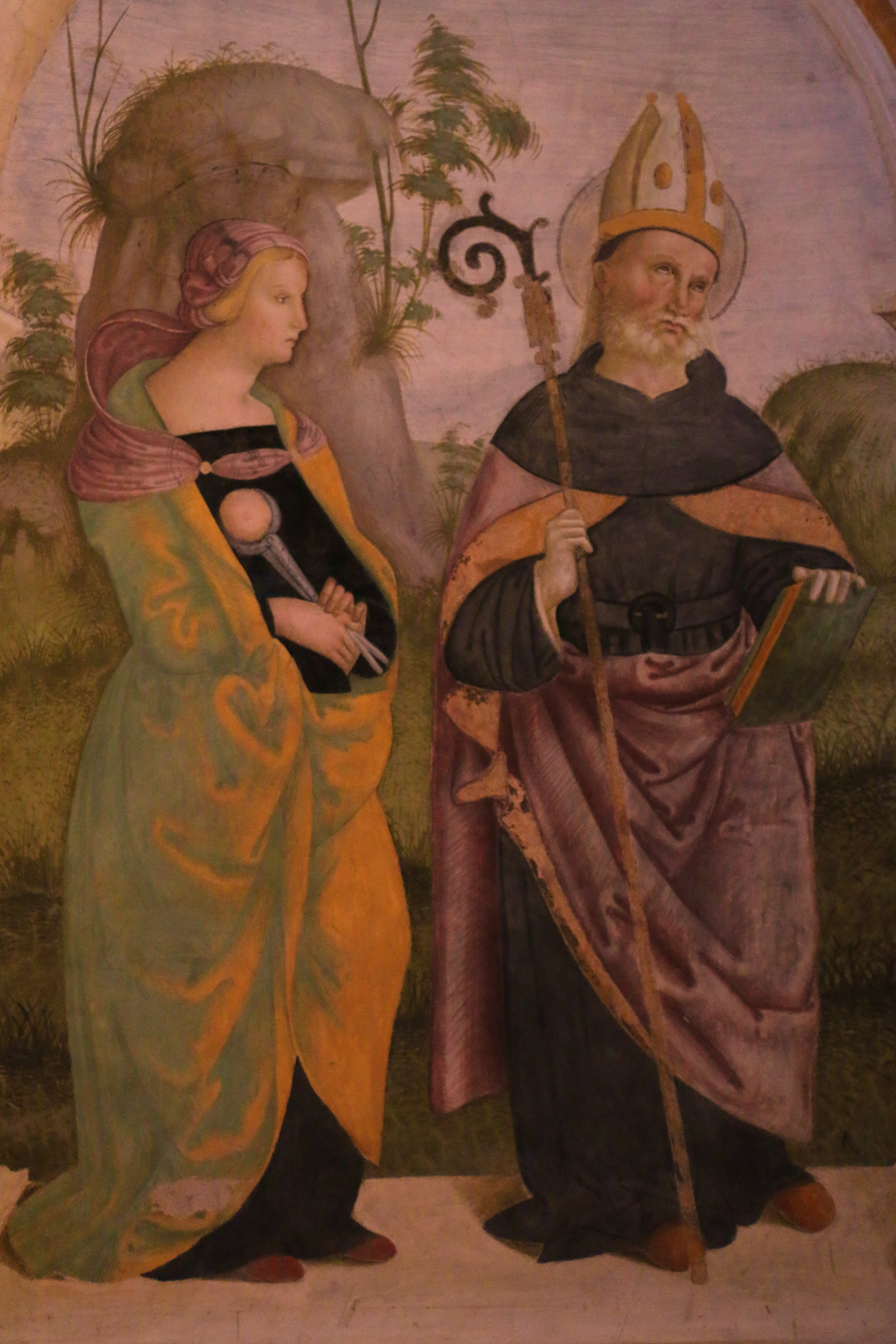
St Lucy and St Gregory the Great by Mezzastris

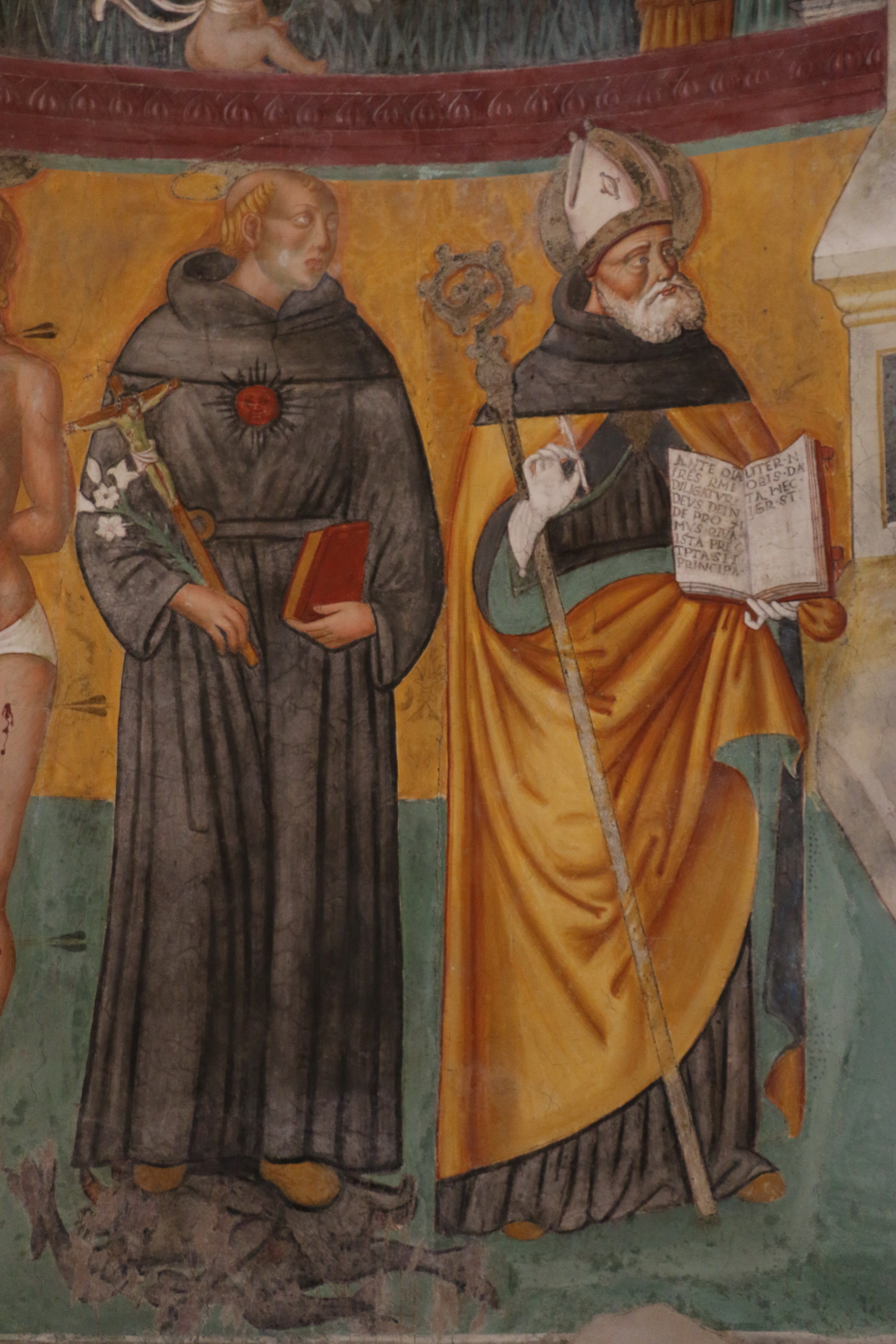
St Nicola da Tolentino and St Augustine by Mezzastris
