= Sant'Agostino, Montefalco =

Roman Catholic church in Perugia, region of Umbria, Italy

Coordinates: 42.893511°N 12.650947°E

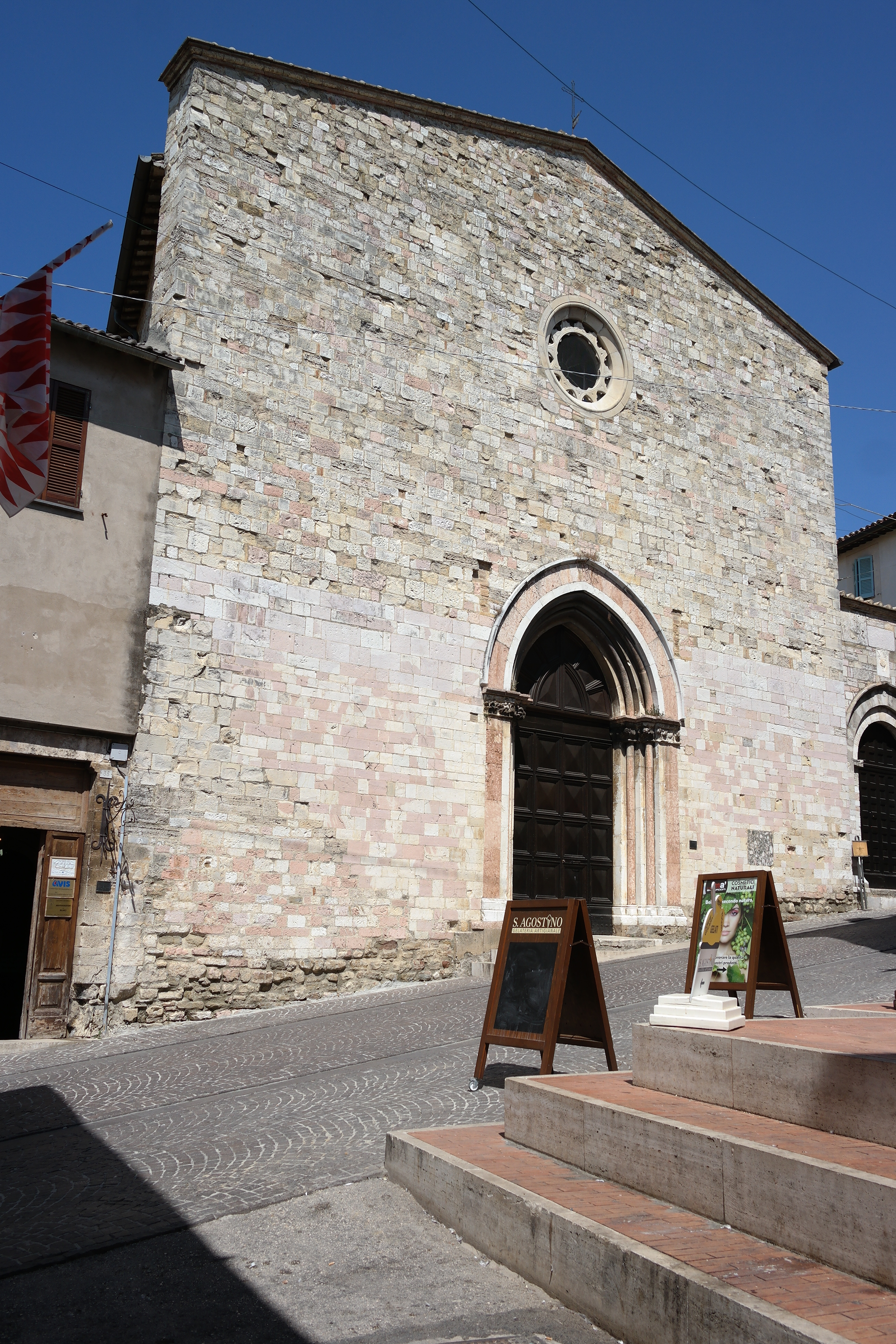
Stone facade of Sant'Agostino

Sant'Agostino is a gothic-style, Roman Catholic church located on Corso Goffredo Mameli #28 in the historic center of Montefalco, in the Province of Perugia, region of Umbria, Italy.

== History and description ==
In 1275 the Augustinians acquired a plot of land just outside the first city wall, where they built a small church. Atop this site, in 1279, a larger church was commissioned by Fra Angelo de' Conti from Foligno and completed in 1285.

The plain faċade is made from white and pink stone bricks from quarries in Subasio. The only decoration is the ogival portal with recessing Corinthian-style pilasters, whose capitals are bundles of flora. The front has a small rose window rebuilt using as a model original fragments. In 1327, and additional nave was added on the right with a large portal. Above the portal are the coat of arms of Pope John XXII, placed here by Jean d'Amiel, rector of the Duchy of Spoleto. To the left of the church is the former brick convent of Augustinians, built in 1496.

The interior central nave is open but flanked by heavy rounded arches and shallow altars on the left, and the accessory nave with ogival arches on the right. At the semicircular ribbed apse, there is a large frescoes arch wall. Light enters through a series of thin stain glass windows. In 1489, the bell-tower collapsed toward the nave, this led to both a lower roof and the placement of additional roof buttressing. In a 1452 fresco by Benozzo Gozzoli in the apse of San Francesco, is a depiction of the church with its taller nave.

In the interior, among the frescoes that remain is one on the left wall that depicts a Madonna della Misericordia (1400s) attributed to Giovanni di Corraduccio. The next niche was painted by Bernardino Mezzastris. Finally a fresco with a Coronation of the Virgin (15th-century) is attributed to Ambrogio Lorenzetti; a Madonna della Cintola between two Saints (1522) is attributed to Giovanni Battista Caporali; a Madonna with Child between San Agostino and the Blessed Angelo da Foligno attributed to the Foligno Ugolino di Gisberto.

On the right wall is a face of the Madonna and a Madonna with Child by Melanzio and the chapel of the Sacrament was frescoed (second half of the 15th century) by Jacopo di Vinciolo. The church contains the relics of the "Beato Pellegrino" and the "Beate Chiarelle", both disciples of Santa Chiara della Croce da Montefalco.
