= Pozzo, Umbria =

Populated place in Umbria, Italy

Coordinates: 42.90524°N 12.5079°E

Pozzo is a frazione in the municipality of Gualdo Cattaneo in the Province of Perugia, Umbria. It stands at an elevation of 426 metres (1,398 ft) above sea level and had a population of 222 inhabitants at the 2021 census. (Note: To obtain the data from the website: 1. Select "Basi Territoriali 2021: Confini amministrativi, Località, Sezioni di censimento, Aree SubCom".; 2. Use the search function to find the desired place.; 3. Click the Attribute Table icon in the top-right corner.; 4. In the panel that appears at the bottom of the page, select "Località 2021".)

== History ==
In the late Middle Ages and during the 15th and 16th centuries, Pozzo was contested between the communes of Bevagna and Todi, particularly in relation to control of nearby churches and surrounding land. In 1473 the Priors of Todi wrote to the Governor of Foligno to prevent the people of Bevagna from claiming rights over the church of Santa Maria del Monte near Pozzo, which belonged to the Comune of Todi. In 1526 armed men from Bevagna, accompanied by inhabitants of Torre del Colle, carried out raids in the contested territory, seizing livestock and taking it back to Bevagna.

In 1859, Pozzo had a population of 351 inhabitants, grouped into 65 families living in 59 houses.

== Geography ==
Pozzo is a small fortified village overlooking the valley of the Puglia River, opposite Pomonte, in the area between Bevagna and Todi. It stands among extensive olive groves and enjoys a wide view over the Attone valley.

== Economy ==
Olive cultivation has long been the principal agricultural activity in the area and remains closely associated with the village's identity.

== Religion ==
The parish church of Santa Maria del Popolo, built in the 16th century and later modified, stands on the main square. It has a single nave with Baroque side altars and decorative features largely shaped by 20th-century restoration.

Outside the village is the rural church of Santa Maria, dating to the 13th century. The stone building has a simple gabled façade with a small bell gable and contains a fresco of the Madonna and Child dated 1594.

== Culture ==
A traditional celebration marking the end of the olive harvest, known locally as the "bonfinita", involved communal gatherings and the preparation of fritters. This custom survives today in the form of a summer festival dedicated to the local specialty.
