= Angelo da Foligno =

Blessed Angelo da Foligno O.S.A.

Priest
- Born: 1226; Foligno, Umbria, Papal States
- Died: 27 August 1312 (aged 86); Foligno, Umbria, Papal States
- Venerated in: Catholic Church
- Beatified: 11 March 1891, Saint Peter's Basilica, Kingdom of Italy by Pope Leo XIII
- Feast: 27 August; 6 September (Augustinians)
- Attributes: Augustinian habit

Angelo of Foligno (1226 - 27 August 1312) - born Angelo Conti - was an Italian Catholic priest and a professed friar of the Order of Saint Augustine. Conti was part of the order of John the Good though became a mainstream Augustinian in 1256 after the Grand Union of the order. He was a close friend of both Saint Nicholas of Tolentino and Blessed Ugolino da Gualdo Cattaneo.

The beatification was confirmed on 11 March 1891 under Pope Leo XIII by a decree of 'confirmatio cultus', i.e. an act of confirmation of a longstanding veneration by the faithful.

== Life ==
Angelo Conti was born in Folignoin Umbria in 1226 to a noble family.

He became a professed member of the Order of Saint Augustine in 1246 and was ordained to the priesthood not long after this. Conti participated in the Grand Union for the Augustinians in 1256 and became a mainstream friar since he was part of the branch of John the Good. Along with others, he founded a total of three Augustinian friaries. Conti was also a close friend of both Saint Nicholas of Tolentino and Blessed Ugolino da Gualdo Cattaneo. With the latter he founded a friary. Conti lived in Foligno from 1248 to 1258 then from 1275 until 1293 was part of the Montefalco branch, which he established. He relocated to a friary in Gubbio from 1293 to 1297 before going back to Foligno, where he spent the remainder of his life, except for a brief period spent in Bevagna in 1306.

Conti died on 27 August 1312 in Foligno and his remains were enshrined in the church of Saint Augustine in that same town.

== Beatification ==
He was declared a blessed as the result of a decision of Pope Leo XIII on 11 March 1891 to issue a decree od 'confirmatio cultus', recognizing that there had been a longstanding local 'cult' by the faithful.

As regulated by liturgical law for a 'Blessed', there is no universal feast for Blessed Angelo da Foligno, though his Order celebrates it each 6 September.
