= Montefalco DOC =

Wine denomination from Umbria, Italy

Montefalco
- Wine region
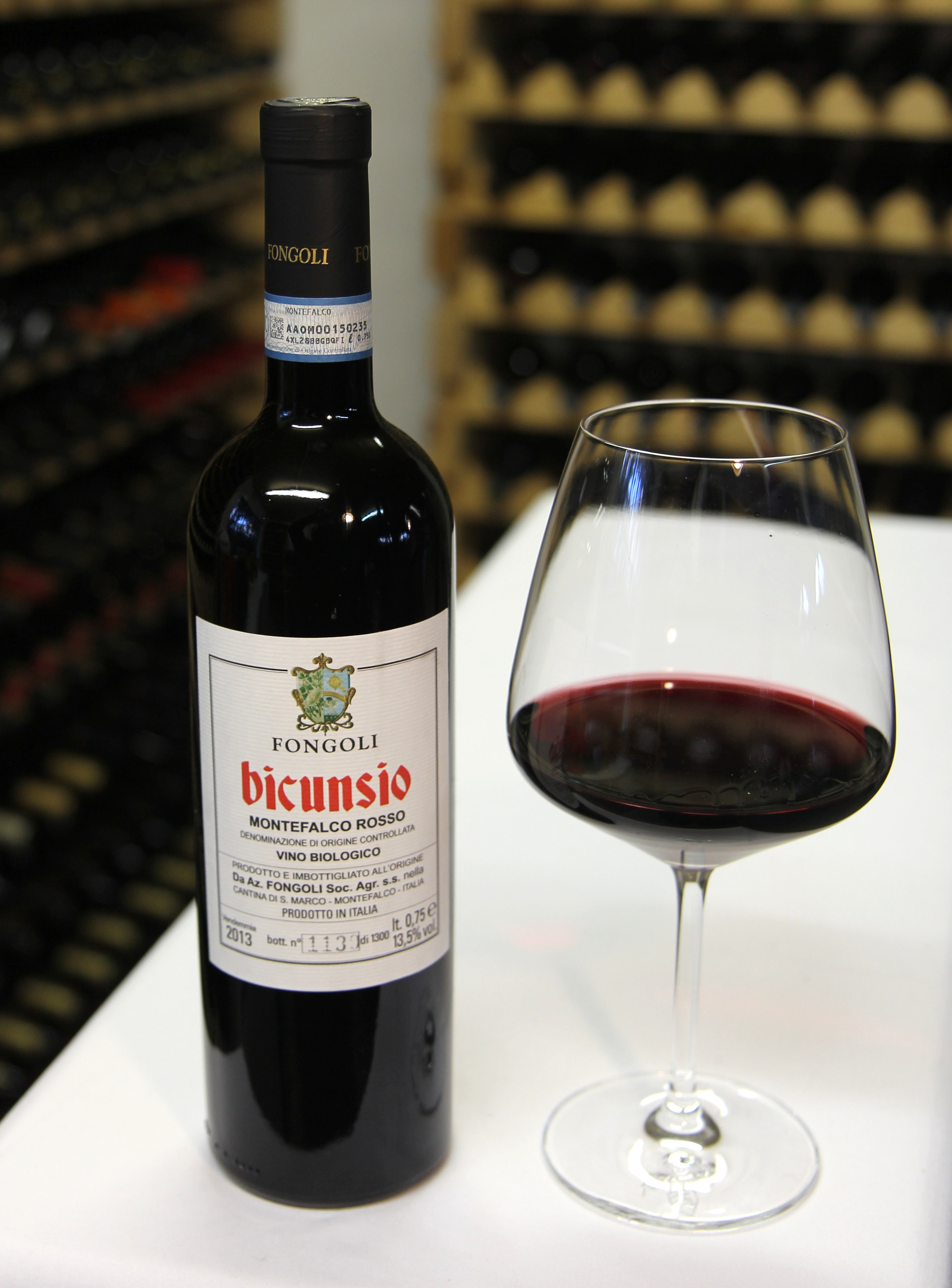
- Type: DOC
- Year established: 1979
- Country: Italy
- Part of: Umbria
- Other regions in Umbria: Montefalco Sagrantino
- Climate region: III
- Heat units: 1,722 °C (3,132 °F) GDD
- Size of planted vineyards: 430 hectares (1,100 acres)
- Grapes produced: Rosso: Sangiovese, Sagrantino; Bianco: Grechetto, Trebbiano
- Wine produced: 27,000 hectolitres (590,000 imp gal; 710,000 US gal)
- Comments: 2018

Montefalco wine (Montefalco Rosso, red wine; Montefalco Bianco, white wine) is a style of Italian wine made in Umbria, and awarded Denominazione di origine controllata (DOC) status in 1979.

== Geography ==
The region lies in the province of Perugia in central Umbria, and primarily encompasses the hill town of Montefalco. Also within the region are the towns of Bevagna in the north, Gualdo Cattaneo and Bastardo in the center, and Castel Ritaldi in the south. The wine region completely lies within one much larger DOC: Colli Martani.

Many of the wineries that make Montefalco DOC wines are located between Bevagna and Montefalco. These wineries often devote several portions of their property to olive trees, in addition to grapevines. The soil is mostly calcareous clay.

== DOC Regulations ==
According to regulations, Montefalco bianco must contain a minimum of 50% Grechetto, between 20% and 35% Trebbiano Toscano, and the winemaker's choice of other white grapes for the remainder (up to 30%).

Montefalco rosso (by far more prevalent than bianco) must contain between 60% and 70% Sangiovese, along with a requirement of 10% to 15% Sagrantino, and the winemaker's choice of other red grapes for the remainder (up to 30%). This allowance of other red grapes allows many Umbrian winemakers the ability to beef up their Montefalco rosso with interesting international varieties such as Cabernet Sauvignon and Merlot. Montefalco rosso must be aged a minimum of 18 months. Many wineries in Montefalco that make profound Sagrantino di Montefalco also make Montefalco rosso. The allowance of between 10% and 15% Sagrantino creates a Sangiovese-based wine with more tannins and body than many other reds of Italy. The result is a Sangiovese with some character and complexity.

Montefalco rosso riserva is often a rare wine, because most winemakers in Montefalco will devote their extended barrel aging to the Sagrantino di Montefalco DOCG. Nevertheless, the quality of Montefalco rosso riserva can be very high, and deserving of attention. The riserva must be aged for at least 30 months, with at least 12 months in wood.
