= Fortunatus of Spoleto =

Italian parish priest and saint

Saint Fortunatus of Spoleto
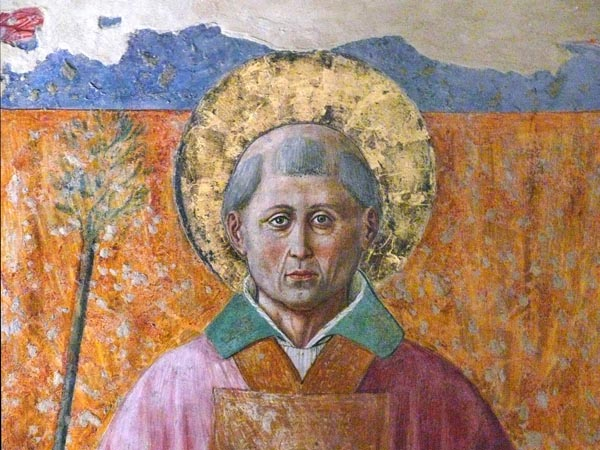
- Fresco of Saint Fortunatus, by Gozzoli in the Convent of San Fortunato near Montefalco.

Confessor and Priest
- Born: Montefalco, Umbria, (in present day Italy).
- Died: ~400 AD
- Venerated in: Catholic Church
- Major shrine: Convent of San Fortunato
- Feast: 1 June
- Patronage: Montefalco

Saint Fortunatus of Spoleto (died c. AD 400) was a parish priest near Spoleto in Umbria sometime between the 4th and 5th centuries. He is venerated as a saint within the Catholic Church: the latest official edition of the Roman Martyrology commemorates Saint Fortunatus under the date of 1 June.

Little historical detail regarding Fortunatus survives, but the Roman Martyrology describes him as a native of Montefalco, a hill town near Spoleto in Umbria. He became noted for his charity and love for the poor, despite being a poor man himself. A legend told of him states that one day, while ploughing a field, Fortunatus found two coins of apparently little value. He placed them in his pocket. That evening, upon meeting a poor man on the road, Fortunatus decided to give the man the two coins. The sunlight suddenly illuminated the two coins, making them shine like gold. Not wishing to be tempted by avarice, Fortunatus quickly gave the small treasure to the poor man and hurried away.

After his death, Fortunatus became the focus of a local cult, and the Convent of San Fortunato near Montefalco was dedicated to him.
