= Sagrantino =

Variety of grape

- Grape (Vitis)
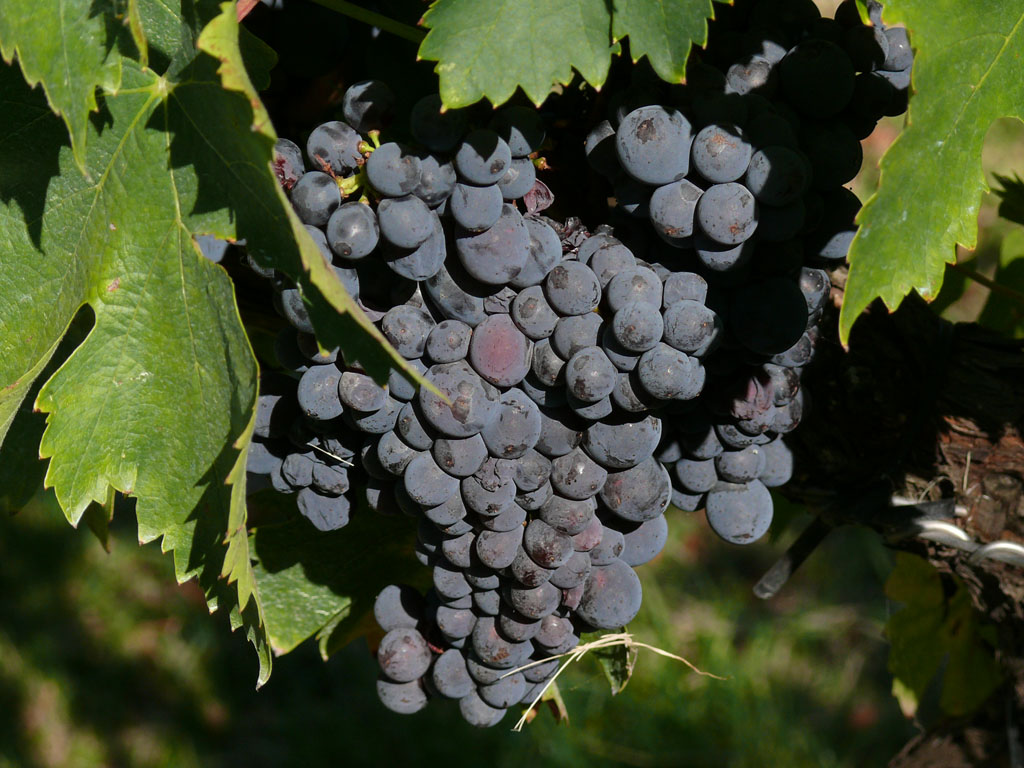
- Sagrantino grapes
- Color of berry skin: Noir
- Species: Vitis vinifera
- Origin: Umbria, Italy
- Notable regions: Umbria
- Notable wines: Montefalco Sagrantino, Montefalco Rosso
- VIVC number: 10457

Sagrantino is an Italian grape variety that is indigenous to the region of Umbria in Central Italy. It is grown primarily in the village of Montefalco and the surrounding area, with a recent rapid increase in planting area from 351 hectares (870 acres) in 2000 to 994 hectares (2,460 acres) by 2010 dedicated to the grape, in the hands of about 50 producers.

== History ==
The origins of the variety are unclear and poorly documented, but the first written record of it is in Umbria in the late 16th century as a communion wine, although Pliny the Elder mentioned red wines from Montefalco that may have been Sagrantino. The name itself is also of uncertain origin, possibly from sagra (feast) or sacrestia (communion wine).

Historically Sagrantino was used primarily for making sweet passito wines, partially drying the grapes to yield a thick, syrupy wine with raisin and blueberry qualities, much like a Recioto della Valpolicella. Since the 1970s however, the wines have been made principally in a dry secco style, with typically bold extraction and complete fermentation.

== Viticulture ==
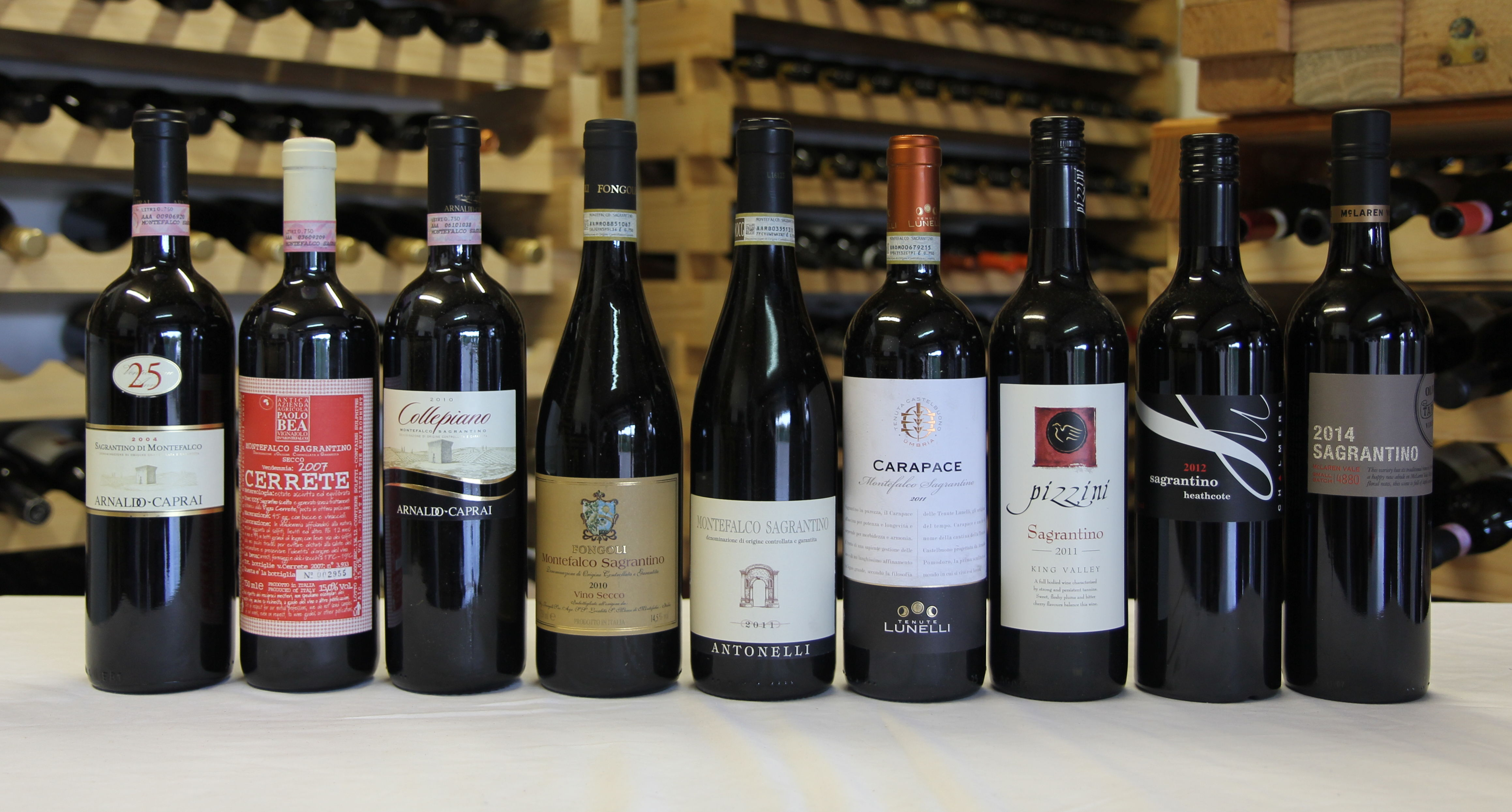
Sagrantino wines from Italy and Australia.

Sagrantino is a vigorous, relatively disease-resistant yet low-yielding vine. Although it flowers early, and reaches veraison early to form thick dark skins and large pips, it requires a long hot season to ripen, producing small slightly conical winged bunches, late in the season; in Umbria usually late October. The grape has one of the highest tannic levels of any variety in the world. Its wines contain more tannin than those made from Aglianico or Tannat, and twice the level of Cabernet Sauvignon or Nebbiolo wines. It creates wines that are inky purple with an almost-black center. The bouquet is one of dark, brooding red fruits with hints of plum, cinnamon, and earth.

=== Italy ===
Almost all of the world's Sagrantino is grown in Umbria, to make Montefalco Sagrantino and Montefalco Rosso wines. Granted DOCG status in 1992, Montefalco Sagrantino must be made entirely from Sagrantino grapes and requires a minimum of 37 months ageing before release, 12 of which must be in oak barrels. With production still relatively limited, the wine is not widely known outside Italy. Montefalco Rosso is a Sangiovese-dominant DOC red wine that requires between 10 and 25% of the blend to be Sagrantino.

=== Australia ===
Sagrantino was first brought into Australia in 1998 by the Chalmers Nursery, and the first wine to be produced in Australia was the Chalmers 2004 vintage from their vineyard in Euston, New South Wales. Figures are hard to obtain for such a small segment of the Australian wine industry, but one source estimated about 20 hectares (49 acres) of Sagrantino vineyards in 2010. Sagrantino is grown in small lots right across Australia; wines are made in South Australia by Lou Miranda, d'Arenberg, Olivers Taranga and Mitolo, in Victoria by Pizzini, Andrew Peace and Chalmers, and as far north as the Granite Belt region of Queensland by Symphony Hill and Balancing Rock. Australian Sagrantino wines tend to be more immediately approachable and "fruit-driven" with less ageing used, and winemakers employing various techniques to moderate the high tannins present in the grape.

=== United States ===
Sagrantino is being grown in small areas in the United States mainly in California, but also in Washington, Texas, North Carolina, and Sonoita Arizona. Producers such as DaVero, Benessere, Clesi, Raffaldini, and Messina Hof are growing and vinifying Sagrantino as a result of trialling grape varieties that handle hotter and drier conditions than Cabernet Sauvignon and other traditionally grown varieties.

=== Brazil ===
Sagrantino is grown on small properties in southern Brazil, in the region of Faria Lemos, a district of the municipality of Bento Gonçalves, Rio Grande do Sul.
