= Ugolino da Gualdo Cattaneo =

Blessed Ugolino da Gualdo Cattaneo O.S.A.
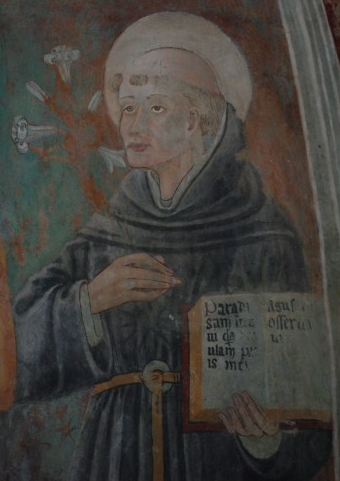
- 1482 fresco of Blessed Ugolino, painted by Nicolò di Liberatore, which resides in the Chiesa di Sant'Agostino in the Blessed's hometown in Gualdo Cattaneo.

Religious
- Born: 1200; Gualdo Cattaneo, Perugia, Papal States
- Died: 1 January 1260 (aged 59); Gualdo Cattaneo, Perugia, Papal States
- Venerated in: Roman Catholic Church
- Beatified: 12 March 1919, Saint Peter's Basilica, Kingdom of Italy by Pope Benedict XV
- Feast: 1 January; 8 January (Augustinians)
- Attributes: Augustinian habit Bible
- Patronage: Gualdo Cattaneo

Ugolino da Gualdo Cattaneo (1200 - 1 January 1260) was an Italian Roman Catholic professed religious and friar of the Order of Saint Augustine. Ugolino is best known for founding an Augustinian convent in Gualdo Cattaneo in 1258 where he served as its prior until his death. He practiced a rigorous spiritual life with austerities including frequent bouts of strict silence and fasting.

The confirmation of the late friar's longstanding 'cultus' (or popular devotion) on 12 March 1919 allowed for Pope Benedict XV to approve his beatification; Ugolino is the patron of Gualdo Cattaneo where he lived and served.

== Life ==
Ugolino da Gualdo Cattaneo was born in 1200 in Gualdo Cattaneo in Perugia.

He became a professed religious in the Order of Saint Augustine.

The friar practiced a rigorous spiritual life and undertook frequent bouts of fasting in addition to periods of strict silence as both an act of meditation and repentance. One of the hermitages he dwelled in for a long period of time was that of San Giovanni somewhere around Bevagna.

In 1256 the townsfolk of Gualdo Cattaneo began wanting a church to replace a long-abandoned convent and in 1258 approached the Benedictine monks of San Pancrazio and requested them to provide the town with their former convent. The citizens persuaded the monks to donate the convent to the Augustinians at which point Ugolino accepted this former Benedictine residence and began the process of renovating it for his order's needs. He and Angelo da Foligno founded this convent for the order in Gualdo Cattaneo in 1258 at which point Ugolino was made its first prior - the religious served as such for the remainder of his life. A fellowship was opened and named after him though was dissolved after its 1568 suppression.

He died in 1260. His remains were transferred in 1262 to the church of Santi Antonio e Antonino. His first biographer from the 1600s was Lodovico Iacobilli.

== Beatification ==
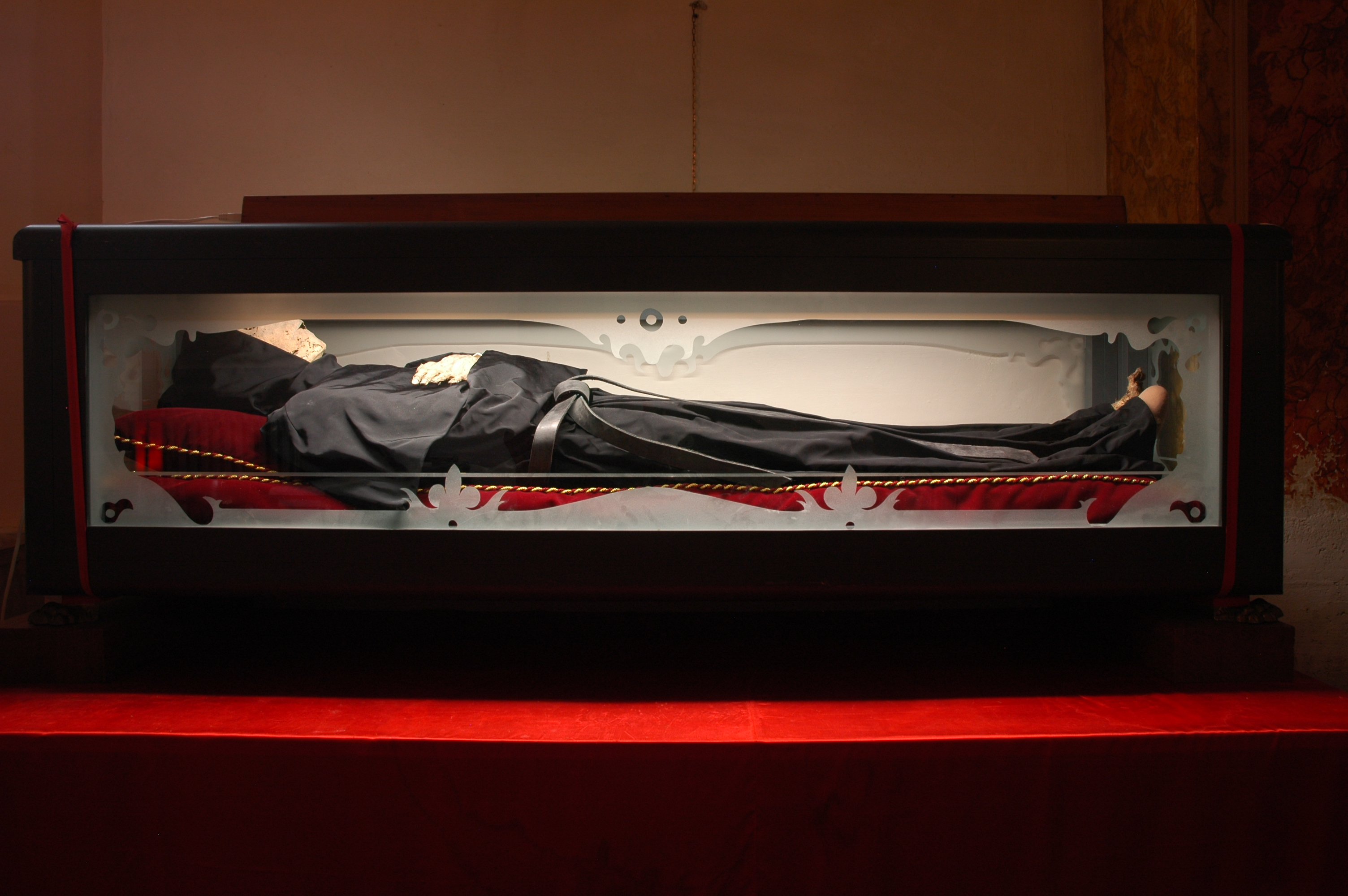
Tomb.

The confirmation of the late friar's longstanding 'cultus' (or popular devotion) on 12 March 1919 allowed for Pope Benedict XV to approve his beatification. His local 'cultus' is said to have flourished after his death though became greater after 1483.

He is the patron of Gualdo Cattaneo.
