= Francesco Melanzio =

Italian painter

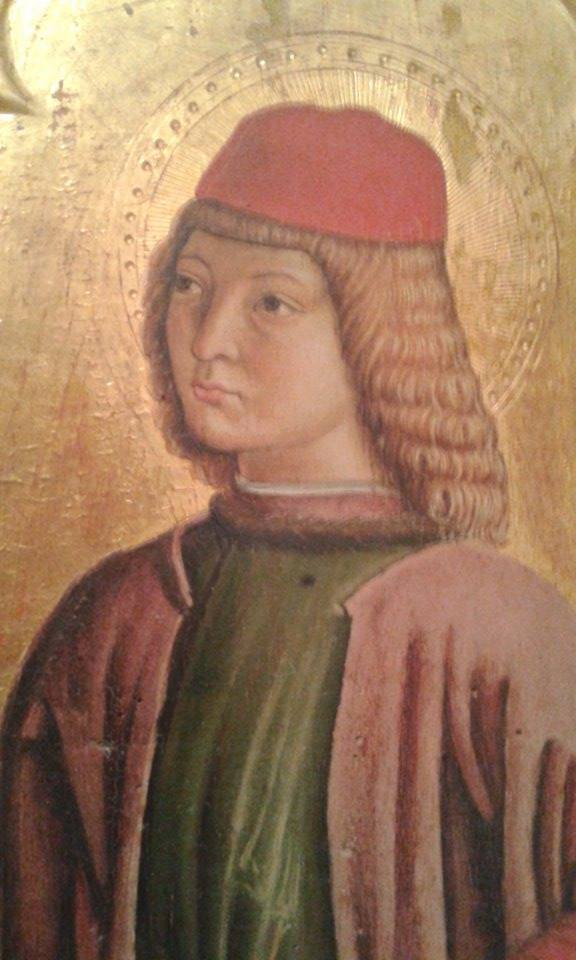
Photo of Francesco Melanzio

Francesco Melanzio (1460–1526) was an Italian painter of the Renaissance period in Montefalco, Umbria.

He was born in Montefalco, and said to have been, along with Bernardino di Mariotto, a pupil of Fiorenzo di Lorenzo. He painted extensive frescoes in the Monastery of San Francesco in Montefalco.
