= Gualdo Cattaneo =

- Comune
- Comune di Gualdo Cattaneo
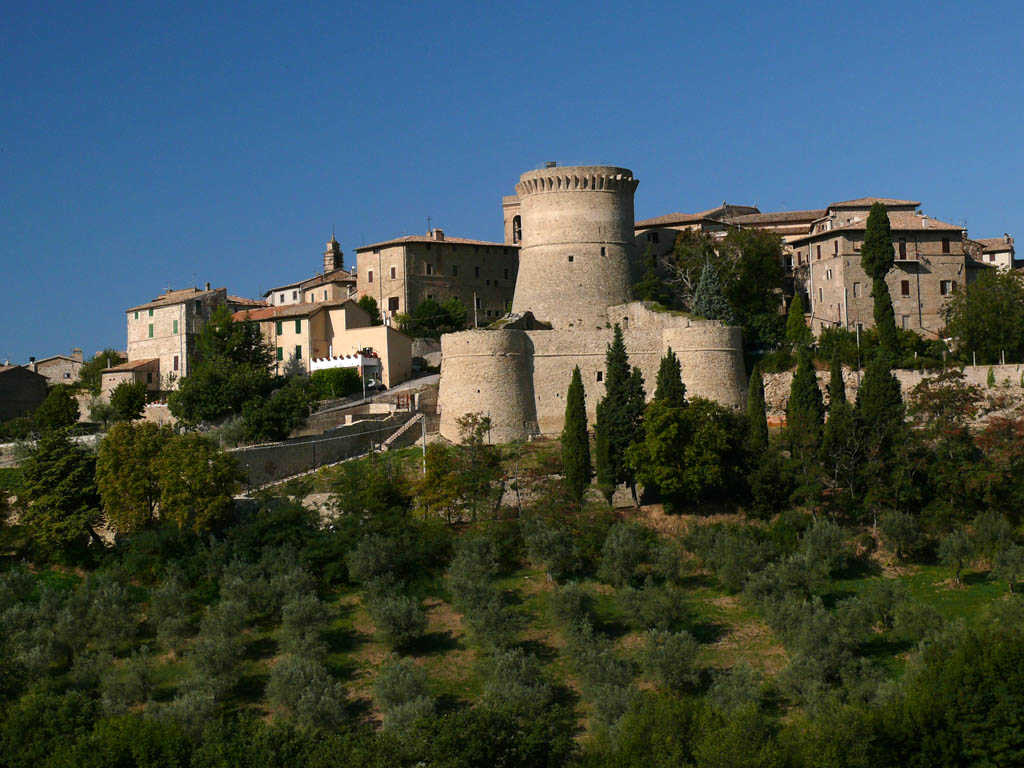
- View of Gualdo Cattaneo

- Coat of arms

- Location within Italy Location within Umbria
- Coordinates: 42.909208°N 12.556146°E
- Country: Italy
- Region: Umbria
- Province: Perugia (PG)

Government
  - Mayor: Enrico Valentini

Area
  - Total: 96.79 km^{2} (37.37 sq mi)
- Elevation: 446 m (1,463 ft)

Population (1 January 2025)
  - Total: 5,613
  - Density: 57.99/km^{2} (150.2/sq mi)
- Demonym: Gualdesi
- Time zone: UTC+1 (CET)
  - Summer (DST): UTC+2 (CEST)
- Postal code: 06035
- Dialing code: 0742
- Website: Official website

Gualdo Cattaneo (Italian pronunciation: [ˈɡwaldo katˈtaːneo]) is a comune (municipality) in the Province of Perugia in the Italian region Umbria, located about 25 km southeast of Perugia.

== History ==
The origins of Gualdo Cattaneo are debated. Some scholars trace it to the Roman period, while others associate its foundation with the late 10th century, when Otto III is said to have granted the fief to the German count Edoardo Cattaneo. More recent interpretations suggest a Lombard-era establishment, linking the name to the Germanic term wald (meaning "forest"), from which gualdo would derive.

In pre-unification records, the town appears as Castrum Gualdi Captaneorum. The term "Captaneorum" is thought to refer to the "cattanei", feudal lords who held castles through service to rulers.

From the 12th century onward, Gualdo Cattaneo was under the influence of Foligno. This relationship led to recurring tensions over local autonomy, particularly during the 1730s. The town also experienced boundary disputes with Bevagna, Todi, Montefalco, and Giano dell'Umbria.

In 1701, Gualdo Cattaneo was a feudal domain of the city of Foligno, a status which it is recorded as retaining in 1803 under the magistracy of Foligno. In 1816, it belonged to the community of Foligno.

During the Roman Republic period (1798–1799), Gualdo Cattaneo formed part of the Canton of Spello in the Department of Clitunno.

Under the First French Empire, the town was included in the Canton of Bevagna, within the Department of Trasimeno. In May 1814 it returned to the Papal States. In 1817 it was classified as a baronial locality within the district government of Foligno, and was subsequently placed under the governor of Bevagna.

In 1859 the population numbered 721 inhabitants. Of these, 203 residents lived within the town itself, while 518 were dispersed in rural dwellings.

In 1928 the frazione of Pomonte, previously part of Deruta, was annexed to its territory.

== Geography ==
The municipal seat stands on a hill, with the Puglia stream flowing at its base on one side and another watercourse descending toward the Topino on the other. Along the eastern slopes runs the road linking Bevagna and Narni. The town lies approximately 45.5 kilometres (28.3 mi) northwest of Spoleto and about 6 kilometres (3.7 mi) southwest of Bevagna.

=== Subdivisions ===
The municipality includes the localities of Barattano, Case Bacci, Case Leone, Case Tosti, Casecola, Castello, Cavallara, Celestrino, Cerquiglino, Fontecupa, Grutti, Gualdo Cattaneo, Il Monte, Il Torrone, La Stazione, Marcellano, Pomonte, Ponte di Ferro, Pozzo, Sabola, San Costanzo, San Terenziano, Santa Maria, Saragano, Torri, Villa del Marchese, Villa Reginaldo, Villa Rodi.

In 2021, 1,646 people lived in rural dispersed dwellings not assigned to any named locality. At the time, the most populous locality was San Terenziano (1,055), while Gualdo Cattaneo proper had a population of 361.

== Economy ==
Mid-19th-century records describe the area as agriculturally productive. The main outputs were olive oil in significant quantities, along with wine, grain, and acorns.

== Religion and culture ==
=== Rocca of Gualdo Cattaneo ===
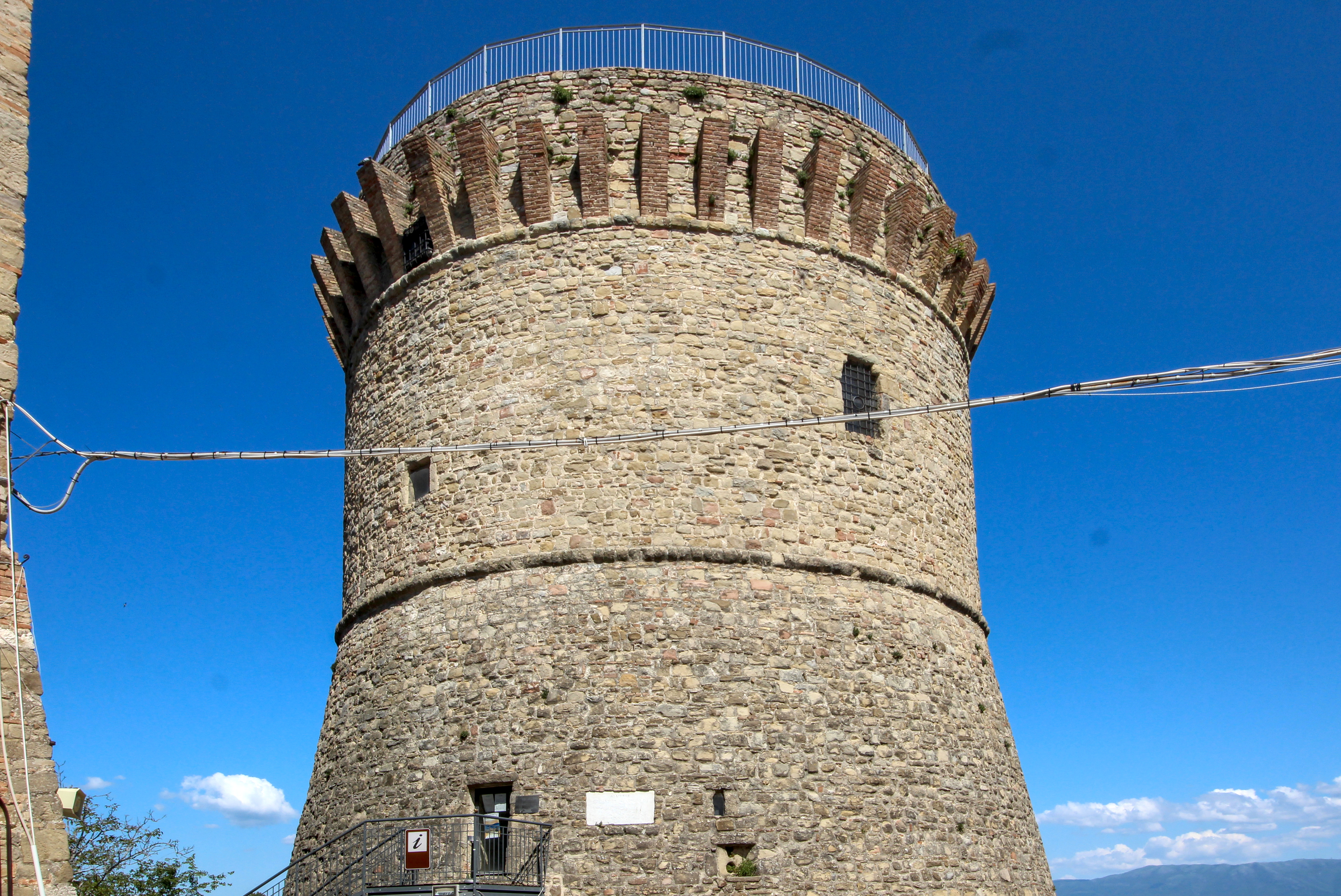
Rocca di Gualdo Cattaneo

The Rocca of Gualdo Cattaneo was constructed between 1494 and 1500 and it is also known as Rocca dei Borgia as it was dedicated to the Borgia pope Alexander VI. It is a triangular fortress with three round truncated towers connected by underground passages. The main tower rises to a height of 20 metres (66 ft), and is arranged over five floors. In 1624 Galileo Galilei visited the Rocca and referred to it as a "small compendium of the universe".

=== Church of Sant'Agostino ===
The Church of Sant'Agostino was founded in 1136 by Benedictine monks and was originally dedicated to the Annunciation and Saint Benedict. In 1258 it passed to the Augustinian hermits. The complex is associated with Ugolino da Gualdo Cattaneo. The façade features a pointed stone portal made of sandstone, above which is a sculpture of Saint Michael Archangel. The interior has a wooden truss ceiling. Among the artworks are a 1482 Crucifixion attributed to the school of Nicolò Alunno, a 15th-century painting, and a 14th-century panel by Maestro Bastiano.

=== Church of Sant'Andrea ===
The Church of Sant'Andrea dates to the 13th century and is built in Romanesque style. It stands adjacent to the castle walls and is constructed in sandstone. The exterior remains preserved, although stucco decorations suffered damage in the 16th century. The church also houses a 1482 Crucifixion attributed to the school of Nicolò Alunno.
