= San Francesco, Montefalco =

Church in, Montefalco, Italy

Coordinates: 42.8945°N 12.6533°E

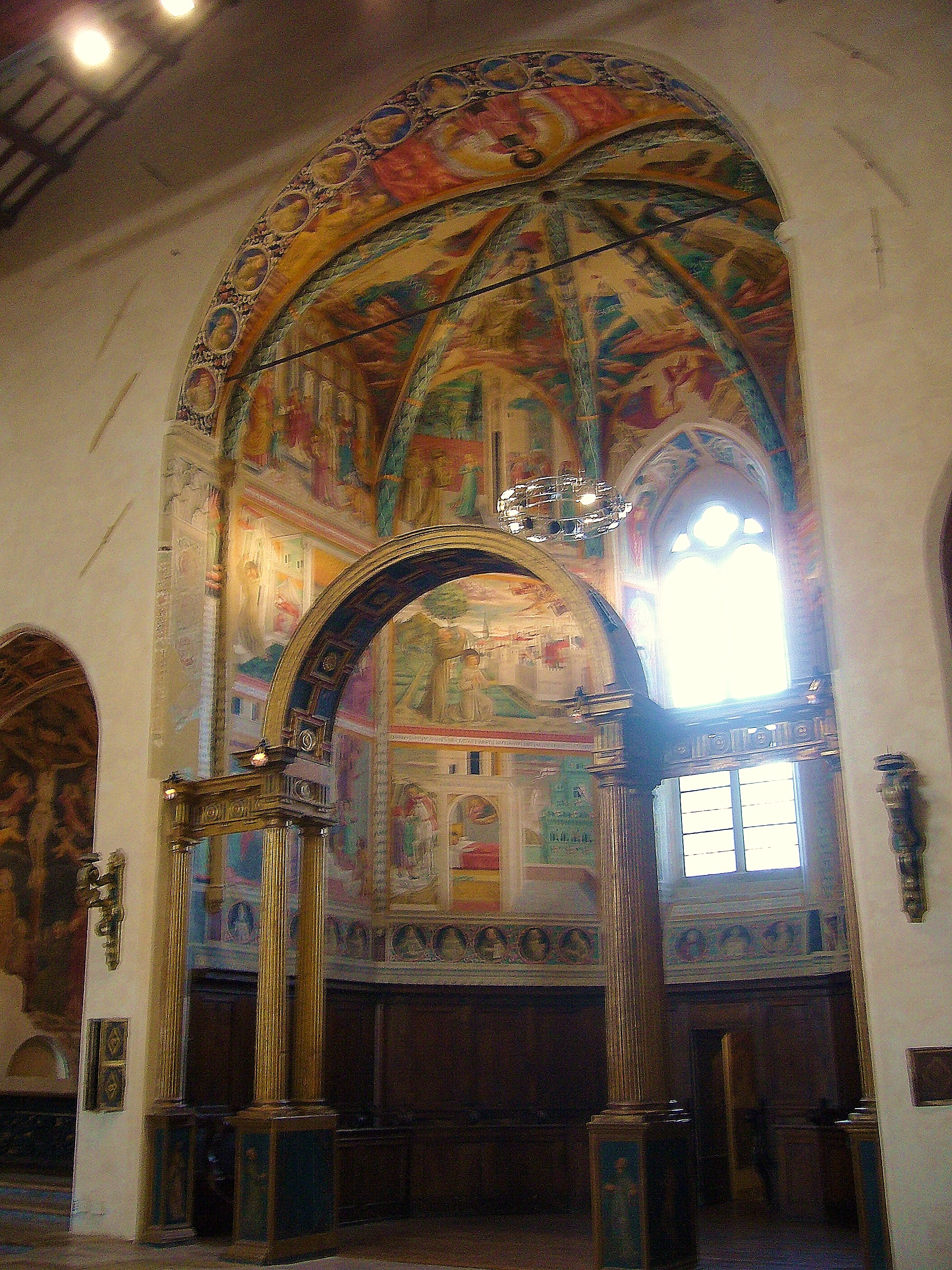
Church of San Francesco Central apse

San Francesco is a gothic-style, former Roman Catholic church located in Montefalco, Province of Perugia, region of Umbria, Italy. The church and adjacent Franciscan convent now functions as the civic art museum.

The portal of the church dates to 1585. The church and adjacent convent were constructed between 1335 and 1338. The most notable works are the fresco cycles by Benozzo Gozzoli decorating the St. Girolamo Chapel and the apse; these include Life of St. Francis (1542). Jacopo Vincioli, Giovanni di Corraduccio and Ascensidonio Spacca also decorated the lateral chapels, and the site also includes an Annunciation with God the Father in Glory between Angels and the Nativity (1503) by Pietro Vannucci, known as “Il Perugino”.

The convent also has works by Francesco Melanzio from Montefalco. The museum also displays frescoes from the followers of Alunno and Antoniazzo Romano. Archeological findings and marble gravestone fragments are displayed in the Crypt.

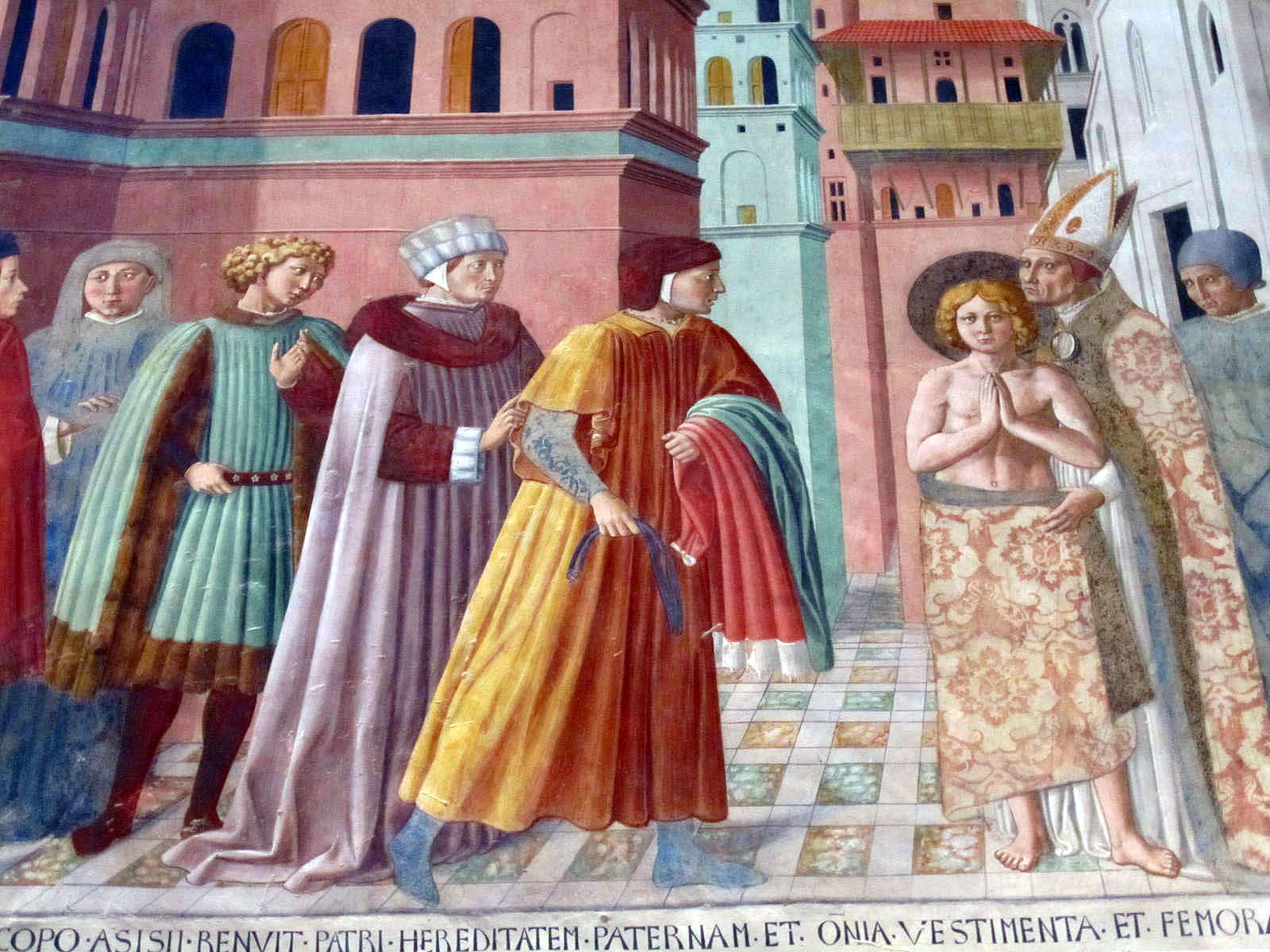
Gozzoli fresco of St Francis renouncing his patrimony
