= Torre del Colle =

- Frazione
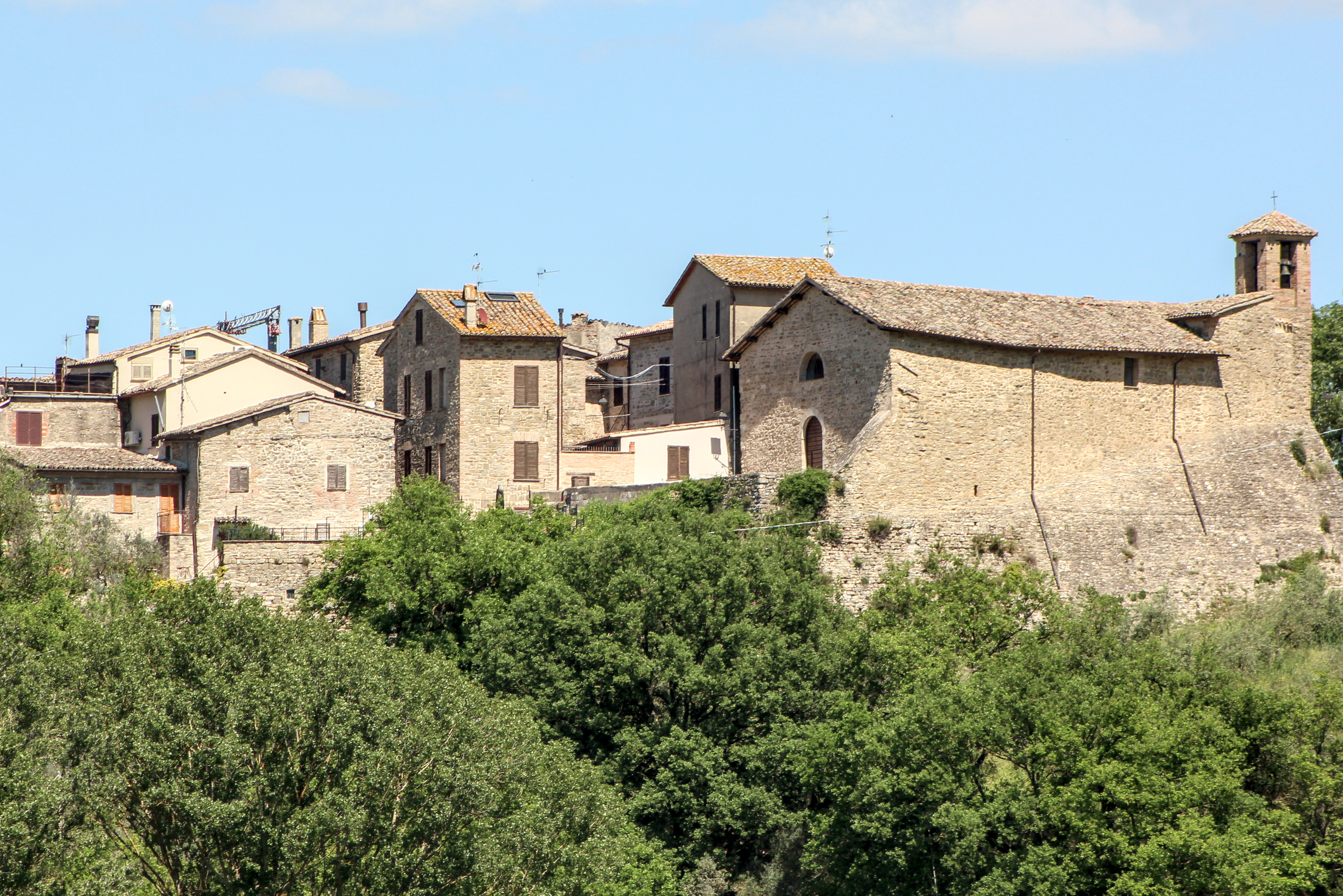
- Torre del Colle

- Location within Italy
- Coordinates: 42°56′51″N 12°34′38″E
- Country: Italy
- Region: Umbria
- Province: Perugia
- Comune: Bevagna
- Elevation: 250 m (820 ft)

Population (2001)
  - Total: 33
- Time zone: UTC+1 (CET)
  - Summer (DST): UTC+2 (CEST)
- Postcode: 06031
- Area code: 0742

Torre del Colle is a frazione of the comune of Bevagna in the Province of Perugia, Umbria, central Italy. It stands at an elevation of 250 metres above sea level. At the time of the Istat census of 2001 it had 33 inhabitants.

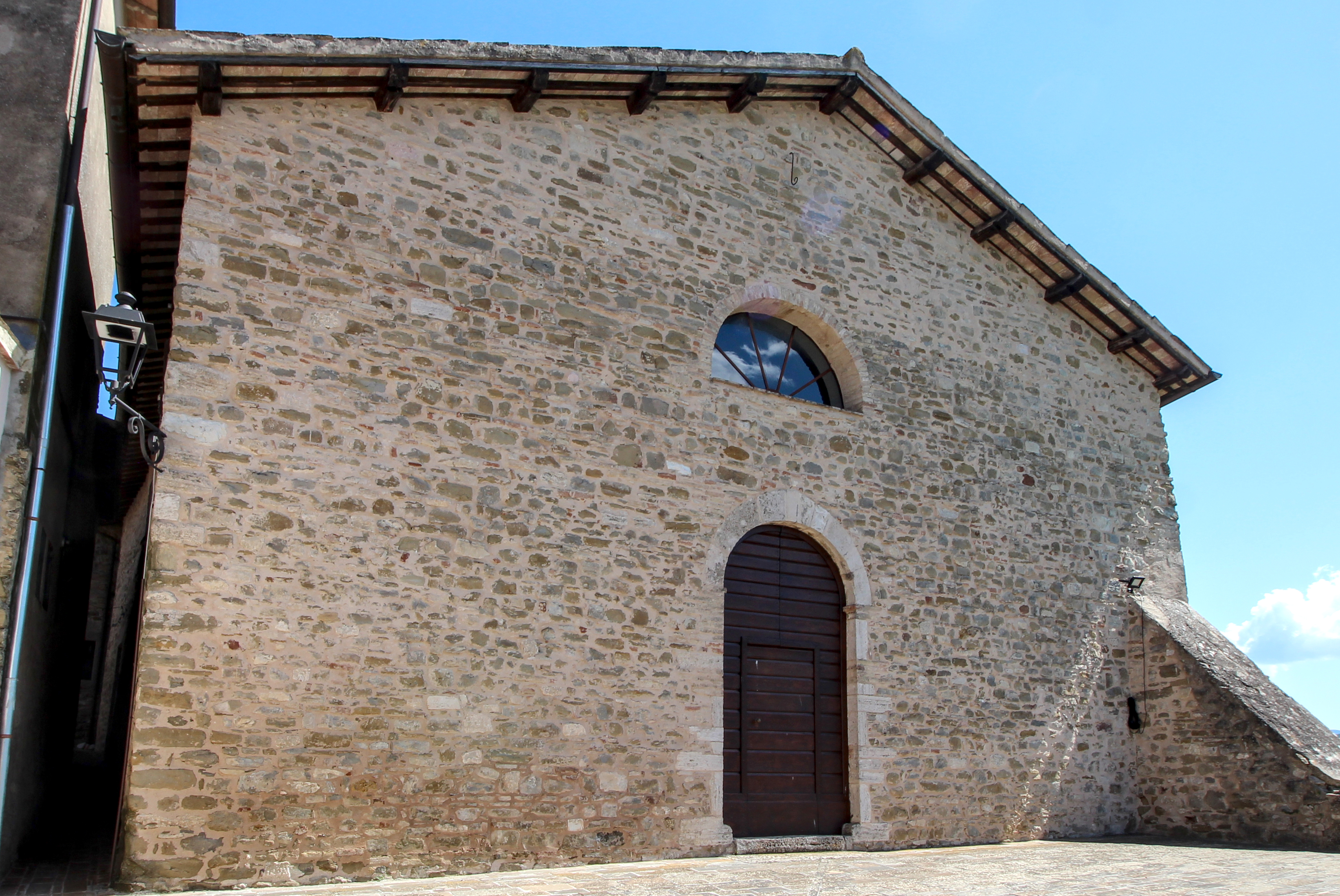
the church San Lorenzo inside the castle

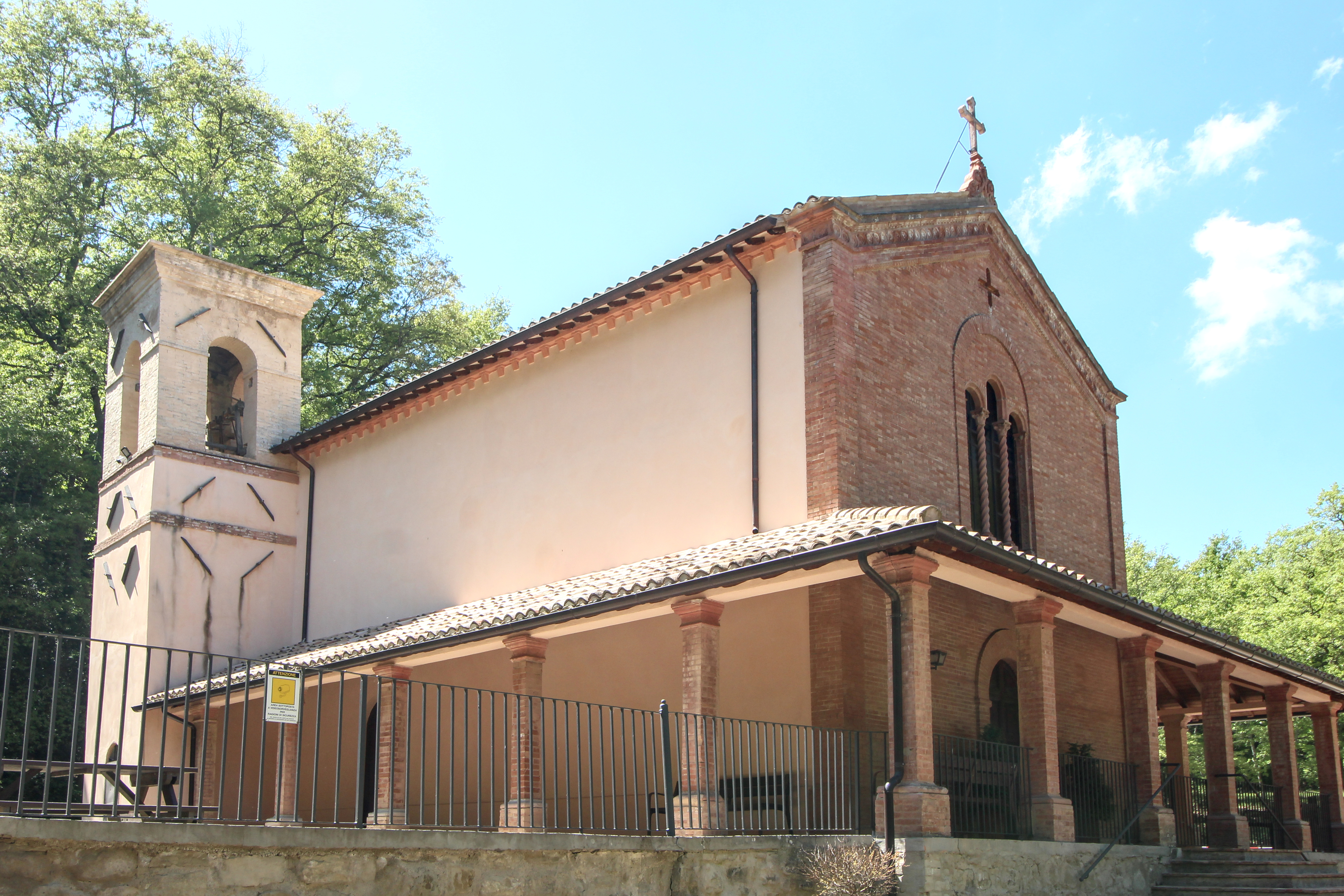
the sanctuary Madonna della Valle
