= Clare of Montefalco =

Italian Roman Catholic saint

Saint Clare of Montefalco OSA
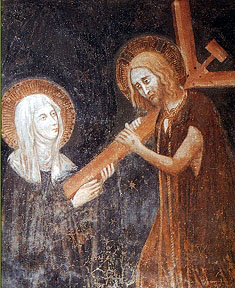
- Christ implanting his Cross in the heart of Saint Clare of Montefalco

Saint Clare of the Cross
- Born: 1268; Montefalco
- Died: 18 August 1308; Montefalco
- Venerated in: Roman Catholicism
- Beatified: April 1, 1828, Rome by Pope Clement XII
- Canonized: December 8, 1881, Rome by Pope Leo XIII
- Major shrine: Church of Saint Clare, Montefalco
- Feast: August 17
- Attributes: Cross
- Patronage: Montefalco, Caniogan, Pasig City, Philippines

Clare of Montefalco (Italian: Chiara da Montefalco; 1268 – August 18, 1308), also known as Saint Clare of the Cross, was an Augustinian nun, abbess, and formerly a member of the Third Order of St. Francis. Pope Leo XIII canonized her on December 8, 1881.

== Life ==
Clare was born in Montefalco, in Umbria, to a wealthy family, the daughter of Damiano and Lacopa Vengente. Her father, Damiano, had built a hermitage within the town of Montefalco. Clare's older sister Joan (Giovanna in Italian) and her friend Andreola lived as Franciscan tertiaries in that hermitage as part of the Secular Third Order of St. Francis. In 1274, the Bishop of Spoleto permitted Joan to receive more sisters, and it was then that Clare joined the Third Order of St. Francis (Secular) at six years old, moving into the hermitage and adopting the Franciscan habit. In 1278, the community had grown sufficiently large that they had to build a larger hermitage farther from town.

In 1290, Clare, Joan, and their companions sought to enter the monastic life in a more strict sense, and they made application to the Bishop of Spoleto. As the Third Order of St. Francis (Regular) had not yet been established, the bishop founded their monastery adjacent to the church of Sant'Illuminata in Montefalco, according to the Rule of St. Augustine. Clare made her vows of poverty, chastity, and obedience and became an Augustinian nun. Joan was elected as the first abbess, and their small hermitage (built and funded by their father) was dedicated as a monastery. On November 22, 1291, Joan died, after which Clare was elected abbess. She was initially reluctant to accept her position, but did so after the intervention of the Bishop of Spoleto.

For Clare's spiritual life, 1294 was a decisive year. During the celebration of the Epiphany, after making a general confession in front of all her fellow nuns, she fell into ecstasy and remained in that state for several weeks. Since she was unable to eat during this period, the other nuns sustained Clare's life by feeding her sugar water. In addition, Clare reported a vision in which she saw herself being judged by God.

According to Clare's official vita, she described this vision in which Christ appeared to her as a beautiful young man dressed in white, carrying a cross on his shoulders. Christ told Clare that he was searching for a place to set down His cross and believed her heart was a fitting place for it. Following this experience, Clare frequently spoke of carrying Christ within her heart.

The rest of Clare's years were spent in pain and suffering, yet she continued to serve as abbess, teacher, mother and spiritual directress of her nuns. While Clare's reputation for holiness and wisdom attracted visitors to the Monastery of the Holy Cross, she proved worldly-wise and canny in her governance of her monastery. She was careful not to disrupt the monastery's communal harmony or the day-to-day management of its domestic affairs.

In 1303, Clare built a church in Montefalco, that would serve not only as a chapel for the nuns but also as a church for the town. The Bishop of Spoleto blessed the first stone on June 24, and that day the church was dedicated to the Holy Cross (Santa Croce). The remnants of that small church comprise the frescoed Chapel of Santa Croce connected to the larger Santa Chiara in Montefalco.

Clare was an abbess for sixteen years. On August 15, 1308, she asked to receive Extreme Unction, and on the next day she sent for her brother to come to the monastery. Clare made her last confession on August 17. The next day, she had become so ill that she was bedridden. However, hours before her death, Clare experienced a sudden burst of energy before ultimately passing away at about 40 years of age in a seated position, surrounded by her fellow sisters, chaplain, and brother.

A statue of Clare is on display in the crypt of the Basilica of Saint Clare in Montefalco, inside a glass sarcophagus. Her bones are displayed in the rear of the sarcophagus, but can only be seen by nuns who have access to it. Her heart is displayed there separately for veneration.

== After Clare's death ==
After the death of Clare, the nuns of her monastery undertook the process of embalming her body by adding herbs and spices to the corpse. The chemical process of embalming was relatively common for notable individuals. It allowed their bodies to be saved temporarily for public display. After finishing the embalming process, Sister Francesca of Foligno proceeded to dissect Clare's body, opening the abdomen to discard the internal organs in a small chapel. Clare's heart was then placed separately in a box and was later examined more closely. During the examination, the nuns revealed that a crucifix and scourge, symbols of Christ's Passion, were found within her heart. The crucifix was about the size of a thumb. Christ's head leans slightly to the right on the crucifix, and his body is white, except for a "tiny aperture in the right side which is a livid reddish color." Whitish nerve fibers apparently form the scourge and Crown of Thorns, and three Holy Nails are formed by a dark fibrous tissue.

== Importance of these findings ==
Following this striking discovery, the nuns continued to search through Clare's body. They dissected her gallbladder and reported finding three round objects inside. Seeking a medical explanation, the nuns consulted Master Simone of Spello, the monastery's physician, to determine whether an illness could have caused the objects to form. However, when handed Clare's gallbladder, Master Simone refused to dissect it, stating that he felt unworthy of performing such a task. Instead, Sister Francesca opened the gallbladder herself and found three stones the nuns believed symbolized the Holy Trinity.

In addition, Clare's heart began to work alleged miracles, particularly in healing injuries to the extremities. These reports of discoveries and miracles contributed to Clare's rising reputation for piety, which in turn helped initiate the canonization inquiries of 1318 and 1319.

== Why dissect Clare ==
Sister Francesca provided two explanations for why the nuns dissected Clare's body. First, they wanted to preserve her body through the embalming process because they believed that God favored her. Although the nuns claimed that Clare's body showed no signs of natural decay and considered her incorruptible, they still embalmed her corpse as a temporary method of preservation. In the medieval period, if a body remained undecayed even after the effects of embalming had worn off, it was often interpreted as a miraculous sign of holiness and evidence of sainthood.

The second reason for the dissection was the nuns' belief that they would discover something extraordinary within Clare's body. From Clare's reported vision, she frequently spoke of carrying Christ in her heart so much that when a nun placed a cross at the head of her bed on her final days, she objected and stated that she already had Christ with her.

== Nuns' controversy ==
Although the opening of Clare's body appeared shocking, it was not the primary reason that sparked controversy. In the medieval period, dissections of corpses were not widely prohibited, even by religious authorities. After Clare's death, there was no evidence suggesting that the procedure was viewed as improper, nor is there documentation of objections from her family, local community, or prominent officials. In fact, her body's embalming was understood as an act of reverence and respect. Instead, the controversy centered on the credibility of the nuns' reported claims. The presence of a cross in her heart and three stones in her gallbladder were viewed with skepticism by ecclesiastical and governmental authorities. A commission consisting of physicians, jurists, and theologians was assembled to conduct an investigation, which subsequently "ruled out the possibility of fabrication or artifice". The vicar, who visited Montefalco as an inquisitor eager to punish those responsible for fraud, came to be convinced of the signs’ authenticity after personally verifying that these were not the result of trickery.

== Canonization ==
The canonization process was initiated in 1328, but it was not until April 13, 1737, that Pope Clement XII beatified by Clare. On December 8, 1881, the feast of the Immaculate Conception, Pope Leo XIII canonized Clare as Saint Clare of Montefalco at Saint Peter's Basilica in Rome. She was recognized as an Augustinian rather than a Franciscan.
