= Montefalco =

- Comune
- Comune di Montefalco
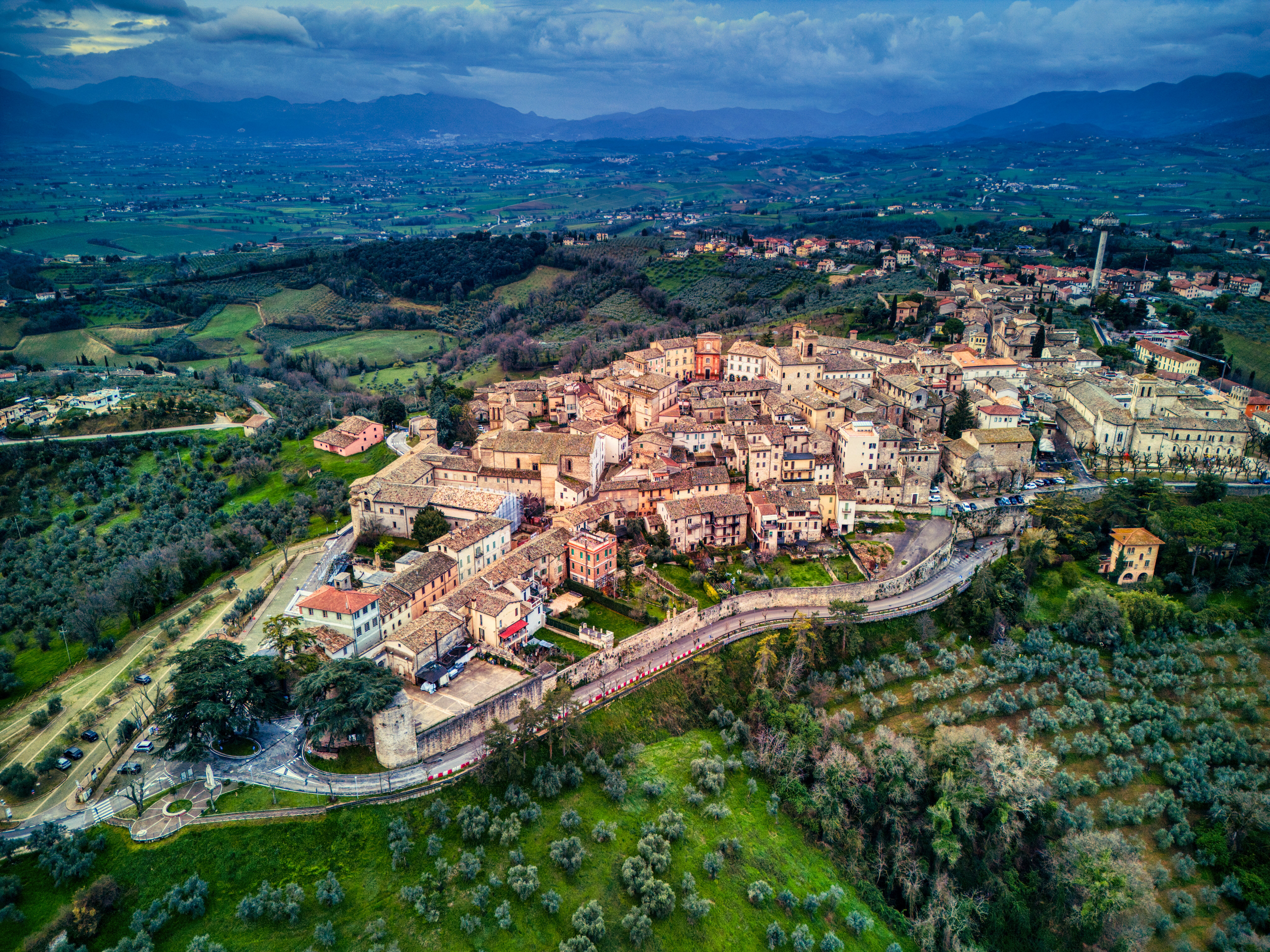
- View of Montefalco

- Location within Italy Location within Umbria
- Coordinates: 42.893762°N 12.652382°E
- Country: Italy
- Region: Umbria
- Province: Perugia (PG)

Government
  - Mayor: Luigi Titta

Area
  - Total: 69.51 km^{2} (26.84 sq mi)
- Elevation: 473 m (1,552 ft)

Population (1 January 2025)
  - Total: 5,251
  - Density: 75.54/km^{2} (195.7/sq mi)
- Demonym: Montefalchesi
- Time zone: UTC+1 (CET)
  - Summer (DST): UTC+2 (CEST)
- Postal code: 06036
- Dialing code: 0742
- Patron saint: St. Fortunatus, St. Clare of Montefalco
- Saint day: June 1 (St. Fortunatus), August 17 (St. Clare)
- Website: Official website

Montefalco is a historic small hill town in Umbria, Italy. It is one of I Borghi più belli d'Italia ("The most beautiful villages of Italy").

Montefalco DOC is a regulated geographical area due to its red grape wine production, including the highly localized Sagrantino grape variety. The town's museum is in a former church, which has a fresco cycle on the life of St. Francis by the Florentine artist Benozzo Gozzoli (1450–1452).

== Etymology ==
The origin of the name Montefalco is disputed. According to the local historians Casalio and Monticelli, it derives from Mons Faliscus, on the assumption that the town was connected with the Falisci; in their account, the town's second name, Corcurione, is linked to a Roman knight named Curione who was said to have rebuilt the settlement.

Francesco Torti rejects these explanations and maintains that the place bore only the names Corcorona and then Montefalco. In Torti's view, Corcorona derived from the coat of arms of a German knight, Ensio Gordiano, which showed a heart with a golden crown, while Montefalco was the name given after Emperor Frederick I invested Ranaldo de' Ranaldi of Foligno with the county of Corcorone and, among other privileges, gave him a highly trained falcon for hunting; the source notes a 1250 instrument referring to the place as "Terra in territorio Coccoroni et nunc Castro de Montefalco".

== History ==
=== Antiquity ===
Adone Palmieri states that Montefalco was formerly called Falisco Umbro, or Falliene, and that it was a Roman municipium. He adds that it was destroyed in Sulla's civil war and later rebuilt, being known as Curcurione or Coccorano until 1249; after that it took the name Montefalco. He places the earlier settlement about 1 mile (1.6 km) from the present town.

Palmieri also links a phase of castle-building to the time of the emperor Otto I, writing that a German baron named Enzio Gordiano, attracted by the beauty and fertility of the territory, built a castle that was later destroyed by the Saracens, after which the present Montefalco arose from its ruins.

=== Middle Ages ===
Montefalco first appears in records in 1180, when its castle was submitted to the municipality of Spoleto. Shortly before this, in 1177, Frederick Barbarossa added Montefalco to the county of Foligno. In 1185 Barbarossa stayed in Montefalco and presented the counts of Antignano with a hunting falcon; this falcon was later adopted as the town's emblem.

By 1240 the community had acknowledged imperial authority. Institutional structures associated with communal government are documented from the early 13th century, when the office of podestà was already in place. In 1270 the people's palace was built.

In the struggles between Guelphs and Ghibellines, Montefalco sided with the Guelph party and, during the period of the Avignon Papacy, it more than once sent its own militia to strengthen the arms of the Church. The Ghibelline side was led by a figure named Biagio de’ Rizzo and prevailed until Guelph exiles, guided and joined by the Guelphs of Ugolino Trinci, lord of Foligno, broke the walls by night, regained Montefalco and restored their faction to power.

Trinci then dominated Montefalco as vicar general of the Church and held its lordship for a long time. Under Corrado Trinci, however, the people rose up, appealed to the pontiff, and joined the army sent by Pope Eugene IV to depose him; Corrado was eventually defeated. After this, the pope sent the Count della Facciola to govern the town. The fortress near the town gate was demolished.

In 1464 Montefalco was devastated by a severe plague. Aid was provided by Pope Sixtus IV and by the nearby community of Marcellano di Todi, and in gratitude Montefalco aggregated those citizens into the citizenship of Montefalco.

=== Early Modern era ===
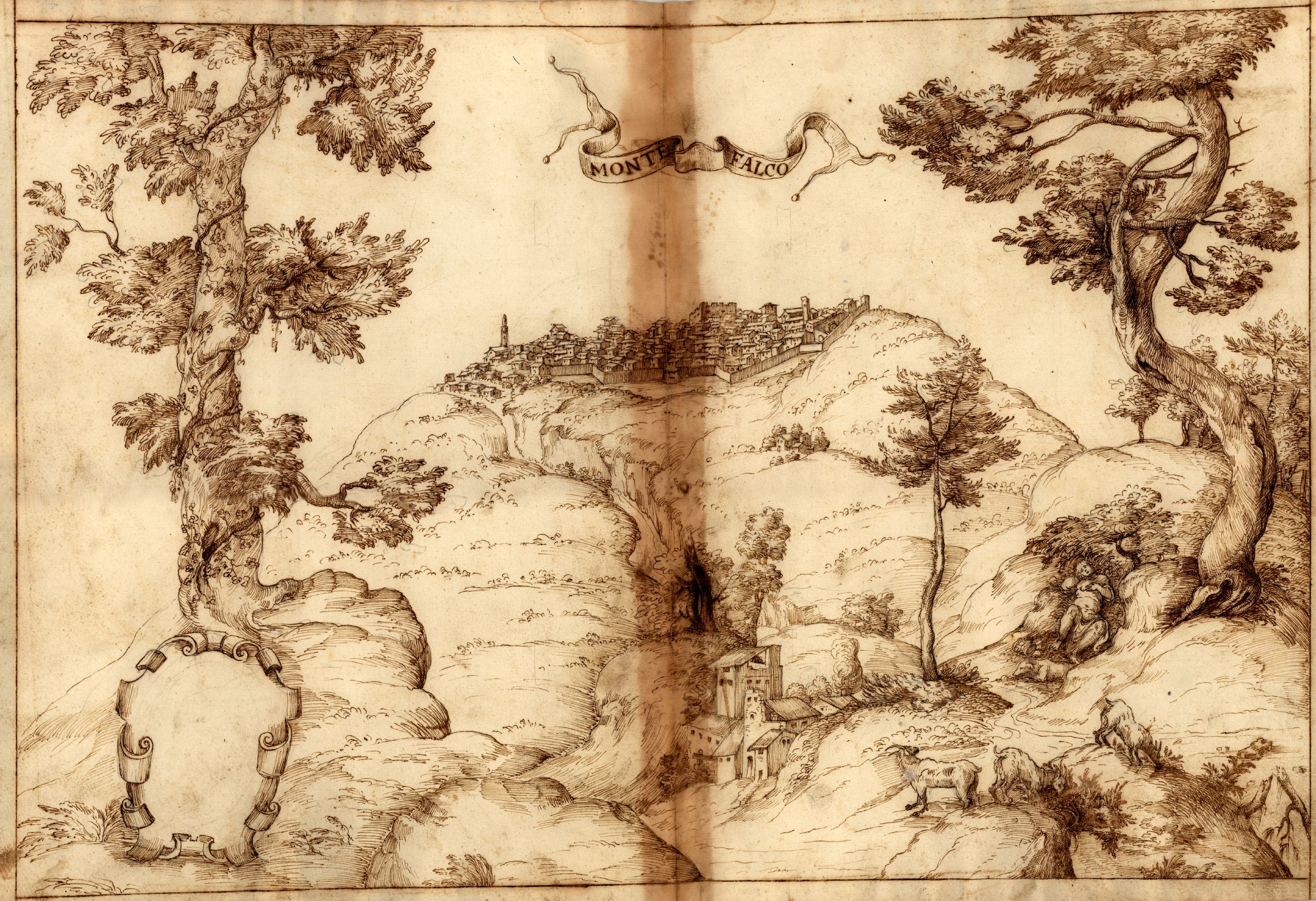
Engraved view of Montefalco by Cipriano Piccolpasso, 1579

During the time of the Sack of Rome (1527), Montefalco suffered serious damage, especially at the hands of Captain Lorenzo Martelli, one of the leaders of the Bande Nere led by the Perugian Orazio Baglioni. These hardships were compounded by flooding of the territory caused by the breach of the Pulsella embankment.

A further plague followed in 1529, and on that occasion public processions and prayers were held to the blessed Chiara. Continuing civic discord led Pope Clement VII to send the commissioner Giacomo Bonatto de Viperis, though he did not succeed in pacifying the conflicts. In the period of damage attributed to Martelli's troops, the town's Monte di pietà was also dispersed; it is said to have held 4,000 gold florins in pledges in addition to 700 florins in cash, and the town then experienced shortages of food and other hardships.

Cardinal Giovanni Domenico de Cupis is credited with freeing Montefalco from arrears of taxes, removing it from dependence on Foligno, and arranging the drainage of flooded lands through the opening of the Teverone canal and the regulation of other rivers and streams.

In 1666 the podestà was replaced by a governor appointed by the central authorities. A popular-based form of government nevertheless continued until 1820, organized around four priors, one drawn from the town and three from the countryside.

=== Contemporary period ===
Between February 1798 and August 1799 Montefalco was under the rule of the Roman Republic, and on 9 August 1799 it was retaken by the Austro-Aretine army. From 1809 to 1814 it formed part of the French Empire, with the French withdrawing from Umbria at the end of January 1814.

Montefalco suffered greatly in the earthquake of 13 January 1832.

Administrative reorganization followed under Pope Pius VII, during which the castles of Fratta, San Luca and Fabbri were attached to Montefalco. In April 1848 Pope Pius IX granted Montefalco the title of city. From February to July 1849 it fell under the Roman Republic, before pontifical rule was restored on 28 July 1849 by Monsignor D'Andrea.

In the mid-19th century Montefalco is reported to have 4,033 inhabitants. Of these, 1,046 lived within the city and 2,987 in the surrounding countryside.

On 4–5 November 1860 a plebiscite was held for Umbria's annexation to the Kingdom of Italy, and on 17 December 1860 it was formally annexed to the Kingdom of Italy by royal decree.

Pope Leo XIV visited the frazione on 22 November 2025, to have mass and eat lunch with the cloistered nuns at the Augustinian monastery of Santa Chiara (Saint Clare of Montefalco of the Cross).

== Geography ==
Montefalco lies to the northwest of Spoleto, in an area of hills and plains on the west side of the Umbrian Valley and south of Bevagna.

Montefalco stands on the summit of a hill, with the Topino and the Maroggia running at its foot. Its horizon was described in the 19th century as so attractive that the town was called "the balcony of Umbria". In the surrounding countryside, the land rises in gentle slopes up to the city walls and is particularly rich in olive groves and orchards.

=== Subdivisions ===
The municipality includes the localities of Argentella, Belvedere, Borghetto, Camiano Grande, Camiano Piccolo, Casale, Cerrete, Colle Arfuso, Colle San Clemente, Cortignano, Fabbri, Fratta, Il Piano, Lasignano, Mercatello, Montefalco, Montepennino, Pietrauta, Poggetto, Rignano, San Luca, Turri, Turrita, Valle Cupa, Vecciano, Vigliano.

In 2021, 1,869 people lived in rural dispersed dwellings not assigned to any named locality. At the time, most of the population lived in Montefalco proper (1,258). The following localities had no recorded permanent residents: Convento San Fortunato, Gallo, Madonna della Stella.

== Economy ==
The territory of Montefalco is described in 19th century sources as very fertile, particularly in olives, the fruit of which is presented as one of the most abundant goods for export. Cereals and wine are also said to be plentiful.

=== Wine ===
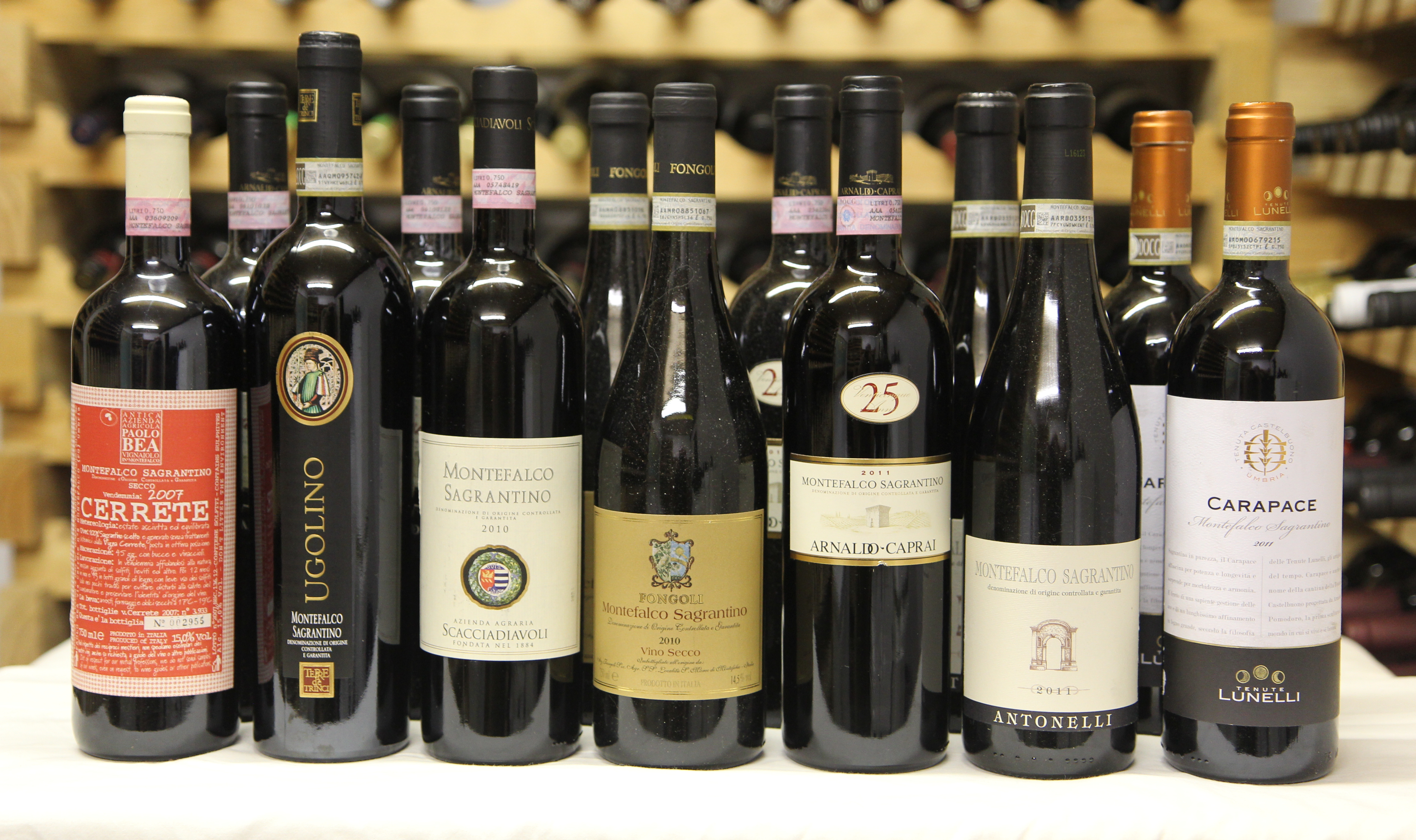
A selection of Montefalco Sagrantino wines

The comune of Montefalco and a small area of the comune of Bevagna constitute the regulated geographical area for Montefalco wines.

Montefalco is closely associated with Sagrantino, an ancient grape variety with traces dating back to the 1st century AD and cultivated almost exclusively within the municipality. Traditionally, Sagrantino was produced mainly as a passito wine; from the late 1970s and early 1980s, it also began to be vinified consistently as a dry red. In 1992, Sagrantino di Montefalco became the 12th Italian wine to obtain DOCG status.

Sagrantino produces a deep ruby-red wine with fruity and spicy aromas, a full structure, and pronounced tannins, and it is suitable for long ageing. In passito form it yields wines of high intensity and complexity, in which sweetness balances the grape's naturally firmer elements.

Every year around Easter, the town sponsors a major festival called Settimana Enologica — or Wine Week — where visitors can enjoy the principal wines produced in the area including the comparatively simple red table wine, Montefalco Rosso, the more complex DOCG red wines Sagrantino, for which the area is famous, and the Montefalco Sagrantino secco.

== Religion ==
=== Sant'Agostino ===
The church of Sant'Agostino was built at the beginning of the 14th century. Its entrance has a pointed arch decorated with sculptures and a foliage frieze on the jamb capitals. On the right side of the entrance the date 1327 is inscribed.

Inside, on the left wall, a fresco in a semicircular niche depicts the Virgin enthroned with Jesus, Saints James and John the Evangelist, and a landscape in the background; it is attributed to a Perugian school and dated 1522. On the high altar there is a surviving section of a tempera predella with Saints Lucia, Augustine, Leonard, Lawrence, Sebastian and Gregory the Great, from the 15th century. To the right, in the chapel beside the presbytery, a fresco shows God blessing with Mary and Jesus enthroned, with half figures of saints above and, below, Saints Leonard and Paul together with half figures of Saints Peter and Fortunato; it is attributed to the school of Benozzo Gozzoli.

The sacristy vault is decorated with 15th-century frescoes including Christ blessing, the four doctors of the Church, and eight half figures of saints. A tempera panel on the entry wall shows the Coronation of Mary and is described as an Umbrian-school work of the same century. Another panel on the right wall depicts Mary enthroned with Jesus and two angels in adoration, with Saints Peter and Paul, Sebastian and a holy monk, with a date of 1487.

=== San Francesco ===
The church of San Francesco dates to the 14th century, though the entrance was renewed in 1585 and is ornamented with pilasters and a Doric entablature. The interior has two naves. On the entrance wall at left, the first recess contains monochrome frescoes of the Annunciation, God blessing among angels, and the Nativity, attributed to Perugino. Further along the left wall, the second recess shows the Virgin enthroned with Jesus, Saint Bonaventure and Saint Andrew, with a landscape, and an inscription naming Tiberio d'Assisi as painter; the third recess contains, above, a Crucifixion with the Virgin and Saint John and, below, Saint Anthony of Padua and two miracles attributed to him, assigned to the school of Gozzoli; the fourth recess shows Mary seated with Jesus; and another work dated 1500 and attributed to a Perugian school.

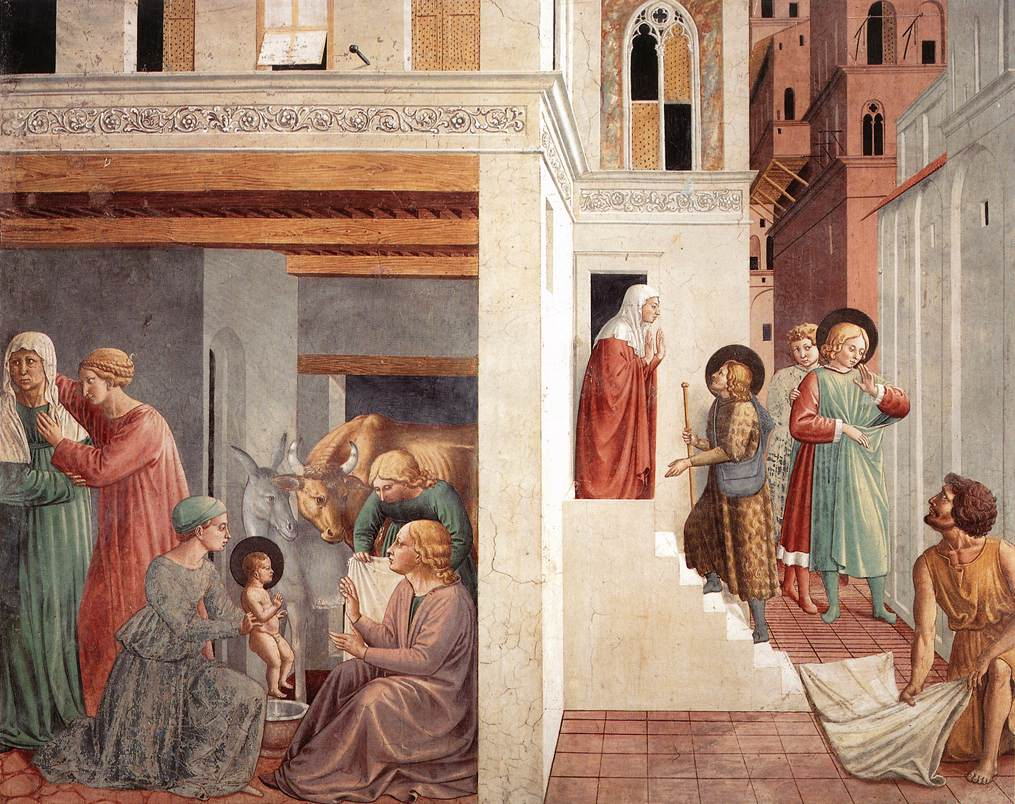
Benozzo Gozzoli, Scenes from the Life of St Francis

The apse is entirely covered with frescoes. The arch contains roundels with half figures of Saint Francis and his twelve companions. The vault includes figures of Saints Louis, Rose of Viterbo, Bernardine, Catherine and Anthony. The walls carry cycles from the life of Saint Francis in three registers, including scenes such as the birth of the saint, the gift of his cloak to the poor, the vision of banners and shields, Francis being vested by the bishop of Assisi, Mary interceding before Christ, the dream of Innocent III, and the receiving of the stigmata, the death of the saint, and others. Above these are roundels with popes, cardinals and doctors, and portraits identified as Dante, Petrarch and Giotto, as well as the emperor of Constantinople and Pope Nicholas IV. The fresco cycle is considered among the masterpieces of Benozzo Gozzoli.

On the right side of the presbytery is a chapel with frescoes attributed to a Giottesque school. In the right nave, fresco cycles include scenes from the life of Saint Anthony of Padua attributed to a school of Gubbio of the 15th century, and other works attributed to Umbrian schools of the 15th and 16th centuries. A shaped cross painted in tempera with the figure of Christ, with God blessing above and the Virgin and Saint John at the sides and Saint Francis below, is in the manner of Cimabue.

The sacristy contains a tempera painting on paper showing Jesus supporting the cross, attributed to Lo Spagna but described as entirely repainted.

=== Santa Illuminata ===
At the entrance of the church of Santa Illuminata the date 1308 is recorded, and the lunette contains a fresco of the Virgin between two nuns with devotees below, described as a work of the 16th century. Inside, one niche shows Mary with Jesus enthroned and various saints in the manner of Tiberio d'Assisi; another includes a Glory of Angels, Saint Martin, the Flight into Egypt, the Nativity, the Epiphany and Saint Anthony, attributed to a Perugian school; another contains Christ risen with Saints Sebastian, Lawrence, Jerome and Anthony, dated 1515 and attributed to Francesco Melanzio; another includes the Coronation of the Virgin, Mary among seraphim, and saints including Agatha, Augustine, Gregory and Lucia; frescoes in a further niche are said to recall the manner of Lo Spagna.

=== San Bartolomeo ===
In the church of San Bartolomeo, on the exterior near the apse are remains of an earlier doorway with symbolic ornaments, built in the 11th century. In the sacristy there is a tempera panel on a gold ground, attributed to Lo Spagna, depicting Saints Vincent (deacon), Illuminata and Nicholas of Tolentino.

=== Church and convent of San Fortunato ===
The church is entered through a cloister whose portico has four ancient columns. On the left is the chapel of Saint Francis, decorated with frescoes by Tiberio d'Assisi dated 1512, including saints and episodes from the life of Saint Francis such as the saint in the rose garden, the concession of pardon, and the approval of an indulgence; the vault has Christ blessing at the center.

On the façade, above the entrance, a lunette contains a fresco of Mary with Jesus, Saint Francis and Saint Bernardine, and above the archivolt are seven angels attributed to Benozzo Gozzoli. To the right of the entrance is the tombstone of Pompilio de Cuppis, a renowned physician who died in 1559.

Inside, the right wall of the apse preserves remains of frescoes including the Virgin holding the Redeemer on her knees and a kneeling angel; an inscription "Benoti de Florentia" is accompanied by the date 1450. In the sacristy there is a tempera panel by the same master showing the Crucifixion with the Virgin, Saint John, Mary Magdalene and Saint Francis.

San Fortunato is also noted for a panel painting by Fra Angelico.

=== Monastery of Santa Croce ===
Outside the city walls is the monastery of Santa Croce, founded by the Blessed Giovanna. The body of her sister, Saint Clare of Montefalco, born in the town, is venerated there, together with her disciples the Blessed Illuminata and the Blessed Chiaretta. Her body is said to remain incorrupt and flexible and bear signs impressed on the heart of the Passion of Jesus, along with three small balls as a symbol of the Holy Trinity.

Saint Clare was born in 1272. Her sister Giovanna, with offerings from devoted citizens, built the monastery on a high hill under the Order of Saint Augustine, and Clare went to seek alms for this purpose. A popular solemn feast is held on 18 August, the anniversary of Saint Claire's death.

=== Other religious buildings ===
In the church of San Leonardo, the main-altar tempera painting depicts Jesus with Mary and a group of saints including Leonard, John the Baptist, Barbara, Anthony, Jerome, John the Evangelist, Sebastian, Louis, Clare and Francis. An inscription gives the painter as Francesco Melanzio and the date 7 September 1515.

In the church of Santa Ilaria di Piazza, behind the altar a niche contains a fresco showing God blessing amid a glory of seraphim and, below, the Virgin with Jesus and angels together with Saint Fortunato; it is attributed to Melanzio of Montefalco.

At the church of the Madonna di Vecciano, a niche at the altar wall is decorated with frescoes depicting the Virgin with Jesus enthroned; in the arch is an emblem of the Baptist, and figures of Saints Peter, Francis, John the Baptist and Sebastian. The work is attributed to Tiberio d'Assisi.

The church of Turrita has an apse and side entrance said to date to the 12th century. Inside, in the apse, there is a fresco of Calvary from the 14th century.

== Culture ==
=== Palazzo Comunale ===
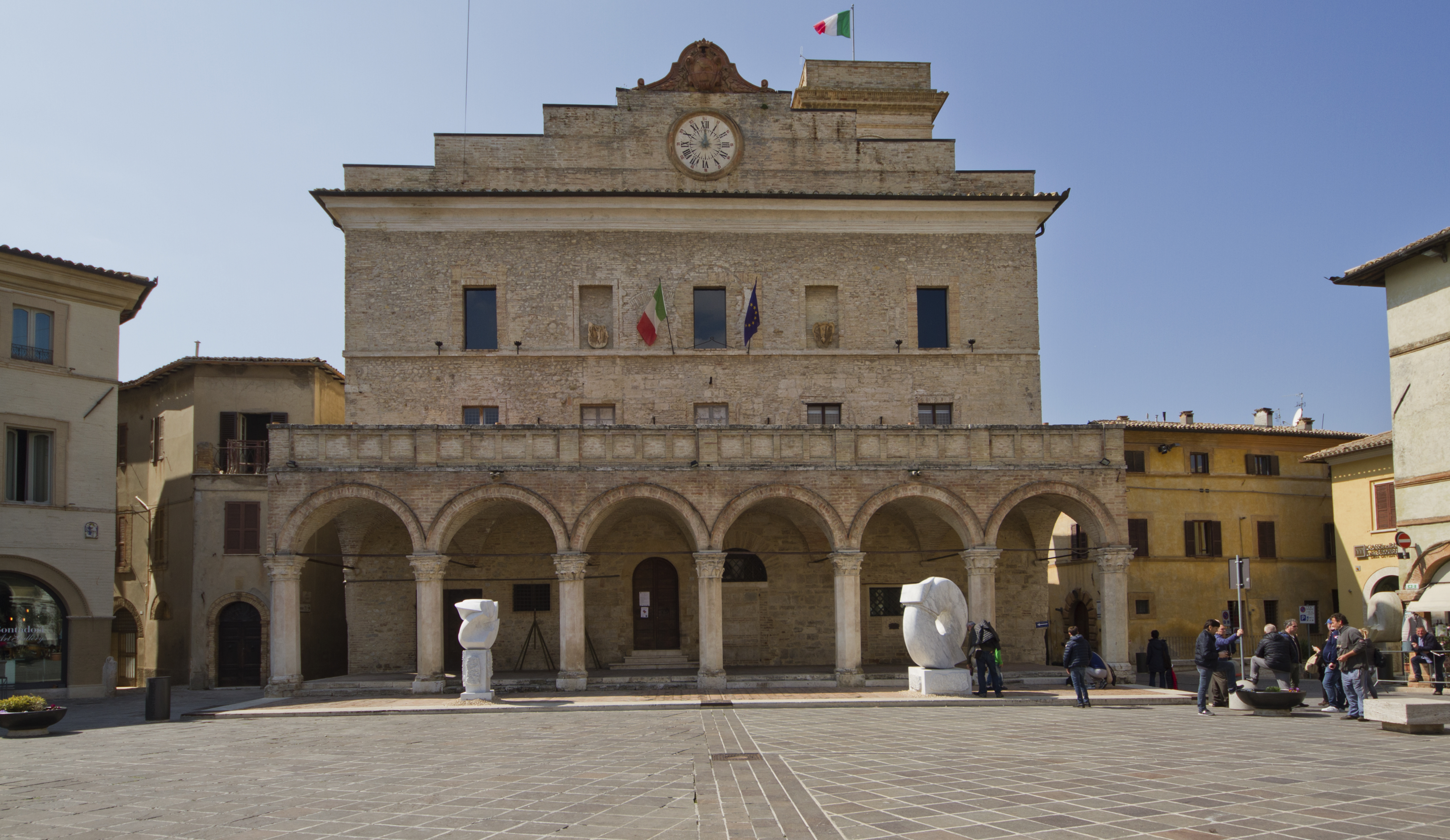
Palazzo Comunale

The Palazzo Comunale, historically known as the Palazzo del Popolo, was built in 1270 and was later enlarged along its entire left side during the 15th century. The expansion included a portico with octagonal pillars finished with capitals carved with broad acanthus leaves; above the Renaissance loggia is a large terrace overlooking the square. The façade preserves a notable element of the 13th-century building in the form of an elegant bifora with a twisted little column. Above the municipal palace rises the bell tower.

On the first floor the building houses the municipal librarys. In the second room of the library there is a fresco of the Madonna in Maestà, attributed to Giovanni di Corraduccio. The current council chamber on the top floor previously served, in the 18th century, as the Teatro dell'Aquila, which remained active until the end of the 19th century.

The municipal picture gallery is formed largely of works from local churches and includes paintings and frescoes attributed to Giannicola, Francesco Melanzio, Niccolò da Foligno’s school, Benozzo Gozzoli, and Tiberio d'Assisi; it also includes an ivory crucifix described as Flemish in style and dated to the 17th century.

== Notable people ==
Saint Clare of Montefalco was born in Montefalco in 1272.

Among other religious figures from the town are Saints Fortunatus and Severo; the blessed Bartolomea; the blessed Illuminata and Chiarella, whose bodies are preserved in the church of Sant'Agostino; the blessed Giovanna, said to have founded in the 13th century a conservatory for abandoned people; and the blessed Anselmo, described as vicar general of Innocent VIII.

Others include Antonio Bennati, a jurist; Bonifacio de Cuppis, associated with Emperor Wenceslaus; Ottavio and Pergentile Senili, described respectively as a senator of Rome under Julius II and as a nuncio of Sixtus IV to Matthias Corvinus, king of Hungary; Francesco Maria Passeri, a jurist; Pietro Montefalchio, an archaeologist; Sante Sanzio and Achille Egidi, physicians, with Achille Egidi also credited as author of the Latin poem Clareide dedicated to Urban VIII and printed at Lyon in 1631; Nicolò da Montefalco, a poet; and Francesco Melanzio, a painter and pupil of Perugino.

Among military figures are Benenato Corcorone, a knight of Frederick II; Gianlucido Benenato, a captain who served Francesco I and Clement VII and later the princes of Savoy; and Lucantonio Coppi, listed among the defenders of Rome at the time of the Sack by the Constable of Bourbon.
