= Cannara =

- Comune
- Comune di Cannara
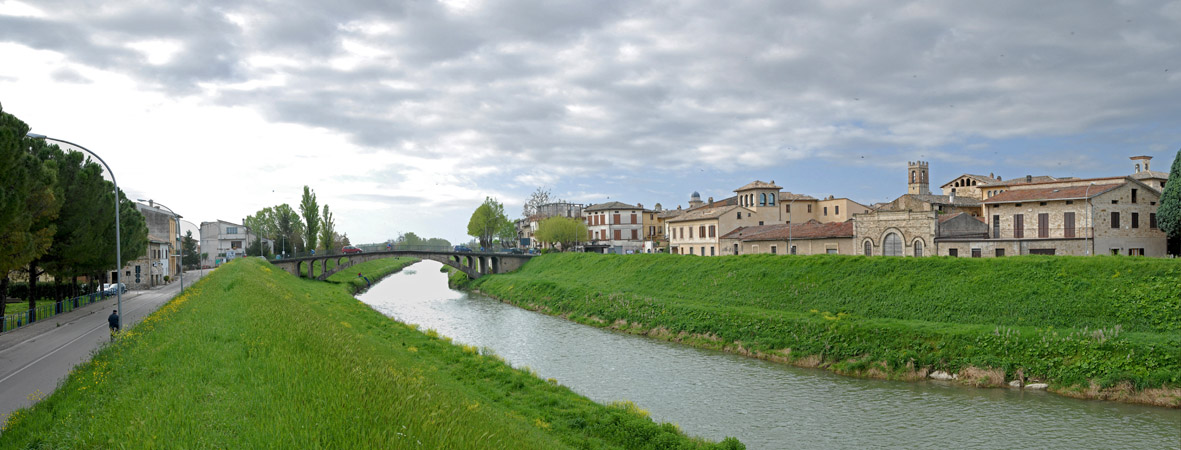
- Cannara

- Coat of arms

- Location within Italy Location within Umbria
- Coordinates: 42.995098°N 12.582716°E
- Country: Italy
- Region: Umbria
- Province: Perugia

Government
  - Mayor: Fabrizio Gareggia

Area
  - Total: 32 km^{2} (12 sq mi)
- Elevation: 197 m (646 ft)

Population (1 January 2025)
  - Total: 4,155
  - Density: 130/km^{2} (340/sq mi)
- Demonym: Cannaresi
- Time zone: UTC+1 (CET)
  - Summer (DST): UTC+2 (CEST)
- Postal code: 06033
- Dialing code: 0742
- Patron saint: St. Matthew
- Saint day: September 21
- Website: Official website

Cannara is a town and comune on the Topino River in the floodplain of central Umbria, in the province of Perugia. It is located about 7 km west of Spello and 9 km north of Bevagna.

== Etymology ==
Cannara was formerly known as Villa Portella, then Carnerio, a name connected to Count Raniero, as it was believed to have been founded by a Perugian lord of the Ranieri family in the time of Frederick Barbarossa.

Owing to the abundance of reeds (canne) growing in the surrounding area, it later took the name Cannaria, which subsequently became Cannara.

== History ==
As indicated by the etymology of the name, it is a medieval town, recent by the standards of the region, since in earlier times the site was underwater in the Lacus Clitorius that covered much of the area between Bastia Umbra and Foligno, and was only drained in the Middle Ages. At any rate Cannara is first mentioned in 1170 as insula Cannaio — "the island of Cannaio"; the lake had not been completely drained yet.

The origins of the settlement are linked to the destruction of the Roman city of Urvinum Hortense in 545 by Totila, after which the surrounding plain was gradually reclaimed.

Control passed in 1212 to Count Napoleone Trinci. During the 13th century disputes arose with Assisi over border territories, conflicts that continued in the following centuries. Submission to Perugia in 1377 led to repeated alignment with that city in opposition to Assisi.

The town was occupied in 1387 by the Michelotti exiles of Perugia, prompting the inhabitants to flee to Perugia. In 1416 it followed the fortunes of Perugia under Braccio Fortebraccio.

During the 15th century lordship was granted to Malatesta Baglioni. In 1515 the municipality purchased reclaimed marshlands that had previously been seized by the Baglioni. Urban improvements were carried out in the 16th century under Costanza Baglioni.

The death of Malatesta V in 1648 marked the end of Baglioni rule; the lands passed to the Holy See after prior acquisition by the Ughi family of Florence. In the late 17th century the town was placed under a governor resident in Perugia.

French troops looted and burned the settlement in 1797. Two years later, in 1799, it was included in the Department of Trasimeno under a provisional government based in Perugia.

Following the French period and the Roman Republic, the early 19th century saw restoration to papal rule, accompanied by tensions with the papal administration. In 1816 it was recognized as a governor's seat in the district of Foligno, with Limigiano and Castelbuono subject to it. The following year it was joined to Bevagna within the district of Spoleto, with dependent hamlets including Collemancio, Sant'Angelo, San Giovanni, Manciano and San Salvatore. A further administrative reform in 1827 reduced it to a mayoral jurisdiction in the district of Foligno, with Collemancio as its only dependent hamlet.

The town suffered considerable damage during the earthquake of 1832. In the mid-19th century Cannara had a population of 1,873 inhabitants, of whom 905 lived in the town and 968 in the surrounding countryside.

In November 1860 Umbria was incorporated into the Kingdom of Sardinia. After Italian unification, the settlement was elevated to the rank of municipality within the Kingdom of Italy.

== Geography ==
Cannara lies in the Umbrian Valley at an elevation of 197 metres (646 ft), about 8 kilometres (5.0 mi) from Spello, on the left bank of the Topino river. The locality is described as low-lying and formerly marshy.

The surrounding territory is fertile and densely dotted with rural houses. The soil is described as clayey and black earth. The Topino flows slowly across much of the area, as do smaller streams known as Saone and Ose.

The area also contains mineral waters, including a ferruginous spring about 0.5 miles (0.80 km) away in the locality of Belvedere along the road to the Capuchin convent, and a sulphurous spring in the locality known as Via Nuova.

=== Subdivisions ===
The municipality includes the localities of Cannara proper, Case Barbetta, Case Brilli, Collemancio, I Cappuccini, Stradone.

In 2021, 1,197 people lived in rural dispersed dwellings not assigned to any named locality. At the time, most of the population lived in Cannara proper (2,829).

== Economy ==
In the 19th century the inhabitants were described as industrious and engaged in commerce, aided by road connections to nearby towns. Local production included earthenware and spirits, while trade involved hay, silkworm cocoons, fish, onions, shoe lasts, hemp, flax, and mulberry cultivation.

Agriculture and pastoral activity were particularly active. The territory produced a variety of goods, though fruit cultivation was limited, with a predominance of maples, elms, and vines.

Cannara is still described as a low-key agricultural village: its main business is the growing of wheat and onions. Its railroad station is used for freight and does not serve passengers.

== Religion and culture ==
=== San Biagio ===
The earliest record of the Church of San Biagio dates to a document of 1244 in which the monks of San Benedetto del Subasio included it among their possessions. The façade remains that of the late Gothic structure built of white and pink stone blocks arranged in alternating rows. On the high altar, to the left of the entrance, there is a late 16th-century painting depicting the Trinity; to the right are Saints Lawrence and Benedict, and to the left Saint Blaise and Blessed Lawrence Justinian.

=== Edicola of Pian d'Arca ===
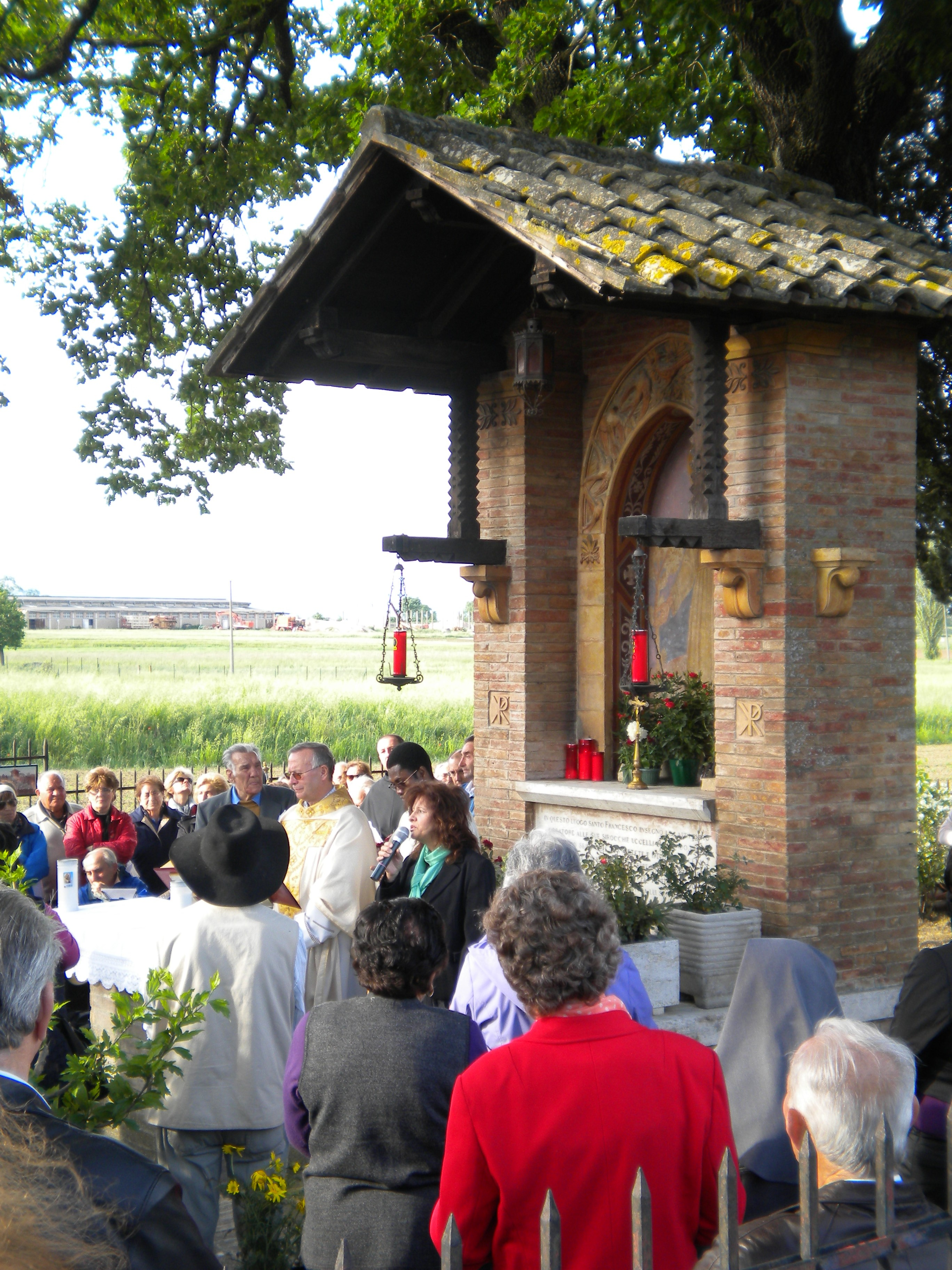
Edicola of Pian d'Arca

The shrine at Pian d'Arca was erected in 1926 on the occasion of the 700th anniversary of the death of Saint Francis. It stands at the place where the stone was located on which the saint is believed to have stood during the Sermon to the Birds, delivered between 1212 and 1213.

The structure, protected by a low wall, contains a fresco of Saint Francis speaking with the birds and, below it, a marble slab with an inscription recalling the event. Beyond a gate, several steps descend to a small altar. A path begins at this site which, according to tradition, corresponds to the route taken by Saint Francis when, after preaching at Cannara, he went toward Bevagna and encountered a large number of birds to which he addressed his sermon.

=== Other religious buildings ===
Among the principal religious buildings is the church of San Matteo, which contains works dating from the 14th and 16th centuries, including a tempera painting with the Virgin, Christ, Saint Francis and Saint Matthew, attributed to the Umbrian school.

The church of San Giovanni Battista houses a notable tempera altarpiece depicting the Virgin with Christ, Saint John and Saint Sebastian, attributed to Niccolò Alunno, as well as a 15th-century embossed copper processional cross preserved in the sacristy.

About 1 mile (1.6 km) from the town stood the Capuchin convent, with a walled garden and a church containing three altars.

=== Urvinum Hortense ===
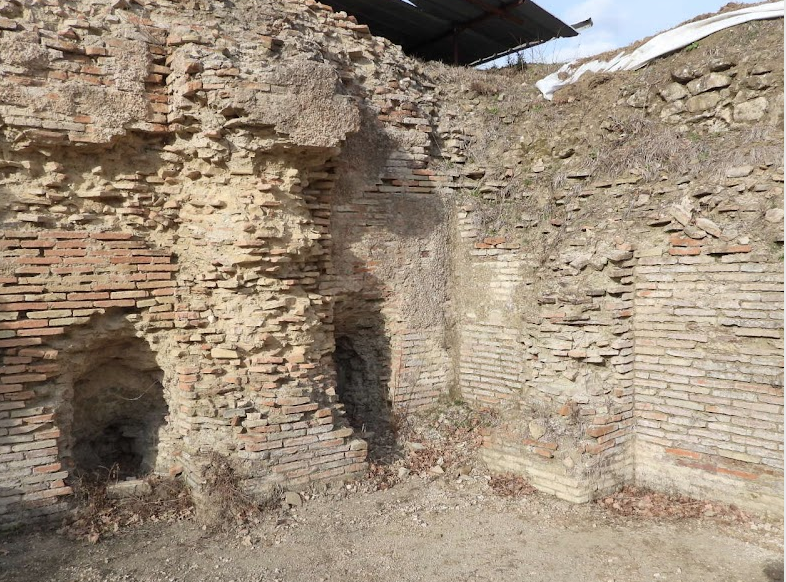
Masonry wall with brick arches and recessed openings at Urvinum Hortense

Urvinum Hortense is located a few hundred meters northeast of the village of Collemancio, at 506 metres (1,660 ft) above sea level, within the territory of the municipality of Cannara. The ancient settlement formed part of the Augustan Regio VI, with its inhabitants enrolled in the Stellatina tribe.

The site developed as a small planned settlement during the 2nd century BC and became a Roman municipium in 90 BC. Archaeological remains include parts of a surrounding wall visible on the western side of the plateau and an urban layout organized along a road connecting Urvinum Hortense with Mevania and Vettona. Along this paved route stood a temple whose rectangular podium, measuring 23.8 metres (78 ft) by 17.8 metres (58 ft), remains visible. The building dates to the 2nd century BC. With the abandonment of the settlement in the Early Middle Ages, between the 6th and 9th centuries, a parish church known as Santa Maria de Orbinum was built on the site using materials taken from the temple.

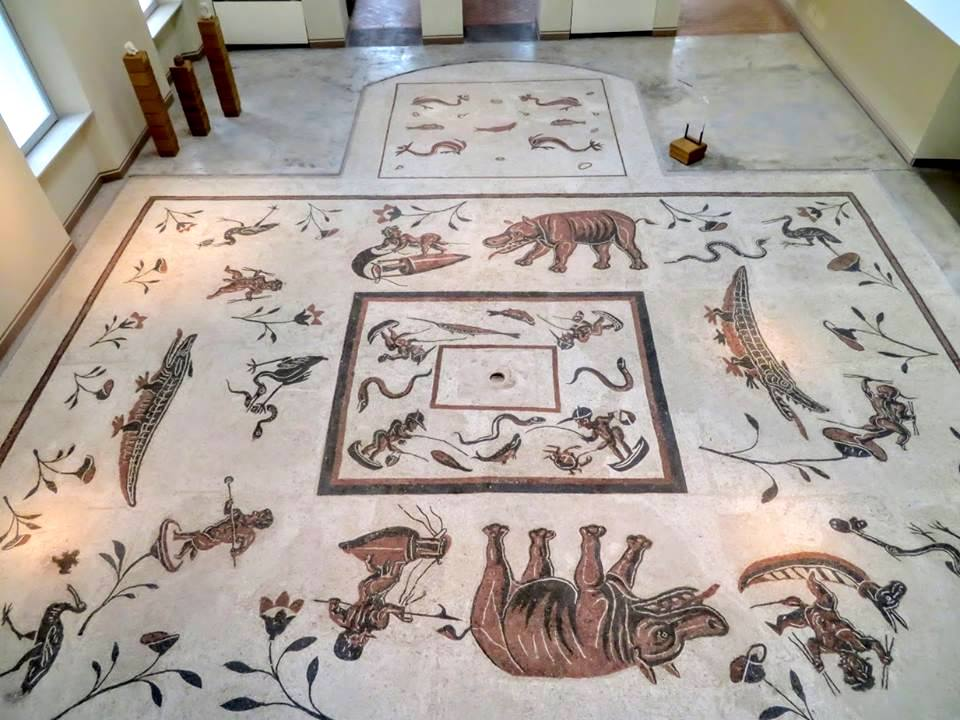
Mosaic floor with animal figures and hunting imagery

In the northern sector are the remains of a large cistern and a bath complex extending over more than 400 square metres (4,300 sq ft), from which came a polychrome mosaic pavement with Nilotic scenes.

Archaeological excavations have been conducted at Urvinum Hortense since 1995. Finds from the site are also displayed in the Antiquarium of Collemancio and in the Museo della Città e del Territorio di Cannara, opened in 2008, which illustrates the history of the territory from its origins through the Early Middle Ages and into the modern period.

=== Other cultural heritage ===
The town also featured a theatre with 22 boxes and hosted philharmonic and amateur dramatic societies.

=== Events ===
Cannara hosts the yearly sagra "Festa della Cipolla", a long-running event focused on onions, with dishes such as onion pizza and other onion dishes. As of 2025, the fest has been held for over forty years, with around 30,000 people in attendance over one weekend.

== Notable people ==
Cannara was the birthplace of the Blessed Lucio Modestini, the first to profess the Rule of the Third Order instituted by Saint Francis, and of Tano Tani, a Guelph captain who defeated Alberghetto dei Chiavelli and died in 1347 fighting against the Ghibellines. Ettore Thesorieri authored Roma insensata, published in 1626.

Among the principal families recorded in the 19th century were the Majolica (later Pesci-Majolica), the Brunamonti, and the Tani.
