= Urbinum =

Urbinum (ancient Latin placename, meaning "small town") may refer to:

- Urbinum Hortense, a town of ancient Italy, site unknown
- Urbinum Mataurense, on the Metauro River, usually stated to be the modern Urbino, although sometimes the modern Urbania
