= Spacca =

Spacca is an Italian surname. Notable people with the surname include:

- Ascensidonio Spacca (c. 1557–1646), Italian painter
- Gian Mario Spacca (born 1953), Italian politician
- Maria Enrica Spacca (born 1986), Italian sprinter
