= Gaglioli =

- Frazione
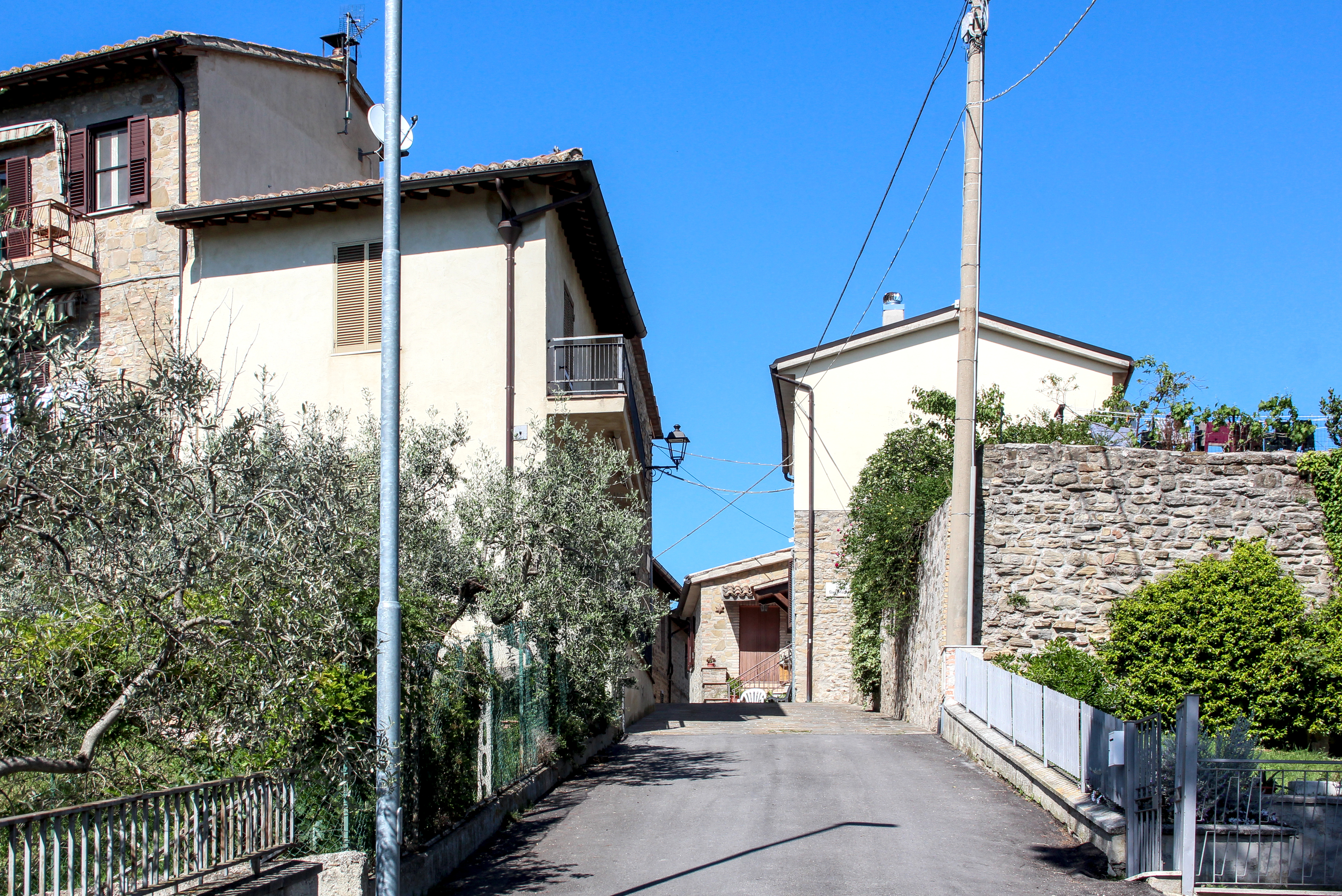
- Gaglioli

- Location within Italy
- Coordinates: 42°54′36″N 12°34′52″E
- Country: Italy
- Region: Umbria
- Province: Perugia
- Comune: Bevagna
- Elevation: 347 m (1,138 ft)

Population (2001)
  - Total: 28
- Time zone: UTC+1 (CET)
  - Summer (DST): UTC+2 (CEST)
- Postcode: 06031
- Area code: 0742

Gaglioli is a frazione of the comune of Bevagna in the Province of Perugia, Umbria, central Italy. It stands at an elevation of 347 metres above sea level. At the time of the Istat census of 2001 it had 28 inhabitants.
