= Collemancio =

- Frazione
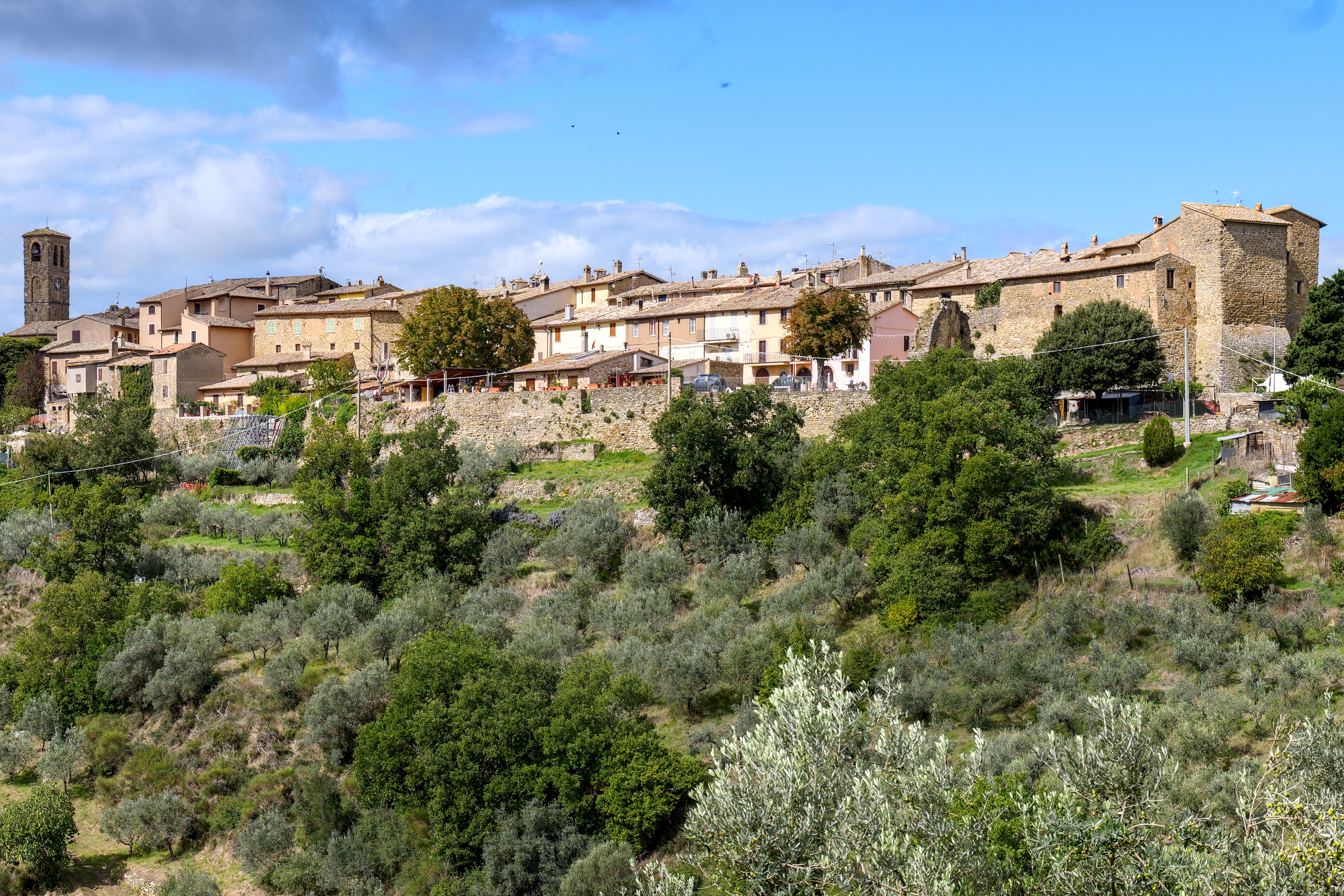
- Collemancio

- Location within Italy
- Coordinates: 42°58′59″N 12°31′23″E
- Country: Italy
- Region: Umbria
- Province: Perugia
- Comune: Cannara
- Elevation: 507 m (1,663 ft)

Population (2021)
  - Total: 65
- Time zone: UTC+1 (CET)
  - Summer (DST): UTC+2 (CEST)
- Postcode: 06033
- Area code: 0742

Collemancio is a frazione of the comune of Cannara in the Province of Perugia, Umbria, central Italy. It stands at an elevation of 507 metres (1,663 ft) above sea level. As of 2021, it had a population of 65 inhabitants. (Note: To obtain the data from the website: 1. Select "Basi Territoriali 2021: Confini amministrativi, Località, Sezioni di censimento, Aree SubCom".; 2. Use the search function to find the desired place.; 3. Click the Attribute Table icon in the top-right corner.; 4. In the panel that appears at the bottom of the page, select "Località 2021".)

== History ==
Collemancio, also known historically as Collemaggio, derives from the ancient Umbrian municipality of Urvinum Hortense, mentioned by Pliny the Elder. Significant ruins of the ancient settlement remain in the surrounding area, along with inscriptions and other archaeological finds discovered at various times.

Ancient Urvinum Hortense was the birthplace of Proculus, a proconsul in Spain, and of Valerius, known as a gladiator and performer, both attested by inscriptions.

The ancient city was destroyed by the Goths, and its population was reportedly reduced by plague. The modern settlement arose later.

The origins of Collemancio date to before the year 1000. It is first mentioned in written sources in 1224, when Pope Honorius III granted temporal jurisdiction over Collismanci to the bishop of Assisi. By 1293, Collemancio is attested as a comune. In 1377, it submitted to Perugia. In 1435, it was granted to Malatesta IV Baglioni. By 1648, Collemancio had been fully incorporated into the territories of the Papal States.

In 1862, Collemancio had a population of 497 inhabitants. By royal decree of 2 May 1869, the municipality was suppressed. Its entire territory was transferred to the municipality of Cannara.

== Geography ==
Collemancio covers an area of 1,864 hectares (4,610 acres). Its territory extends mostly across hills and mountains, with only a very small portion of plain land, which is bordered by the Topino River. It is a small hilltop village in a picturesque position, about 19 kilometres (12 mi) from Foligno. The settlement retains part of its enclosing walls.

== Economy ==
In the mid-19th century, the principal products of the territory included acorns, high-quality olive oil, firewood, and charcoal. Grain was cultivated, and there were pasture lands. Goat's milk products, particularly ricotta, were noted locally.

== Religion ==
There are several small churches in the territory, though most were described as being of limited artistic or historical significance. The suburban church of Santa Maria del Latte contains ancient frescoes. Near the Sambro stream stand the ruins of a former Benedictine monastery.

== See also ==
- Urvinum Hortense
