= Bevagna =

- Comune
- Comune di Bevagna
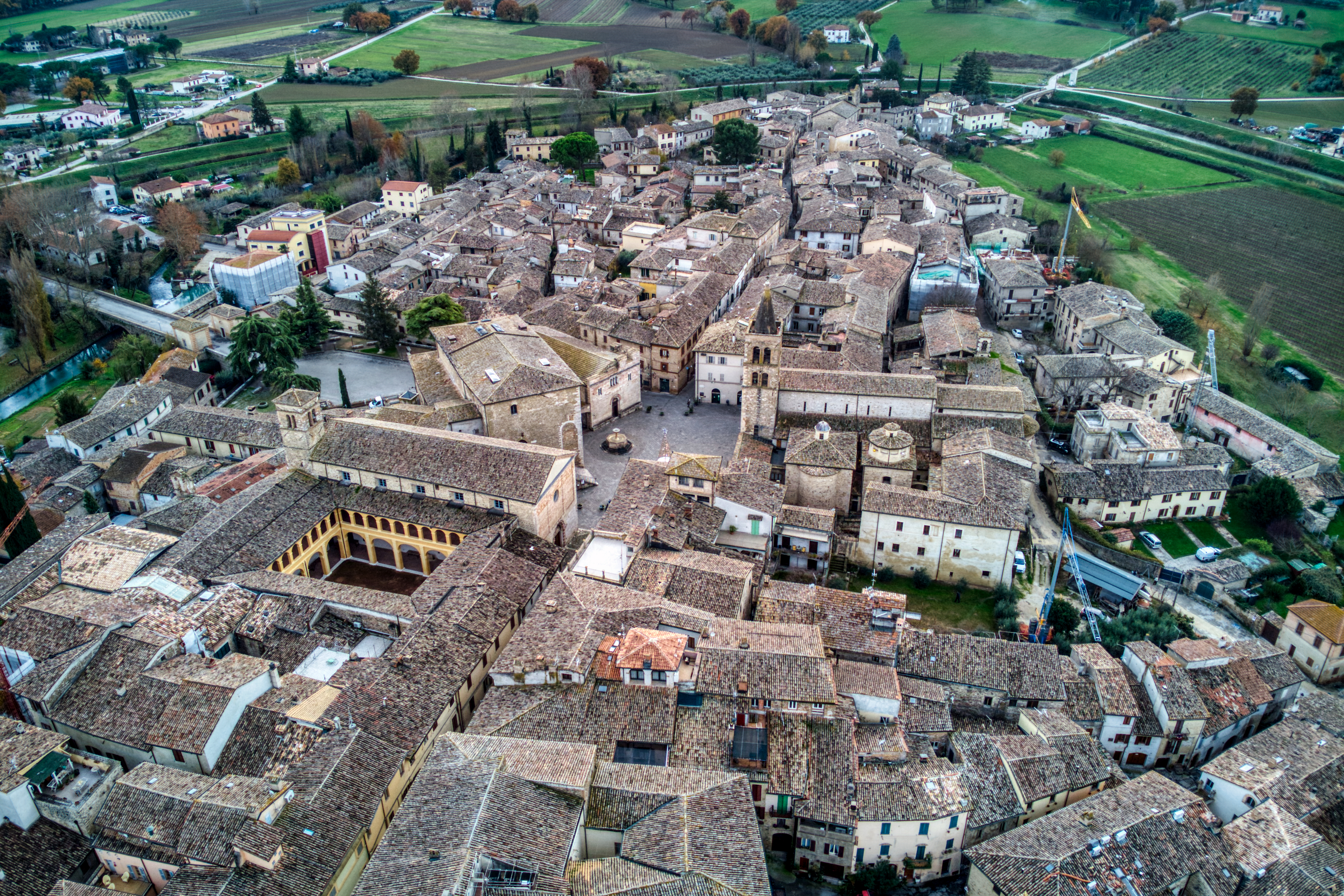
- View of Bevagna

- Coat of arms

- Location within Italy Location within Umbria
- Coordinates: 42.933878°N 12.609063°E
- Country: Italy
- Region: Umbria
- Province: Perugia

Government
  - Mayor: Annarita Falsacappa

Area
  - Total: 56.22 km^{2} (21.71 sq mi)
- Elevation: 210 m (690 ft)

Population (1 January 2025)
  - Total: 4,747
  - Density: 84.44/km^{2} (218.7/sq mi)
- Demonym: Bevanati
- Time zone: UTC+1 (CET)
  - Summer (DST): UTC+2 (CEST)
- Postal code: 06031
- Dialing code: 0742
- Patron saint: Saint Vincent
- Saint day: June 6
- Website: Official website

Bevagna is a town and comune in the central part of the Italian province of Perugia (Umbria), in the flood plain of the Topino river.

Bevagna is 25 km (16 mi) south-east of Perugia, 8 km (5.0 mi) west of Foligno, 7 km (4.3 mi) north-north-west of Montefalco, 16 km (9.9 mi) south of Assisi and 15 km (9.3 mi) north-west of Trevi.

Bevagna is one of I Borghi più belli d'Italia ("The most beautiful villages of Italy").

== History ==
=== Antiquity ===
Bevagna, known in antiquity as Mevania, was an important Umbrian city on the Via Flaminia, between Carsulae and Fulginium. The ancient settlement lay on the bank of the river Timia in an open and fertile valley stretching from the vicinity of Spoleto to the Tiber, separating the main Apennine chain from the ranges that extend toward Todi and Amelia. Classical authors including Columella, Silius Italicus and Lucan refer to the fertility of this region.

Before the Roman conquest, Mevania was a significant centre; in 308 BC Umbrian forces were stationed here when the consul Fabius advanced against them. In the Roman imperial period the city continued to flourish: Strabo mentions it among the strongest Umbrian cities, and Pliny records that it was enclosed by brick walls. The Antonine Itinerary and the Itinerary of Vicarello list Mevania as a mansio (station) on the Via Flaminia. Pliny also notes that the territory, the Mevanias ager, produced a particular prized wine called Irtia. Inscriptions indicate that the city belonged to the tribus Aemilia and that its municipal magistracies included quattuorviri.

The Clitunno was regarded as a major feature of the ancient city: it is described as extremely abundant in water and navigable with boats in two tiers. Near the confluence of the Topino with the Clitunno there was a kind of harbor, also mentioned in the Acts of Saint Vincent the Martyr, the patron of Bevagna, in connection with his attempted drowning at the harbour of Mevania.

=== Middle Ages ===
In the 6th century the city suffered serious damage during barbarian incursions.

After the 11th century Bevagna became a free municipality with a self-governing system headed by consuls. In 1249 Pope Innocent IV granted the community the right to choose its chief magistrate. In November of the same year, in the context of Frederick II's claim to the Duchy of Spoleto, Bevagna was besieged by the imperial vicar Thomas I of Aquino, Count of Acerra, and the city was badly damaged.

The city later rose again through the efforts attributed to the Blessed Giacomo of Bevagna, who rallied the dispersed inhabitants and encouraged the rebuilding of the walls on a more modest scale, sufficient to protect the families who had returned.

Between 1371 and 1439 Bevagna was under the lordship of the Trinci family of Foligno. In 1439 Cardinal Giovanni Vitelleschi returned the territory to the direct rule of the Holy See.

=== Early Modern period ===
From 1503 to 1519 Bevagna was under the government of Perugia, and in 1519 governance passed to a succession of lifetime governors appointed directly by the Holy See.

From 1562 to 1566 Bevagna was under the authority of the governor of Spoleto, Cardinal Charles Borromeo. In 1567 Pope Pius V placed it under the immediate authority of the Holy See and appointed Cardinal Ferdinando de' Medici as lifetime governor.

=== Contemporary era ===
On 10 May 1798, under the territorial-division law of the Roman Republic, Bevagna was assigned to the Canton of Spello in the Department of Clitunno. In early August 1799 Neapolitan troops ended the republic. On 8 August 1799 Liberato Giorgi was named governor.

During the period of the French Empire, Bevagna was assigned to the district of Foligno in the Department of Trasimeno. On 14 May 1814 the Papal government was restored, with Liberato Giorgi, Filippo Angeli Nieri, and Cortese Bartoli acting as provisional regents, while Sandro Oleandri, a lawyer, served as provisional governor.

In 1825 Pope Leo XII granted Bevagna the title of city. The town was damaged by earthquakes in 1832.

In the mid-19th century the town had 4,024 inhabitants. Of these, 2,087 lived within the built-up area and 1,937 in the rural district. In 1860 Bevagna joined the Kingdom of Italy, within the Province of Umbria.

== Geography ==
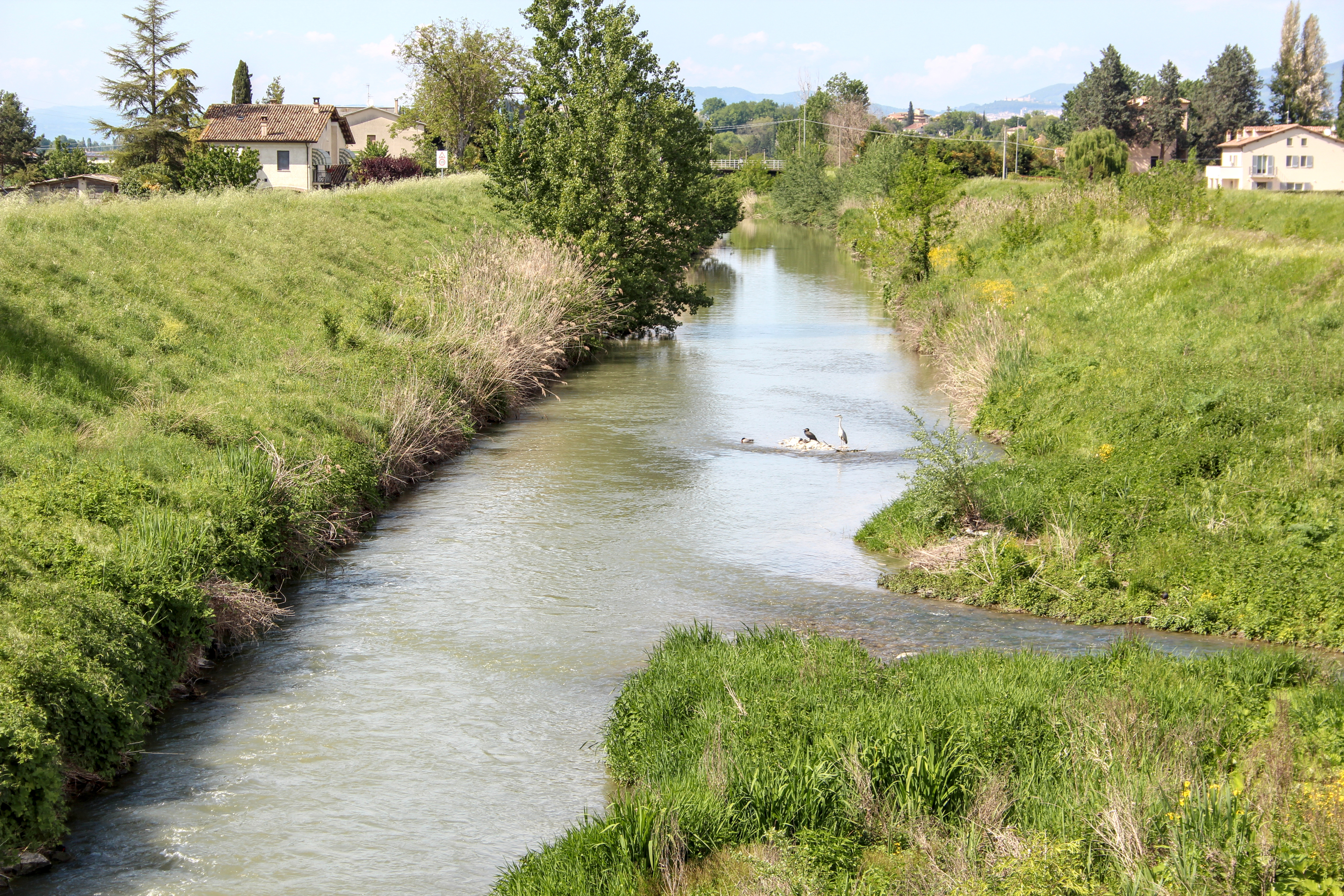
The Timia river east of Bevagna

Bevagna lies in the western part of the Umbrian Valley on a plain at 225 metres (738 ft) above sea level, with hills to the west. The territory is described as well cultivated, and agriculture benefits from the waters of the Timia, increased by those of the Attone stream. In the northern plain there is a small lake called the Cantone; because of its depth it is also known as the Abisso.

Bevagna is located near the confluence of the Maroggia with the Topino, from which it is less than 1 mile (1.6 km). The Clitunno runs close to the town's ancient walls. The town is on flat ground, and lies southwest of Foligno at a distance of 5 miles (8.0 km).

Its territory includes a wooded area called il Monte and hills overlooking the Umbrian Valley.

=== Subdivisions ===
The municipality includes the localities of Bevagna, Campofondo, Cantalupo, Castelbuono, Gaglioli, Limigiano, Madonna della Pia, Torre del Colle.

In 2021, 1,606 people lived in rural dispersed dwellings not assigned to any named locality. At the time, most of the population lived in Bevagna proper (2,651).

== Economy ==
In the 19th century the territory of Bevagna was said to produce abundant cereals and vines, yielding a wine described as renowned, while the hills were noted for flourishing olive groves. Flax was widely sown, and hemp was also cultivated. Hemp cloth was reportedly a major local manufacture, though it had already declined by the late 19th century. Bevagna formerly had considerable trade in table linen. Bevagna also had a printing establishment in the 17th century.

== Religion ==
=== San Michele Arcangelo ===
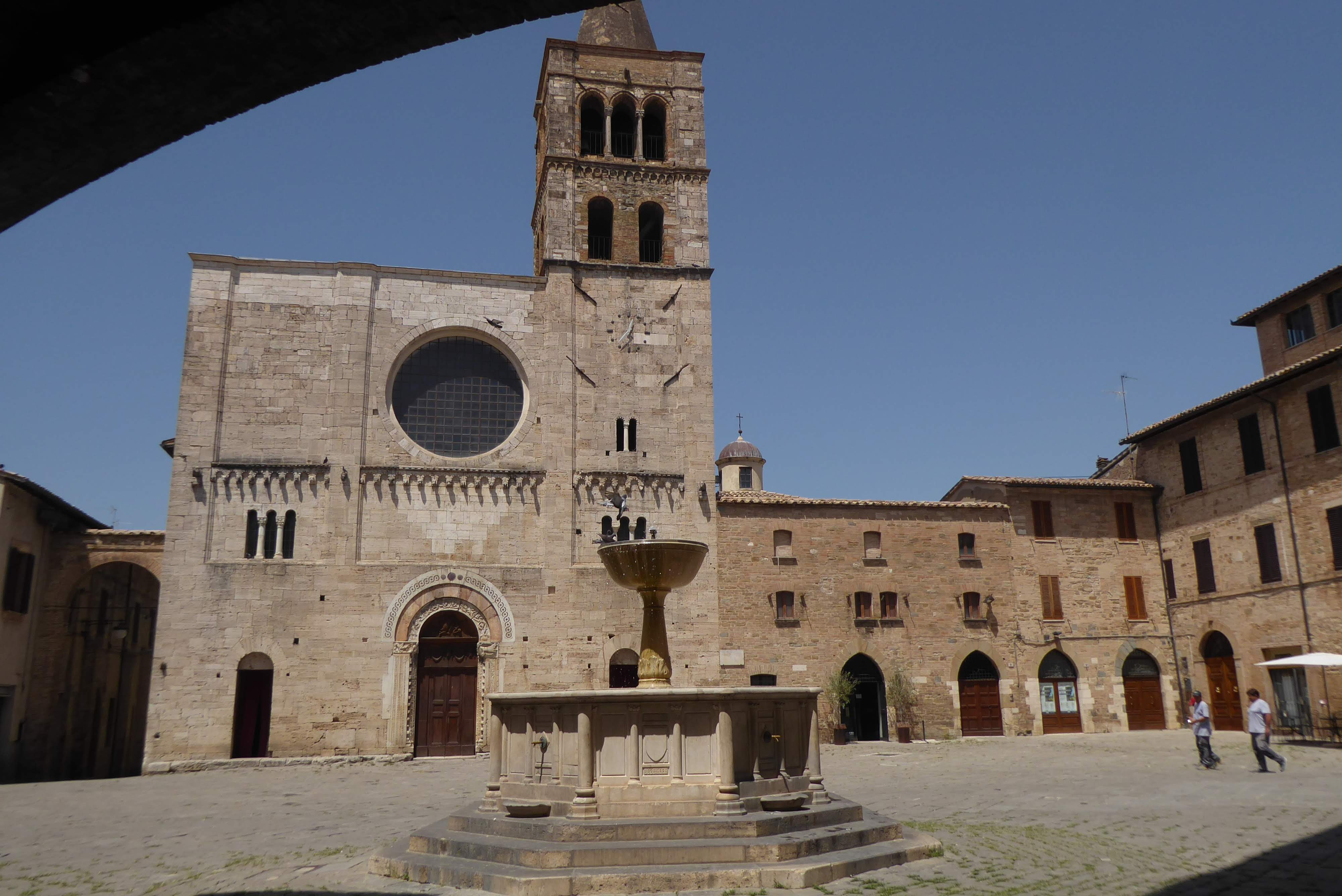
The church of San Michele Arcangelo

The church of San Michele Arcangelo was the city's first cathedral and later became a collegiate church, which was abolished by Frederick II in 1248 and restored only in 1620 at the will of Pope Paul V.

Over the centuries the building underwent numerous alterations. In the 15th century its roof was restored, and in the 17th century both the interior and the façade were adapted to Baroque taste. During that phase a new rose window was opened by demolishing the original and part of the corbel table with its small arches; the interiors of both the church and the crypt were entirely covered with stuccoes and with vaulting in camorcanna. The bell tower, built at the end of the 12th century, was modified in its upper part using reused elements from the preceding bell tower. Between 1951 and 1957 the church was returned to its earlier forms through the removal of Baroque interventions and the reconstruction of missing parts.

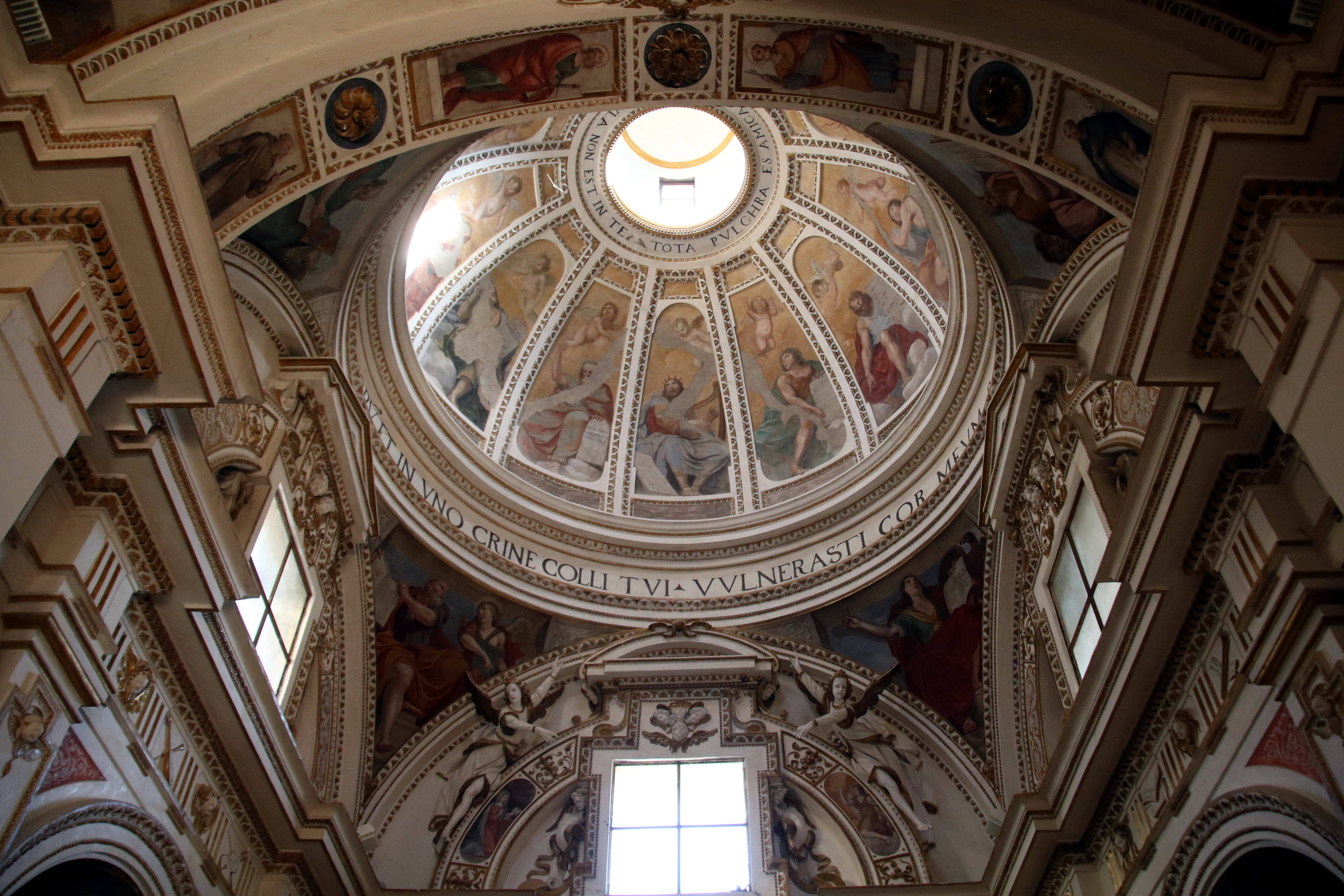
Dome featuring a fresco cycle arranged around the oculus

Its current layout is basilican, with a raised presbytery and aisles separated by columns carrying transverse arches with recessed archivolts, resting on capitals that were abraded during the Baroque works. The façade, dated to the first years of the 13th century, is built of small travertine blocks. Three portals open at ground level, with the central portal richly decorated; above, the façade is divided into five parts by four shaped lesenes, the two on the right continuing into the bell tower. Between the lesenes are three triple-light windows, and above them runs a band of blind arches resting on corbels carved as human and animal heads. Four projecting protomes emerge from the lesenes, two animal and one in the form of a crowned male head.

The central portal reuses Roman moldings, partly reworked, as jambs. At the springing of the arch are sculpted figures including, on the left, the winged bust of Saint Michael with a spear in one hand and an open book in the other, with a dragon attempting to bite the spear; beneath is an inscription stating that Rodulfus and Binellus made these works. On the other side is an angel holding a processional cross and a scroll. The crypt is composed of twelve bays defined by six slender columns.

In the crypt there are two 14th-century frescoes. In the sacristy there is an oil painting of the Last Supper, a Venetian-school work dated 1590.

=== San Silvestro ===
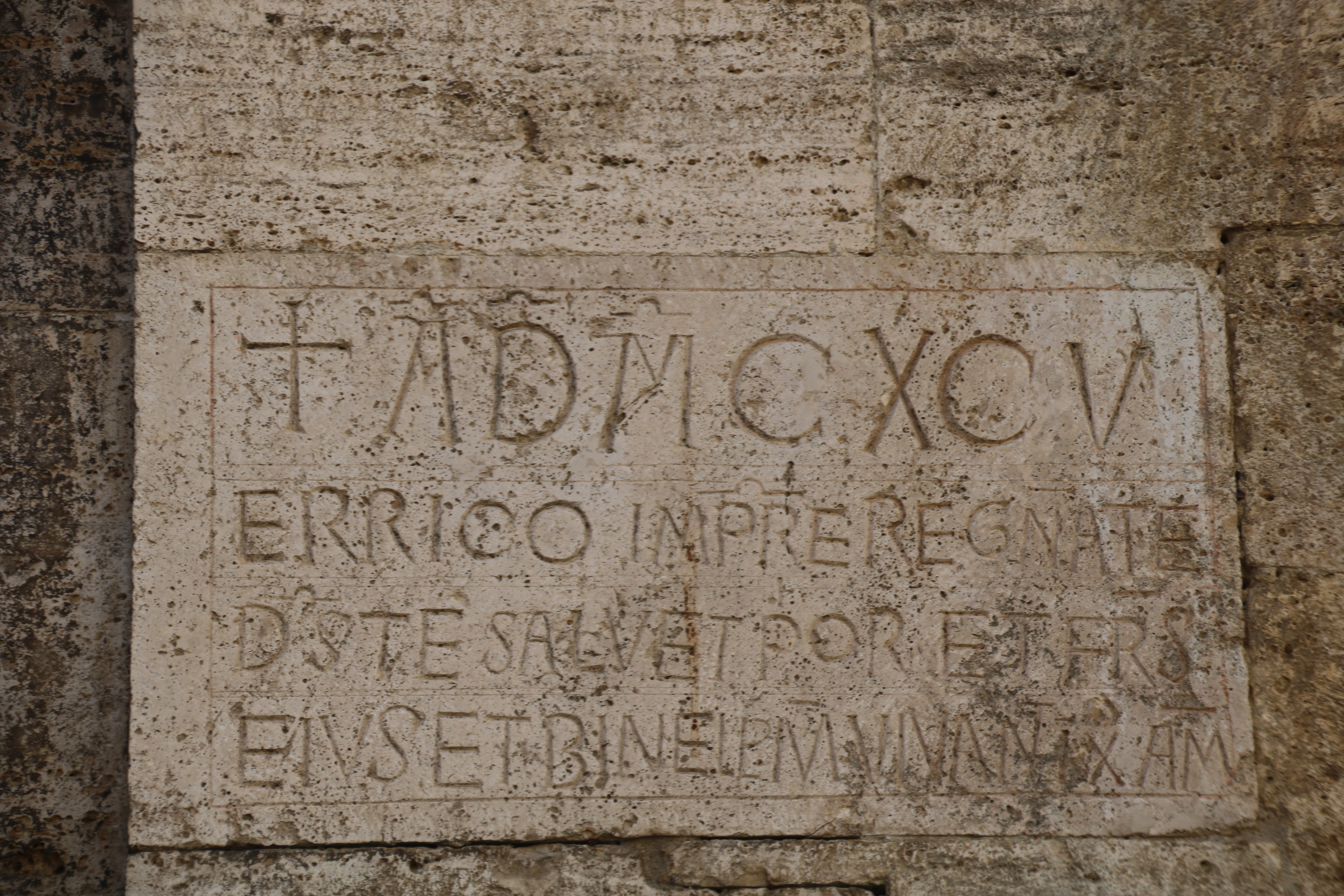
AD MCXCV inscribed on the façade of the church of San Silvestro

The church of San Silvestro was built in the Romanesque style. Its façade is incomplete and is thought to have been intended as a two-story composition, possibly crowned by a bell tower like that of San Michele on the opposite side of the square. A plaque dated 1195 on the right side of the façade commemorates maestro Binello as architect of the church.

Below a horizontal cornice carved with reliefs including hunting scenes, dragons, and human and animal protomes, three windows open: a central triple-light window and two flanking double-light windows. The triple-light window is supported by paired reused marble columns and is richly decorated with vegetal motifs; the double-light windows stand on twisted colonnettes whose bases are made from inverted capitals. At ground level, the recessed portal is decorated with vine scrolls and animals in combat.

The interior is austere but also monumental, with three naves carried on stocky columns. The lateral aisles have semi-barrel vaulting, noted as a rare feature in Umbrian religious buildings. At the end of the central nave, the presbytery is markedly raised above the crypt, which is a single hall with two columns supporting ribbed groin vaults.

=== San Francesco ===
In the Church of San Francesco, in the penultimate chapel on the right, there is a Crucifix between two angels and Saint Francis, attributed here to the Assisi painter Dono Doni. The last chapel was designed by the Perugian architect Alessi; its vault has terracotta bas-reliefs, and on the altar there is a depiction of Mary with Jesus in a manner imitating the Byzantine style.

To the left of the apse is a painting of the Virgin with Jesus crowning a young girl of the Ciccoli family, possibly by Dono Doni. In the sacristy there remains part of a 14th-century tempera panel with God blessing, and further remains of 14th-century frescoes are noted in an ancient chapel.

The legendary account of Francis of Assisi preaching to the birds is said to have taken place in a field outside Bevagna. The stone on which he allegedly stood when preaching to the birds is now in the Ciccoli Chapel of the Church of San Francesco.

=== Santissima Annunziata ===
The Church of the Santissima Annunziata stands a short distance from Bevagna on the road to Cannara and formerly belonged to the abbey of Sassovivo. In 1487 it was given to the Observant Friars Minor. Inside is a major 16th-century terracotta work in the form of a large altar, representing the Nativity of Mary, the Presentation at the Temple, the Marriage, the announcing Angel, and the Dream of Saint Joseph. A painting of Saint Sebastian is attributed to Camassei.

=== Church of Beato Giacomo ===
The Church of Beato Giacomo has a main doorway dating from the 14th century. In the semicircular upper lunette there is a Sienese-school fresco of Mary with the Child, Angels, and Saints. Inside, on the left, is the tomb of the Blessed Giacomo Bianconi, who died in 1301. In the chapel on the right is a 13th-century wooden carved crucifix; on the left is a wooden sculpture of the Madonna and Child, also of the 13th century.

=== Other religious buildings ===
The Church of Santa Lucia has, on the high altar, an altarpiece representing Saint Lucia, attributed to the school of Pietro Berrettini.

In the sacristy of the Church of San Filippo there is an oil painting by Andrea Camassei depicting Saint Philip and Saint Charles Borromeo.

The Church of Santa Maria del Monte has a high altar decorated with a rich bronze antependium with ornaments and figures, described as a 17th-century work.

The Church of Santa Margherita has, at the high altar, an oil painting of the Martyrdom of the church's titular saint, and an oil painting of the Conception placed on the door of the sacristy; both works are attributed to Camassei.

Other churches include:

- Church of Sant'Agostino (1316).
- Church of San Nicolò.
- Church of Santa Maria in Laurenzia, built in the 13th century and later enlarged.
- Church of San Vincenzo (known from the 12th century).

== Culture ==
=== Palazzo dei Consoli ===
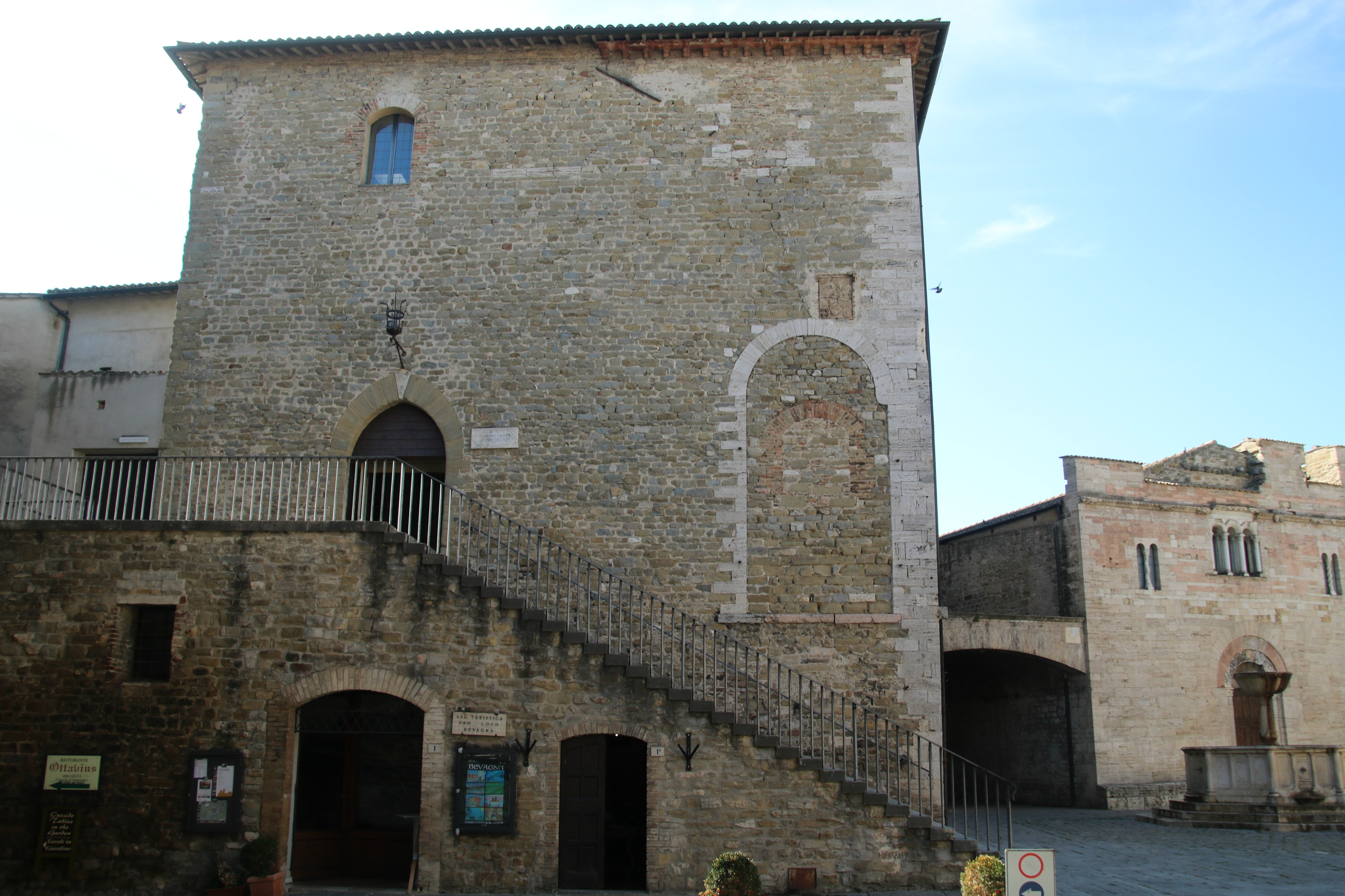
Palazzo dei Consoli

The Palazzo dei Consoli was built in the second half of the 13th century, possibly by the same Maestro Prode credited with the Palazzo Comunale of Spello. Access is by a broad staircase leading through a doorway surmounted by the coat of arms of the Trinci and the old emblem of Bevagna, showing four honey jars, directly to the first floor. The building includes a sturdy ground-level loggia with pointed arches covered by ribbed vaults, and a large vaulted passage created in 1560 to allow the consuls to pass directly into the church of San Silvestro to attend religious functions. The mass of the masonry is lightened on the upper stories by a double order of mullioned windows.

Since 1886 the building has housed the Teatro Torti.

=== Fontana Monumentale ===
The monumental fountain in the main square was inaugurated in 1896. It was built over a medieval well that had supplied water to the historic center.

=== Palazzo Lepri ===
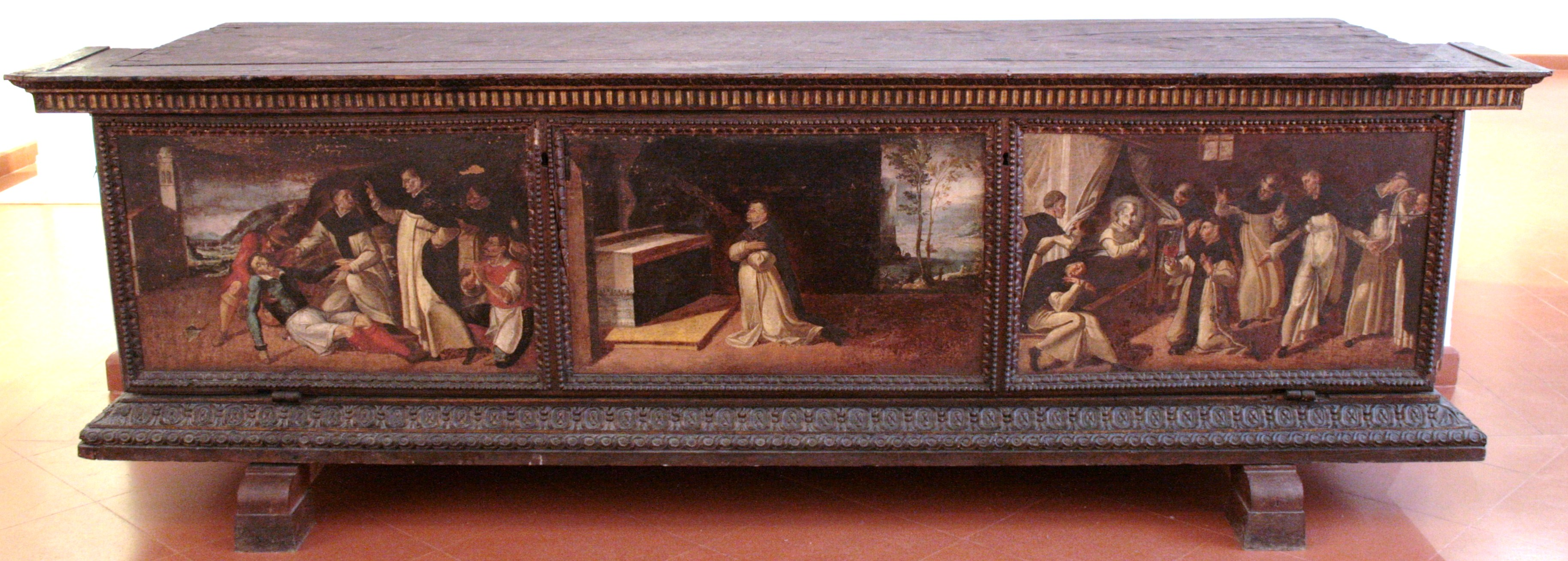
Funeral casket of Blessed Giacomo Bianconi, preserved in the museum

The municipal seat is housed in Palazzo Lepri, built in the late 18th century by the architect Andrea Vici for the Lepri family. It has a Neoclassical façade and an entrance enriched by an elegant wrought-iron grille. The atrium features Doric columns with a balustrade above.

Along the staircase is a portion of an archaeological collection assembled and arranged in 1787 by Abbot Fabio Alberti. In the Giunta hall are three paintings by the local painter Paolo Spetta, dating to the mid-19th century. The council chamber is decorated with allegorical decorations and portraits of notable men of Bevagna painted in 1867–1868 by Mariano Piervittori. On the first floor are the library, the historical archive, and the picture gallery. Paintings by Dono Doni, Ascensidonio Spacca, and Andrea Camassei are also included.

The palace houses a notable collection of Roman inscriptions and sculptures. It also preserves a silver statue of Bishop Saint Vincent, protector of Bevagna, a chased work attributed to the Flemish artist Adolfo Guap and dated to the 17th century.

=== Temple ===
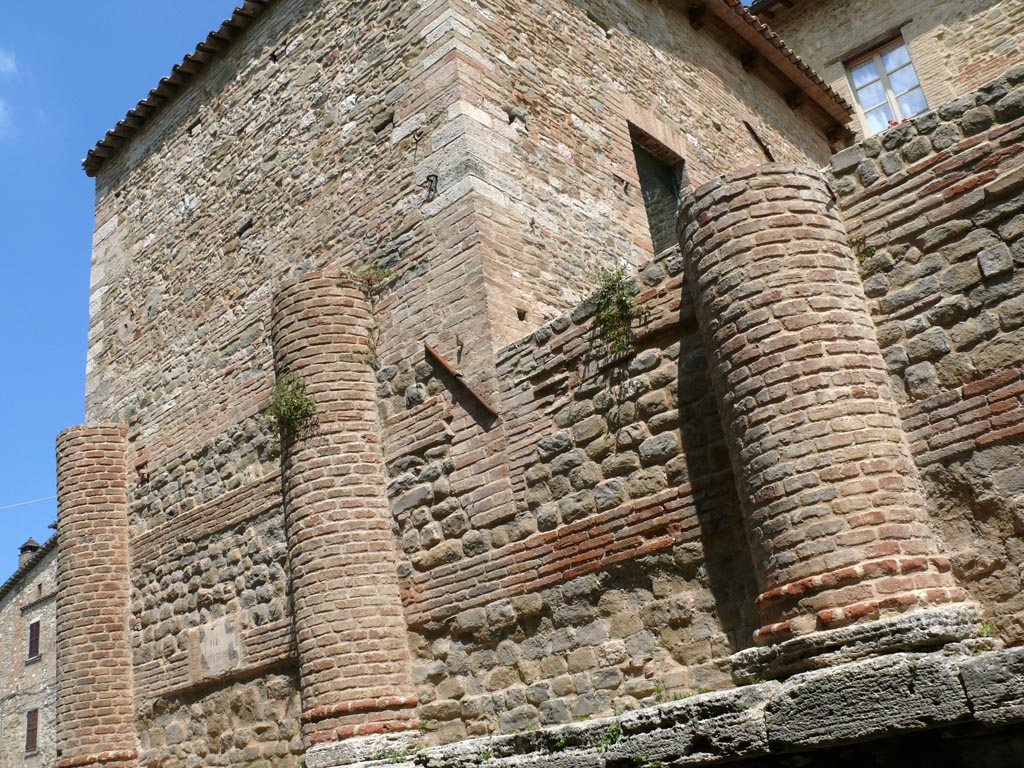
Traces of the Roman temple

The Roman temple is the only known temple of the ancient city and was later converted into the church of the Madonna della Neve. The rear part is well preserved. The building was a pseudo-peripteral tetrastyle temple. Only the cella on a high podium survives, while the columned pronaos and front steps are lost. The structure measures 12.25 m in length and 10.77 m in width.

The cella wall is built in opus mixtum, with courses of small sandstone blocks alternating with brick bands. The exterior has four pilasters at the rear and six half-columns along the sides. Traces of stucco remain on the walls.

The temple dates to the 2nd century AD and belongs to a phase of building activity in the municipium during the Hadrianic period, the same phase as the nearby bath mosaic.

The temple is said to have been dedicated to Mars, or according to others to Vertumnus.

=== Bath building ===
The bath building was a public structure with several rooms, including a caldarium and a tepidarium. The main room is rectangular, with one long side marked by a semicircular niche flanked by two rectangular niches. The walls were covered with marble slabs.

A brick-lined channel runs beneath the floor, covered with a pitched roof, from which smaller ducts branch off. These drains served an area rich in groundwater.

The floor is a mosaic made of large black and white tesserae. The scene is framed by a double black band, while the niches have floral decoration bordered by a strip of the same color.

The decoration follows common bath themes and uses marine imagery: tritons and hippocamps appear on the short sides, while the center shows octopuses, dolphins, and lobsters.

The figures are black on a white background, with details picked out in white. This type matches other marine mosaics found at Ostia and Capua, linked to bath buildings and dated to the 2nd century AD.

The bath building once stood at a place called Imbersato, a name said to derive from imber sacer ("sacred bath").

=== Roman theater ===
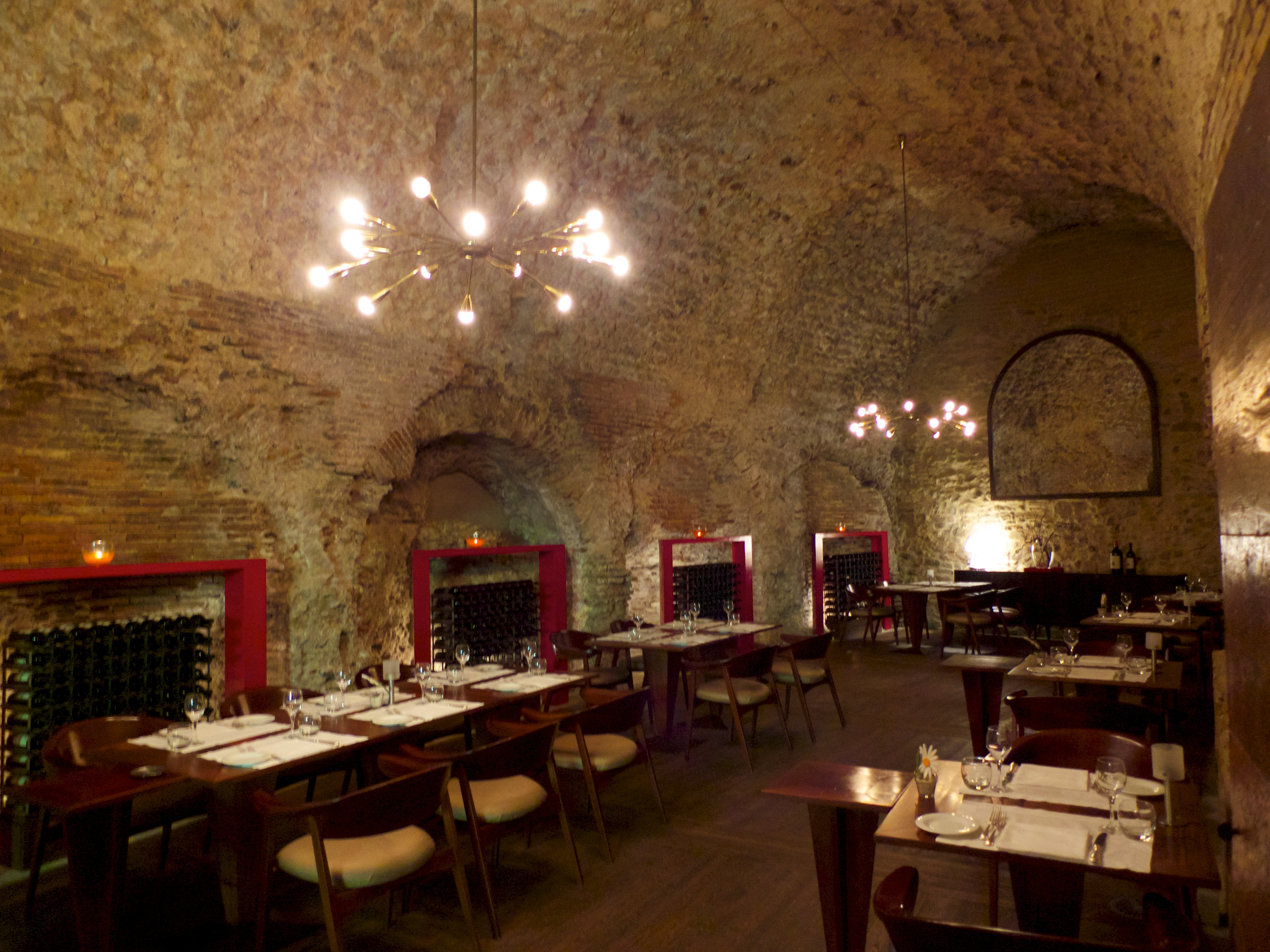
Interior of the Roman theater, now incorporated into modern use

The theater stood near the forum, on the slope of the hill where the church of San Francesco now stands. Its form can be reconstructed from visible remains and from the layout of the area between Via Flaminia (now Corso Matteotti) and Via San Francesco. The remains shaped later development, as nearby streets and buildings follow the plan of the Roman structure.

Two semicircular ambulacra survive, with their vaulting intact. These supported the cavea and are now visible in the basements of private houses. The theater dates to the 2nd century AD, though an earlier phase in the 1st century AD is possible.

=== Other archeological sites ===
Remains of the Roman amphitheatre exist in the area of the monastero del Monte. The walls are about 1.50 metres (4 ft 11 in) thick, and the widest of the visible corridors is about 4.85 metres (15.9 ft) wide, brick-faced and covered by a semicircular vault.

=== Other sights ===
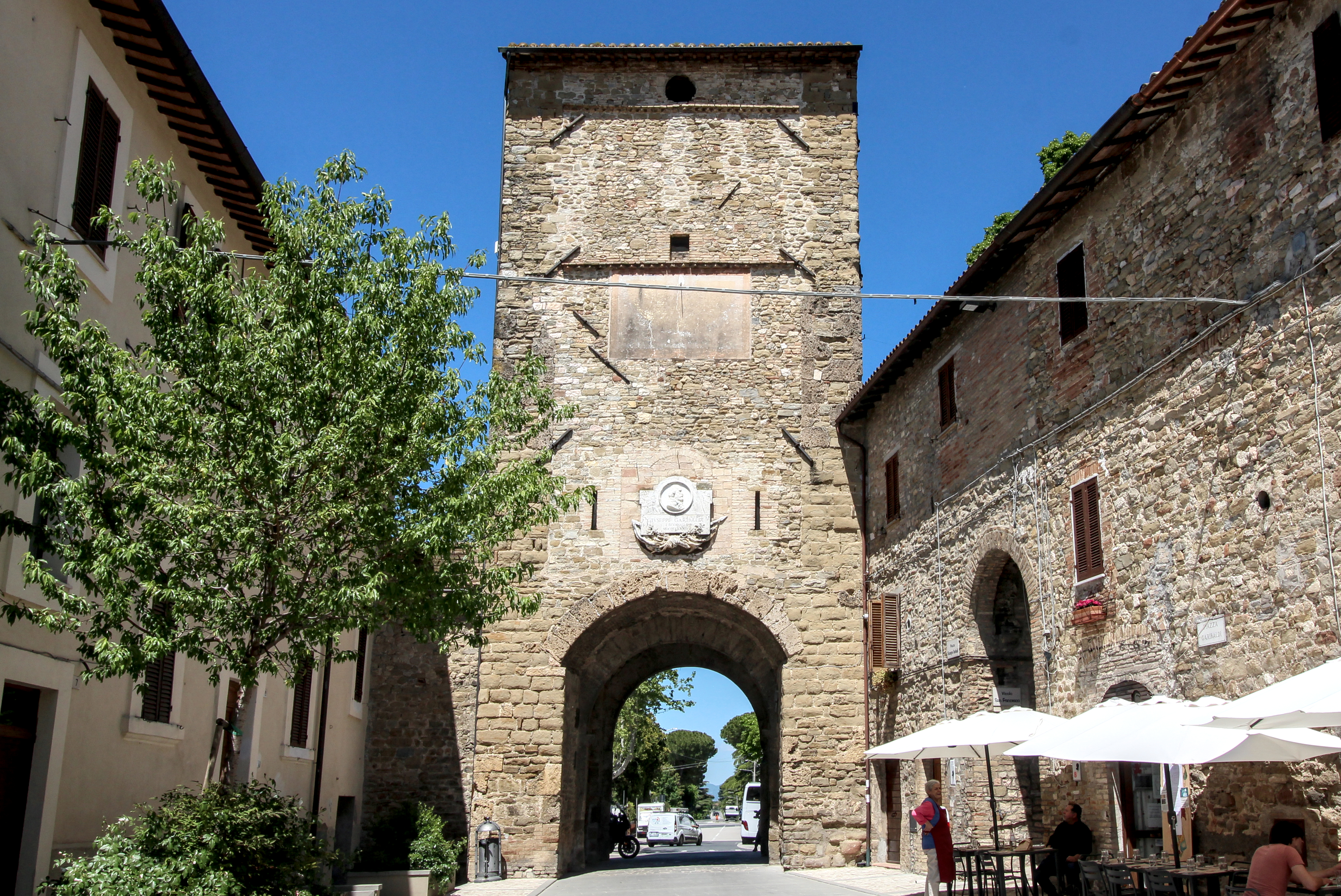
Porta Cannara

- The medieval walls.
- Castle of Cantalupo.
- Castle of Castelbuono.
- Church of Limigiano.
- Castle of Torre del Colle.

=== Events ===
The main events held in Bevagna include:

- Primavera medievale (April): exposition of local culinary and artistic products held by the Associazione Mercato delle Gaitte.
- Arte in Tavola (end of April): Spring festival with exhibitions by local artists, concerts, exhibitions of local products and dishes with tastings.
- Mercato delle Gaite (June): big summer festival with medieval banquets, processions, challenges between the four gaite (quarters – those of San Giorgio, San Giovanni, San Pietro, and Santa Maria) and taverns.

== Notable people ==
Bevagna is credited as the birthplace of Sextus Aurelius Propertius and of Varenus, leader of the Umbri at Trasimene.

It is also given as the birthplace of Alfonso Ceccarelli, Angelo Cino (raised to the cardinalate by Gregory XII in 1408), and Cardinal Ambrogio de' Rinaldi.

In literary and scholarly life, Francesco Torti is linked with Bevagna, as is Francesco de Angelis, author of De confessionibus; Fulvio Bagliotti Boschi, who produced an ottava rima translation of Homer's Batrachomyomachia.

Religious and theological figures associated with Bevagna include Pantaleone, patriarch of Antioch, the Blessed Giacomo Bianconi, and the theologians and teachers Graziano Renzi, Lorenzo Fognoli, Filippo Onofri and Giambattista Piergili.

Scientific and medical figures connected with the town include Angelo Mattoli, a homeopathic physician, together with Caterino Andreozzi, author of De vipera, and Liberato Sabatini, president of the Botanical Garden of Rome.

In the arts, Andrea Camassei is included along with Fantini (said to have been Camassei's teacher), Ascenzionio Spacca (active at the end of the 16th century), Alessandro Camassei and Vincenzo Angeli. The singer and composer Odoardo Ceccarelli (c. 1600–1668) was also born in Bevagna.

In military affairs, the notable captains and warriors named for the 13th and 14th centuries are Andrea Bianconi and Tommaso, Rainaldo, Pietro and Francesco Ranaldi; later figures include Vincenzo Ventura, active in the defence of Malta against Muslims, Nardo Scalassi, who fought at Lepanto, and Giuseppe Alberti, who fought against the Turks in Hungary.
