= Andrea Camassei =

Italian painter

- The Massacre of the Niobids (Detail), Rome, Galleria Nazionale d'Arte Antica
- Born: November 1602; Macerata Feltria, Papal States
- Died: 18 August 1649 (aged 46); Rome, Papal States
- Education: Domenichino
- Known for: Painting
- Movement: Baroque
- Patron: Barberini family

Andrea Camassei (November 1602 – 18 August 1649) was an Italian Baroque painter and engraver mainly active in Rome under the patronage of the Barberini.

== Biography ==
=== Early career ===
He was born in Bevagna in Umbria to parents of modest means, Angelina d'Anton Maria Angeli and Lorenzo. He trained in Rome under Domenichino and was active in painting in the Palazzo Barberini. The Barberini commissioned him to participate, along with such established artists as Guido Reni, Andrea Sacchi, Giovanni Lanfranco and Pietro da Cortona, in the decoration of Santa Maria della Concezione, Rome (1631–8), to which Camassei contributed an altarpiece of the Lamentation (c. 1631). They also ordered religious and mythological paintings for their own collection and designs for book illustrations, such as the frontispiece for Girolamo Teti’s description of the Palazzo Barberini, Aedes Barberinae ad Quirinalem (Rome, 1642). He also painted for Taddeo Barberini, two large canvases (1638–39) depicting Massacre of the Niobids and Hunt of Diana.

=== Barberini downfall ===
On the death of Pope Urban VIII in 1644, his disgraced nephews fled into exile in France, and Camassei lacked steady patronage. In 1646–7 he was employed by Sacchi to paint two large frescoes for the Lateran Baptistery: the Triumph of Constantine and the Battle of the Milvian Bridge. For the composition of the latter, perhaps again because he found large compositions difficult, he turned for guidance to Raphael’s fresco of the same subject (completed by Raphael’s studio after his death, 1523–4; Rome, Vatican, Sala di Costantino). In 1648–9 he painted friezes illustrating the story of Bacchus and Ariadne in the Palazzo Pamphilj, Rome.

Camassei’s training with Domenichino, his aversion to large decorative commissions and the conventional rhetoric of his narratives link him with those painters in Rome, for example Giovanni Francesco Romanelli and Giacinto Gimignani, whose reserved manner offered a foil to the more flamboyant, decorative approach of Pietro da Cortona and his circle. Camassei’s style, with its emphasis on pastel colours, reflects his admiration for the work produced c. 1630 by Nicolas Poussin, Sacchi and Lanfranco, although his narratives lack the psychological acuity of either Poussin or Sacchi. The gently curved poses of his figures recall those of the Flemish sculptor François Duquesnoy.

Camassei’s drawings are mainly in red chalk, although there are some in black chalk and a few pen-and-wash studies. Characteristic red chalk studies include those (New York, Metropolitan Museum of Art) for the Martyrdom of St Sebastian (1633; Rome, San Sebastiano alla Polviera) and the St. Peter Meditating (Florence, Uffizi). Although his reputation faded after his death, he was given a brief biography at the end of Bellori’s life of Domenichino as well as biographies by Passeri and Pascoli.

== Gallery ==
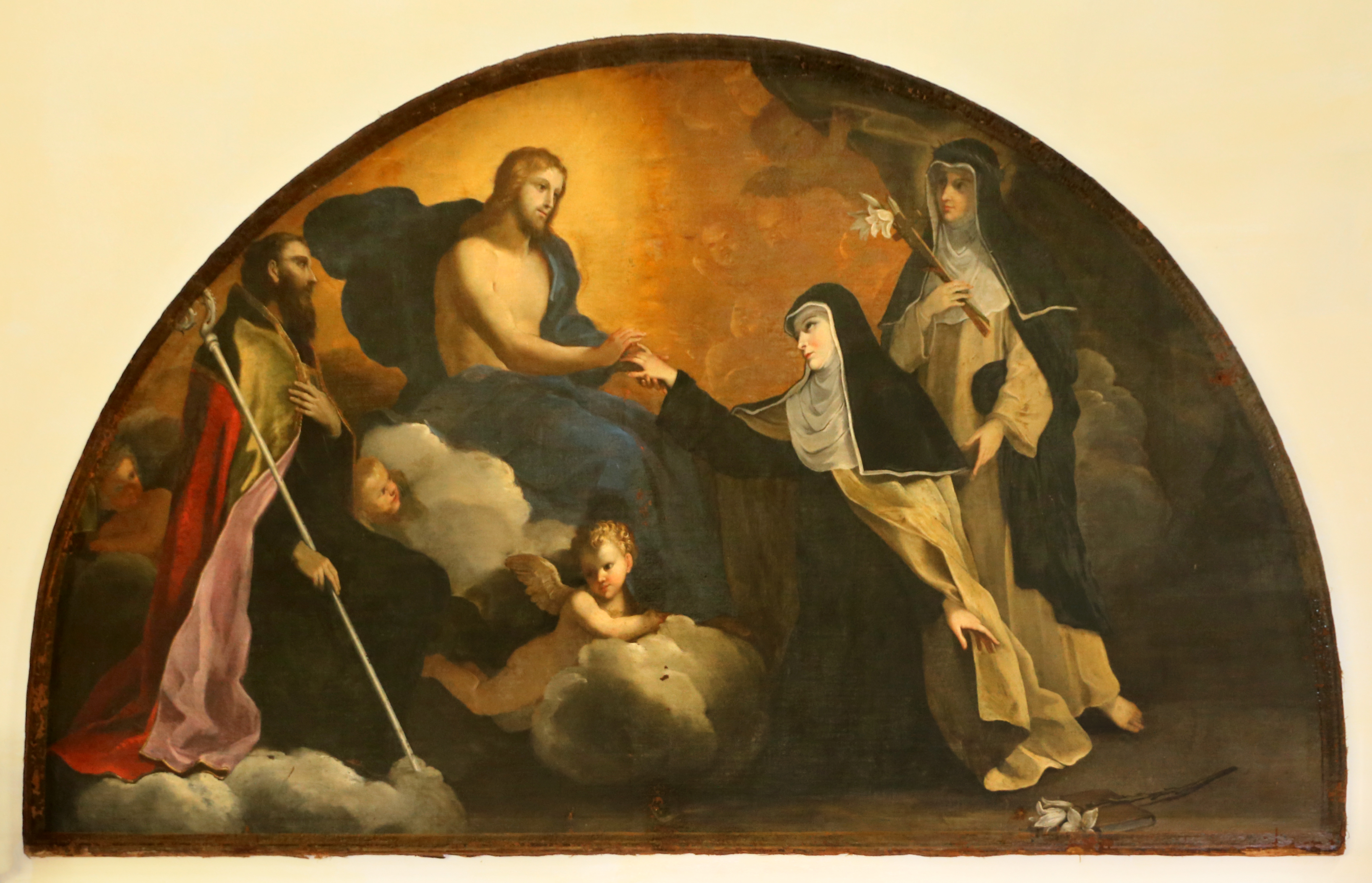
Jesus gives the ring to Saint Mary Magdalene de' Pazzi

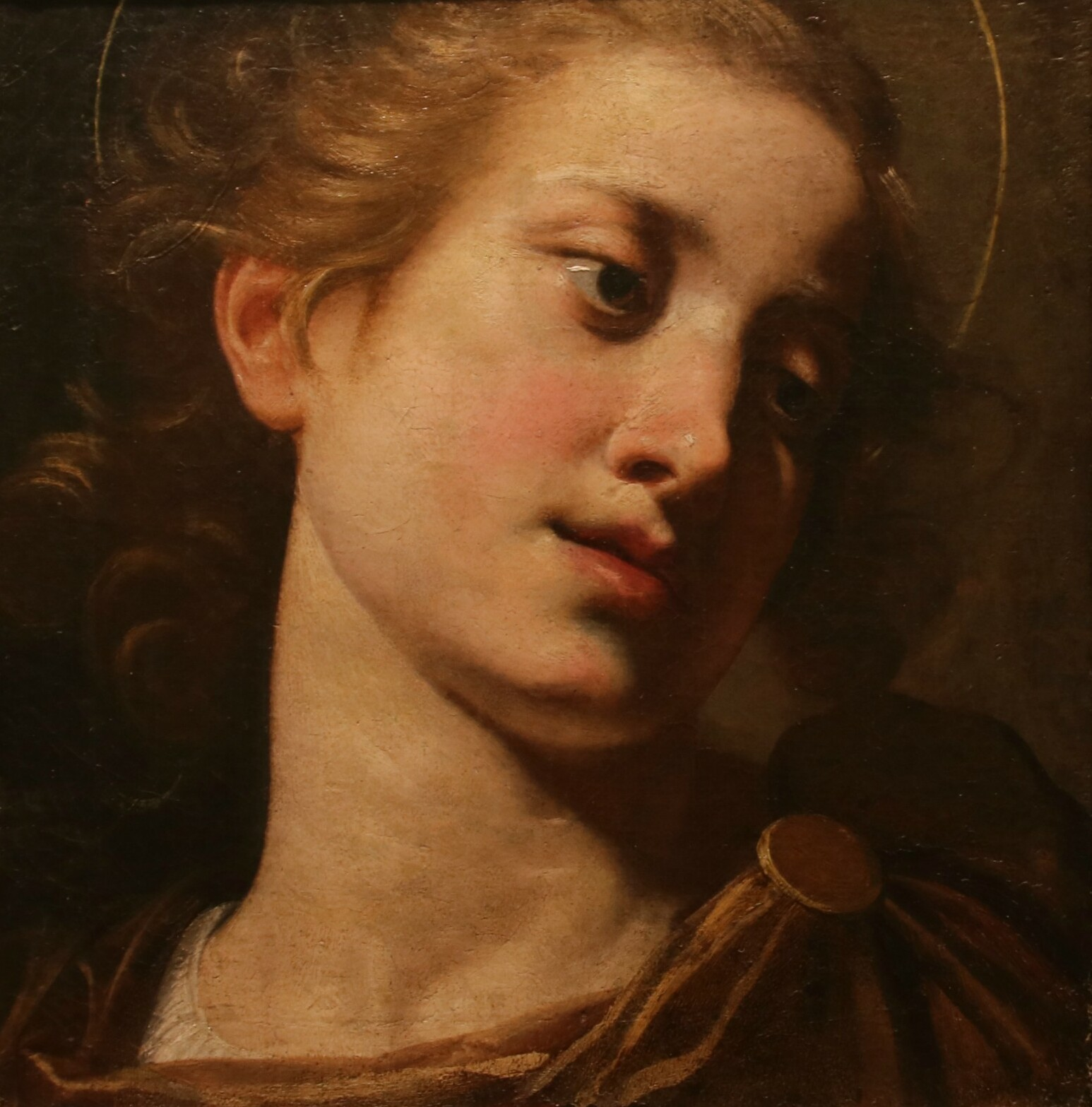
Head of a saint

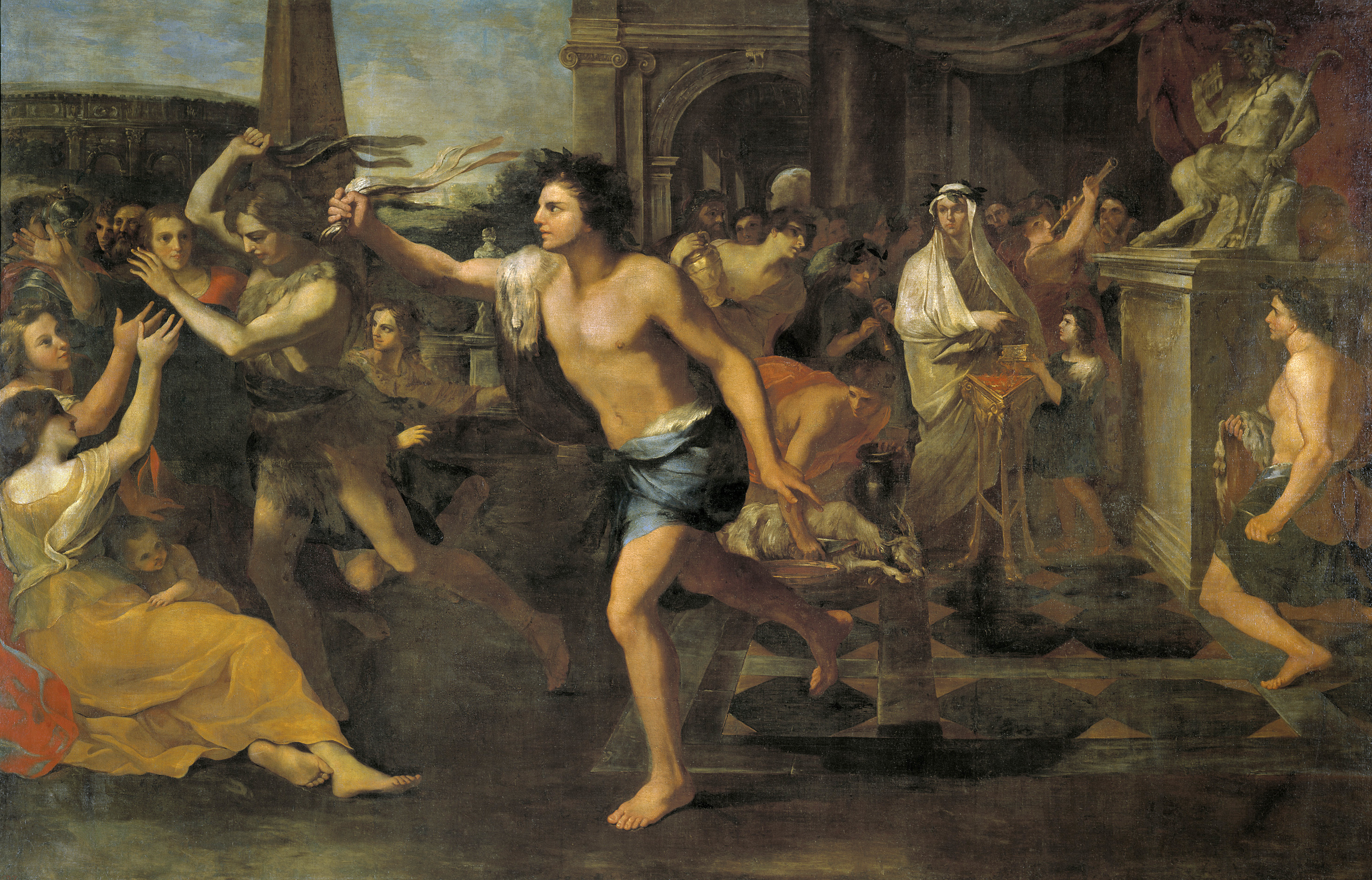
Lupercalia

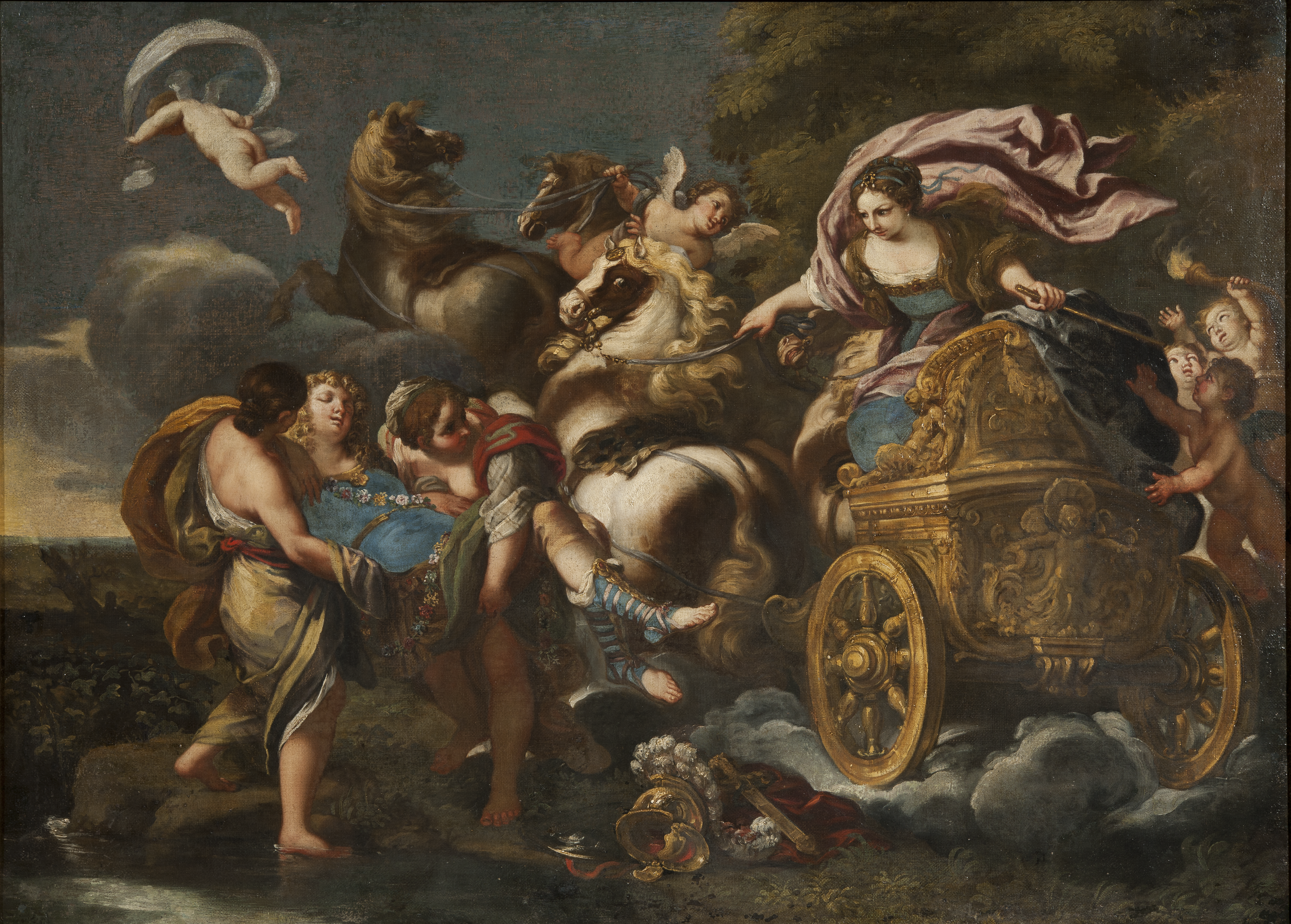
Armida abducts Rinaldo

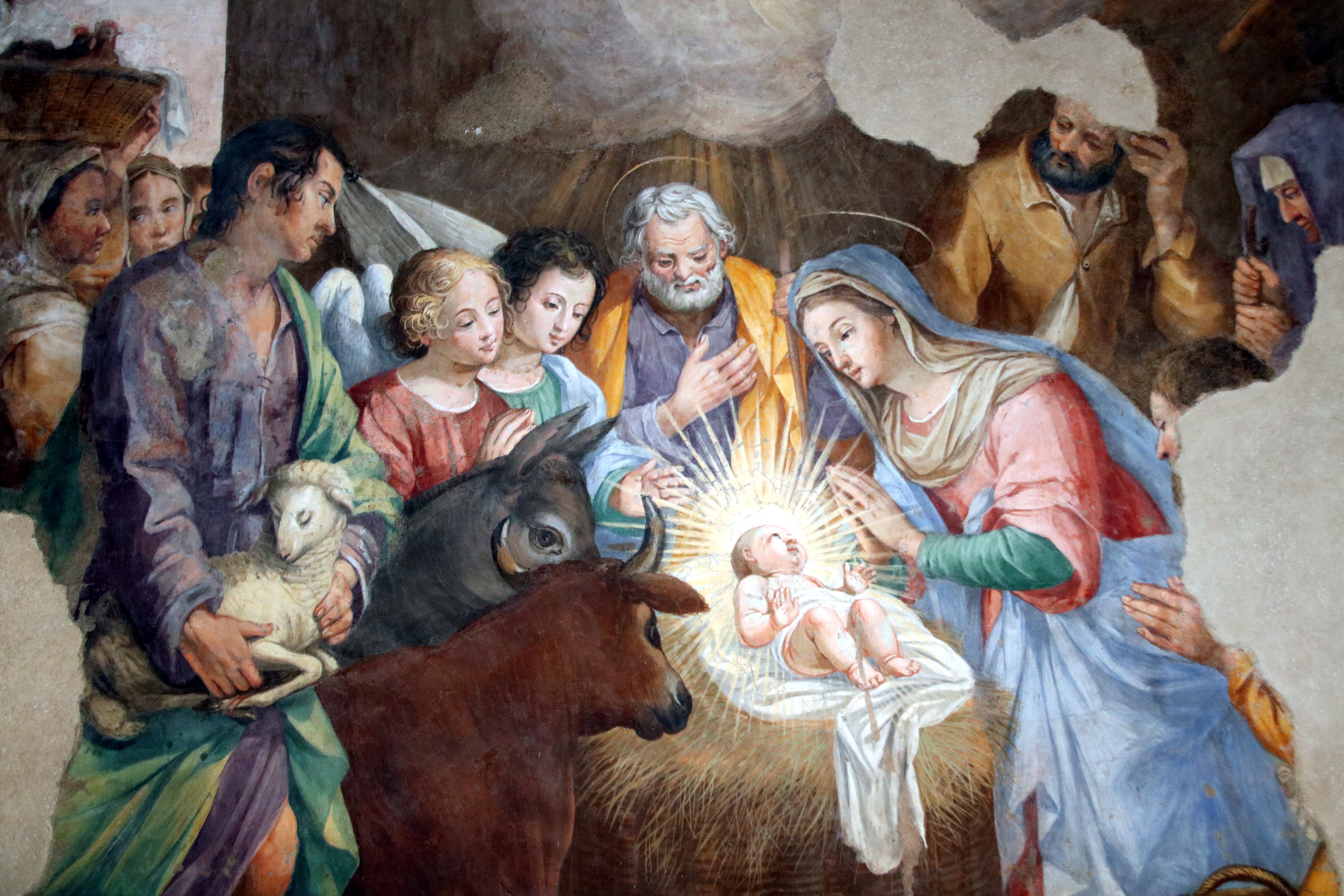
Nativity

The Creation of the Angels (Detail)

== Bibliography ==
- Wittkower, Rudolf (1993). Pelican History of Art, Art and Architecture Italy, 1600-1750. 1980. Penguin Books. p. 321.
- Farquhar, Maria (1855). Ralph Nicholson Wornum (ed.). Biographical catalogue of the principal Italian painters. London: Woodfall & Kinder. p. 35.
- Presenzini, Attilio (1880). Vita ed opere del pittore Andrea Camassei. Assisi: Sensi.
- Nessi, Silvestro (2005). Andrea Camassei: un pittore del Seicento tra Roma e l'Umbria. Perugia: Quattroemme.
