= Giacomo Bianconi =

Italian Roman Catholic priest (1220–1301)

Blessed Giacomo Bianconi O.P.
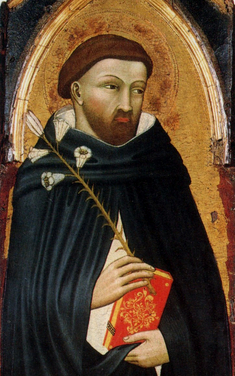
- Painting by Benedetto di Bindo (c. 1415)

Priest
- Born: 7 March 1220; Mevania, Spoleto, Umbria, Papal States
- Died: 22 August 1301 (aged 81); Mevania, Spoleto, Umbria, Papal States
- Venerated in: Roman Catholic Church
- Beatified: 18 May 1672, Saint Peter's Basilica, Papal States by Pope Clement X
- Feast: 22 August
- Attributes: Dominican habit
- Patronage: Mevania

Giacomo Bianconi (7 March 1220 – 22 August 1301) was an Italian Roman Catholic priest and a professed member of the Order of Preachers. Bianconi — who hailed from Umbria — joined the order in his adolescence and dedicated his pastoral career to his flock and on one notable occasion aided refugees when Frederick II sacked the area in 1248. He also combatted heresies and managed to convert one of their chief propagators while also distinguishing himself through his life of extreme poorness that went past the Dominican standards.

The difficult road to sainthood commenced under Pope Paul V in 1608 and was stalled several times until Pope Urban VIII decided to preside over the beatification in 1641 - the process had failed then and the pontiff's death exacerbated the prospect of the process never facing completion. It reopened one final time and allowed - on 18 May 1672 - for Pope Clement X to confirm Bianconi's beatification on the recognition of the late priest's local 'cultus' - or popular veneration.

== Life ==
Giacomo Bianconi was born on 7 March 1220 in Umbria. His birth spouted a miracle when - as he was born - three brilliant bright stars containing three separate images of friars amongst the clouds: these individuals were later confirmed as Bianconi himself as well as Thomas Aquinas and Ambrose of Siena. In his childhood he achieved peace between two quarreling families.

Bianconi became a member of the Order of Preachers in Spoleto in 1236 during his mid-adolescence after meeting two Dominican friars preach during Lent. He decided to choose an extreme life of poorness that exceeded Dominican standards. He founded - and became the first prior at the same time - the convent in Mevania. Bianconi aided survivors and refugees from Mevania in 1248 after Frederick II sacked the town in 1248.

He helped to quash the Nicolaites heretical movement in Umbria and scored a success against the opposition when he managed to convert its chief propagator named Ortinellus. Bianconi became provincial minister for the order in 1281 and later made the prior of all Dominican friaries in Spoleto in 1291 and in Foligno in 1299. He became active in the rebuilding of the town which culminated in the rebuilding of the Palazzo dei Consoli in 1270. In 1291 he received approval to rebuild the church of San Giorgio in Mevania and to construct an adjoining convent to it and he later founded two nunneries known as Santa Lucia and Santa Margherita. He served also as the lector at San Domenico in Orvieto and became the spiritual advisor of Jane of Orvieto.

Father Bianconi once knelt before a crucifix and experienced doubts about his personal salvation and at that moment blood spurted from it which led to the voice of Jesus Christ to tell the priest that the blood was a sign that he would be saved. On another occasion his mother was so shocked at the poor condition of his habit that she gave him the funds needed to purchase another though her son wanted to purchase a crucifix for his cell. But his mother reminded him he had to purchase a habit instead with Bianconi assuring her that the garment he wore before her was the one he purchased using her gift.

Bianconi died on 22 August 1301. Both Saint George and Saint Dominic appeared to him as he died as well as the Madonna who he believed would take him to Heaven. Before he died he brought fresh water to his cell so he and his companions could drink but ended up drinking wine when the water turned into it.

His remains were buried in San Giorgio though his remains were later relocated in 1302 to the counter-façade of Ss. Domenico e Giacomo to the left of the entrance. Pope Boniface IX offered a papal indulgence to those who venerated his remains during the first week of the fifth month in 1397 as an impetus for potential sainthood. His remains were moved again in 1589 and for the final time to a gilded bronze urn on the high altar in 1686.

== Beatification ==
Bianconi's cause for beatification commenced in 1608 under Pope Paul V once Cardinal Alfonso Visconti inaugurated the process itself. Cardinal Maffeo Barberini - later Pope Urban VIII - reopened the process after a brief stall in 1612 and led to a formal process being opened in 1632 under three bishops including the Bishop of Spoleto Lorenzo Castrucci. That process too was inconclusive and a second was needed because Urban VIII wanted to preside over Bianconi's beatification in 1641. But that too stalled and the death of the pontiff also halted prospects for beatification.

The final process launched in 1658 and this led to the announcement that Bianconi would be beatified. He received beatification from Pope Clement X on 18 May 1672 after the pontiff provided ratification to the late priest's local and enduring 'cultus' - or popular devotion and veneration - thus providing a conclusion to a long and difficult process.

== See also ==
- Catholic Church in Italy
- Chronological list of saints and blesseds
- List of beatified people
