= Castelbuono, Bevagna =

Castelbuono
- Frazione
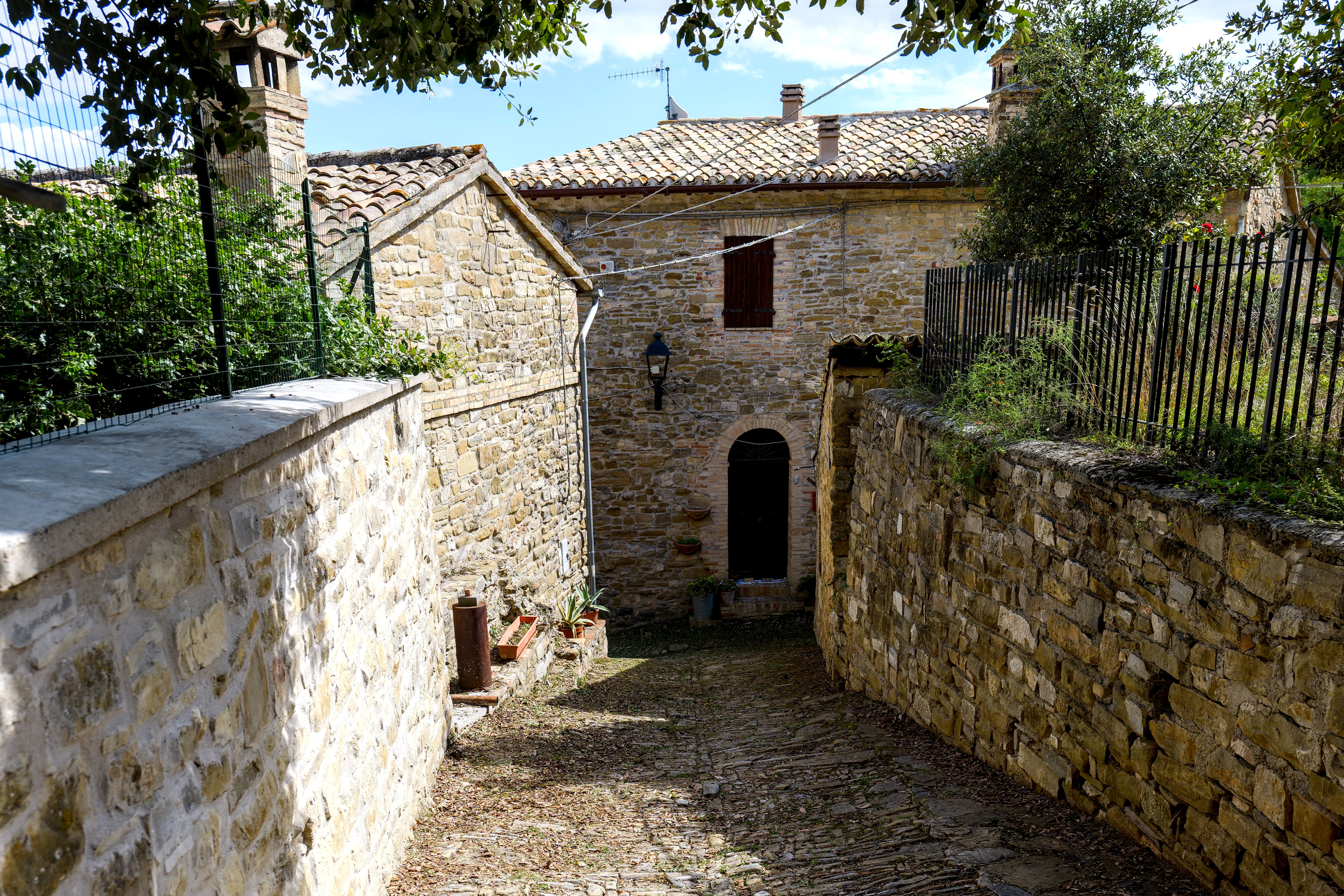
- Castelbuono, Maestà.

- Location within Italy
- Coordinates: 42°57′18″N 12°32′58″E
- Country: Italy
- Region: Umbria
- Province: Perugia
- Comune: Bevagna
- Elevation: 354 m (1,161 ft)

Population (2001)
  - Total: 10
- Time zone: UTC+1 (CET)
  - Summer (DST): UTC+2 (CEST)
- Postcode: 06084
- Area code: 075

Castelbuono is a castle and a hamlet which stands at an elevation of 354 metres above sea level in the Province of Perugia, Umbria, central Italy. In local government terms it is a frazione of the comune of Bevagna. At the time of the Istat census of 2001 it had 10 inhabitants.

== Castle ==
Castelbuono features the walled medieval structure of a castle, two churches and some other buildings. Castelbuono suffered severe damages by the earthquake of 1997. Just Castelbuono is the Maestà fresco (14th century), presumed to be by Giovanni di Corraduccio. It shows the Madonna of the Rose and the Child venerated by St. Michael Arcangel and St. Stephen, and was later restored by Dino Rosselletti. The restoration of the Maestà was initiated by "Pro Loco Cantalupo-Castelbuono" and financed by Cantalupo's "Sagra della Lumaca" (the festival of the snails).

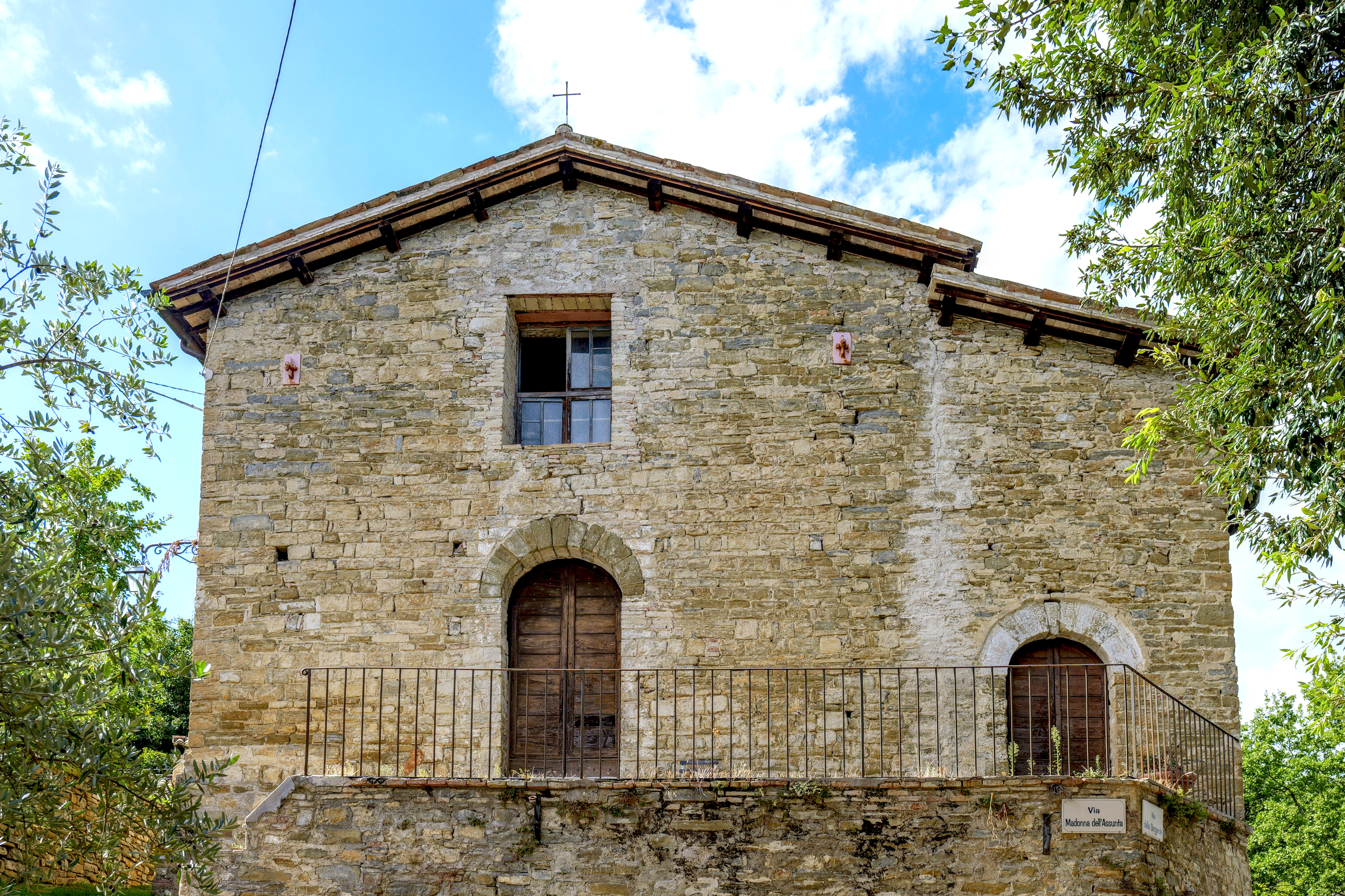
church Santa Maria Assunta

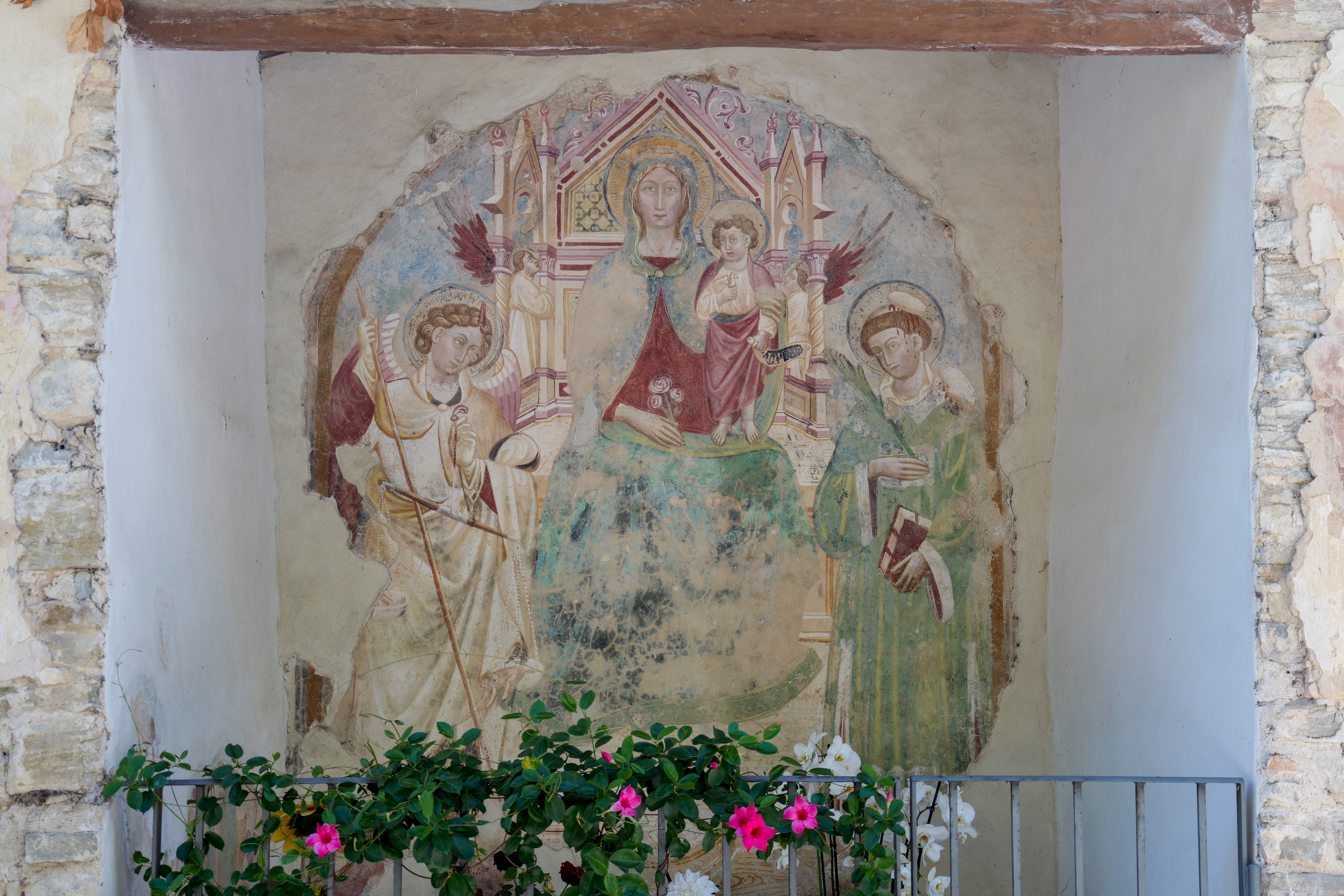
the aedicula Madonna della Rosa
