= Ascensidonio Spacca =

Italian painter

Ascensidonio Spacca, known as Il Fantino di Bevagna (ca. 1557 – 1646) was an Italian painter, active in a late-Mannerist style.

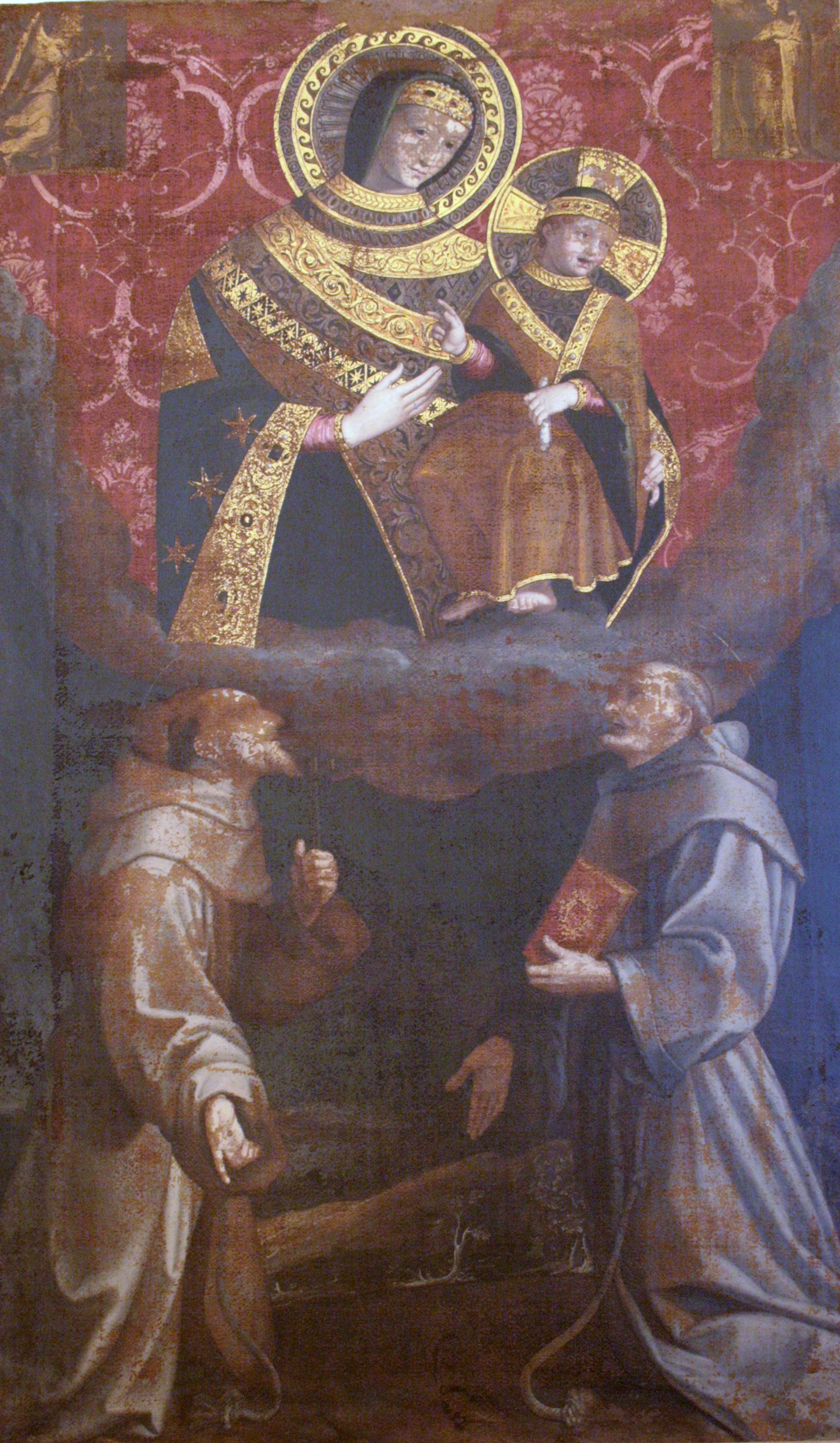
Madonna di Costantinopoli and Saints pray for the Town at the Museo Civico of Bevagna

== Biography ==
He was born in Bevagna. In Bevagna, he painted a Pietà for the church of San Francesco, also painted for the church of Santi Domenico e Giacomo, and has a painting depicting the Madonna of Constantinopoli and Saints on display in the Museo Civico.

He painted the altarpiece in the Bontadosi Chapel of the church of San Francesco in Montefalco. He painted a Last Supper in the apse of the parish church of Gualdo Cattaneo. He painted for the Cassa Ecclesiastica (1562) and the Church of Bethlem of Fuligno, and for the church of Santa Maria di Vallegloria (1575) of Spello.
