= Urvinum Hortense =

Archeological site in Italy

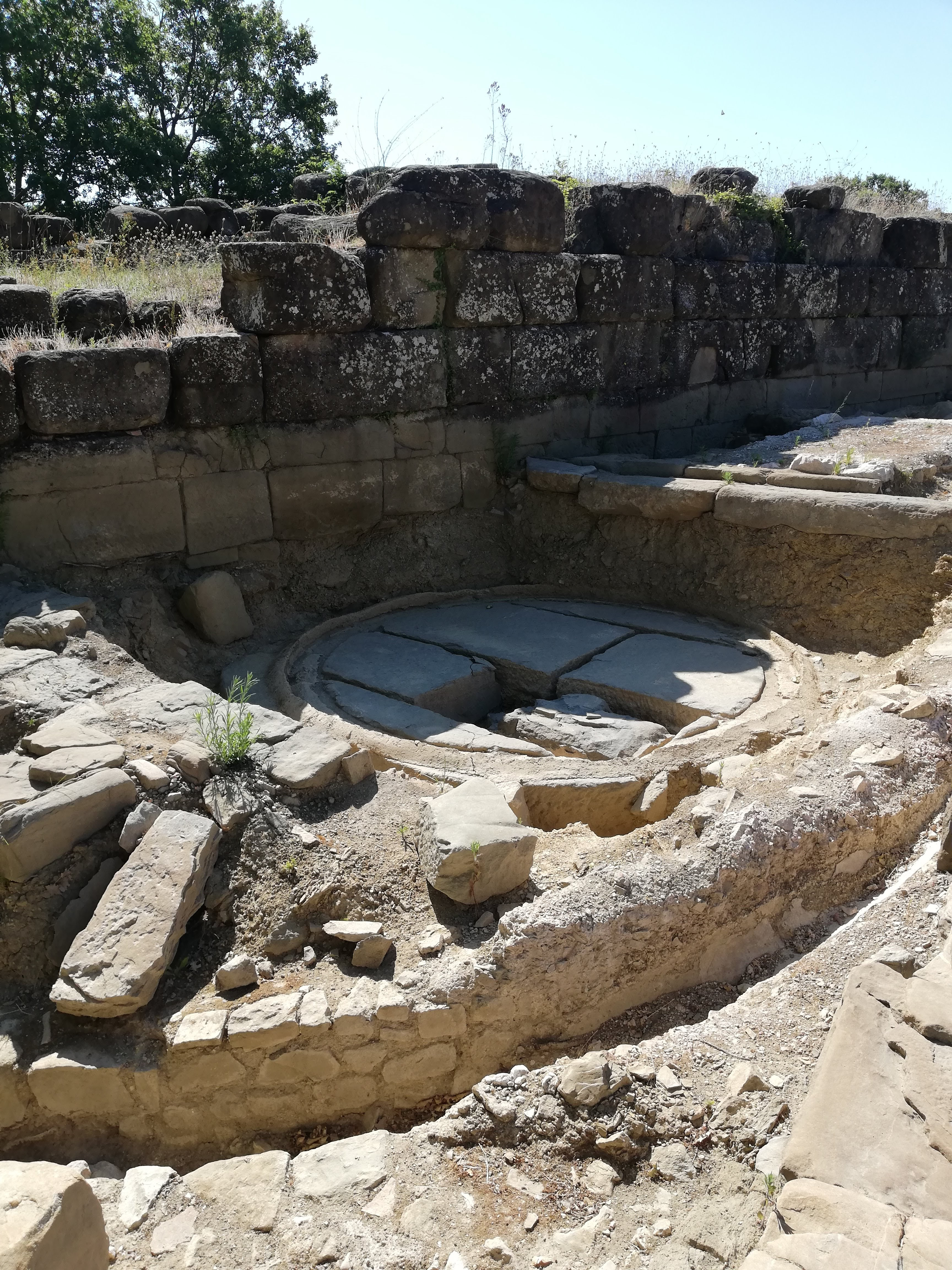

- Location within Umbria
- 42°59′04.42″N 12°31′29.68″E
- Type: Settlement
- Cultures: Roman
- Region: Umbria (Province of Perugia)

Site notes
- Condition: Ruined
- Public access: Yes

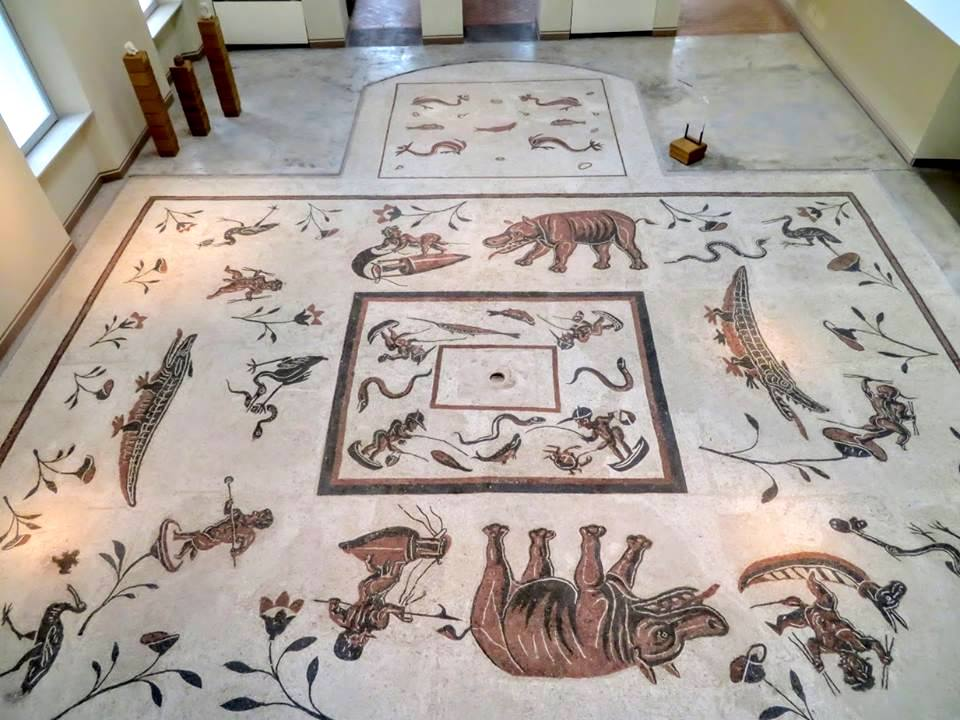
Mosaic from baths

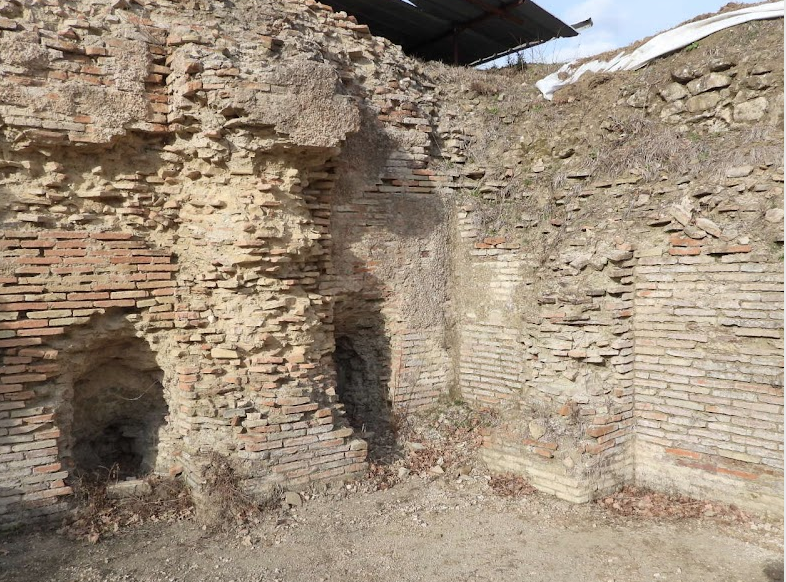
Urvinum Hortense

Urvinum Hortense was an ancient Roman town near modern Collemancio, Cannara, Italy.

It was mentioned by Pliny the Elder in a roughly alphabetical and contextless list.

In the early 1930s an amateur archaeologist found ancient remains on a hilltop not far from his hometown and declared them to be the ruins of Urvinum Hortense.

Excavations since 2005 have revealed some monumental buildings of the city.

The spectacular polychrome mosaic from the thermal baths is now displayed in the Cannara museum. It dates to the 1st-2nd century AD. In a "Nilotic" scene, six pygmies with highly caricatured features are depicted along the four sides hunting exotic animals surrounded by luxuriant vegetation.

The baths are associated with an important and long-standing family of the town, the gens Fiscilia and date from the late Republican era. The baths were situated on the western edge of the plateau with shelter from northern winds and exposure to the sun. The room of the mosaic was the functional hub of the baths.

== See also ==
- Hortensia gens
- Regio VI Umbria
