= Limigiano =

- Frazione
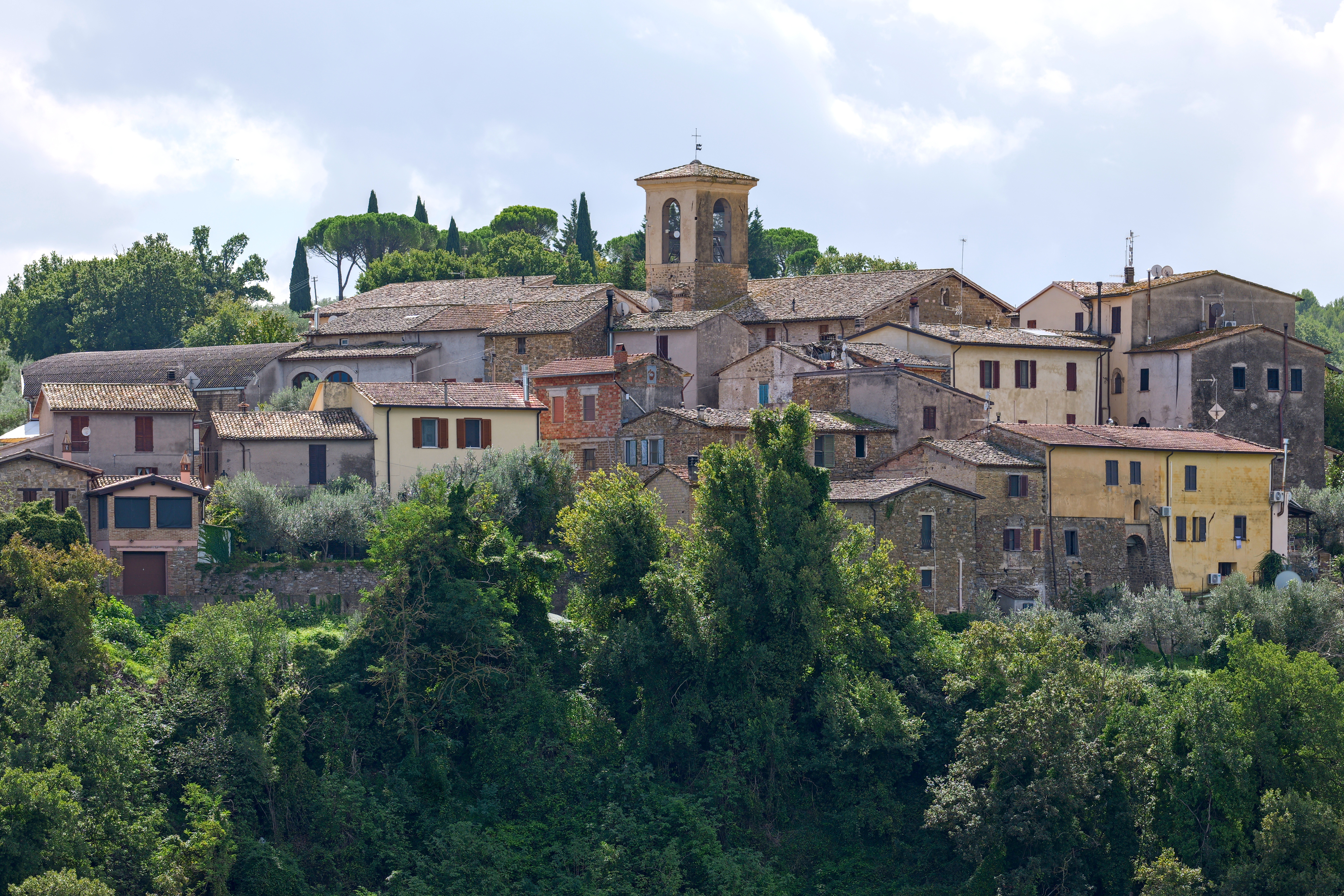
- Limigiano

- Location within Italy
- Coordinates: 42°59′00″N 12°33′00″E
- Country: Italy
- Region: Umbria
- Province: Perugia
- Comune: Bevagna
- Elevation: 333 m (1,093 ft)

Population (2001)
  - Total: 56
- Time zone: UTC+1 (CET)
  - Summer (DST): UTC+2 (CEST)
- Postcode: 06031
- Area code: 0742

Limigiano is a frazione of the comune of Bevagna in the Province of Perugia, Umbria, central Italy. It stands at an elevation of 333 metres above sea level. At the time of the Istat census of 2001 it had 56 inhabitants.

Limigiano is a rural village, surrounded by large olive groves.

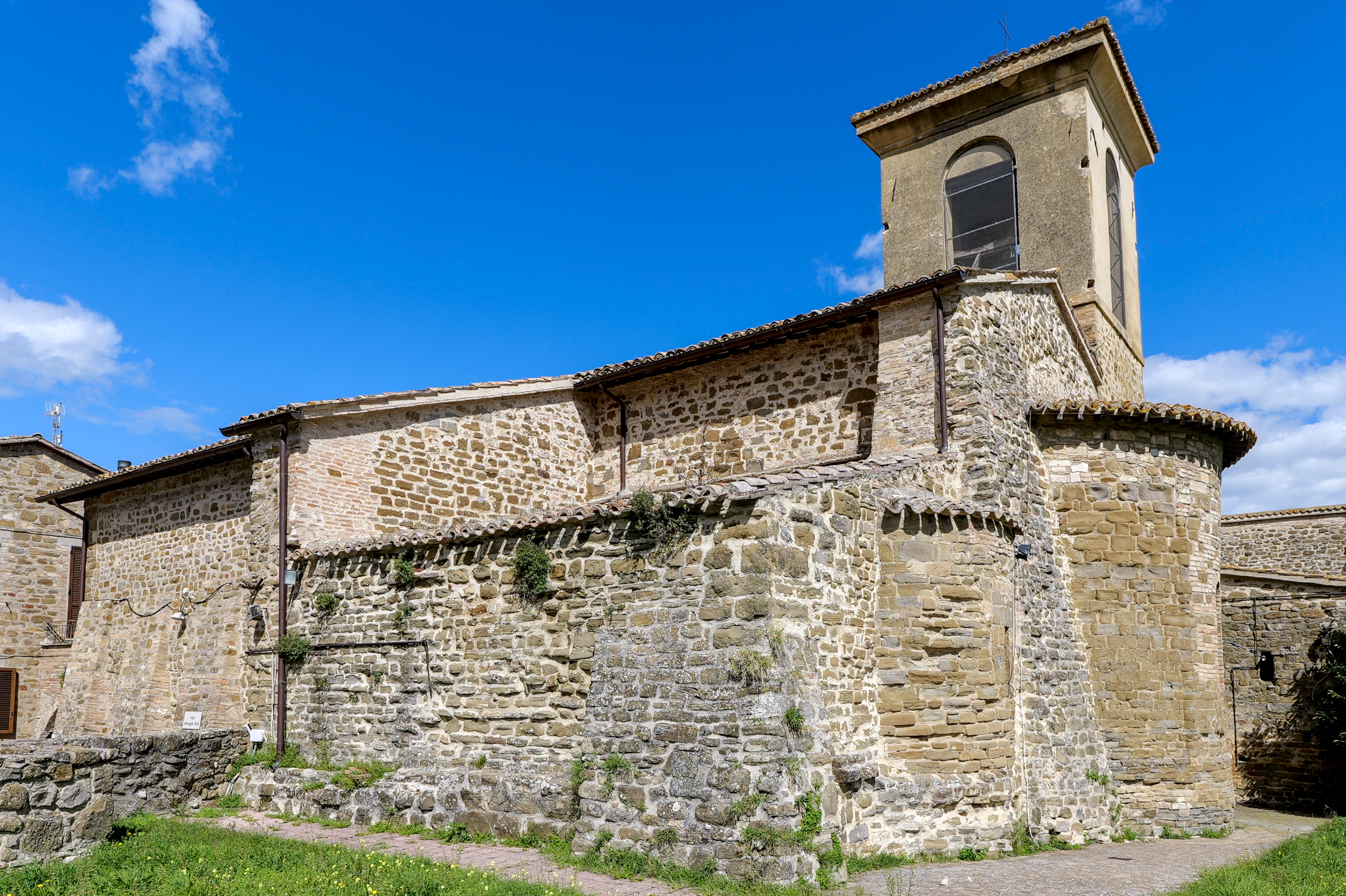
San Michele church.

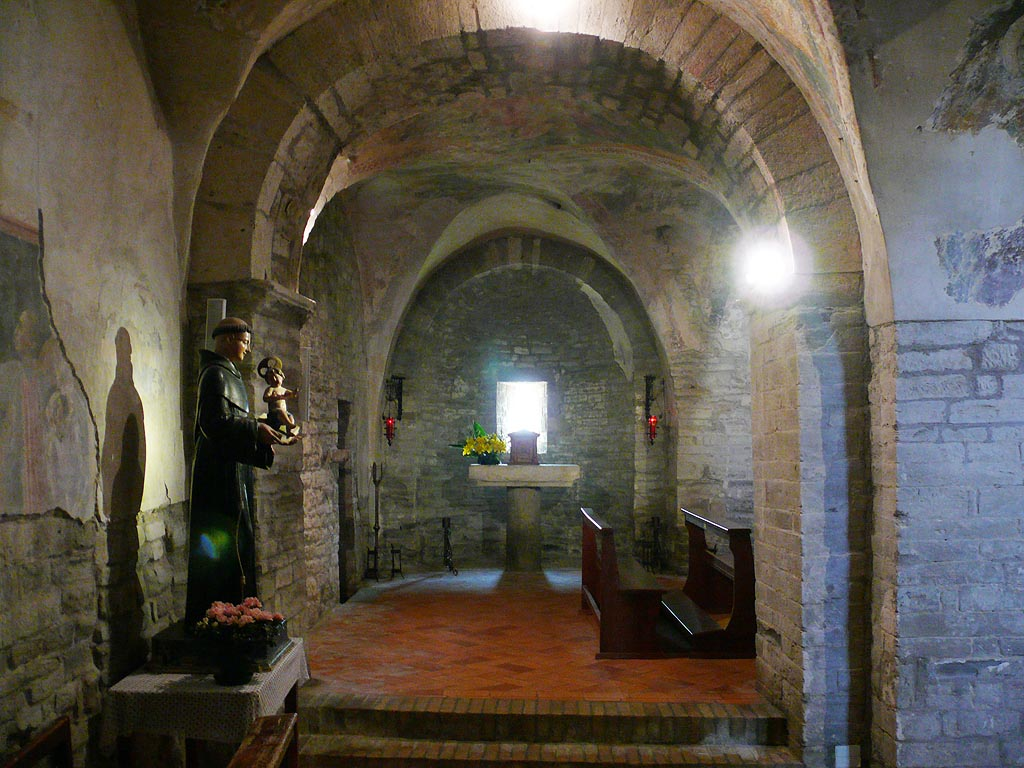
San Michele church.

The main point of interest is the Romanesque abbey church of San Michele Arcangelo. While the foundations are from the 11th century, the current structure dates back to the 13th century. The church was extended and altered through several phases of construction, repair, and maintenance in the Middle Ages. Today the church has a naves and two aisles, each finishing in an apse. The church was renovated in 1947 but the beautiful frescoes (some probably by the school of Niccolò Alunno) are in various stages of deterioration, mostly due to the damage from the 1997 Umbria and Marche earthquake and the leaking in of rainwater since then. Of the medieval castle only a few ruins can be found.
