= San Martino, Spello =

Roman Catholic church in Spello, Italy

Coordinates: 42°59′36″N 12°40′16″E

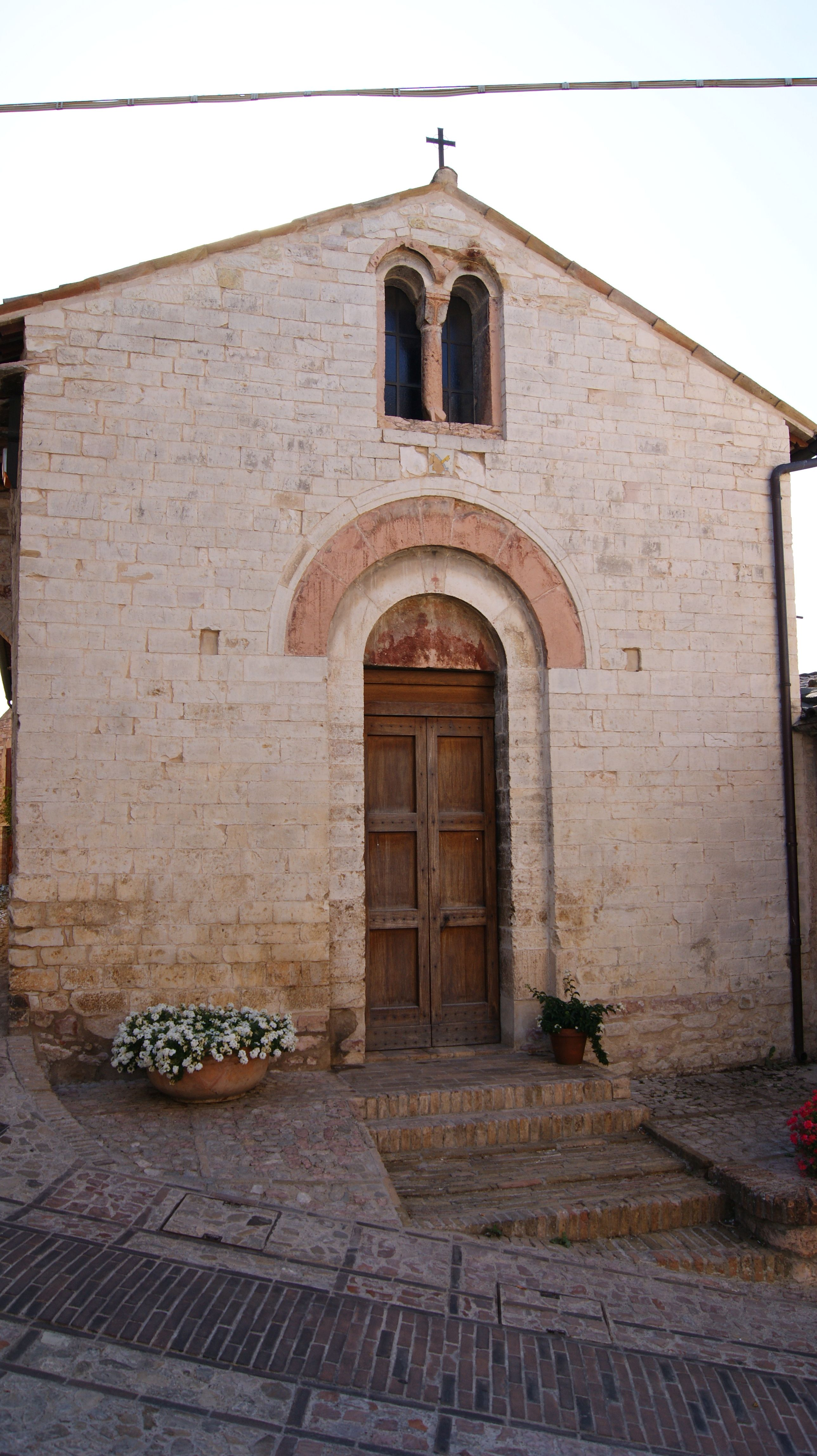
Facade of San Martino

San Martino is a 12th-century Roman Catholic church located in the terziere of Pusterula in the town of Spello, in the province of Perugia, region of Umbria, Italy.

== History ==
Documents allude to the founding of the church in the 11th-12th centuries. The church is dedicated to St Martin, Bishop of Tours. The first contemporary documentation we have for this church, however dates to 1333; in the next century it was subsumed to the local church of San Lorenzo, but in 1561, it fell under the direct jurisdiction of the Papal government.

In the 19th century, priests dedicated to the cult of the Vergine Addolorata were installed. In 1870, this institution was suppressed and the church was transferred to a confraternity known as the Congregazione di Carità di Spello.

The church has a simple layout with Romanesque elements. The simple facade in white stone has a sail-shape bell-casing in the tympanum. Below the bell is a mullioned window and an arched portal. All the original canvases have been dispersed. Presently it has an altarpiece of the Madonna of the Poor (1988) by Orlando Tisato. On the left wall are remains of 15th century frescoes depicting St Martin granting his cloak to the poor and a St Sebastian. There is a wooden sculpture of Ecce Homo from the 17th-century.
