= Filippo Rusuti =

Italian painter

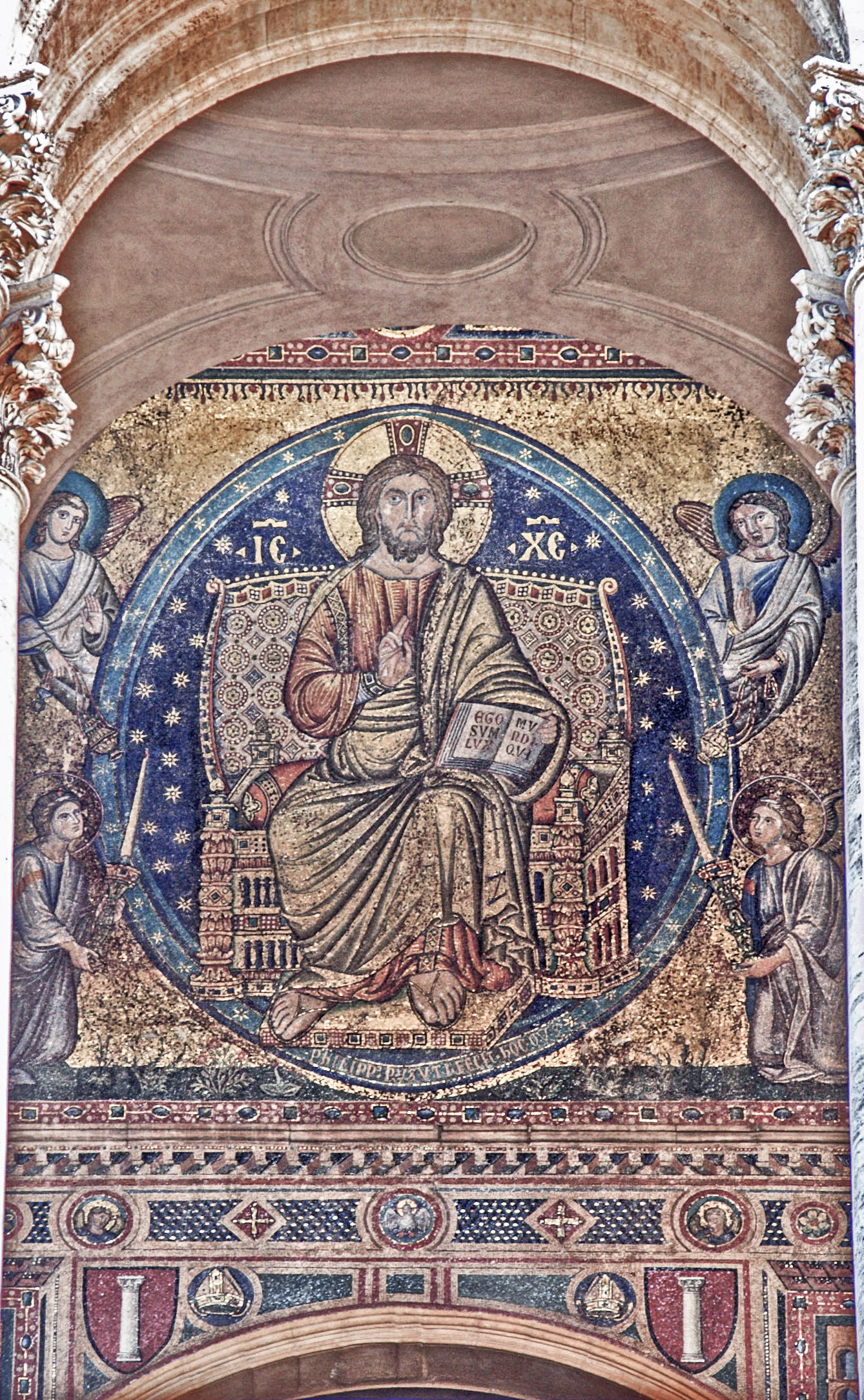
Christ in Glory by Filippo Rusuti, mosaic on the frontside of Basilica di Santa Maria Maggiore, Rome

Filippo Rusuti, (c. 1255–c. 1325) was an Italian painter, active in Rome between 1288 and 1297, and in Naples around 1320.

Rusuti belonged, along with Jacopo Torriti and Pietro Cavallini, to the so-called Roman school active in the late thirteenth century. Early in his career he worked on the fresco decoration of the Upper Basilica of San Francesco d'Assisi, perhaps alongside or after Torriti. The work included some parts of the story of Genesis, in particular the creation of Adam and Eve and perhaps the construction of Noah's Ark.

His only signed work is the upper register of the mosaic decoration of the old facade of the Roman church of Santa Maria Maggiore, where the presence of Cardinal Pietro Colonna allows dating of the mosaic between 1288 and 1297. Art historians believe that the lower register of the same mosaic, with the stories of the founding of the Santa Maria Liberiana, is to be considered an intervention a few years later by the followers of Rusuti based on his drawings.

It was rebuilt for the presence of Rusuti (with his son John) in Poitiers, on the basis of a more careful reading of documents (now lost) which attest to a Filippus Bizuti or rather Ruzuti in 1309, in 1316–17, in the service of the king of France, but perhaps also in the wake of a column at the papal court in Avignon.

Around 1319 Rusuti went to Naples at the Angevins court following Cavallini for the fresco decoration of the church of Santa Maria Donna Regina Vecchia, where his figures are probably the Prophets. Still in Naples, around 1320 he created some scenes from the Life of Christ in the Brancacci Chapel.

In early June 2010, the artist and scholar Alfred Breitman attributed frescoes discovered in a tower of the palace Senate in the Capitol to Filippo Rusuti, with the consensus of historians of ancient art.

In 2018, it was announced that the icon of Santa Maria del Popolo was a work of Rusuti, whose signature was discovered on the image during restoration.
