= Clement Bible =

Deluxe illustrated manuscript of the Vulgate Bible

Final illustration at the end of Revelation, showing the New Jerusalem

Frontispiece (showing Clement's arms) and titlepage, added in the 16th century

The Clement Bible (London, British Library, Add MS 47672) is a deluxe illustrated manuscript of the Vulgate Bible produced in Naples around 1330. It is a pandect (complete bible).

The Clement Bible is named after Antipope Clement VII, whose coat-of-arms appears 28 times in the manuscript as a mark of ownership, but who was not the original owner. The bible was probably commissioned by Raymond de Gramat, bishop of Monte Cassino. It was acquired by Pope Benedict XII on the death of Gramat in 1340. In the inventory of Gramat's library, it is referred to as a biblia pulcra (beautiful bible). In 1341, it was sent to the library of the Palais des Papes in Avignon. After his election in 1378, Clement VII had the original coats-of-arms replaced by his own. Prior to its acquisition by the British Library, it was in the private library of Holkham Hall (as ms. 7).

The bible is a codex measuring 360 by 245 millimetres (14.2 in × 9.6 in) and 6 inches (150 mm) thick. It contains 507 folios. Every folio contains "decorations in the finest style, distinguished for their delicate execution and brilliant colouring". Each book of the bible begins with a historiated initial and framed miniatures at the bottom of the page. There are longer series of miniatures in the books of Daniel, Matthew, Mark, Luke, John, Acts and Revelation. The total number of bottom-of-the-page illustrations is over 250. The illustrations are in the style of Pietro Cavallini and may be his work or that of his workshop. He was active in Naples after 1308 and well connected to the court of King Robert the Wise. The frontispiece and title page were added in the 16th century.

== Bibliography ==
- Fleck, Cathleen A. (2006). "When a Bible is Not a Bible: The Meaning and Movement of the Bible of Anti-Pope Clement VII (British Library, ms. Add. 47672)". Word & Image. 22 (3): 219–227. doi:10.1080/02666286.2006.10435750. S2CID 163174599.
- Fleck, Cathleen A. (2010). The Clement Bible at the Medieval Courts of Naples and Avignon: A Story of Papal Power, Royal Prestige, and Patronage. Routledge.
- Skeat, T. C. (1952). "Manuscripts and Printed Books from the Holkham Hall Library: The Manuscripts". The British Museum Quarterly. 17 (2): 25–33. doi:10.2307/4422374. JSTOR 4422374.
