= Riccardo Petroni =

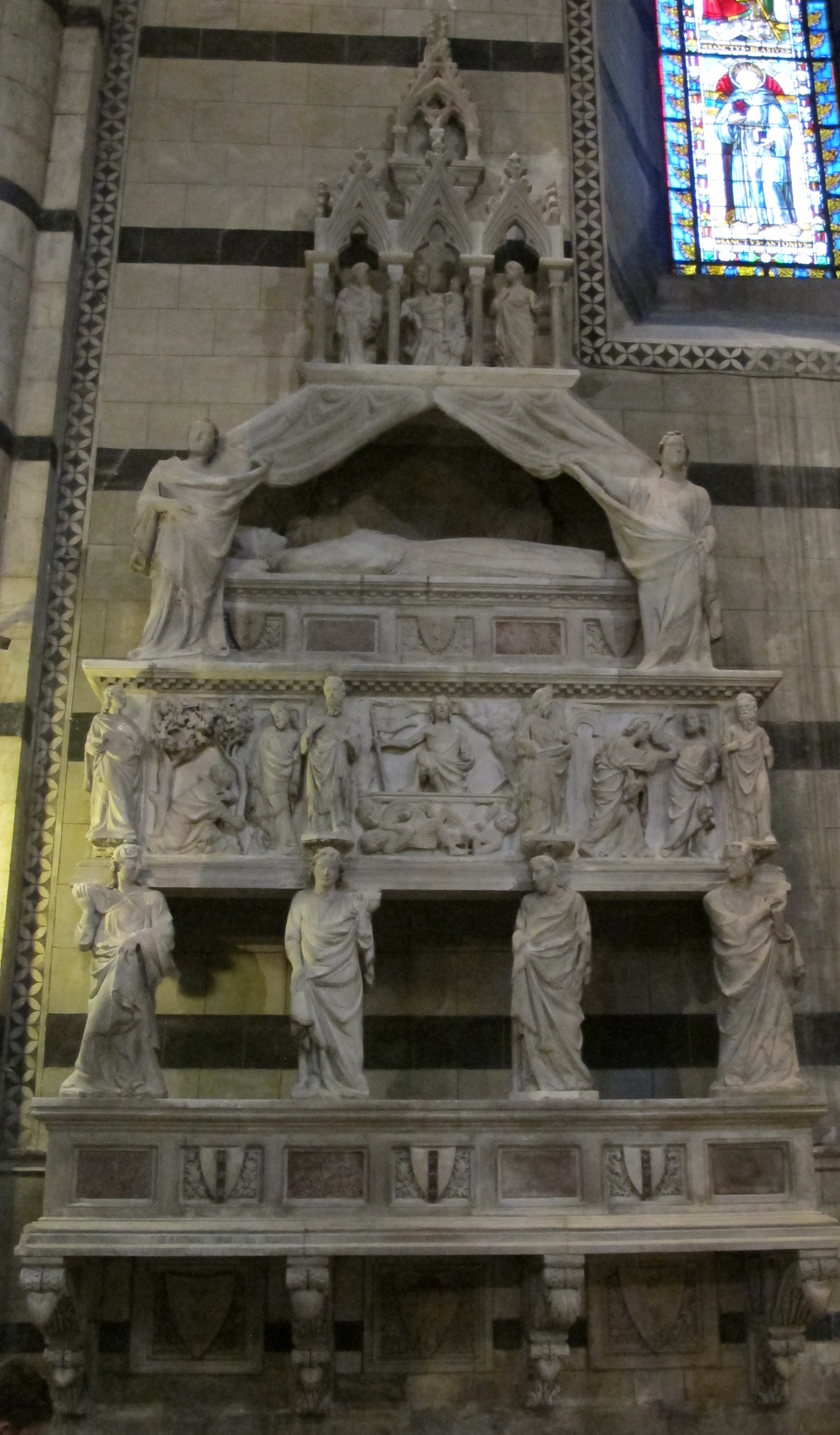
Tomb of Riccardo Petroni in Siena Cathedral by Tino di Camaino (ca. 1317)

Riccardo Petroni (born Siena ca 1250 – died Genoa 10 February 1314) was a senior cardinal in the Roman Catholic Church during the closing decades of the thirteenth century and the early years of the fourteenth century.

== Biography ==
Petroni studied at Bologna. Later, he taught at Naples. Between 1296 and 1300, he was Vice-Chancellor of the Holy Roman Church.

A distinguished jurist, he collaborated on the Sextus Liber Decretalium, which was promulgated in 1299 by Pope Boniface VIII. The “Sextus Liber” was intended as a follow-up to the better remembered Decretals (in five books) of Gregory IX.

Pope Boniface VIII created Petroni a cardinal at the consistory of 1298, when the latter became Cardinal-Deacon of the church of Sant'Eustachio in Rome.

He participated in the conclave of 1304-1305, which would result in the election of Pope Clement V, but Petroni himself was forced by illness to leave the conclave before it concluded. He nevertheless attended the Council of Vienne in 1311 and towards the end of his life was the papal legate to Genoa.

After he died in February of 1314, his mortal remains were transferred three years later to Siena, where Tino di Camaino was commissioned to build a monumental tomb for him, initially set up in the north transept of Santa Maria Assunta (but moved several times).

Riccardo Petroni was responsible for various buildings and monuments in his home city of Siena along with a Carthusian monastery.

== See also ==
- Cardinals created by Boniface VIII
