= Pietro Cavallini =

Italian painter

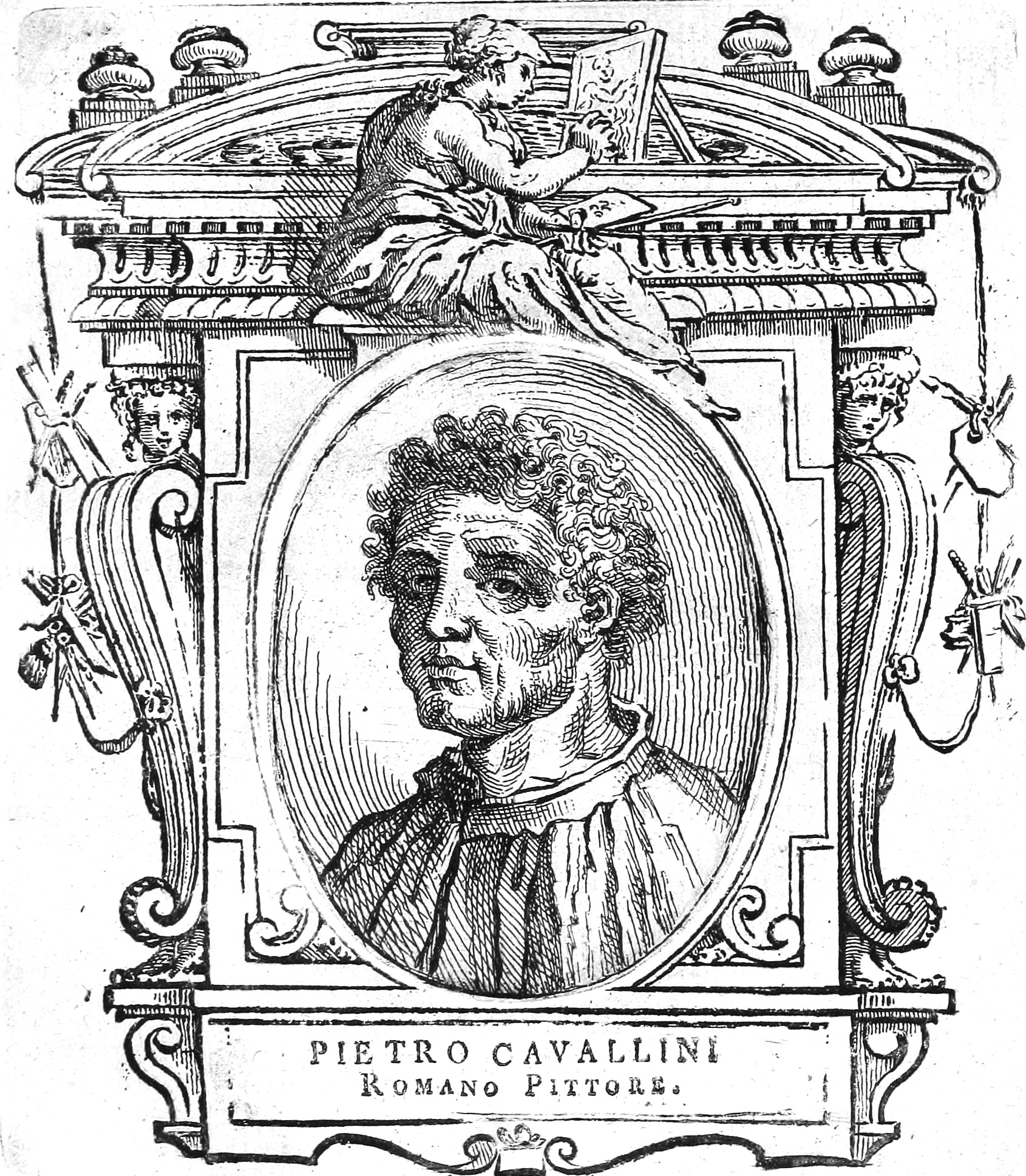
- Engraving of Pietro Cavallini from Le vite de' più eccellenti pittori, scultori e architetti (1767)
- Born: c. 1240; Rome, Papal States (now Italy)
- Died: c. 1330; Rome, Papal States (now Italy)
- Notable work: Last Judgment, Santa Cecilia in Trastevere; mosaics in Santa Maria in Trastevere

Pietro Cavallini (c. 1240 – c. 1330) was an Italian artist active during the late Middle Ages. His most famous surviving works include the Last Judgment fresco at Santa Cecilia in Trastevere, the Life of the Virgin Mary mosaic cycle at Santa Maria in Trastevere, and several frescos in San Domenico Maggiore. Despite his prolific career, much of Cavallini’s oeuvre has been lost and is known today, albeit tentatively, only through fragments, written descriptions, or stylistic attributions.

== Biography ==
Very little is known about Pietro Cavallini's early life, but a legal document from 1273 in the archives of Santa Maria Maggiore is considered by scholars to be the first place where the artist is named: "Petrus dictus Cavallinus de Cerronibus." Thirty-five years later, a contract referring to "Magister Petrus Cavallinus de Roma pictor" was drafted, stipulating that the artist was to receive 30 ounces of gold, a house, and an annual pension from the King of Naples, likely Charles II of Naples. While these documents reveal little about Cavalliin's biography, art historian Paul Hetherington that they attest to a highly respected artist who lived and worked primarily in Rome but was esteemed enough to attract the patronage of the Neopolitan court.

Much of what is known about Cavallini's artistic output comes from the Lorenzo Ghiberti's Commentaries, written nearly a century after the artist's death. The Florentine sculptor provides what he considered to be a praiseworthy list of works and affirms that Cavallini was regarded as exceptionally skilled artist in his own time.

His first notable works were the fresco cycles for the Basilica di San Paolo fuori le Mura, with stories from the New and Old Testament (1277–1285). They were destroyed by the fire of 1823.

His Last Judgment in the Church of Santa Cecilia in Trastevere in Rome, painted c. 1293 and considered Cavallini's masterwork, demonstrates an artistic style known as Roman naturalism. This naturalism influenced the work of artists working in other Italian cities such as Florence and Siena.

In the Sienese school, the influence of classical Roman forms combined with the Byzantine artistic heritage of the region and with northern Gothic influences to form a naturalized painting style that was one of the origins of International Gothic.

In Florence, the influence of classical Roman forms combined with the Byzantine artistic heritage of the region to spark an interest in volumetric, naturalistic paintings and statuary. This work is in stark contrast to the comparatively flat and ornamented Gothic, International Gothic, and Byzantine styles.

This naturalism is also evident in the Basilica of San Francesco d'Assisi in Assisi, built in the early years of the 13th century in honour of the newly canonized St. Francis. As the shrine was commissioned by the Roman church, its interior is painted in the Roman tradition. The identities of the artists at work in this church are for the most part not known but at least one team of artists came from Rome. Owing to the similarity of the work in San Francesco to that of Florentine artist Giotto, he was traditionally credited with some of the frescoes, although most scholars no longer believe he was involved.

Giotto's work in the Arena Chapel (also known as the Scrovegni Chapel) at Padua strongly shows the influence of stylized Roman naturalism in a newly individualized style which would come to characterize the work of Florentine Renaissance artists.

From 1308 Cavallini worked in Naples at the court of King Charles II of Anjou, notably in the churches of San Domenico Maggiore (1308) and Santa Maria Donnaregina (1317), together with his fellow Roman Filippo Rusuti. He returned to Rome before 1325, beginning the external decoration of the Basilica di San Paolo fuori le Mura in 1321, with a series of Byzantine-style mosaics.

Cavallini's pupils included Giovanni di Bartolommeo.

== Works ==
His works include:

- Life of the Virgin mary (c. 1298), mosaic cycle at the apse of Basilica di Santa Maria in Trastevere in Rome. The six scenes were made by the order of Bertoldo Stefaneschi, brother of Cardinal Giacomo Gaetani Stefaneschi, and include a donor portrait of him. These mosaics are praised for their realistic portrayal and attempts at perspective.
Life of the Virgin Mary mosaics by Pietro Cavallini in Santa Maria in Trastevere

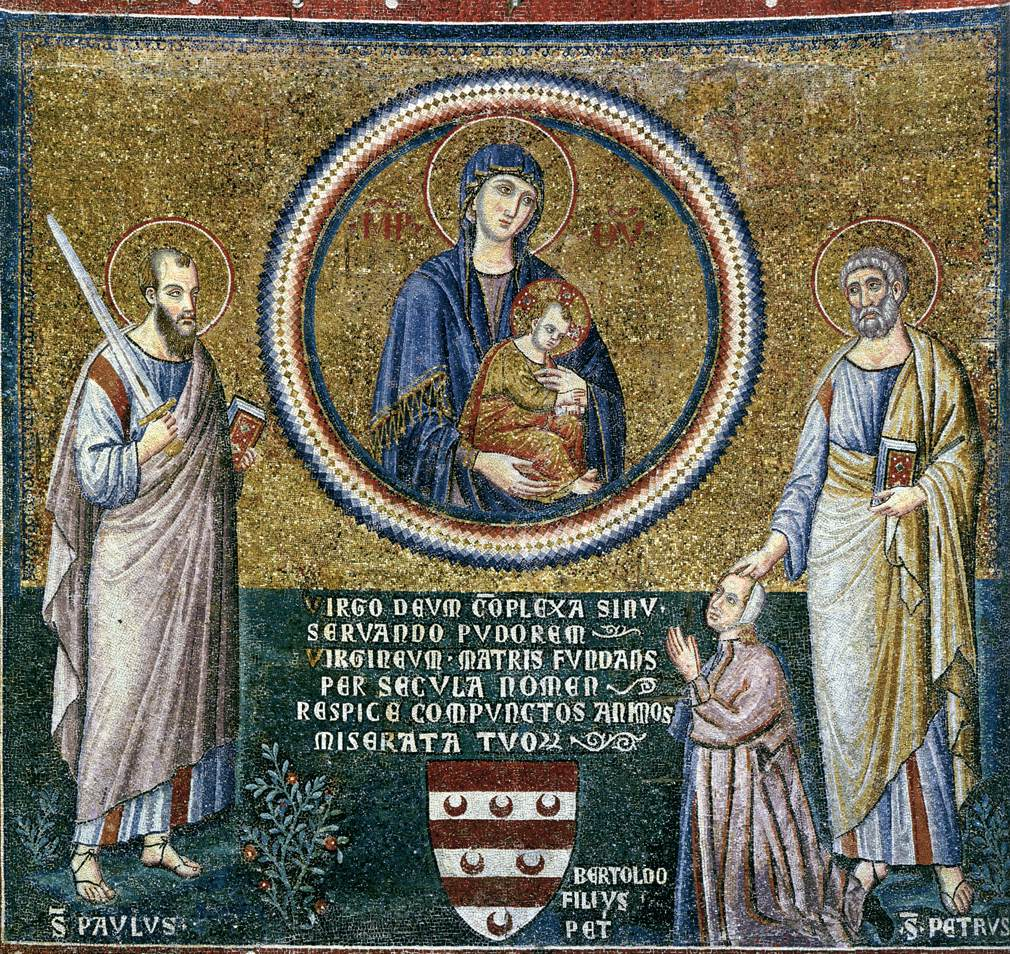
Virgin Mary, Saints Peter and Paul, and the donor Bertoldo Stefaneschi

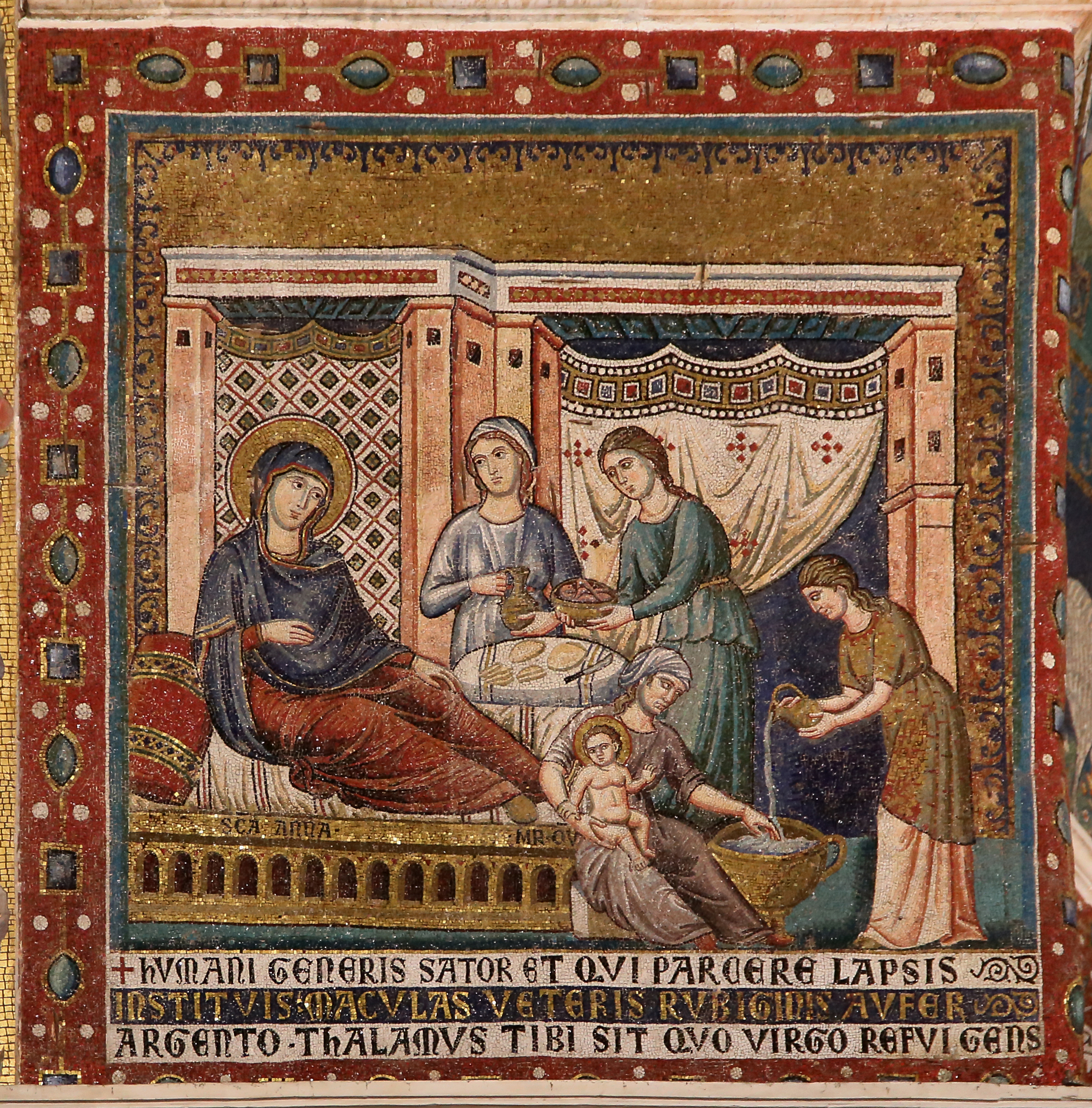
Nativity of Mary

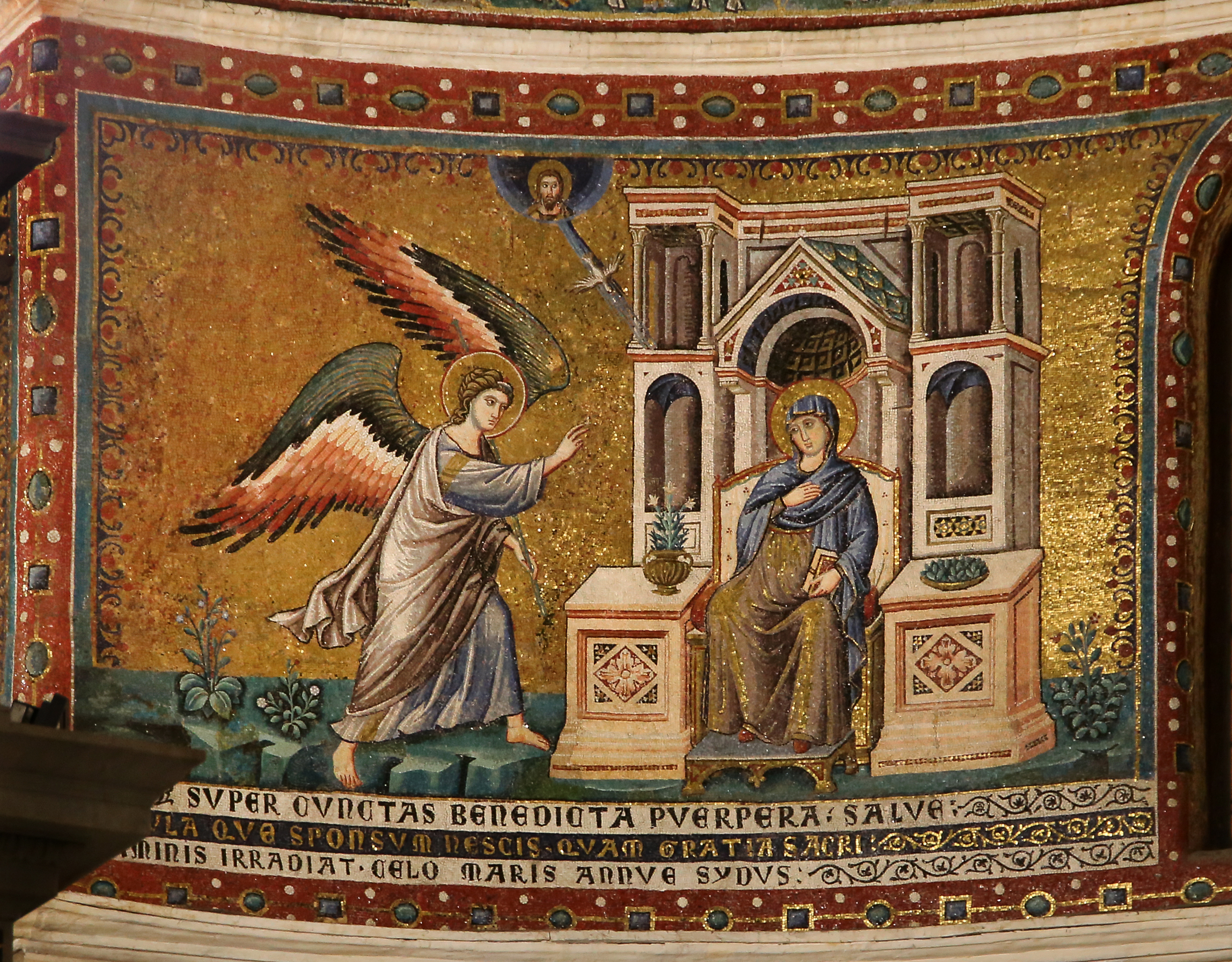
Annunciation

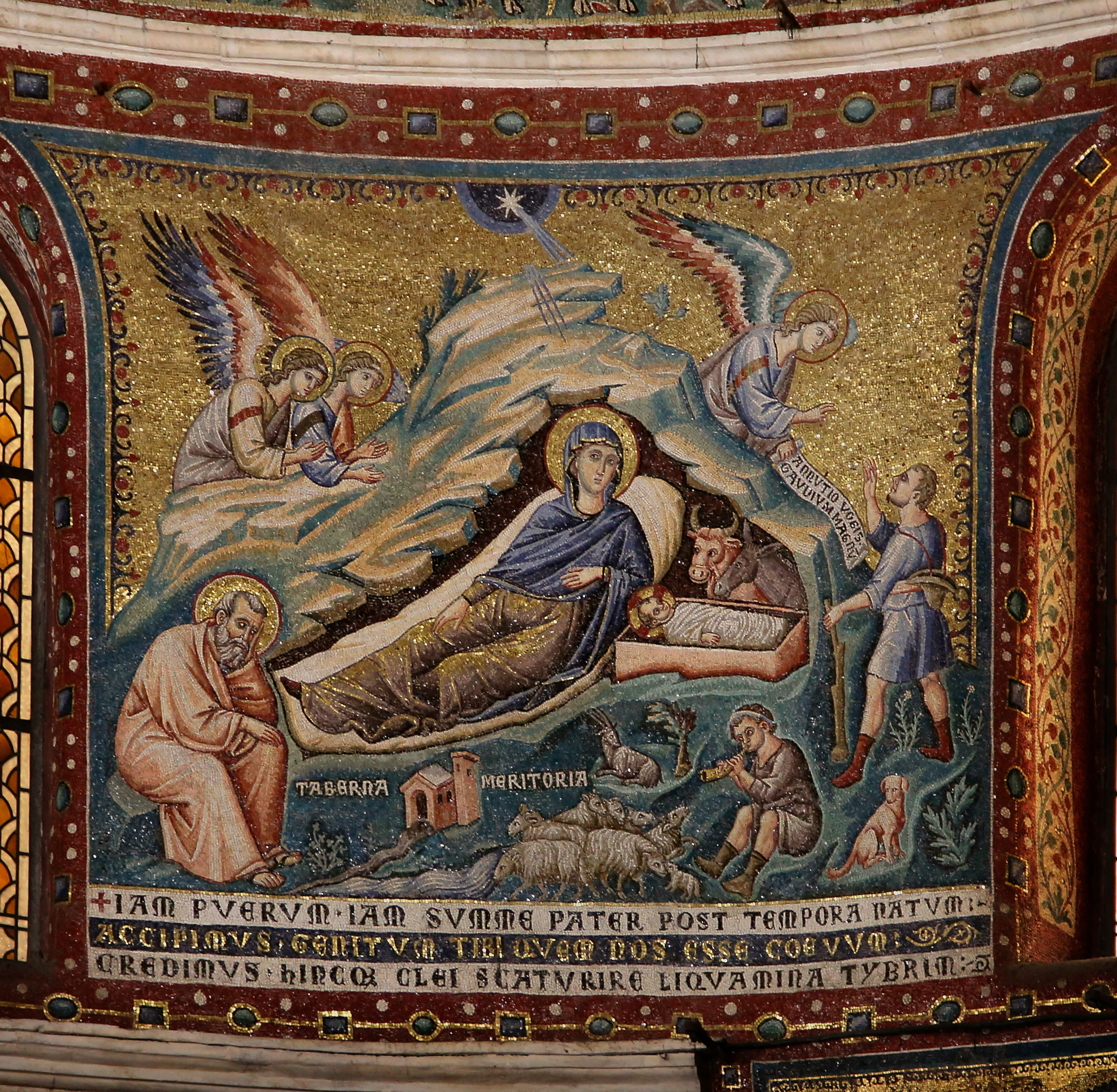
Nativity of Jesus

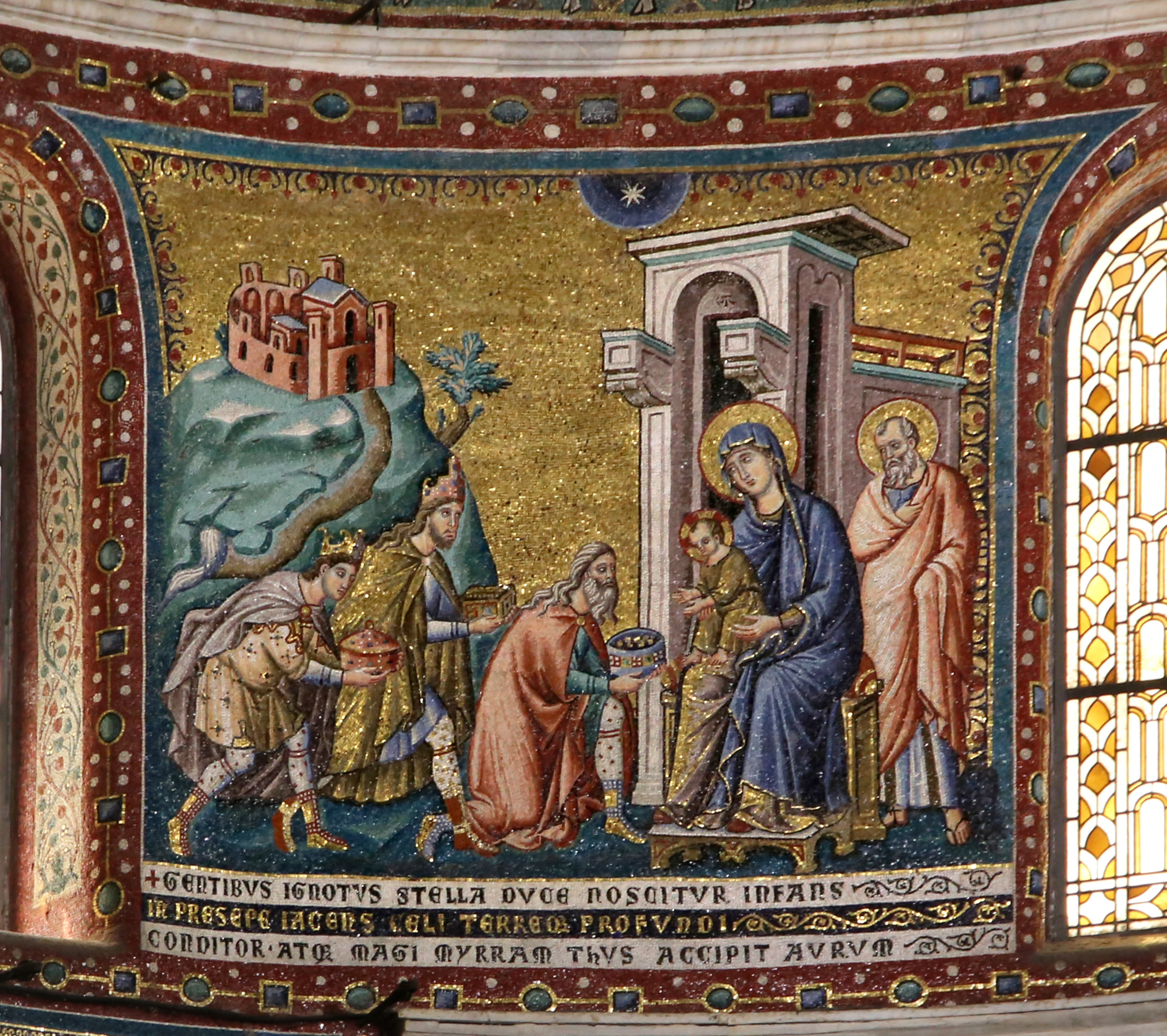
Adoration of the Magi

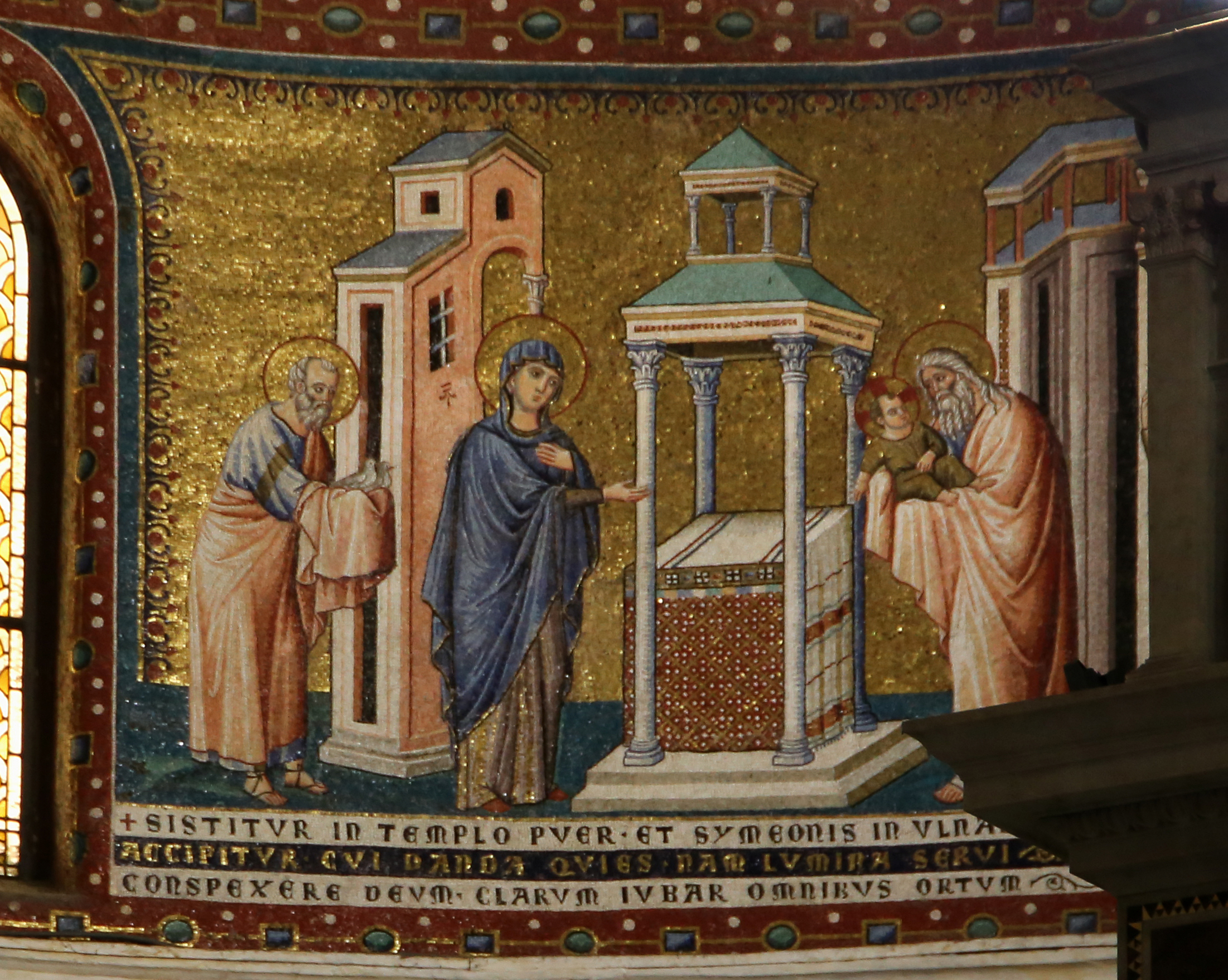
Presentation of Jesus

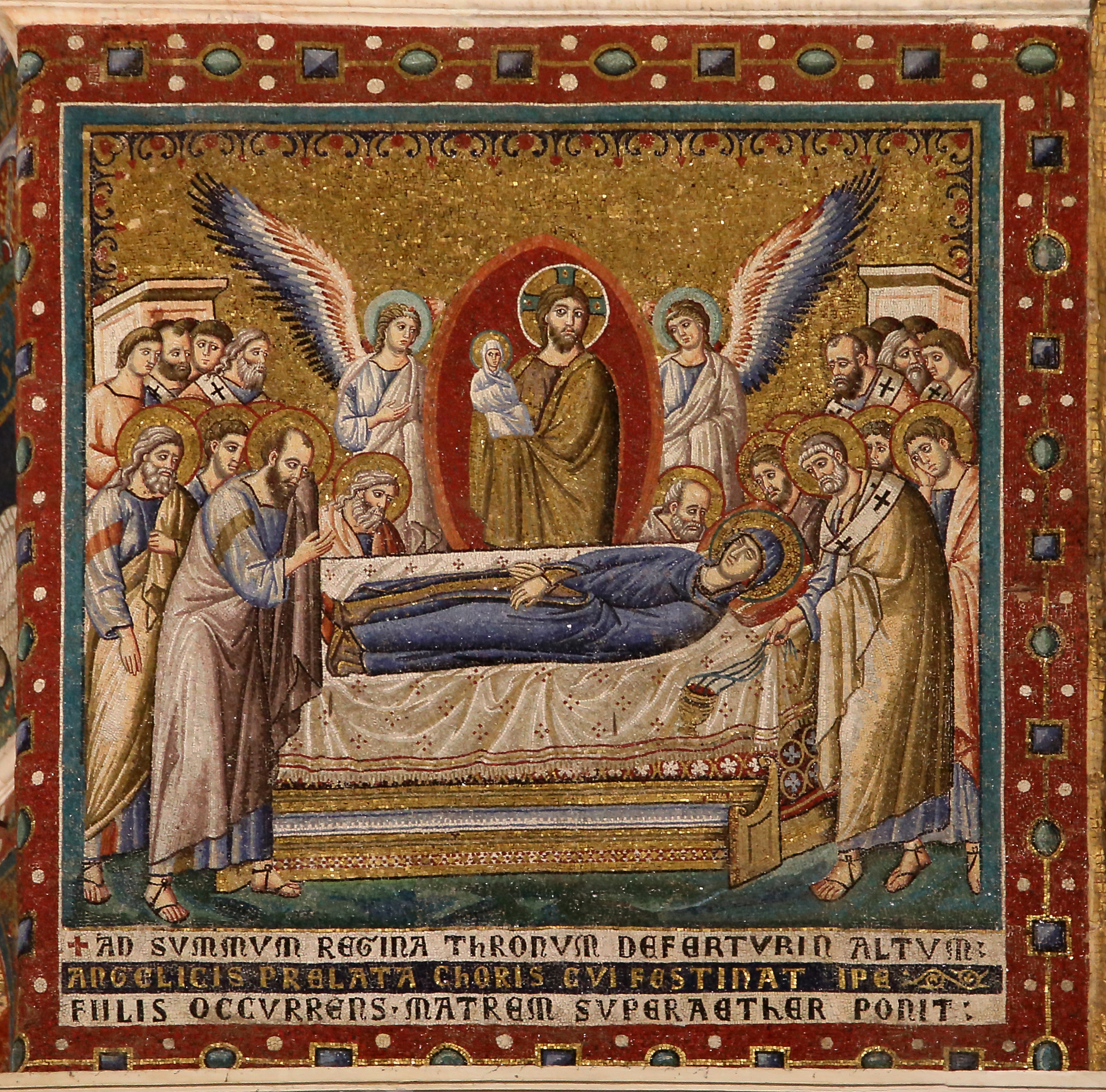
Death of the Virgin Mary
- The Last Judgment (1295–1298), part of fresco cycle at Santa Cecilia in Trastevere in Rome.
- The apse paintings at San Giorgio al Velabro, Rome, have been attributed to him on the basis of stylistic similarity to the Trastevere paintings.
- The apse mosaic of the San Crisogono church in the Trastevere district, depicting the Mary with Sts. Sebastian and Chrysogonos, is also attributed to Cavallini.
- The illustrated Clement Bible has been attributed to Cavallini or his workshop.

== Sources ==
- Hermanin, Federico. Affreschi di Pietro Cavallini a Santa Cecilia in Trastevere. Ministero dell'Istruzione Pubblica, 1902. (In Italian)
- Hetherington, Paul. Pietro Cavallini: A study in the art of late medieval Rome. Sagittarius Press, 1979.
- Jullian, René. "Arnolfo di Cambio et Pietro Cavallini." Gazette des beaux-arts 53 (1959): 357-371.
- Lavagnino, Emilio. Pietro Cavallini. Fratelli Palombi, 1953. (In Italian)
- Matthiae, Guglielmo. Pietro Cavallini. De Luca, 1972. (In Italian)
- Monciatti, Alessio. L'arte nel Duecento. Giulio Einaudi editore, 2013. (In Italian)
- Parronchi, Alessandro. Cavallini: "Discepolo di Giotto." Edizioni Polistampa, 1994. (In Italian)
- Romano, Serena. Eclissi di Roma: Pittura murale a Roma e nel Lazio da Bonifacio VIII a Martino V (1295-1431). Argos, 1992. (In Italian)
- Schmitz, Michael. Pietro Cavallini in Santa Cecilia in Trastevere: ein Beitrag zur römischen Malerei des Due- und Trecento. Hirmer, 2013. (In German)
- Sindona, Enio. Pietro Cavallini. Instituto editoriale italiano, 1958. (In Italian)
- Strinati, Tomasso and Angelo Tartuferi (eds.) Dipinti romani: Tra Giotto e Cavallini. Electa, 2004. (In Italian)
- Toesca, Pietro. Pietro Cavallini. McGraw-Hill, 1961.
- Tomei, Alessandro. Pietro Cavallini. Silvana editoriale, 2000. (In Italian)
- Zanardi, Bruno. Giotto e Pietro Cavallini: La questione di Assisi e il cantiere medievale di pittura a fresco. Skira, 2002.
