= Santa Maria Donna Regina Vecchia =

Church in Naples, Italy

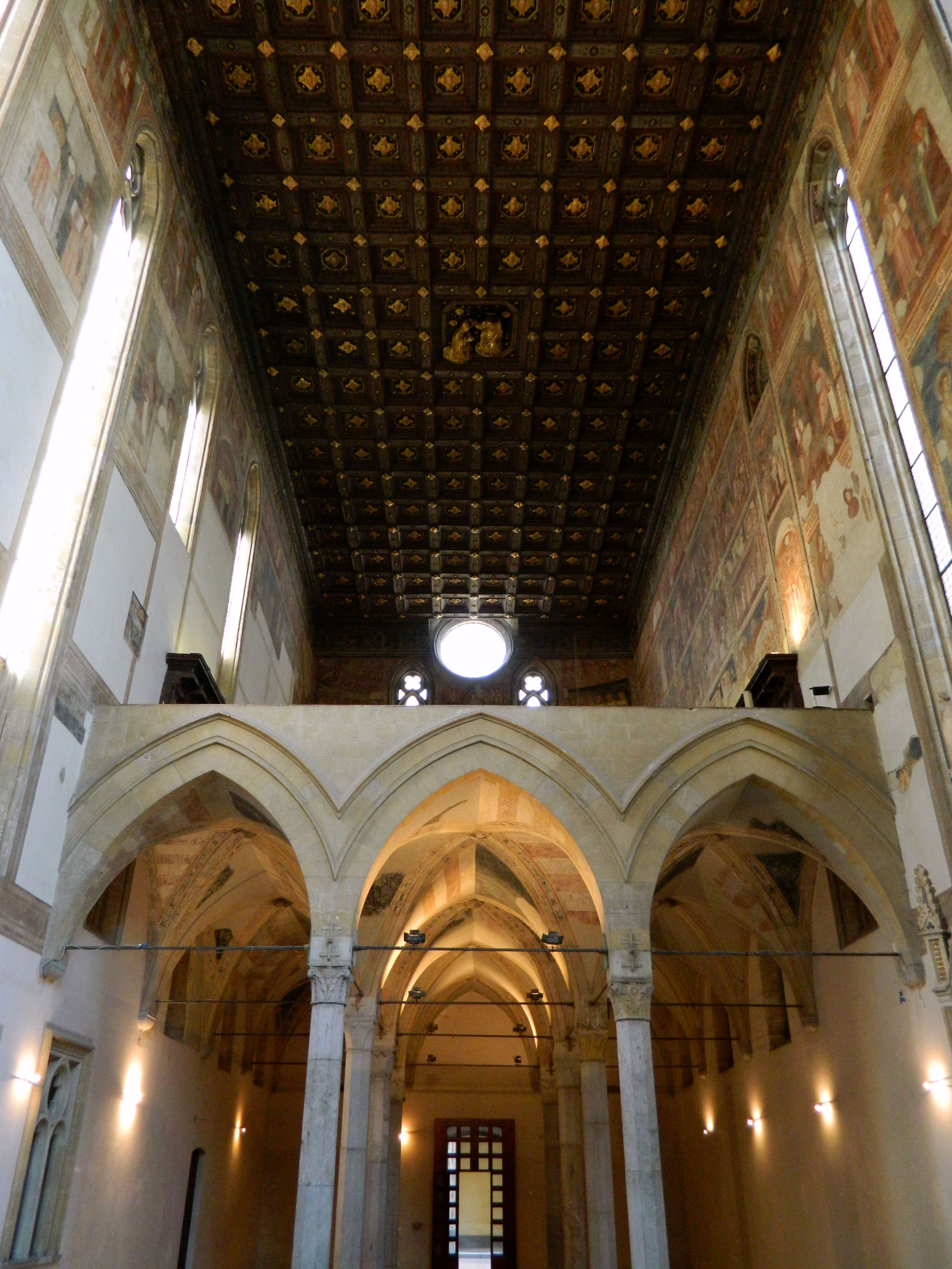
A view of the interior of the church.

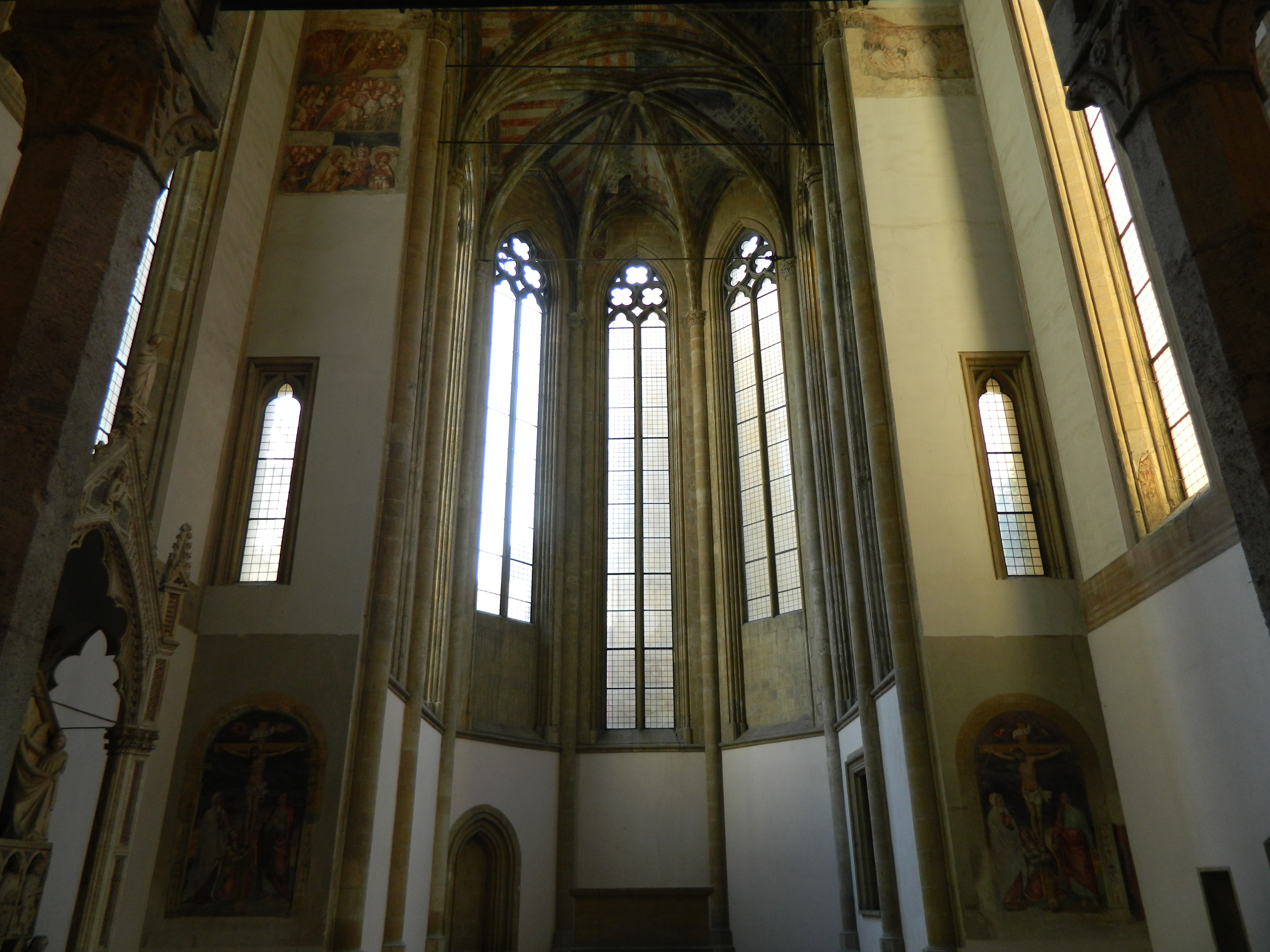
Apse.

Santa Donna Regina Vecchia is a church in Naples, in southern Italy. It is called Vecchia ("old") to distinguish it from the newer and adjacent church of Santa Maria Donna Regina Nuova.

The earliest mention of a church on this site is from the year 780 in a reference to the nuns of the church of San Pietro del Monte di Donna Regina. At that time, the church was quite near the old eastern city wall. The nuns were of the Basilian order and, when that order left Naples in the beginning of the 9th century, took Benedictine vows. In 1264, Pope Gregory IX gave the nuns permission to join the Franciscan order.

In 1293 a severe earthquake caused great damage to the original structure, and queen Mary of Hungary, consort of the king of Naples, Charles II of Anjou financed the construction of a new complex in Gotico Angioino style adjacent to the old one. The newer complex is known as Santa Maria Donna Regina Nuova.

== Overview ==
Like San Lorenzo Maggiore, the other Franciscan foundation in Naples, Donna Regina is built in the Italian variant of the French Gothic style favored by the mendicant orders in the 13th and 14th century, with pointed arches, window tracery, and a faceted apse, all surmounted by a trussed, wooden roof. In the left nave aisle is the tomb of Mary of Hungary, commissioned by her son, Robert I of Anjou, after her death on 25 March 1323. The elaborate Gothic monument is the work of Sienese sculptor and stonemason Tino da Camaino and an unknown Neapolitan artist. Tino worked for the Angevin court between 1324 and his death in 1337; the tomb presumably dates from the mid-1320s. In its structure and sculptural program, Mary's tomb resembles Tino's funerary monuments in Tuscany. Angels draw back curtains to reveal the gisant figure of the Queen, who is clad in the habit of a Poor Clare, or Franciscan nun, recalling her long-standing financial support of the convent and underscoring her efforts to emulate mendicant spirituality in general. The niche figures on the sarcophagus represent Mary's sons Charles Martel, Louis of Toulouse and Robert himself.

Also notable are the 14th-century frescoes by Pietro Cavallini (along with his workshop, or some of his followers) and Filippo Rusuti, one of the most important pieces of paintings from that century in Naples. They were executed between 1307 and 1320 and depict, on two levels, stories of life of Christ and the Apostles. In the lower level are 17 episodes of Jesus, 5 of St. Elizabeth and four of St. Clare, paired to a Last Judgement, the latter certainly attributable to Cavallini. In the upper one are six scenes of St. Agnes. From the same period, but by unknown artists, are the Crucifixion frescoes on the left wall and the Annunciation on the wall facing the entrance.

The triumphal arch of the apse has two frescoes with the Crucifixion; the apse has remains of majolica-covered pavement from a Neapolitan workshop of the Angevin era (late 14th-early 15th century). Also present is a Martyrdom of St. Ursula attributed to Francesco da Tolentino (1520).

== Sources ==
- Bologna, Ferdinando (1969). I pittori alla corte angioina di Napoli (1266-1414). Rome.
- Carelli, E.; Casiello, S. (1975). Santa Maria di Donnaregina a Napoli. Naples.
