= Tino di Camaino =

Italian sculptor (c. 1280–c. 1337)

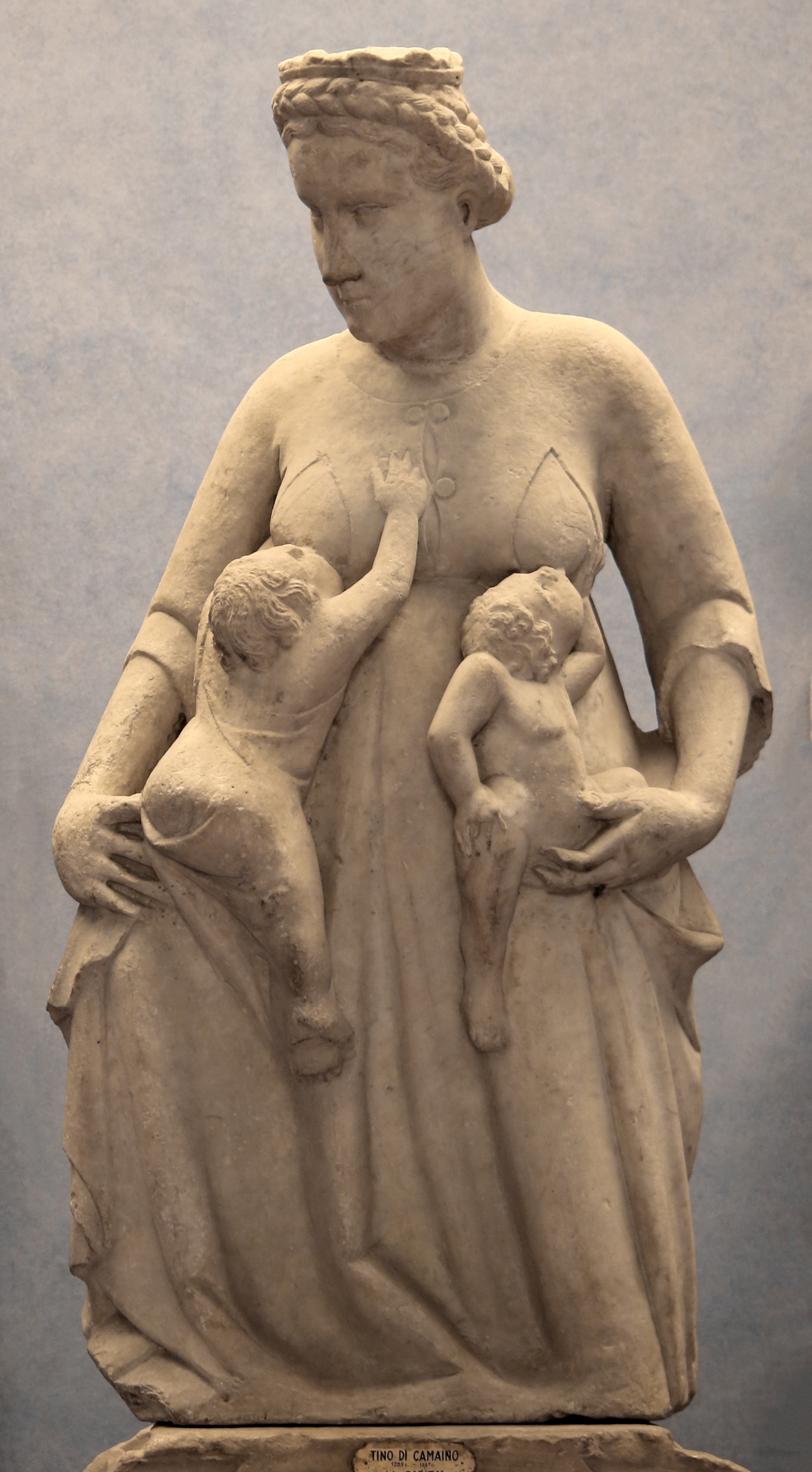
Carità, ca. 1320–24, Museo Bardini, Florence

Tino di Camaino (c. 1280 in Siena – c. 1337 in Naples) was an Italian sculptor stylistically succeeding Giovanni Pisano. He is primarily known for his funerary monuments in Pisa, Siena, Florence and Naples.

== Biography ==
Born in Siena, the son of architect Camaino di Crescentino, with whom he is documented to have worked with at Siena Cathedral in 1318 (him being almost 40 years old). He was a pupil of Giovanni Pisano, when the façade of the Cathedral of Siena was in progress. Later Tino followed his master to Pisa, where his first known commission he executed by himself was the altarpiece for the pisan patron saint Rainerius around 1305. The altar was originally placed in the Cathedral at the front wall of the right transept. Probably when it became out of fashion, it was moved to the Camposanto, before the Cathedral Museum was founded. For the Pulpit of Sant' Andrea in Pistoia, which Giovanni completed in 1301, Tino "contributed creatively" to the relief panel of The Three Magi.

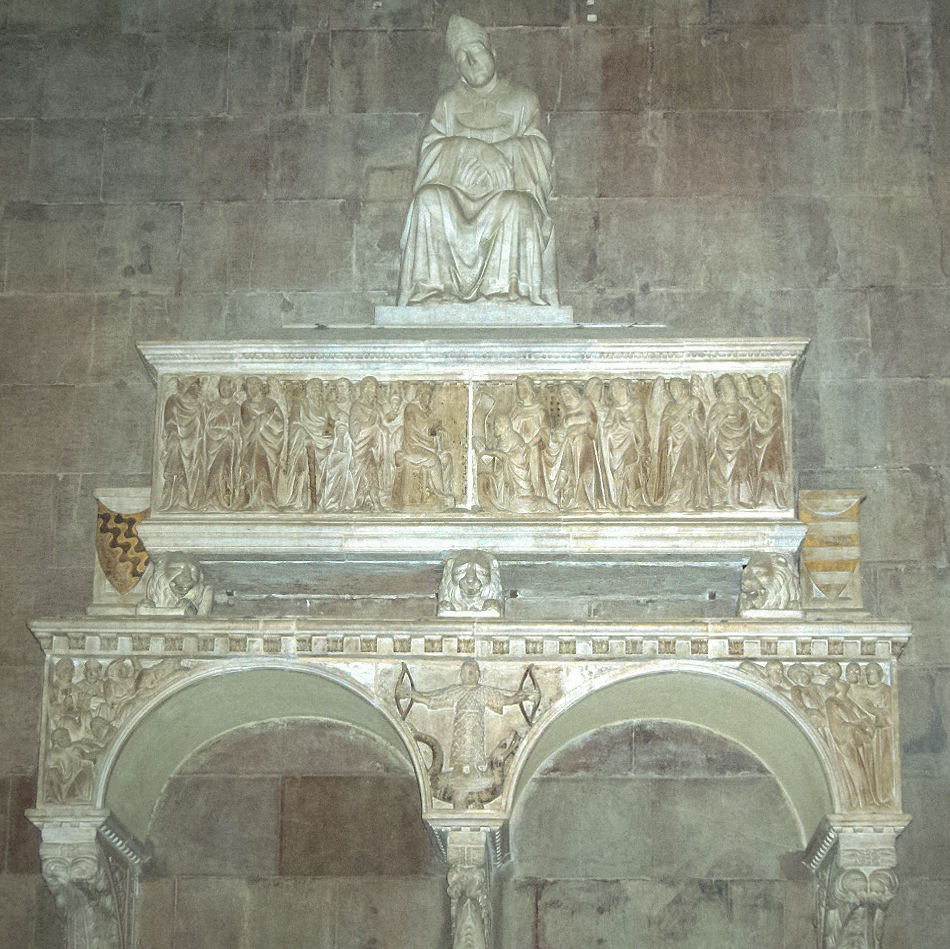
Funerary monument of Bishop Antonio d'Orso, 1323, Florence Cathedral

In 1311–12 he built a font for the cathedral with reliefs of the Life of Saint John; only three small fragments are left, now in the Museum Civico. When Giovanni Pisano died in 1914, Tino succeeded him as capomaestro of the cathedral works. In this position he was assigned to build the funerary monument of Emperor Henry VII (Arrigo VII in Italian). In less than six months, Tino and the Cathedral workshop must have executed most of it, since in July 1315 a receipt documents his almost full payment (375 out of 400 lire). The original appearance of the monument is unknown, as it was removed from the apse of the cathedral's choir in 1494 and disassembled, after it had become statically unstable; a part of it was reinstalled in the chapel of Saint Rainerius in the north transept, the rest of it was placed in the Camposanto (like the Rainerius altar), until it entered the Cathedral Museum. The commission of February 1315 probably entailed also an otherwise documented altare dell'imperatore consecrated to St. Bartholomew, which was placed in a small distance in front of the funerary monument of Henry VII. It comprised a statuette of the saint worked out in the round, of which only the torso survived, figures of the Evangelists each attached to a pier, and an unfinished Virgin and Child. The work was not completed due to the fact that Tino left Pisa in July soon after he got paid. It may be, that this was politically motivated, since Pisa was ruled by Guelphs, allied to the Holy Roman Emperor (the Bavarian Louis IV succeeded Henry VII), while Tino returned to Siena, loyal to the Pope.

Tino executed several similar monumental tombs in Siena and Florence, including the funerary monument for Cardinal Riccardo Petroni (1314) in Siena Cathedral, and the monumental tomb of Bishop Antonio d'Orso (1323) at Santa Maria del Fiore, whose seated (rather than lying) figure John Pope-Hennessy highlights as one of the most memorable sights of the 14th century. For the condottiere and former Archbishop of Milan Gastone della Torre who died in 1318 on a trip falling from his horse in Florence, Tino created a monumental tomb in Santa Croce. For the Florence Baptistery he executed between around 1320 and 1324 two sculptural groups that were placed above its doors: for the south door a Baptism of Christ of which the upper half of the Christ Blessing and the head of the Baptist survived, while the three Theological Virtues for the east portal are in a similar state (see below).

From 1323 he worked in Naples, under King Robert of Anjou. Again he realized several funerary monuments, including those of Catherine of Austria, Duchess of Calabria (1324) in San Lorenzo Maggiore, Marie of Valois, Duchess of Calabria (Santa Chiara, 1331), and Mary, Queen of Hungary in Santa Maria Donnaregina (ca. 1335). Other works are to be found in the church of La Trinità della Cava in Tirreni. the Victoria and Albert Museum in London, and the National Gallery of Art in Washington, among others. Tino di Camaino died in Naples around 1337.

== Reception ==
Called by Gerd Kreytenberg one of the most important masters of the 14. century, Tino di Camaino was long forgotten and only rediscovered early in the 19th century. Giorgio Vasari had mentioned him in the Vita of Giovanni Pisano in the second edition of his Lives of the Most Excellent Painters, Sculptors, and Architects:

There were as disciples of Giovanni many who flourished after him, but in particular Lino, sculptor and architect of Siena, who made in the Duomo of Pisa the chapel all adorned with marble wherein is the body of San Ranieri, and likewise the baptismal font that is in the said Duomo, with his name.

— Giorgio Vasari, 1568

But since the quoted works were disassembled and removed from their original locations, his legacy got lost. In 1810 a receipt from July 1315 for the monument of Henry VII was found, and in 1842 his signature was rediscovered on the west wall of Florence Cathedral, where it became clear the tomb of bishop Antonio d'Orso originally stood, before it was moved elsewhere in the cathedral already in 1380. In 1850 it could be proven that in 1322 he had worked on Pisa Baptistery, and in 1854 two documents of payments from 1318 to Tino and his father Camaino were discovered in the archives of Siena Cathedral. And finally in 1863 the funerary monument of Cardinal Riccardo Petroni could be attributed to Tino, that was sufficient to at least outline his œuvre with these major works secured.

== List of works ==
All works by Tino di Camaino and his workshop were executed in marble.

=== In original locations ===
- Funerary monument of Henry VII, sarcophagus with effigy and base (fragment), 1313, apse of Pisa Cathedral, sarcophagus: 223 cm, original total width: ≥350 cm (see also Museo dell'Opera del Duomo, Pisa)
- Funerary monument of Cardinal Riccardo Petroni, 1314, Siena Cathedral
- Four busts of bishops, quatrefoil in between formerly held reliquaries of San Bartolo, reliefs, polychromed, [?], Sant'Agostino, San Gimignano.
- Madonna and Child, statue, polychromed, ca. 1317, Church of the Badia Fiorentina, Florence
- Funerary monument of Antonio d'Orso, seated figure on sarcophagus with console, 392 × 305 × 70 cm, 1323, counter-façade of Santa Maria del Fiore, Florence (fragment, see also Museo dell'Opera del Duomo, Florence)
- Funerary monument of Catherine of Austria, 1324, San Lorenzo Maggiore, Naples
- Madonna and Child between St. Benedict and St. Alferio, presenting [the donor] Abbot Filippo de Haya to the Madonna, and Two groups of pious women and Roman soldiers at the foot of the cross, reliefs, 1329–31, Benedictine Abbey of the Holy Trinity, Cava de' Tirreni, Salerno
- Funerary monument of Marie of Valois, 1331, Basilica di Santa Chiara, Naples
- Funerary monument of Queen Mary of Hungary, ca. 1335, Santa Maria Donnaregina, Naples

=== In museums ===
==== In Italy ====
- Pisa
  - Museo dell'Opera del Duomo
    - Altarpiece of Saint Rainerius, reliefs, 1300–06
    - Funerary monument of Henry VII, sculptural group and fragments of columns disassambled, 1313
    - St. Bartholomew, torso of a statuette in the round, 66 × 20 cm, from the Altar of the Emperor (consecrated to St. Bartholomew)
    - Evangelists Mark, Luke and John with their symbols, statuettes, each attached to a pillar, probably from the altare dell'imperatore
  - Museo Civico
    - Three fragments from the Baptistery with reliefs of the Life of Saint John, 1311–12
    - Virgin and Child, unfinished statuette, 79 cm, probably for the altare dell'imperatore
- Florence
  - Cathedral museum of Santa Croce
    - Funerary monument of Cassone della Torre, after 1318
  - Museo dell'Opera del Duomo
    - Fragments of a Baptism of Christ from above the south door of Florence Baptistery, 1320–24
      - Christ Blessing, upper half of figure, 101 × 37.5 × 27 cm
      - Head of Saint John the Baptist, fragment of lost figure
    - Fragments of a threepart group of the Theological Virtues from above the east gate of Florence Baptistery, 1320–24:
      - The Faith, bust (fragment of lost figure), 64 × 45 × 33 cm
      - The Charity/Love, half figure (fragment), 73 × 64 × 28 cm
      - The Hope, head (of lost figure), 33,5 × 22 × 23,5 cm
    - Two Drape-Holding Angels, 1321/23, statues from the funerary monument of Antonio d'Orso, 36.5 × 57.5 cm and 35 × 56.8 cm
    - Angel with Trumpet, statue, 58 × 21 × 16.5 cm, ca. 1321, since 1380 at the south gate of the nave to the Campanile.
  - Bargello
    - Madonna and Child (Sedes sapientiae), statue, 1321
  - Museo Bardini
    - Caritas, three-quarter figure, ca. 1320–24, probably for Florence Baptistery
  - Cenacolo di Santo Spirito (Fondazione Salvatore Romano)
    - A Caryatid and an Angel, statues
- Turin, Museo Civico
  - Madonna and Child, statue, ca. 1312–15

==== Elsewhere ====
- Frankfurt, Liebieghaus
  - Angel as Carrier of a Sarcophagus
  - Angel with Kneeling Donor
- London, Victoria and Albert Museum
  - Column with Spiral Bands of Acanthus Foliage (and naked boys playing), two pillars believed to be from the tomb of Henry VII, 115.3 and 116.2 × 28 cm, ca. 1315 (73-1882 and 74-1822)
  - Two Angels Drawing Curtains, pair of statues from a tomb monument, 64 × 43 ×12.5 cm (36 kg) and 63 × 32 ×12 cm (31 kg), ca. 1320 (7566-1861 and 7567-1861)
  - Virgin and Child, relief, 48 × 37.2 cm, ca. 1330 (A.31-1964)
- Paris, Louvre
  - Saint Benedict, statue, 48.3 × 16 cm, ca. 1330–32, for the Benedictine Abbey of the Holy Trinity in Cava dei Tirreni (RF 4692)
- Washington, National Gallery of Art
  - Madonna and Child with Queen Sancia, Saints, and Angels, relief, 51.4 × 37.8 cm (15 kg), ca. 1335 (1960.5.1)

== Gallery of works ==
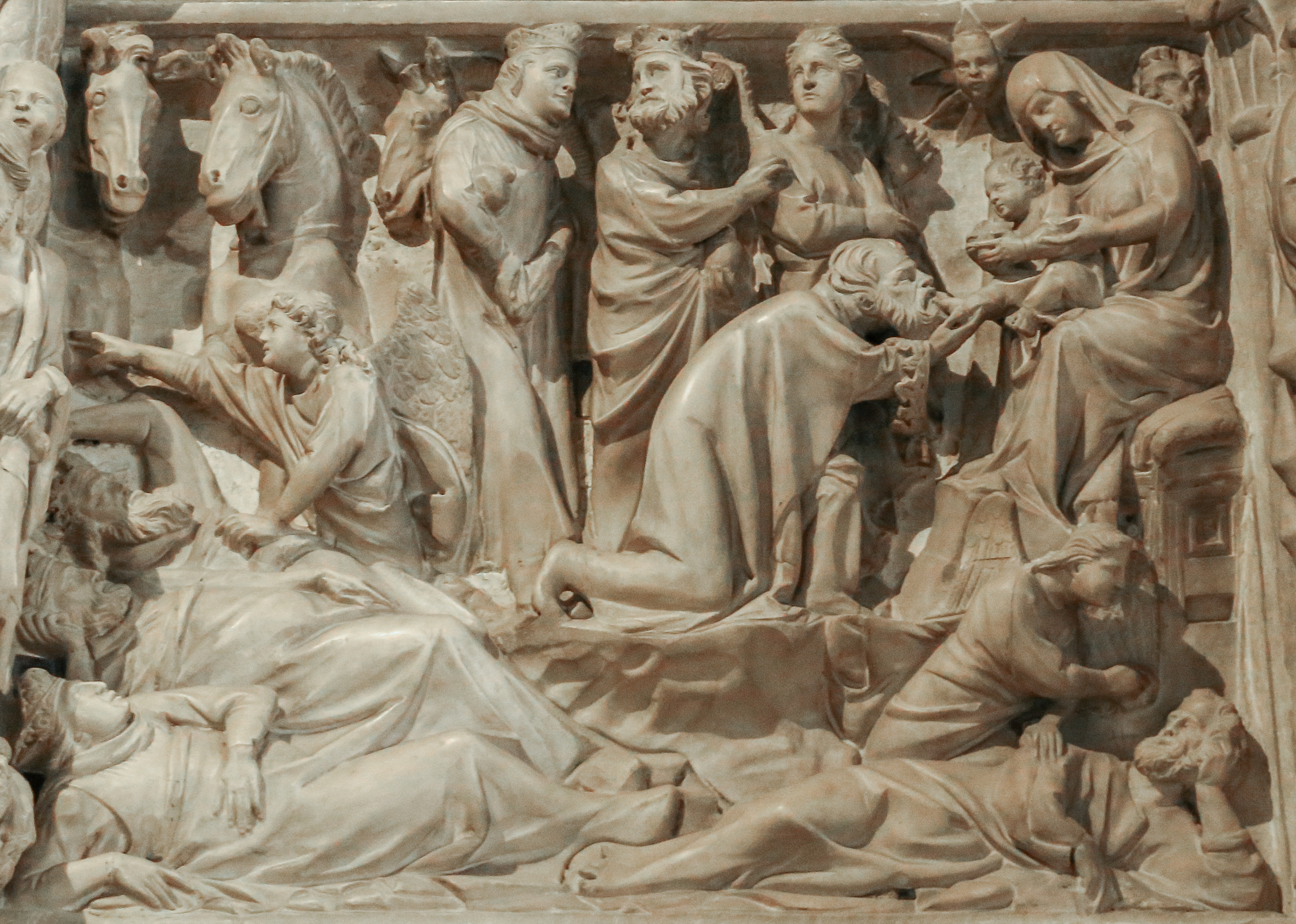
Giovanni Pisano and Tino di Camaino, Dream of the Magi, Pulpit of Sant' Andrea, Pistoia, 1301

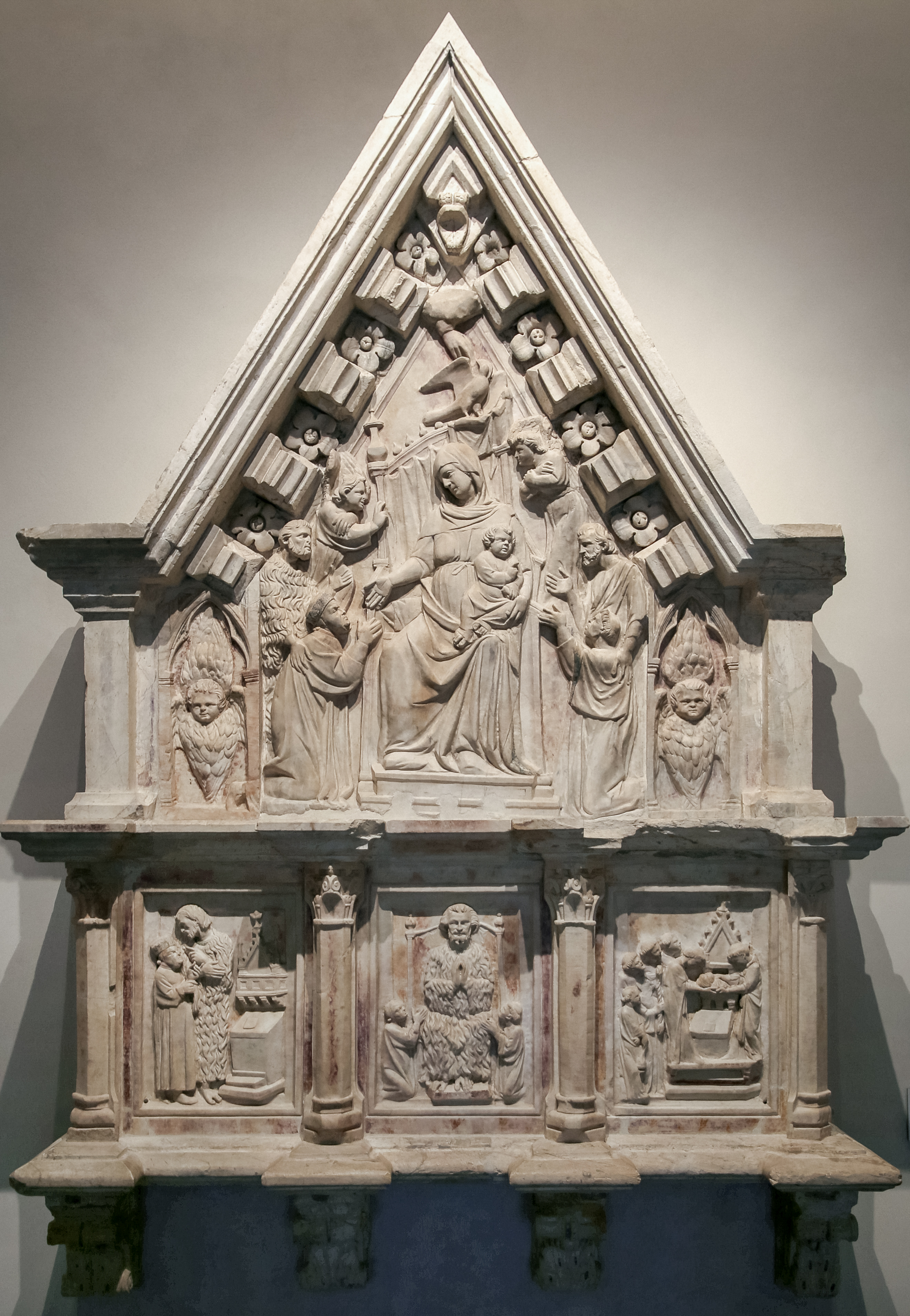
Tomb of Saint Rainerius, ca. 1300–06, Pisa

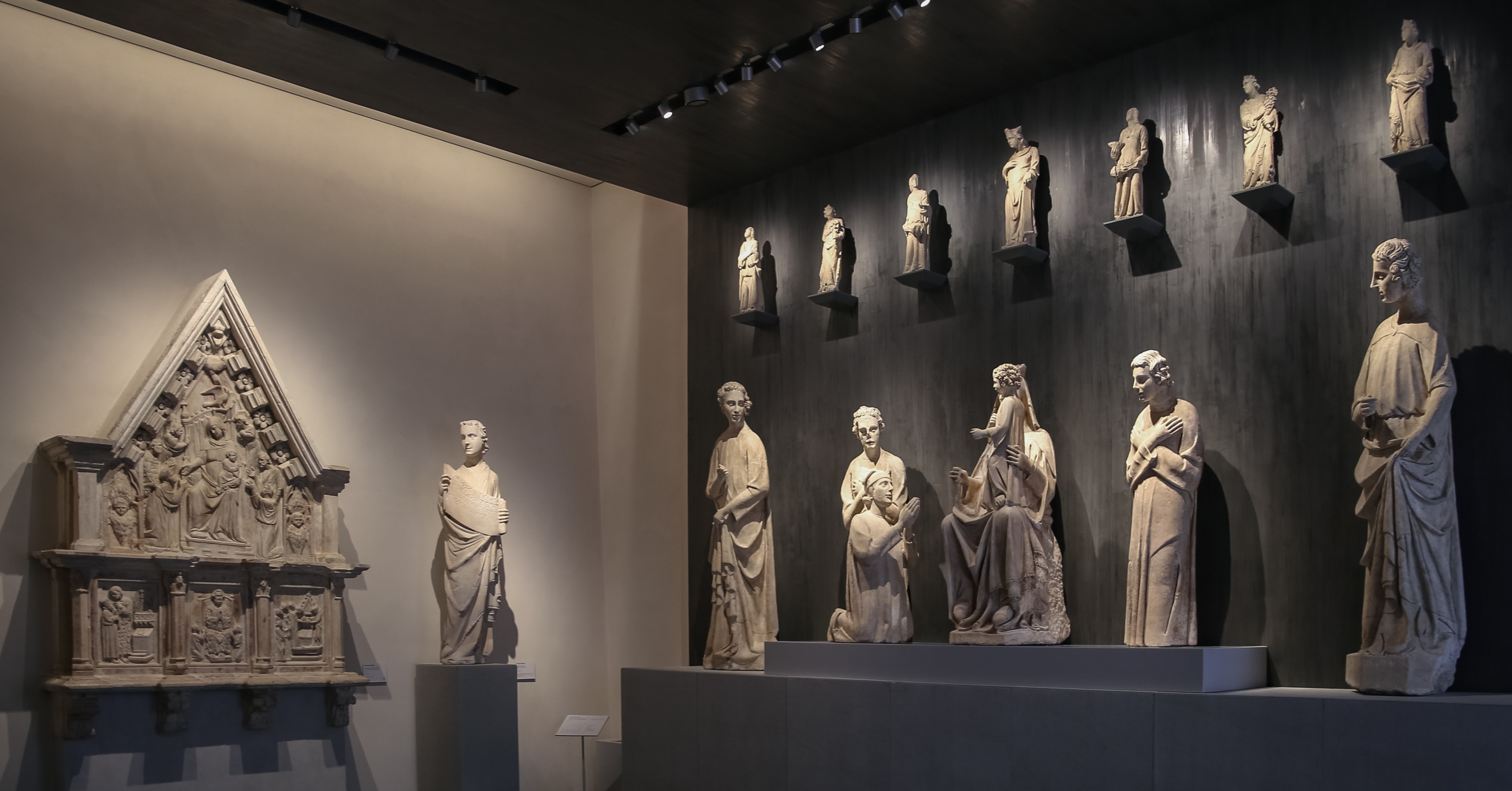
Altarpiece of San Ranieri (1305), and statues from the tomb of Henry VII (1313), Pisa

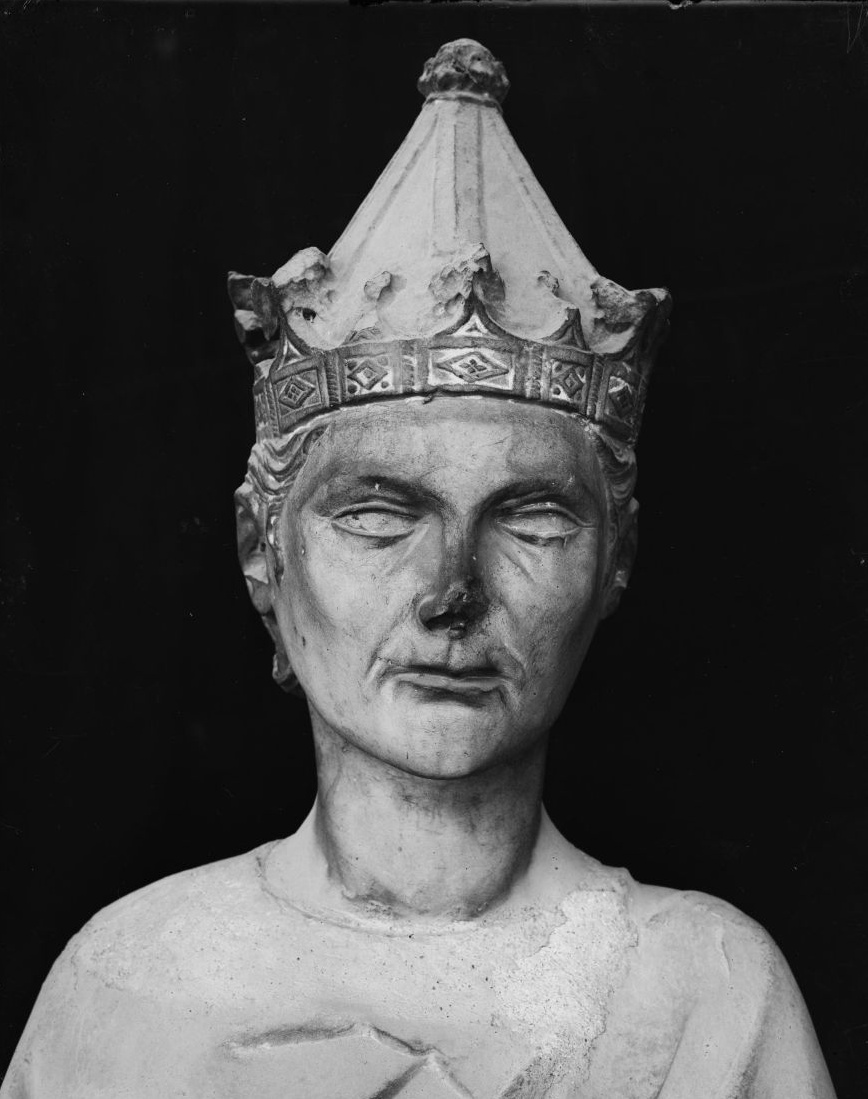
Detail of the figure of Henry VII from his tomb, Pisa

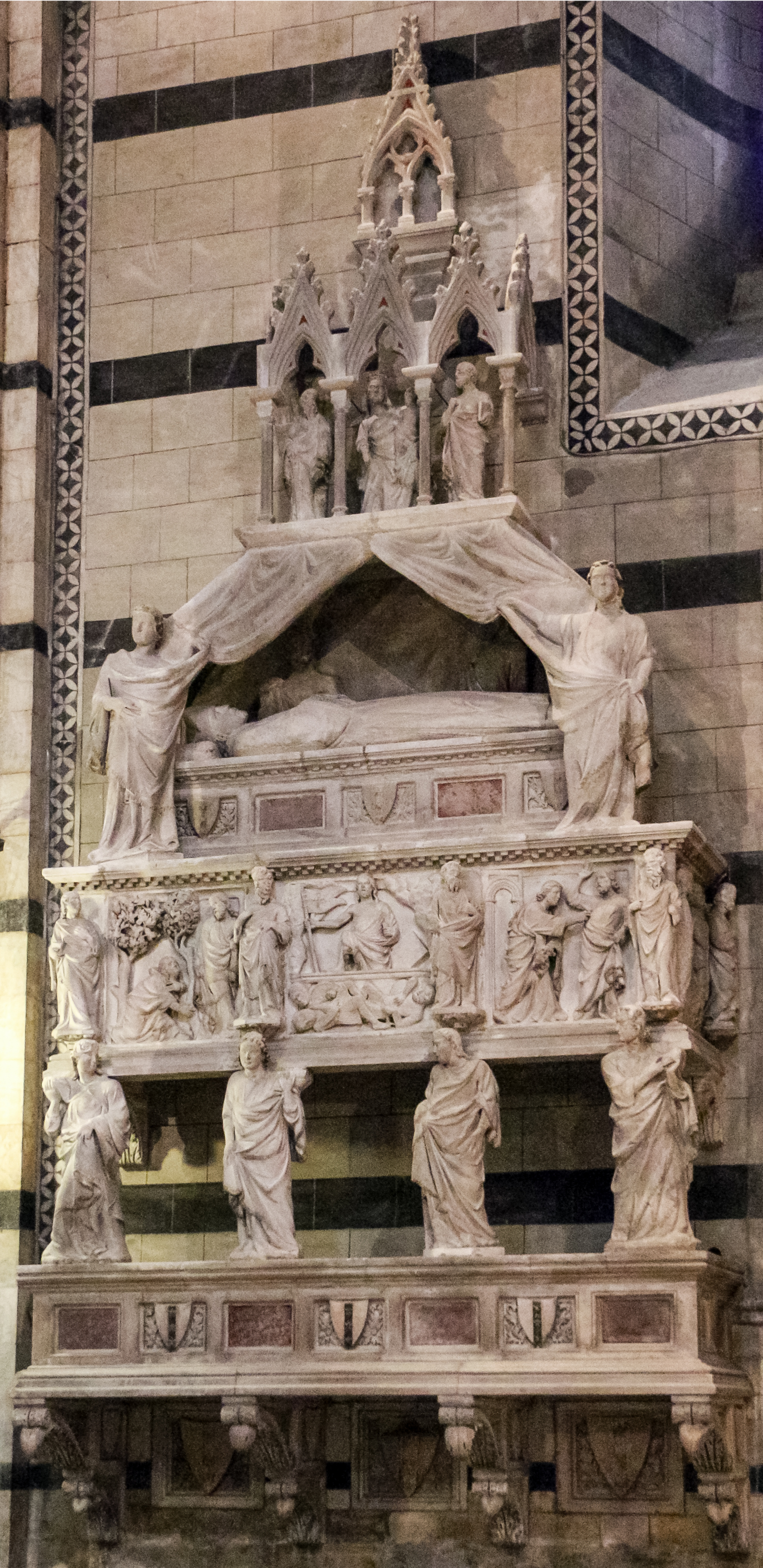
Monumental tomb of Cardinal Riccardo Petroni, 1314, Siena

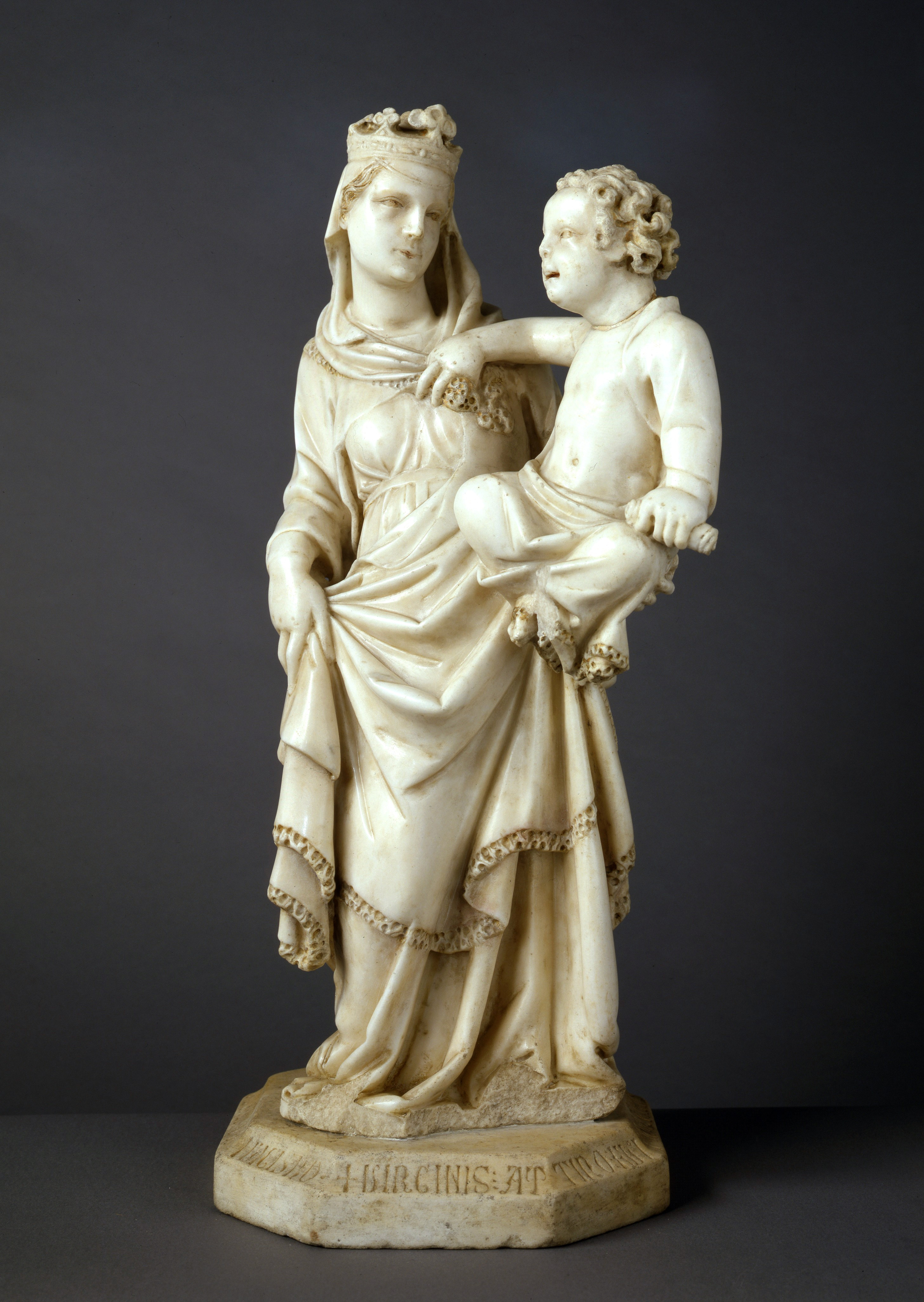
Madonna and Child, ca. 1312–15, Turin

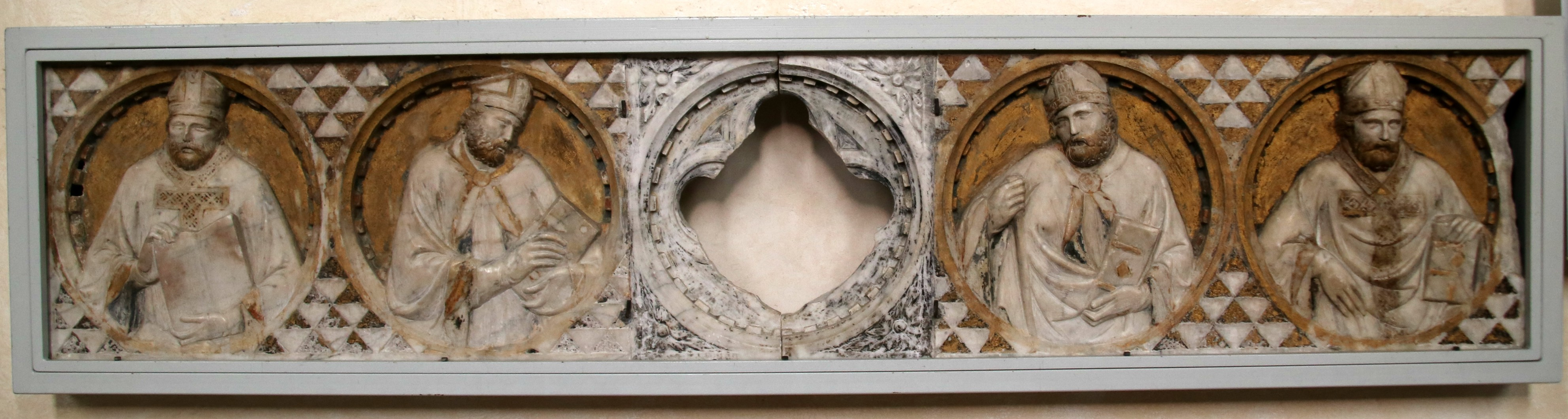
Reliquary of Saint Bartholomew, Sant'Agostino, San Gimignano

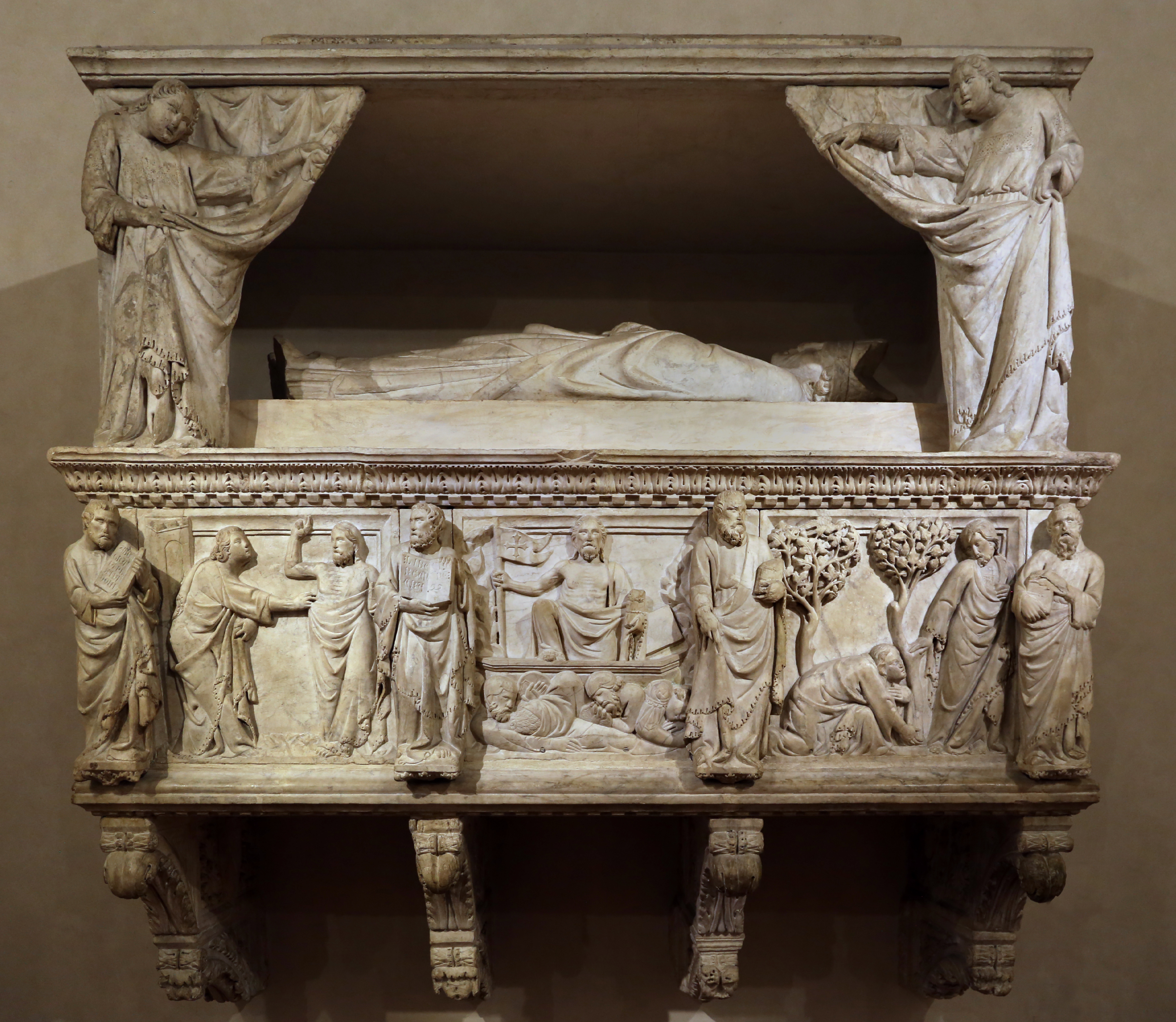
Monumental tomb of Cassone della Torre, after 1318, Santa Croce Museum, Florence

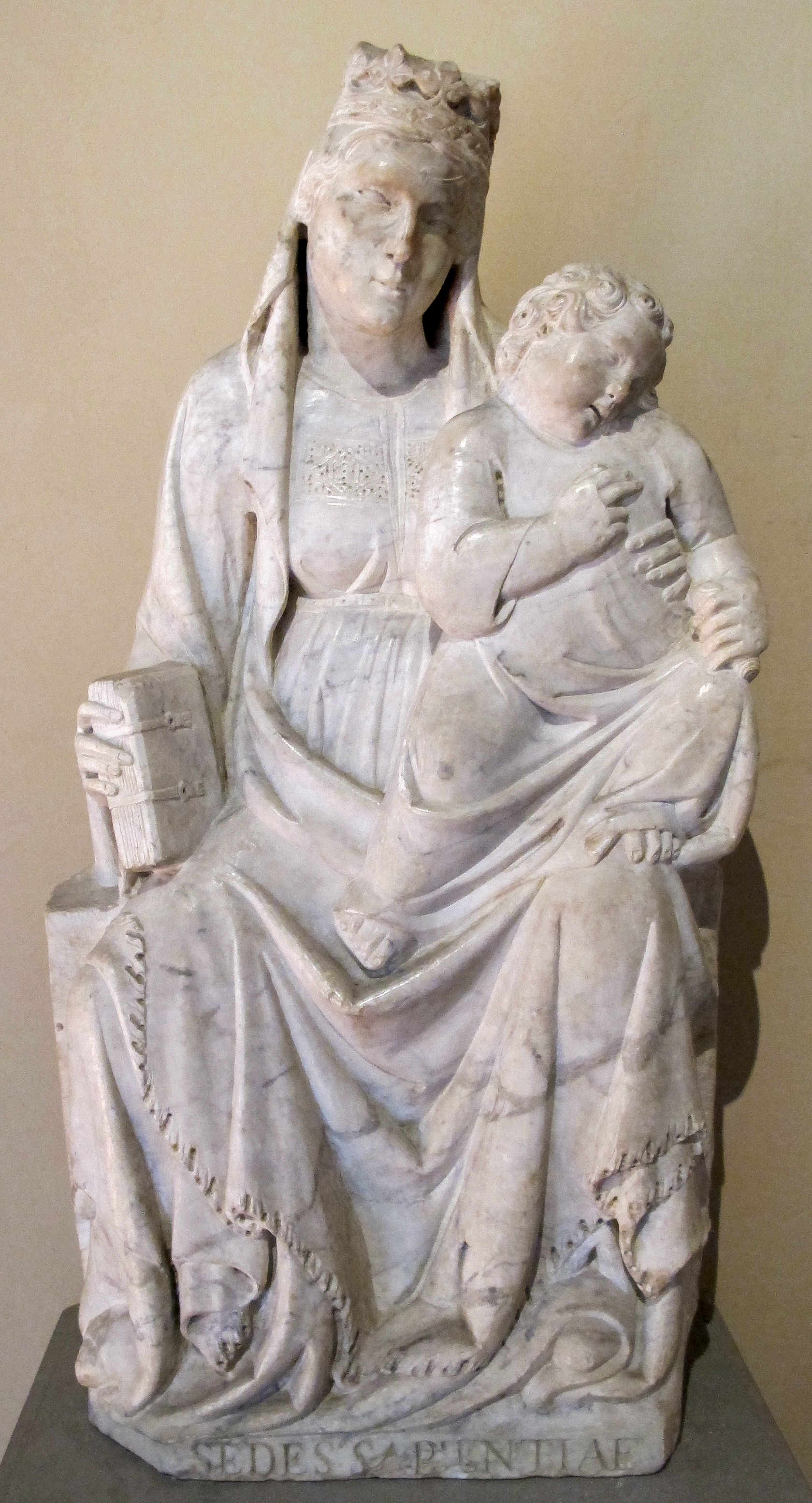
Sedes sapientiae, ca. 1300–30, Bargello, Florence

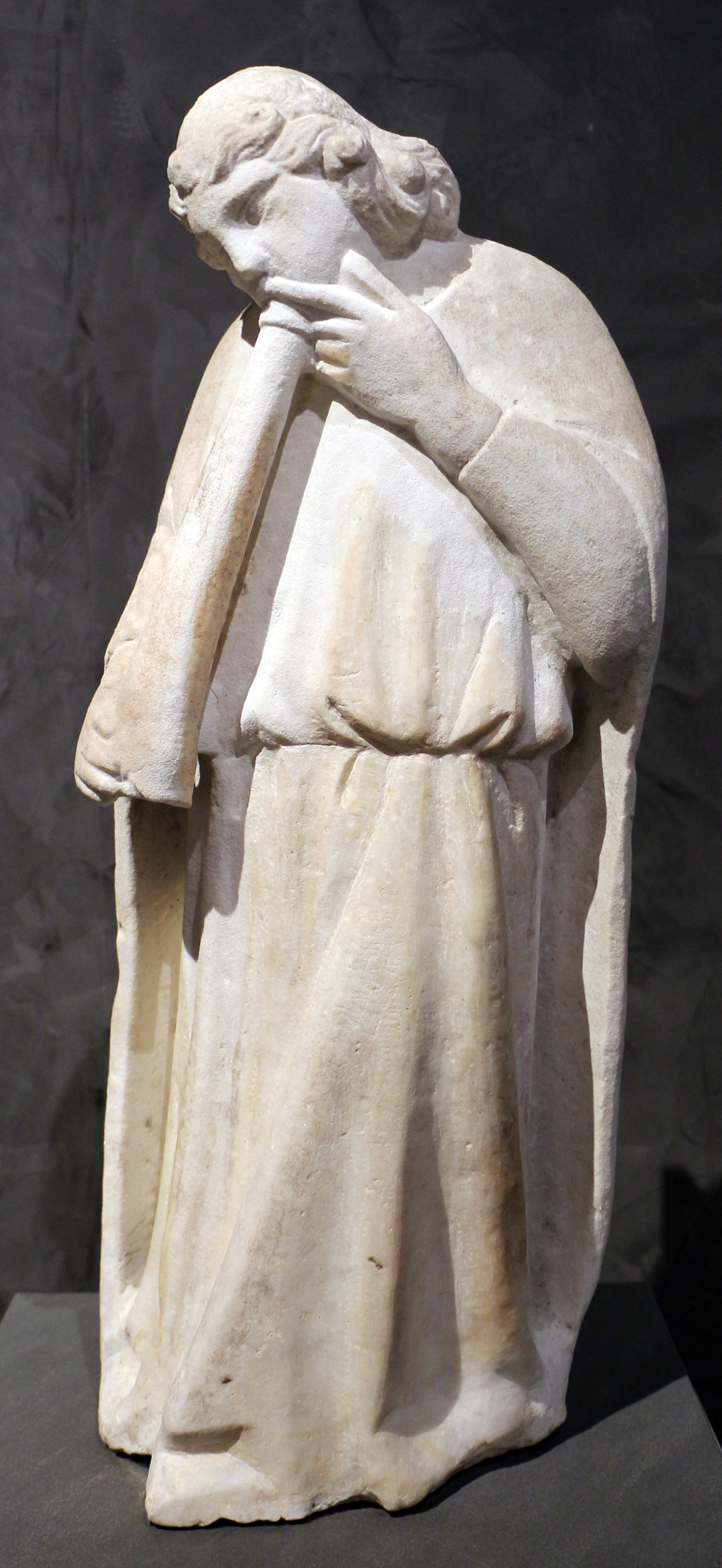
Angel with Tuba, 1321, from the south portal of the nave, Florence Cathedral

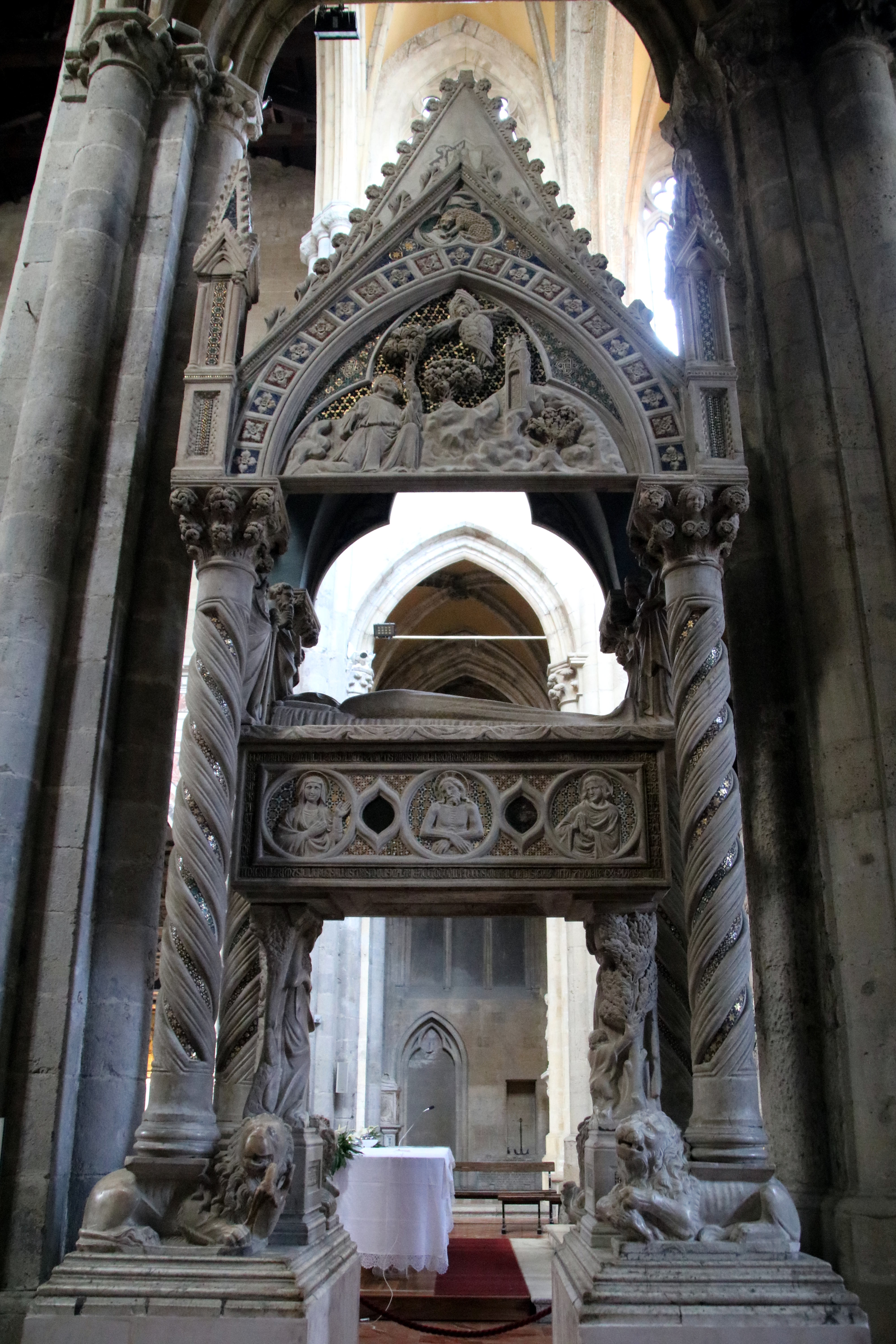
Funerary monument of Catherine of Austria, 1324, San Lorenzo Maggiore, Naples

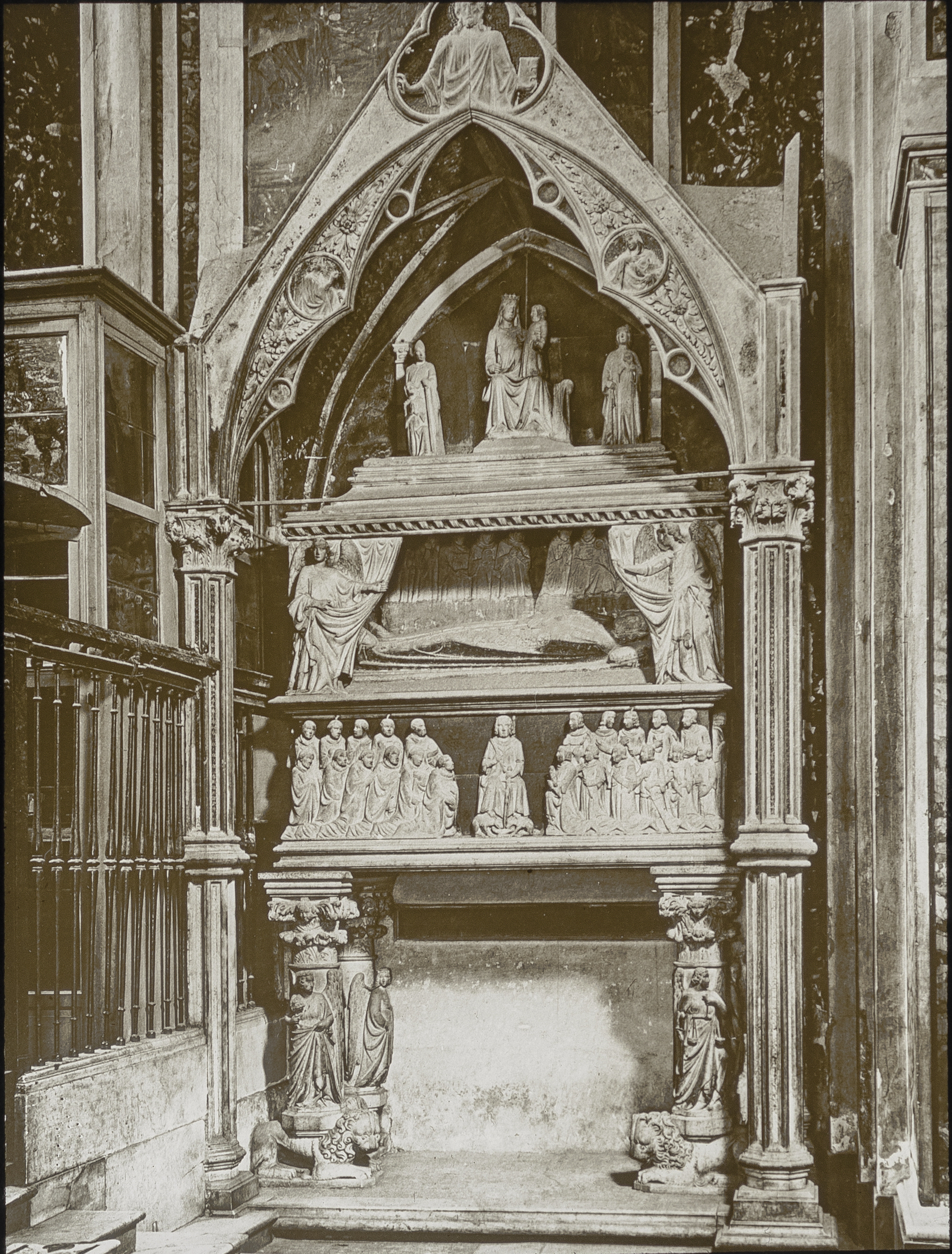
Monumental tomb of Marie of Valois, 1331, Santa Chiara, Naples

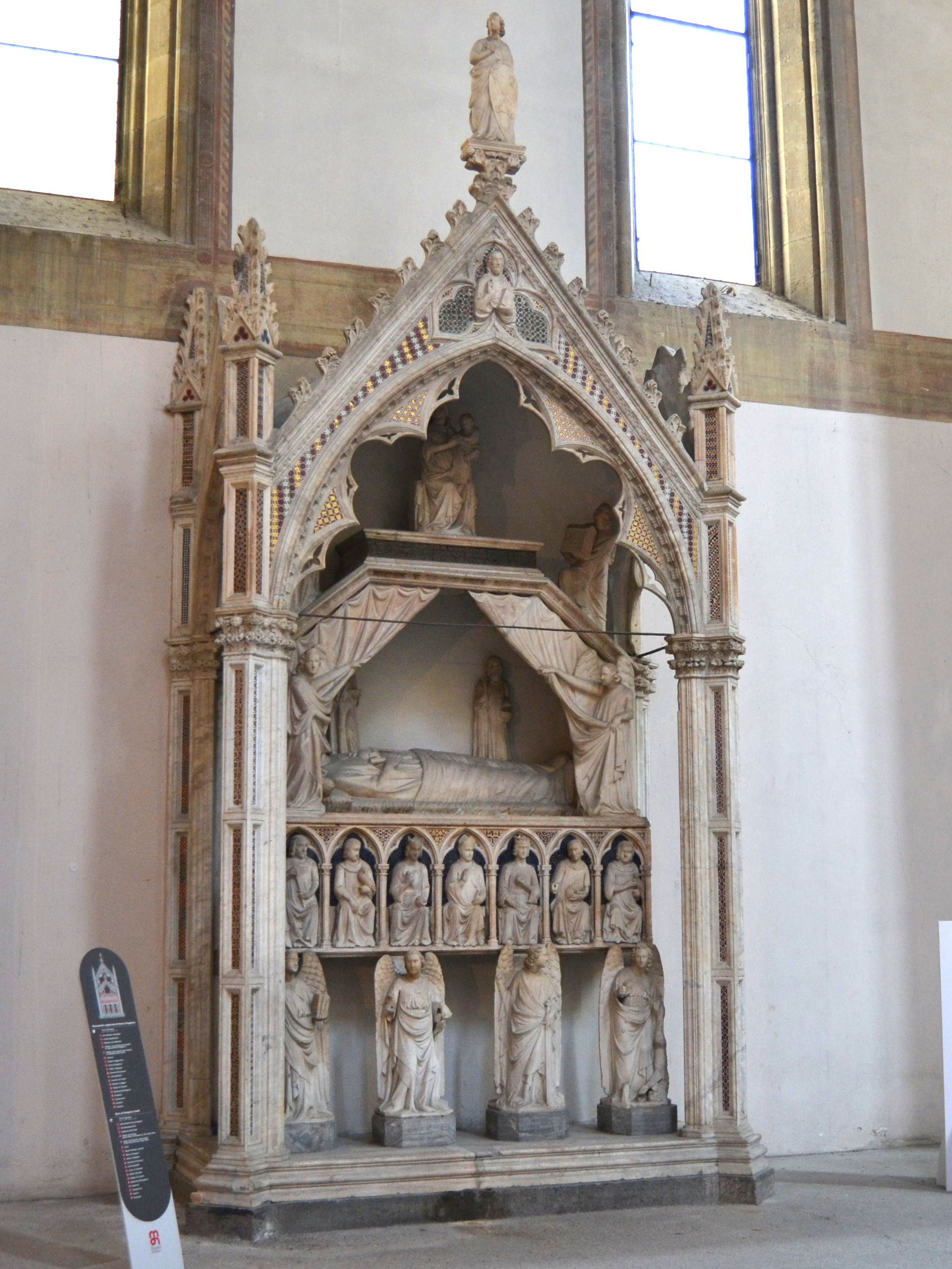
Monumental tomb of Queen Mary of Hungary, Santa Maria Donnaregina, Naples

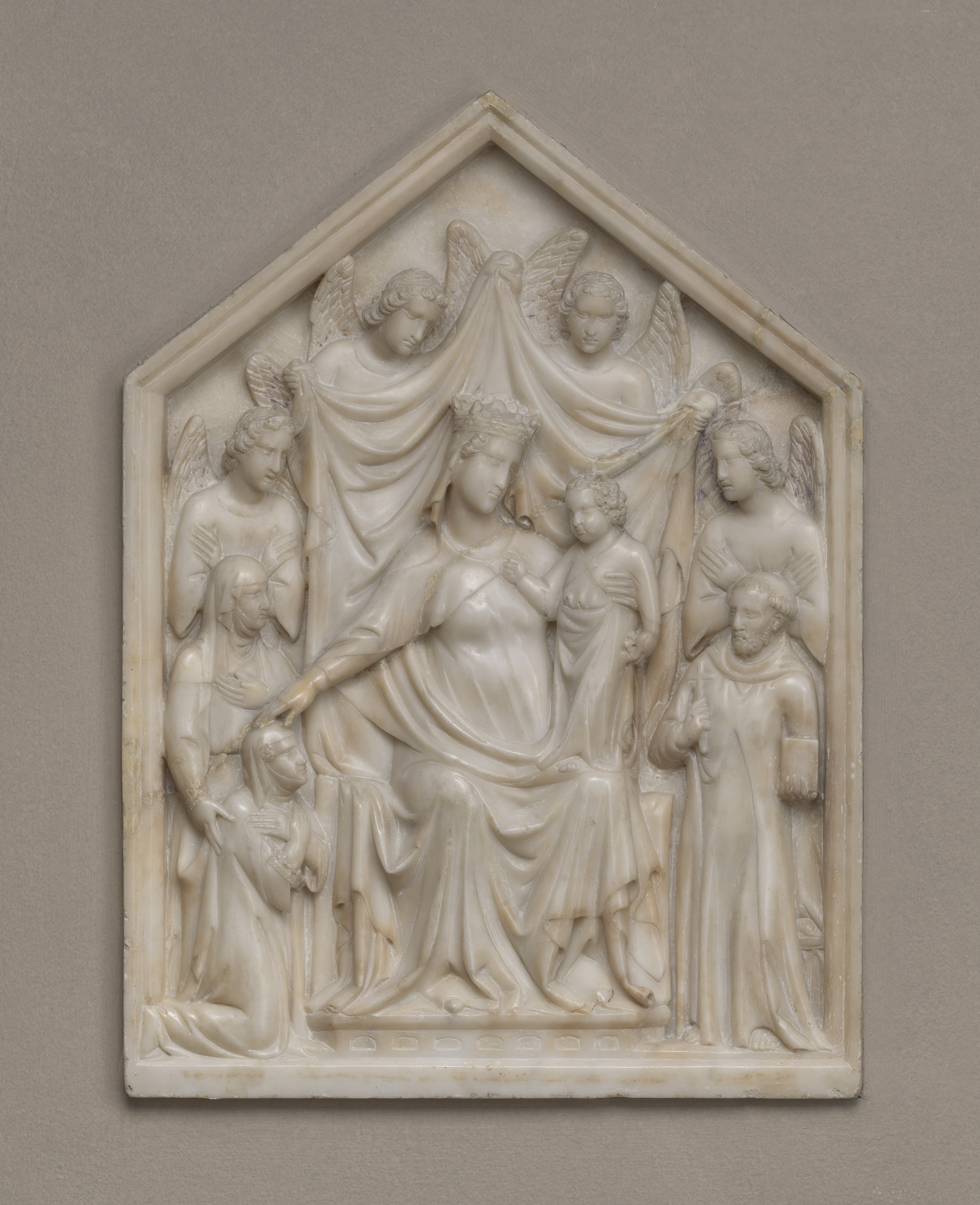
Madonna and Child with Queen Sancia, Saints, and Angels, ca. 1335, Washington

== Bibliography ==
- Giorgio Vasari. "Giovanni Pisano", in: Lives of the Most Excellent Painters, Sculptors, and Architects. 1568 edition. Translated by Adrienne DeAngelis on the basis of that by Gaston C. DeVere (1912/1915), and edited online in 2011.
- Géza de Francovich (1937). "TINO di Camaino". Italian Encyclopedia (in Italian). Treccani.it.
- Gert Kreytenberg (1978). "Giovani Pisano oder Tino di Camaino?". Jahrbuch der Berliner Museen (in German). Vol. 20. Staatliche Museen zu Berlin – Preußischer Kulturbesitz. pp. 29–38. JSTOR 4125742.
- Gert Kreytenberg (June 1982). "Fragments of an Altar of St Bartholomew by Tino di Camaino in Pisa Cathedral". The Burlington Magazine. 124 (951): 349–353. JSTOR 880833.
- Gert Kreytenberg. Die Werke von Tino di Camaino. Liebieghaus Monographie, Frankfurt am Main 1987 (in German).
- F. Aceto (2000). "TINO di Camaino". Enciclopedia dell' Arte Medievale (in Italian). Treccani.it.
- Carlos Sastre Vázquez. Contemplando una obra maestra de Tino di Camaino. Ruta Cicloturística del Románico Internacional, XXX (2012), pp. 65–69, transcript and scans at Slideshare.net (in Spanish).
- Roberto Bartalini (2019). "Tino di Camaino, un riscoperto 'San Giovanni Battista' e i marmi della badia di Cava dei Tirreni". Prospettiva (in Italian). 173: 46–60. JSTOR 26952781.
- "Tino di Camaino". Enciclopedia on line (in Italian). Treccani.it.

=== Further reading ===
- Enzo Carli. Tino di Camaino, scultore. Felice le Monnier, Florence 1934 (in Italian).
- Wilhelm Valentiner (1935). Tino di Camaino. A Sienese Sculptor of the Fourteenth Century. Paris: Pegasus Press.
