= Perugia Crucifix =

1272 painting by the Master of Saint Francis

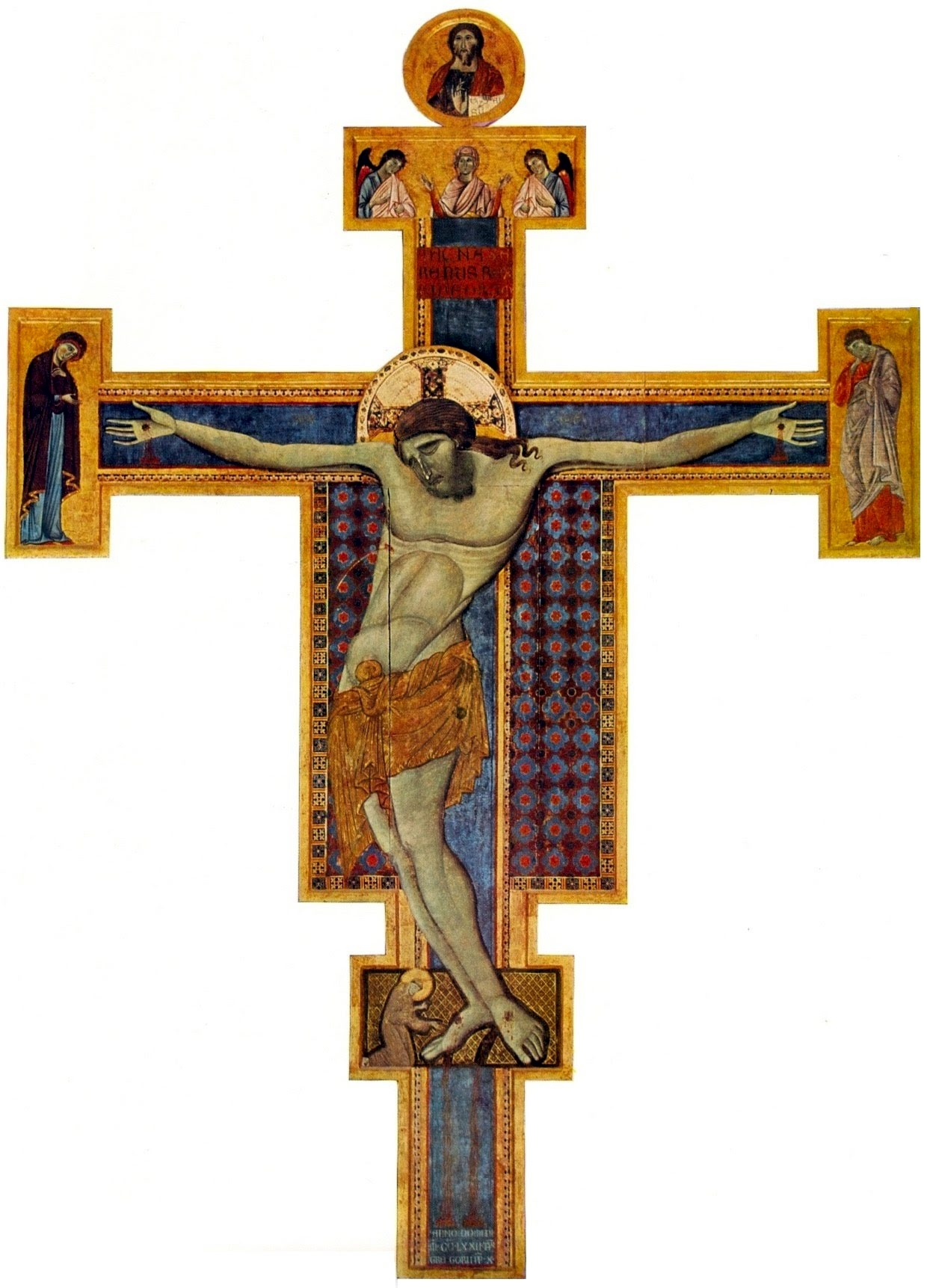
- Artist: Master of St Francis
- Year: 1272
- Medium: tempera and gold on panel
- Dimensions: 410 cm × 328 cm (160 in × 129 in)
- Location: Galleria nazionale dell'Umbria, Perugia

The Perugia Crucifix (Italian - Crocifisso di Perugia ) is a gold and tempera on panel painted crucifix of the Christus patiens type. It is dated to 1272 thanks to an inscription on its base reading "ANNO DOMINI MCCLXXII TEMPORE GREGORI P.P.X.. It is held in the Galleria nazionale dell'Umbria, in Perugia.

It is one of a small number definitively attributed to the Master of Saint Francis. It was first attributed to him by Henry Thode in 1885.
