= Isaac Master (painter) =

13th-century Italian Gothic painter

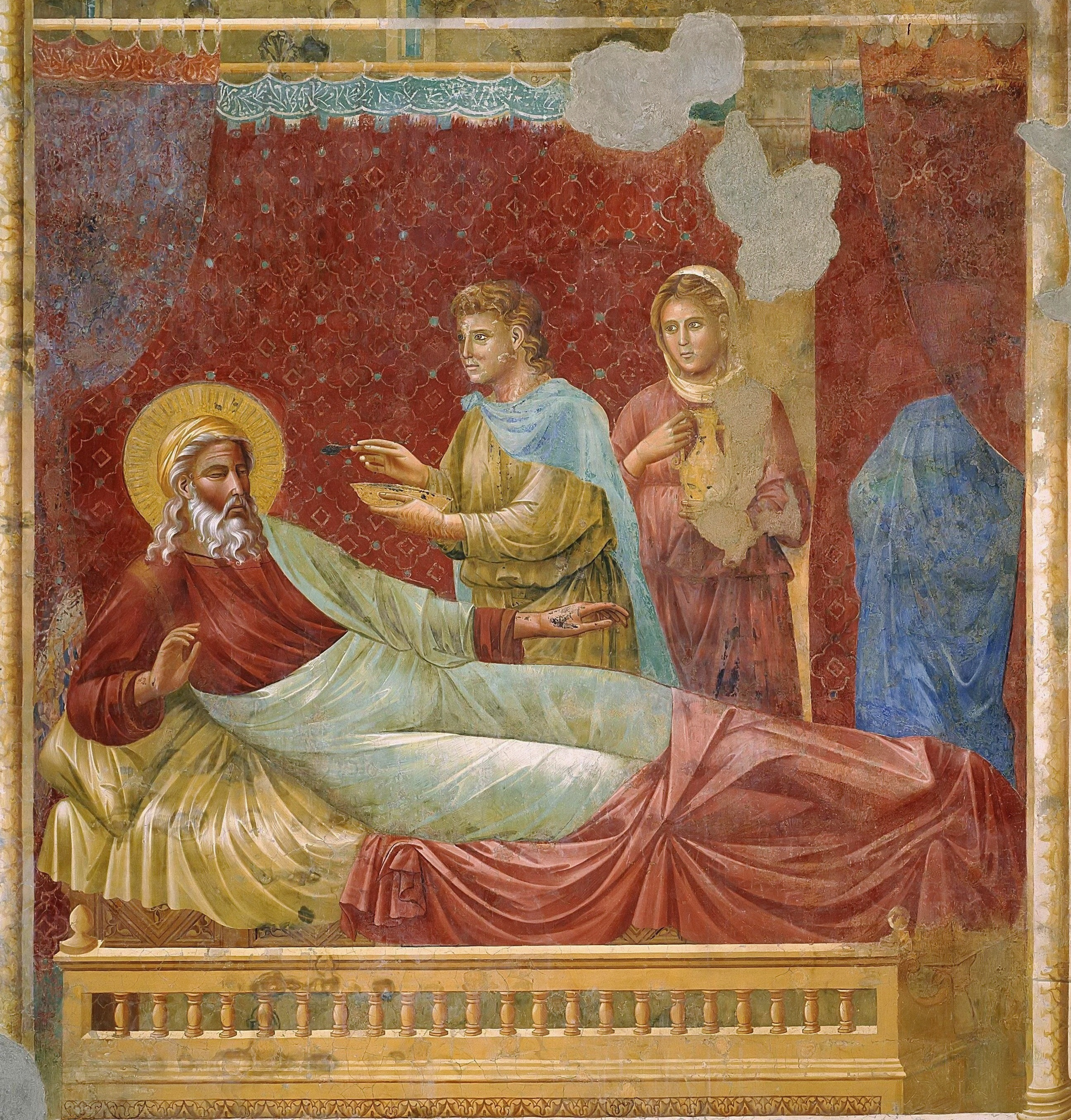
Scenes from the Old Testament, Isaac Rejecting Esau

The Isaac Master was an Italian Gothic painter active in the decoration of the Basilica of San Francesco d'Assisi in Assisi at the end of the thirteenth century. Master's name is derived from a fresco painting of the death of Isaac for which he is known, the fresco is located in the Upper Church of St Francis at Assisi, depicting Isaac blessing Jacob and Esau.

== The frescoes ==
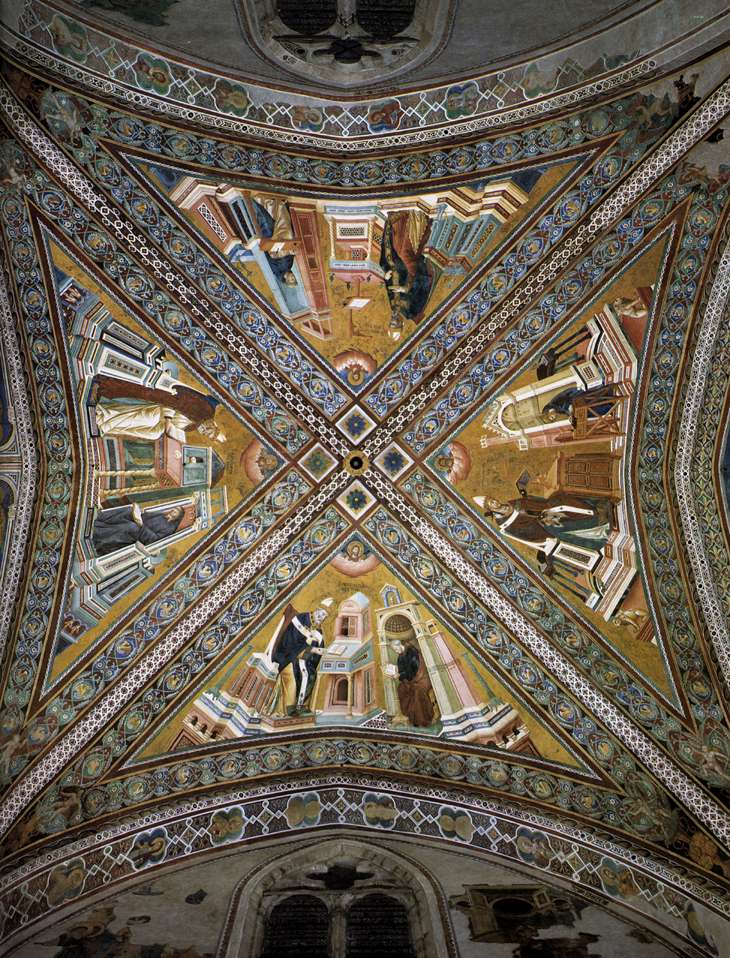
The Master of Isaac's vault depicting The Doctors of the Church in the Basilica of San Francesco d'Assisi

The Isaac Master has been attributed with a historic series of artworks on the Old Testament in the Basilica of Saint Francis of Assisi, dated c. 1291–1295, among which are the following:

- Benedizione di Isacco a Giacobbe
- Esaù respinto da Isacco
- Giuseppe calato nel pozzo
- Ritrovamento della coppa nel sacco di Beniamino
- Uccisione di Abele
- Volta dei Dottori della Chiesa (in large part destroyed by the 1997 Umbria and Marche earthquake)

In the first two frescoes (depicting Isaac and Jacob and then Esau and Isaac), the setting is the same. Isaac lies blind on his death bed while another person (first Jacob, then Esau) reaches out to their father. A third setting is taken by Rebecca that watches over, worrying over whether the deception of the exchange of brothers succeeds.

In both scenes, a heavy curtain closes the background to highlight the representation like a three-dimensional box. Each person's volume takes up space in the scene: an imagined architecture in asymmetrical relief makes an frame for the bed of Isaac, composing a solid parallelepiped. Interrupting the two scenes is an episode that depicts Isaac in the act of giving his blessing to Isaac. The curtain lifted by Rebecca forms folds that give more movement to the scene.

== Identity ==
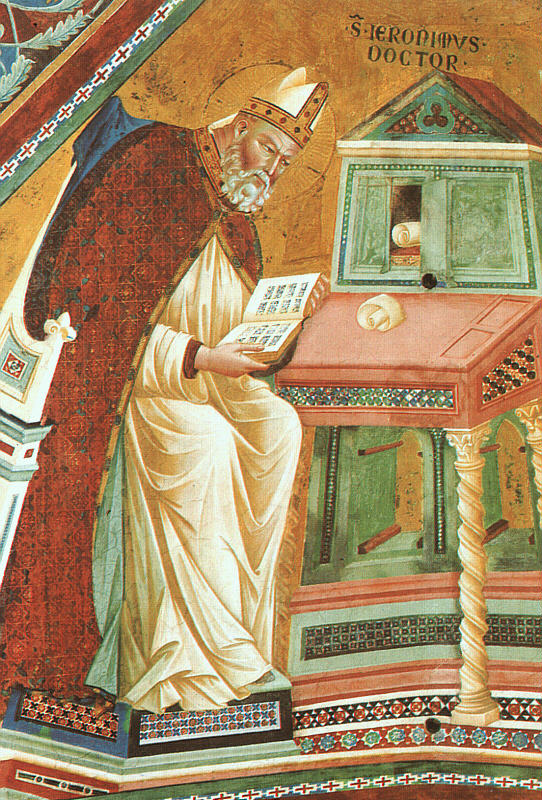
Isaac, after whom the Master is given his name, as a "doctor of the church"

The Isaac Master, for his elevated technical level, is considered one of the first Italian Gothic painters, distant from the painters of his age. Much discussion has been held as to who the Master was. Some speculate that he was Gaddo di Zanobi Gaddi (due to similarity with Gaddi's work in Rome and Florence), while others say Pietro Cavallini, Arnolfo di Cambio, or Giotto.

The Master seems to have been familiar with the Roman artists Filippo Rusuti and Jacopo Torriti, as well as with the Tuscan artists Cimabue and Duccio. In his depictions of volume and dimension, he anticipates some of the advances made by Giotto in his work by about a decade; for this reason, he is considered to be a central figure in the "Giotto question". These features also contribute to the theory that he was an artist at the peak of his career or a student of Cimabue, perhaps a very young Giotto.

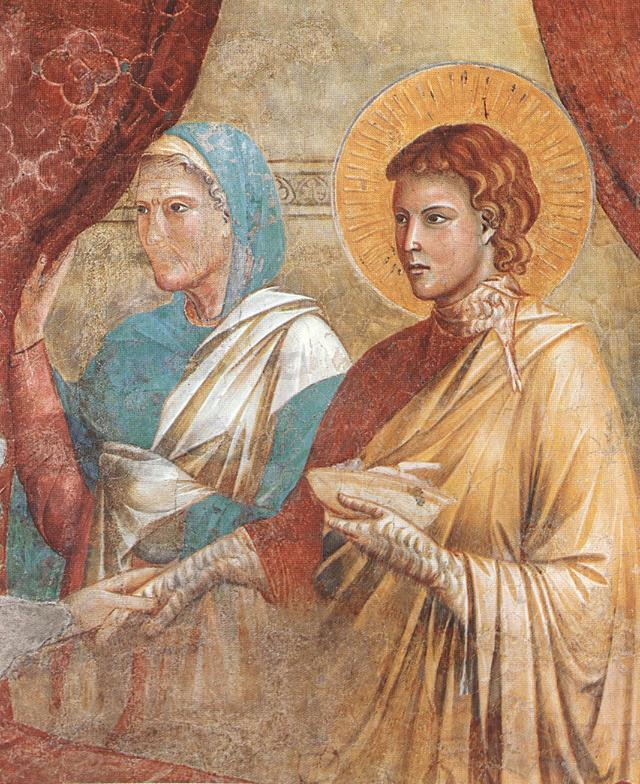
Detail of Isaac Blessing Jacob

For many decades, the traditional attribution of the frescoes of the Vita di San Francesco in the Upper Basilica has been questioned, particularly by English art historians like Rintelen, Oertel, or Meiss. Italian scholars, however, remain mostly convinced by Vasari's attribution of the frescoes to Giotto. The recent conservation by Bruno Zanardi after the 1997 Umbria and Marche earthquake shed new light on the debate. Zanardi supported the opinion of Federico Zeri that thought the frescoes executed by a painting of the Roman school, perhaps Pietro Cavallini, the only great Gothic painter not confirmed to have contributed to the basilica, or his contemporaries Filippo Rusuti and Jacopo Torriti.

The frescoes are close to both Cavallini's techniques and his saturated and warm color palette: they are similar to his frescoes at Santa Cecilia in Trastevere. Still, the accepted attribution is still to Giotto or, less often, Arnolfo di Cambio.

== Bibliography ==
- Simi Varanelli, E. (1989). "Dal Maestro d'Isacco a Giotto. Contributo alla storia della perspectiva". Arte medievale. pp. v. 3, 115–143.
- Bonsanti, Giorgio (2002). La Basilica di San Francesco ad Assisi (in Italian). Modena: Franco Cosimo Panini Editore.
