= Basilica of Saint Francis of Assisi =

Catholic church of the Order of Friars Minor Conventual in Assisi

- Basilica di San Francesco d'Assisi; Basilica Sancti Francisci Assisiensis
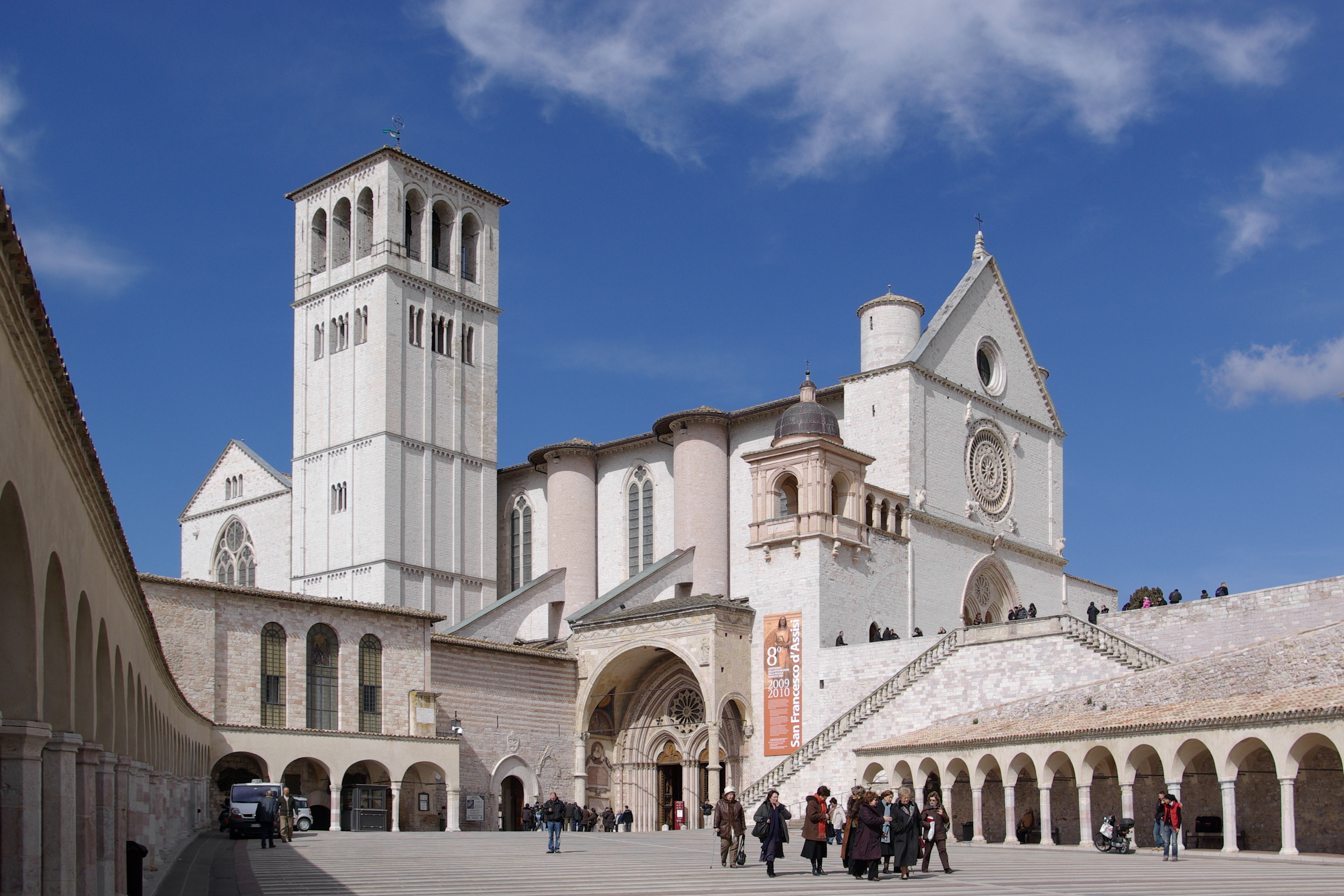
- The Lower and Upper basilicas and the portico, as seen from the Lower Plaza of Saint Francis.
- Basilica of Saint Francis of Assisi
- 43°04′29″N 12°36′20″E
- Location: Assisi, Italy
- Denomination: Roman Catholic
- Religious order: Order of Friars Minor Conventual
- Website: sanfrancescoassisi.org

History
- Status: Papal minor basilica
- Consecrated: 1253

Architecture
- Architect: Maestro Jacopo Tedesco
- Architectural type: Church
- Style: Romanesque, Italian Gothic
- Groundbreaking: 1227

Specifications
- Length: 80 metres (260 ft)
- Width: 50 metres (160 ft)

Administration
- Division: Pontifical Legation for the Basilicas of Saint Francis and Saint Mary of the Angels in Assisi
- Diocese: Diocese of Assisi-Nocera Umbra-Gualdo Tadino

UNESCO World Heritage Site
- Official name: Assisi, the Basilica of San Francesco and Other Franciscan Sites
- Type: Cultural
- Criteria: i, ii, iii, iv, vi
- Designated: 2000 (24th session)
- Reference no.: 990
- Region: Europe and North America

The Basilica of Saint Francis of Assisi (Italian: Basilica di San Francesco d'Assisi; Latin: Basilica Sancti Francisci Assisiensis) is the mother church of the Roman Catholic Order of Friars Minor Conventual in Assisi, a town in the Umbria region in central Italy, where Saint Francis was born and died. It is a papal minor basilica and one of the most important places of Christian pilgrimage in Italy. With its accompanying friary, Sacro Convento, the basilica is a distinctive landmark to those approaching Assisi. It has been a UNESCO World Heritage Site since 2000.

The basilica, which was begun in 1228, is built into the side of a hill and comprises two churches (known as the Upper Church and the Lower Church) and a crypt, where the remains of the saint are interred. The interior of the Upper Church is an important early example of the Gothic style in Italy. The Upper and Lower Churches are decorated with frescoes by numerous late medieval painters from the Roman and Tuscan schools, and include works by Cimabue, Giotto, Simone Martini, Pietro Lorenzetti, and possibly Pietro Cavallini. The range and quality of the works give the basilica a unique importance in demonstrating the outstanding development of Italian art of this period, especially if compared with the rest of Christian Europe.

== History ==
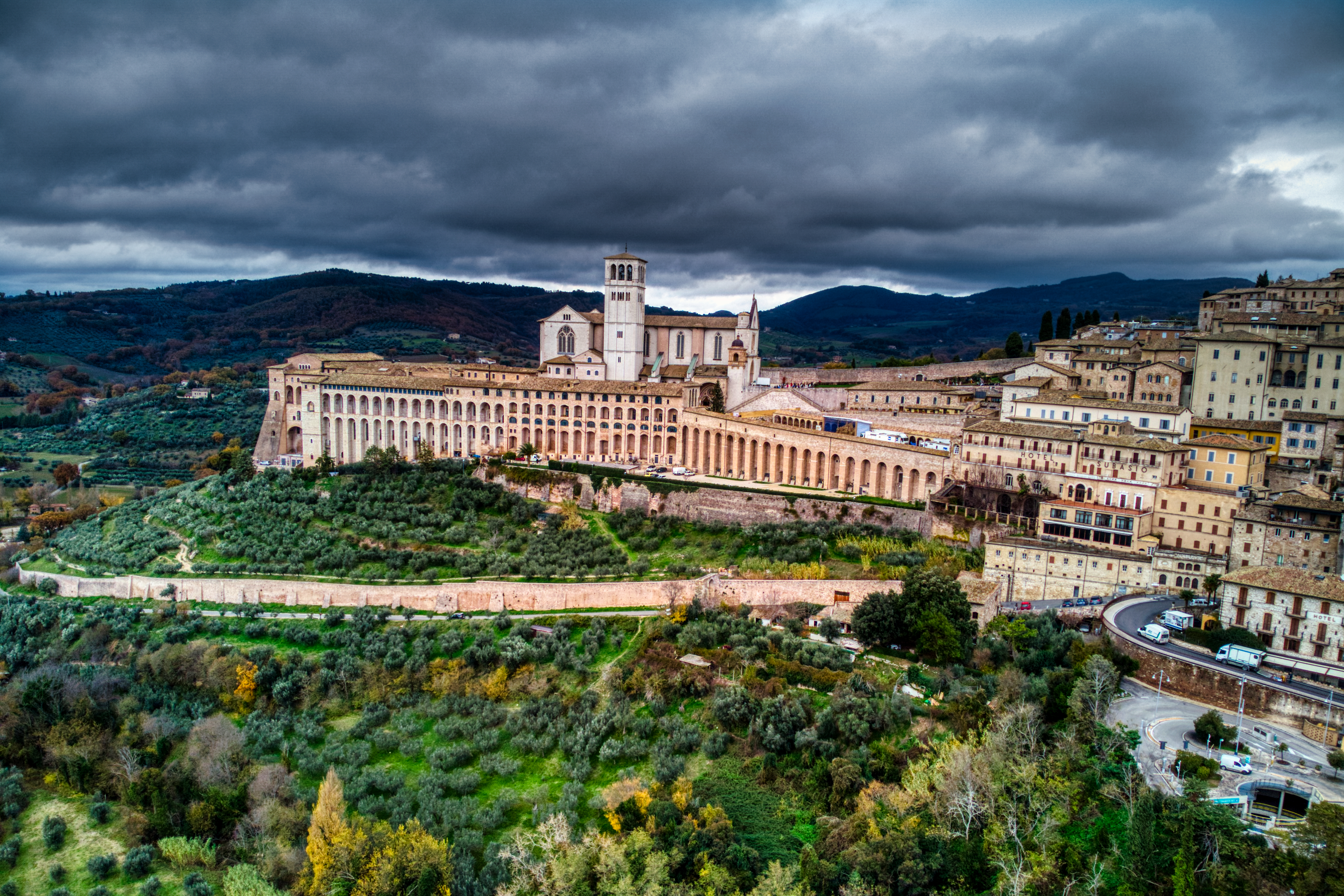
Basilica, as seen from the valley below.

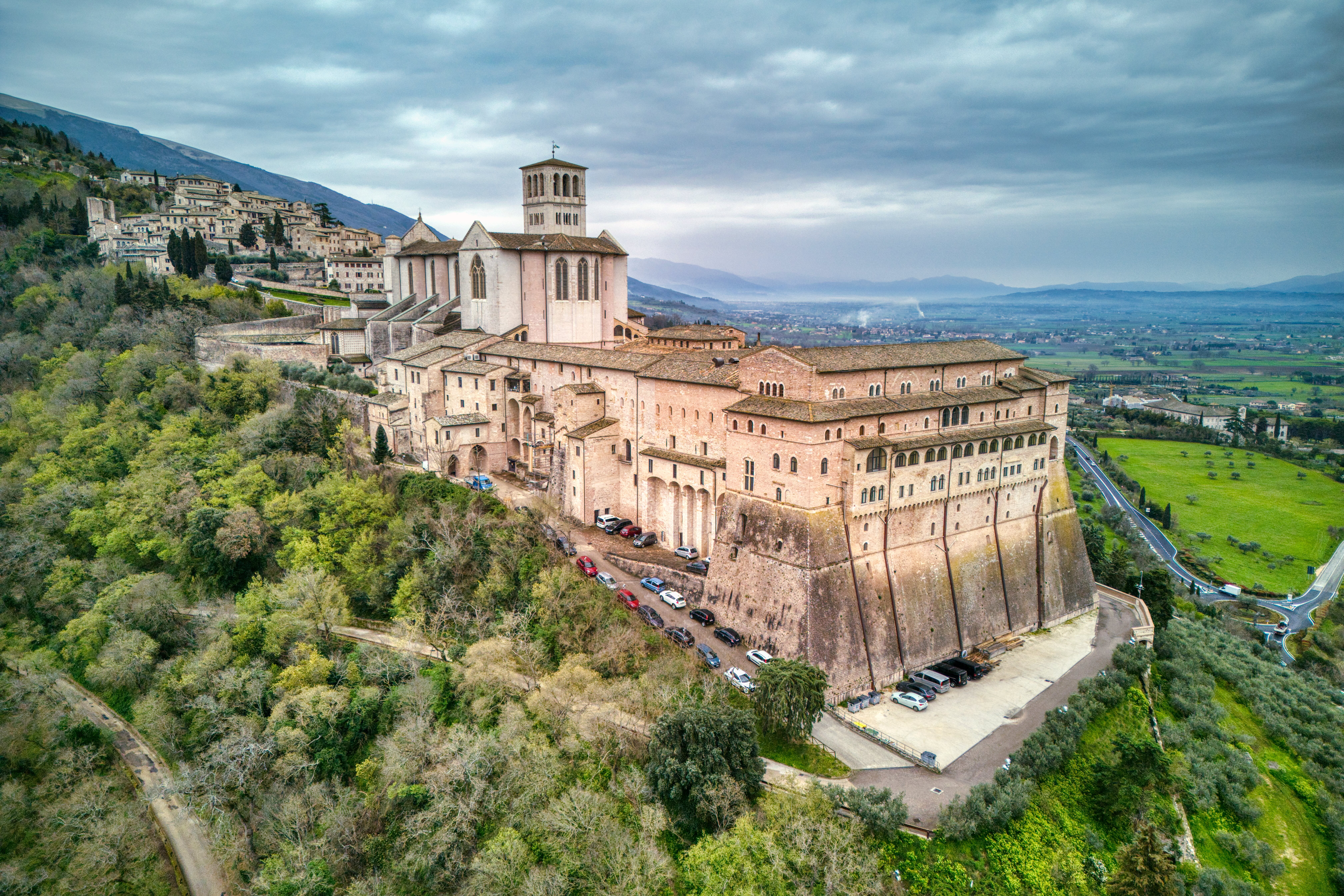
Rear viewed from the north-west

The Franciscan friary (Sacro Convento) and the Lower and Upper Basilicas (Italian: Basilica inferiore e superiore) of Francis of Assisi were begun in honor of this local saint, immediately after his canonization in 1228. Simone di Pucciarello donated the land for the church, a hill at the west side of Assisi, known as "Hill of Hell" (Italian: Colle d'Inferno) where previously criminals were put to death. Today, this hill is called "Hill of Paradise".

On 16 July 1228, Francis was canonized by Pope Gregory IX in Assisi, and the Pope laid the foundation stone of the new church the following day, although construction may already have been begun. The construction having been begun at his order, the Pope declared the church to be the property of the papacy. The church was designed by Maestro Jacopo Tedesco, who was in those days the most famous architect. The construction was supervised by Brother Elias of Cortona, one of the first followers of Saint Francis and the former Vicar General of the Order under Saint Francis. The Lower Basilica was finished in 1230. On Pentecost 25 May 1230, the remains of Saint Francis were brought in a solemn procession to the Lower Basilica from its temporary burial place in the church of San Giorgio (St. George), now the Basilica of Saint Clare of Assisi. The burial place was concealed for fear that St Francis' remains might be stolen and dispersed. The construction of the Upper Basilica was begun after 1239 and was completed in 1253. Both churches were consecrated by Pope Innocent IV in 1253.

Pope Nicholas IV, a former Minister-General of the Order of Franciscans, raised the church to the status of Papal Church in 1288. The Piazza del Loge, the square leading to the church, is surrounded by colonnades constructed in 1474. They housed the numerous pilgrims flocking to this church. In 1818, the remains of Saint Francis were rediscovered beneath the floor of the Lower Basilica. In the reign of Pope Pius VII the crypt was built so that the faithful might visit the burial place of the saint.

On 27 October 1986 and January 2002, Pope John Paul II gathered in Assisi with more than 120 representatives of different religions and Christian denominations for a World Day of Prayer for Peace.

=== Earthquake of 1997 ===
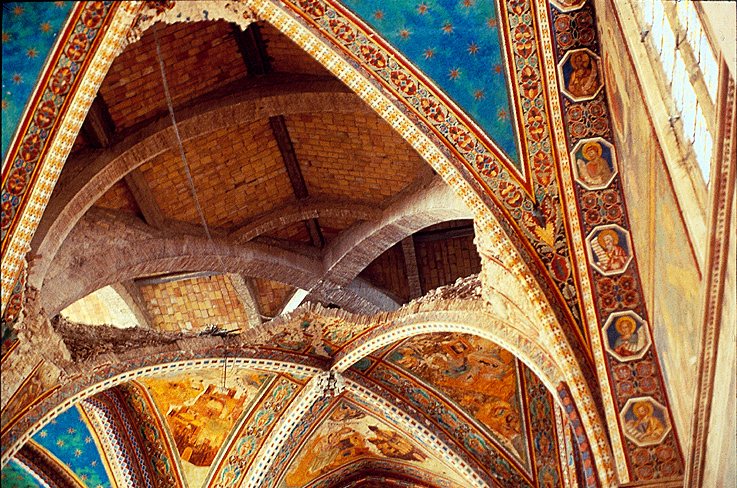
A view of the collapsed celling vault after the Earthquake

On the morning of September 26, 1997, two earthquakes hit the region around Assisi in rapid succession, registering 5.7 and 6.0 magnitude respectively. There was widespread devastation and many ancient buildings were destroyed or damaged. While a group of specialists and friars were inspecting the damage to the Basilica of Saint Francis, an aftershock shook the building, causing the collapse of the vault. Two Franciscan friars who were among the group and two of the specialists were killed. Much of the cycle of frescoes of the life of Saint Francis by Giotto in the Upper Church of the Basilica were slightly damaged whereas those of the sections of the vault which collapsed were almost entirely destroyed. The church was closed for two years for restoration. The collapse was captured on tape.

== Architecture ==
The church was designed by Maestro Jacopo Tedesco on two levels, each of which is consecrated as a church. They are known as the "Basilica superiore" (The Upper Basilica), generally called "The Upper Church" and the "Basilica inferiore" (The Lower Basilica), generally called "The Lower Church". The Lower Church was structurally a large crypt supporting the upper one. In the 19th century a lower crypt was constructed beneath the basilica. Architecturally, the exterior of the basilica appears united with the Friary of St. Francis, since the lofty arcades of the latter support and buttress the church in its apparently precarious position on the hillside.

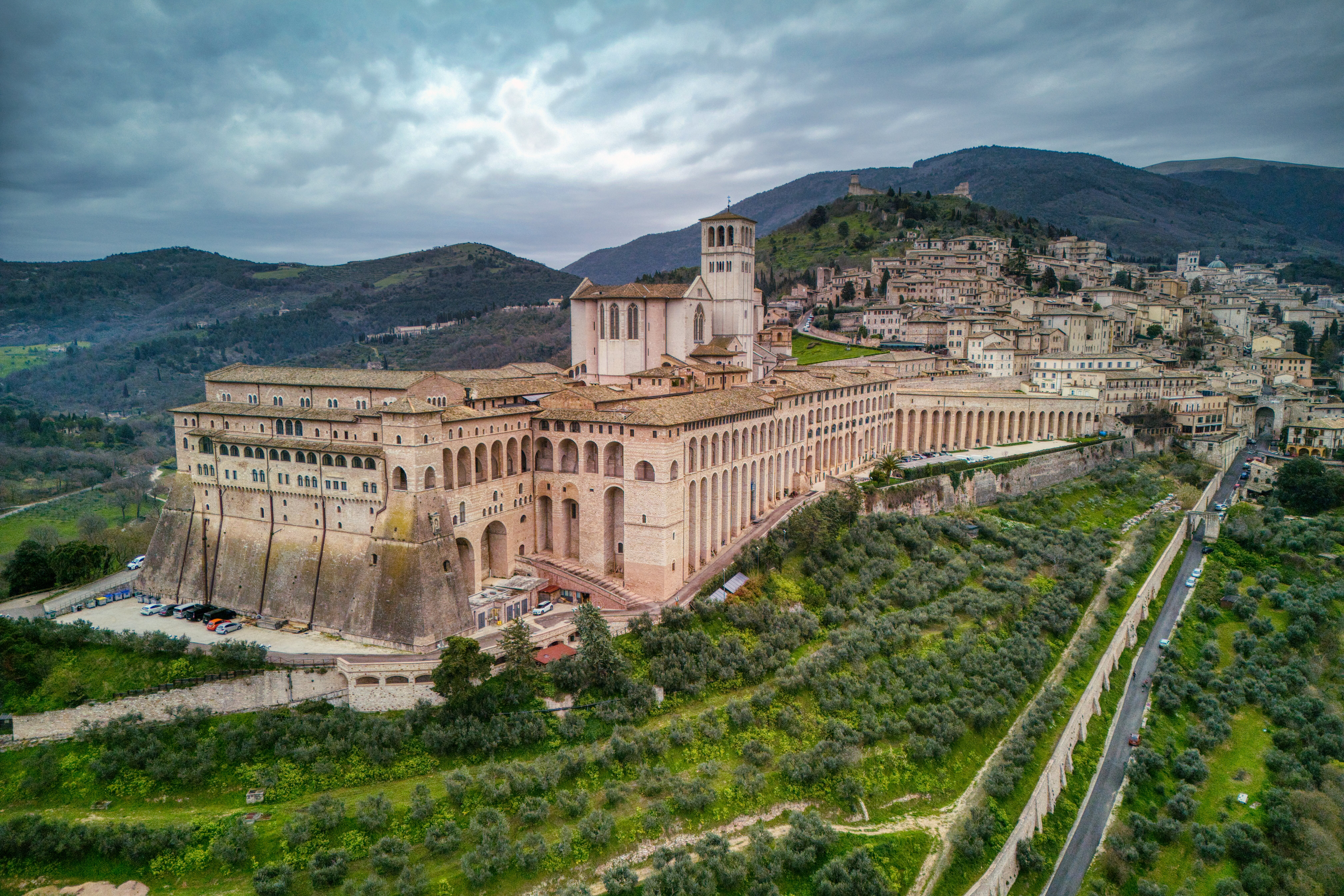
Papal Basilica of Saint Francis of Assisi

The architecture is a synthesis of the Romanesque and Gothic styles, and established many of the typical characteristics of Italian Gothic architecture. As originally built, both upper and lower churches had a simple cruciform plan with an aisle-less nave of four square bays, a square crossing, a transept that projected by half a bay on each side, and an apse, the lower being semicircular and the upper polygonal. To the left of the church stands a free-standing bell tower of Romanesque design.

The Lower Church was built entirely in the Romanesque style, having low semi-circular ribbed cross-vaults over the nave and barrel vaults over the transept arms. However, the space has been greatly extended with a number of lateral and transept chapels added between 1350 and 1400. The main entrance to the nave is through an ornate Gothic doorway built between 1280 and 1300, and later enclosed with a simple Renaissance style porch of 1487 by Francesco di Bartolomeo da Pietrasanta (d. 1494). Set in the tympanum of the Gothic doorway is an ornate rose window which has been called "the eye of the most beautiful church in the world"

The Upper Church has a façade of white-washed brick divided into two horizontal zones of about equal height, and with a simple gable of height equal to the lower zones. There is a single large doorway in the Gothic style, divided by a column and with a rose window set in the tympanum above the two cusped arches. Above the door, in the second zone is a large and ornate rose window in which most of the decorative details are Romanesque in style. Surrounding it are carved the symbols of the Four Evangelists, combining with the window to create a square composition. Above it in the gable is an ocular window. To the left of the façade and visible from both the forecourts of the Upper Church and the Lower Church is the Benediction Loggia in the Baroque style which was built in 1754, when the church was raised to the status of basilica.

Internally, the Upper Church maintains Brother Elias' original simple aisleless cruciform plan. Like the Lower Church, there is a nave of four bays with ribbed cross-vaulting. Unlike that of the Lower Church, it is only the diagonal ribs which are of semi-circular form. The transverse ribs are pointed in the Gothic manner, and thus rise to the full height of the wider diagonal ribs. Each group of ribs springs from a group of clustered columns. Externally the columns and vault are supported by stout buttresses of semi-circular plan. Unlike the Lower Church, the transepts also have ribbed vaulting.

There are tall Gothic windows with Geometric tracery in each bay of the nave and in the polygonal apse of the chancel. The windows of the apse are believed to have been created by German craftsmen active around Assisi at the end of the 13th century. The windows on the left hand side of the nave were made by a French workshop (1270), while those on the right hand side are attributed to the workshop of Maestro di San Francesco. These stained glass windows are among the best examples of 13th-century Italian glasswork.

As is characteristic of Italian church architecture, the main decorative feature, and the main medium used for conveying the Church's message is fresco, rather than stained glass. The earliest frescoes are some of those in the Lower Church. The work proceeded with a number of different projects and appears to have involved numerous artists, some of whom are as renowned as Cimabue and Giotto, but many of whom are no longer known by name.

== Upper Basilica ==
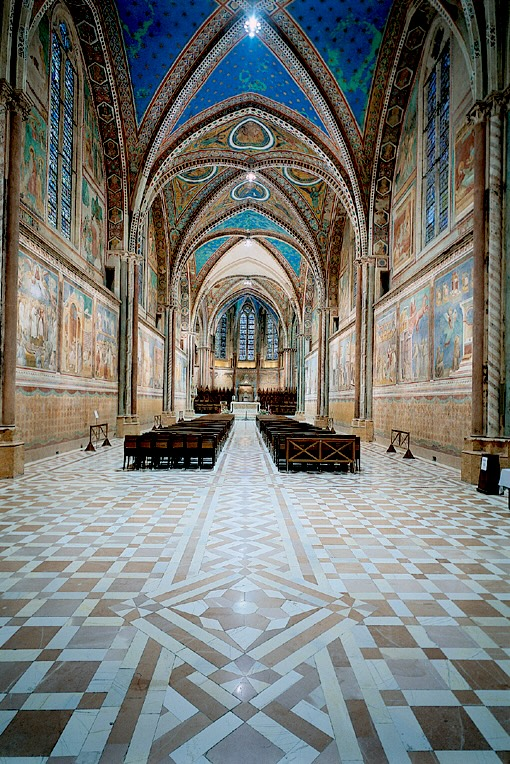
Nave of the upper basilica.

The basilica consists of a single four-bay nave with cross-vaulted ceiling, a transept and a polygonal apse. The four ribbed vaults are decorated alternately with golden stars on a blue background and figurative paintings. The second vault features roundels with busts of Christ facing Saint Francis and the Virgin facing Saint John the Baptist. The vault above the entrance gives us the Four Latin Doctors of the Church: St Gregory facing St. Jerome and Saint Ambrose facing St. Augustine. These are ascribed to the Isaac Master.

The choir has 102 wooden stalls with carvings and marquetry by Domenico Indovini (1501). In their centre, on a raised platform, stands the papal cathedra.

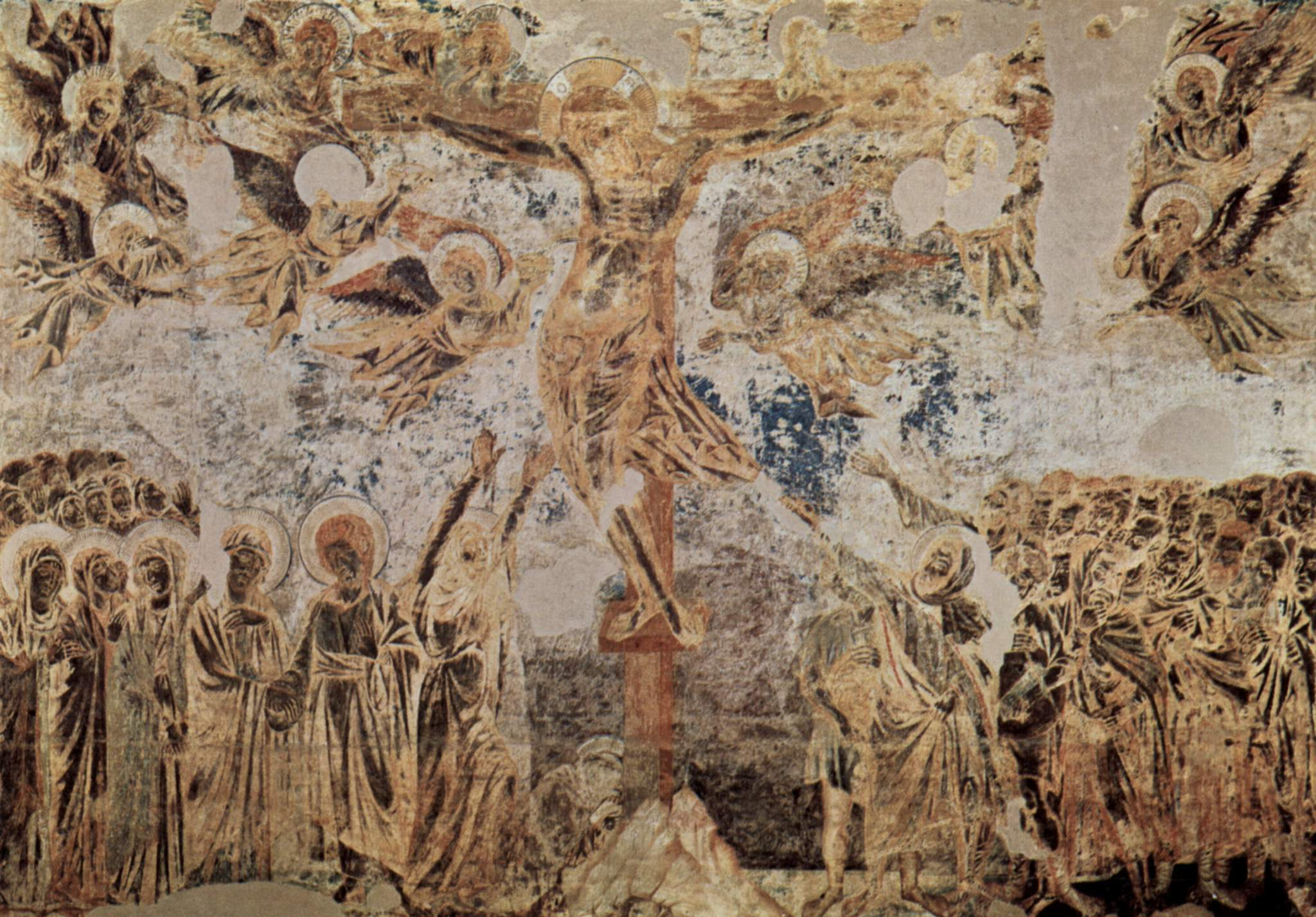
Crucifixion by Cimabue

The west end of the transept and the apse have been decorated with many frescoes by Cimabue and his workshop (starting in c. 1280). The magnificent Crucifixion, with Saint Francis on his knees at the foot of the Cross, stresses again the veneration of the Passion of Christ by Saint Francis. The frescoes of Cimabue soon suffered from damp and decay. Due to the use of lead oxide in his colours and to the fact that the colours were applied when the plaster was no longer fresh, they have deteriorated and have been reduced to photographic negatives.

Prior to him there had been some decorations in the upper right hand section of the transept by an (anonymous) Northern Master, probably an English artist (1267–1270). He realized the two lunettes and the roundels on the west wall with paintings of the Angel and the Apostles. Another (anonymous) master, the Roman Master, painted the Isaiah and the David and the remainder of the wall under the eastern lunette.

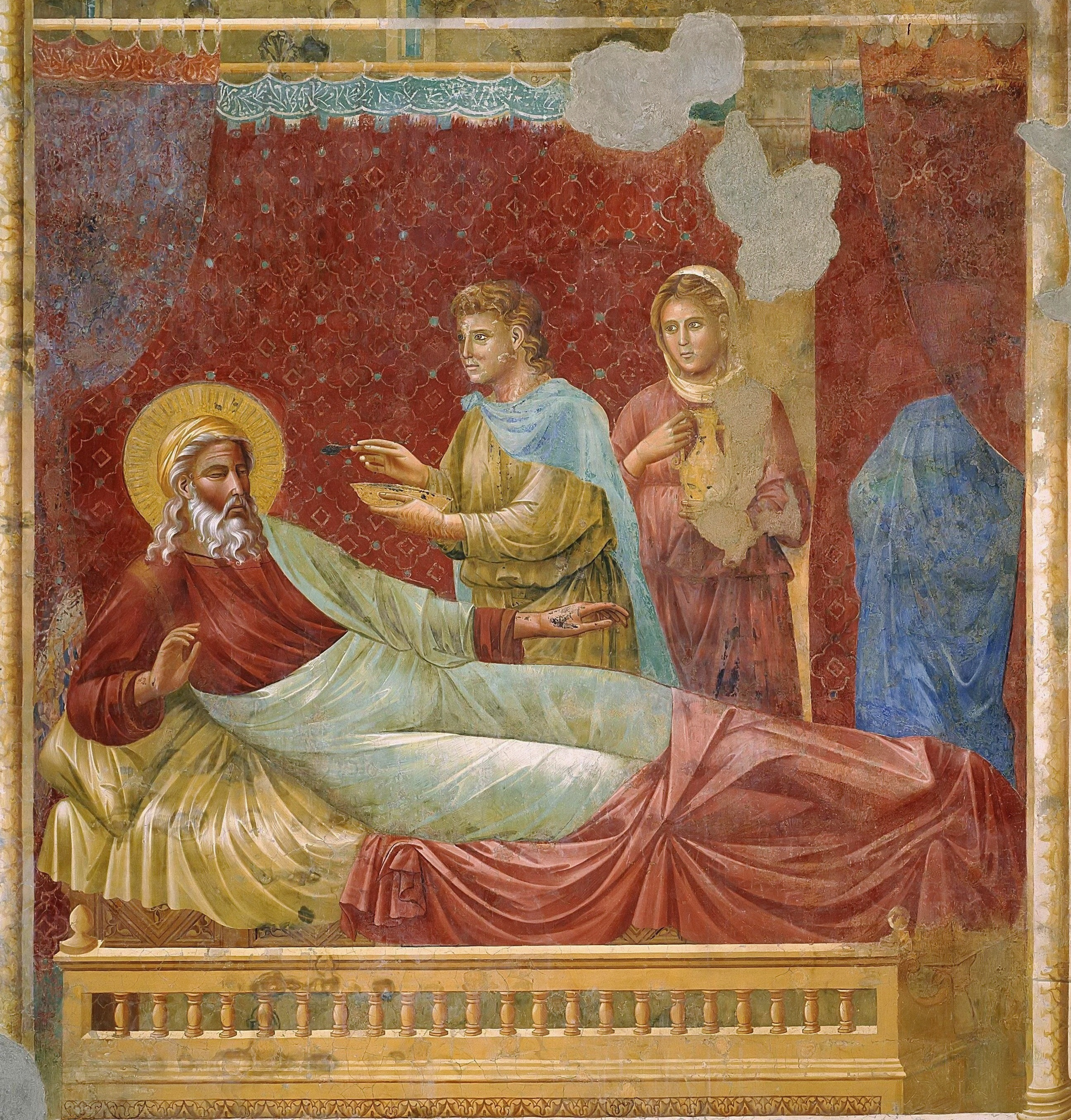
Isaac rejects Esau

The upper part on both sides of the nave, badly damaged by the earthquake of 1997, was decorated in two rows with in total 32 scenes from the Old Testament (starting with Creation of the World and ending with Joseph forgives his brothers) and the New Testament (from the Annunciation to The Women at the Tomb), while the upper register of the entrance wall is covered with two frescoes Pentecost and Ascension of Jesus. Since it took about six months to paint one bay of the nave, different Roman and Tuscan masters, followers of Cimabue, have performed this series of scenes such as Giacomo, Jacopo Torriti and Pietro Cavallini.

The two frescoes of the life of Isaac (Isaac blesses Jacob and Esau in front of Isaac) in the middle register of the third bay, are traditionally ascribed to the young Giotto (1290–1295) (previously wrongly ascribed to Cimabue by Vasari). But even this has been controversial. Many critics esteem these the work of the anonymous Isaac Master and his workshop. Deducing from stylistic details, attesting to his Roman background, some think that the Isaac Master may have been Pietro Cavallini or a follower. Pietro Cavallini had painted around 1290 a similar fresco Isaac blessing Jacob in the convent of the church Santa Cecilia in Trastevere in Rome. The position of the resting Isaac looks like the same position of the Virgin in Cavallini's mosaic Birth of the Virgin in the apse of the church Santa Maria in Trastevere in Rome. The Isaac Master is considered one of the first practitioners of the true fresco (buon fresco) technique, which revolutionized mural painting for the subsequent centuries.

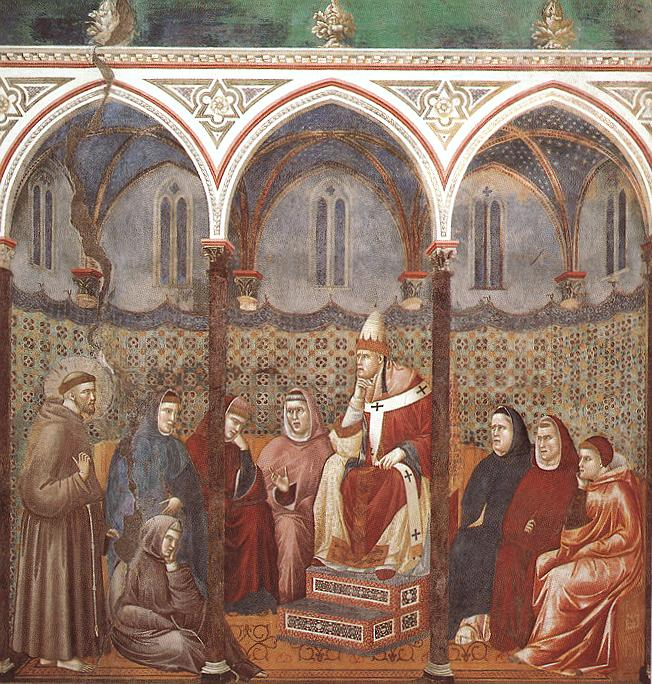
Saint Francis preaches in the presence of pope Honorius III

But the most important decorations are the series of 28 frescoes ascribed to the young Giotto along the lower part of the nave. Each bay contains three frescoes above the dado on each side of the nave, two frescoes in the east galleries beside the entrance, and two more on the entrance wall. Giotto used the Legenda Maior, the biography of Saint Francis by Saint Bonaventure (1266) to reconstruct the major events in the life of Saint Francis. The prototype for this cycle may have been the (now lost) Saint Francis cycle by Pietro Cavallini in the church San Francesco a Ripa in Rome. The paintings are as vivid as if Giotto had been a witness to these events. According to Vasari, they were executed in the period between 1296 and 1304.

However the authorship of Giotto is disputed, due to the ambiguous attributions given in early descriptions of this work. Many Italian critics continue to support the authorship of Giotto and his workshop. But because of small differences in style with the frescoes of Isaac, it is thought that several or even all of these frescoes were painted by at least three separate painters, using the original concept of Giotto : the Master of Legend of Saint Francis (the principal painter and probable supervisor of the cycle), the Master of the Obsequies of Saint Francis and the Cecilia Master.

The first span of the ceiling is decorated with frescoes of the "Four Doctors of the Church“ ( Jerome, Augustine, Gregory and Ambrose), attributed either to a young Giotto or to one of his followers. The third span presents four heart-shaped medallions of the Christ, Mary, John the Baptist and Francis, painted by Jacopo Torriti.

The cuspidate façade of the upper basilica has a portal in Gothic style with twin doors and a beautiful rose window.

There is a sculpture, Tau, by Guido Dettoni della Grazia, that is on permanent exhibition.

== Lower Basilica ==
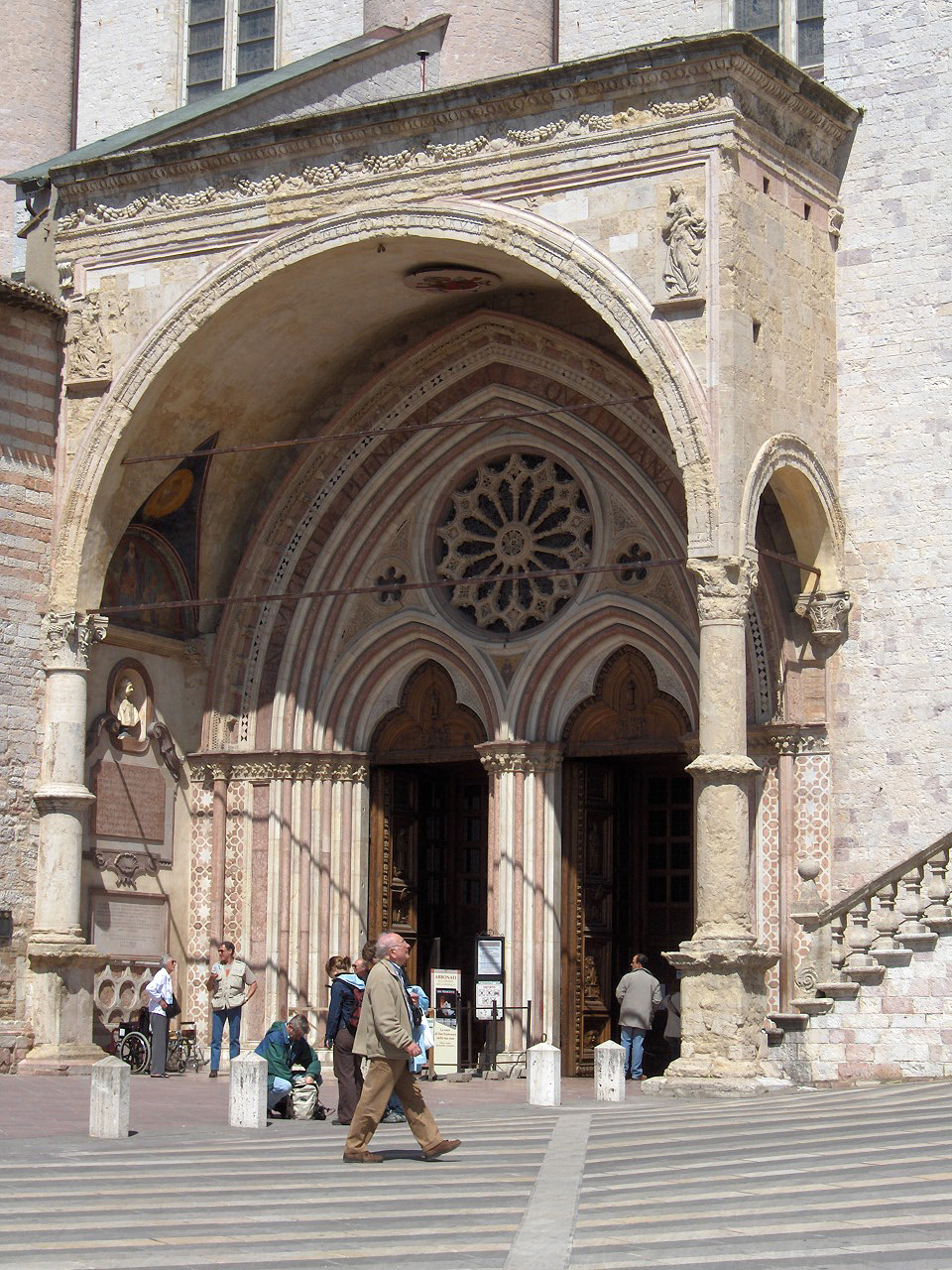
Side entrance to the lower basilica.

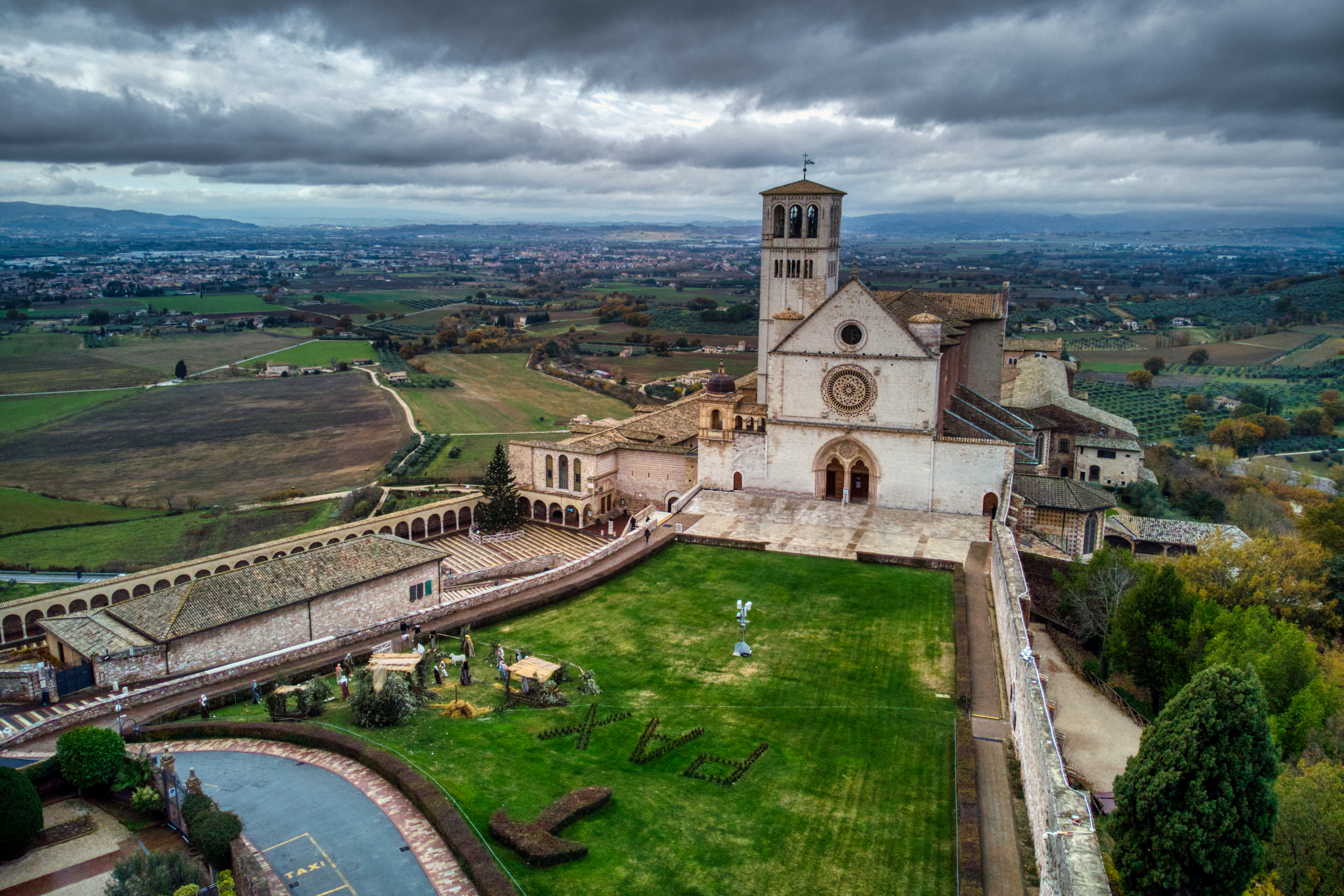
Front of the Upper Basilica.

Brother Elias had designed the lower basilica as an enormous crypt with ribbed vaults. He had acquired his experience by building huge sepulchres out of hard rock in Syria.

The doors are surmounted by a large rose window, flanked by two smaller ones, called "the eye of the most beautiful church in the world" The decorations on the left wooden door were executed by Ugolinuccio da Gubbio (c. 1550) and those on the right door by an anonymous Umbrian artist (1573). They portray stories from the lives of Saint Francis, Saint Clare, Saint Louis and Saint Anthony. On the left wall of the porch stands the bust of Pope Benedict XIV who granted this church the title of Patriarchal Basilica and Cappella Papale. Pope Benedict XVI's theological act in 2006 of renouncing the title of "Patriarch of the West" has had the consequence of the basilica changing its name to that of the Papal Basilica of St. Francis.

Entering the lower basilica, one sees at the other side of the vestibule the chapel of Saint Catherine of Alexandria, erected about 1270. It was enlarged by Gattapone da Gubbio and decorated at the expense of Cardinal Egidio Albornoz, papal legate in charge of the Papal States (from 1350 to 1367). He was initially buried here but his body was later transferred to Toledo, Spain. The frescoes with the eight episodes from the life of Saint Catherine were painted in 1368–1369 by 'Andreas pictor de Bononia'. This painter, called Andrea, is most probably Andrea de' Bartoli (c. 1349–1369), the court artist of Albornoz (and not Andrea da Bologna, as usually, but wrongly, attributed). The saints in this chapel were painted by Pace di Bartolo d'Assisi (1344–1368). The stained glass windows are the work of Giovanni di Bonino of Assisi (mid-14th century).

On the left side of the entrance is the small Chapel of St. Sebastian with a canvas by Giorgetti and episodes of the life of the saint on the walls painted c. 1646 by G. Martelli (Irene taking care of St. Sebastian; St. Sebastian before Domitian). The left wall of this chapel is decorated by some paintings by Ottaviano Nelli (15th century) and a painting of Saint Christopher (Umbrian School, 14th century).

On the right side of the entrance there are two monuments by anonymous artists: in the first span, the mausoleum of Giovanni de' Cerchi, surmounted by an early 14th-century porphyry vase (a gift of a queen of Cyprus) and the mausoleum of John of Brienne, king of Jerusalem and emperor-regent of Constantinople. Above this last burial monument stands a statue of the Blessed Virgin and on its left the figure of a crowned woman seated on a lion, made by Cosmatesco (1290).

The badly deteriorating frescoes on the walls and the vaults of the third section of this entrance are the work of Cesare Sermei and G. Martelli (1645). The chapel on the right side of the third section is dedicated to St. Anthony the Abbot. The niches in the wall contain the burial monuments of the Governor of Spoleto (by then part of the Papal States) Blasco Fernandez and his son Garcia, both assassinated in 1367 (anonymous local artist, 14th century).

The lower basilica consists of a central nave with several side chapels with semi-circular arches. The nave is decorated with the oldest frescoes in the church by an unknown artist, called Maestro di San Francesco. They feature five scenes from the Passion of Christ on the right side, while on the left side equally five scenes from the Life of St. Francis. By this juxtaposition, the Franciscans wanted to contribute to the idea of their founder as a second Christ.

They are connected by a low blue-painted ceiling decorated with golden stars. Most images on the lower walls have decayed to leave almost no trace, except on the right wall fragments of Virgin and Child with an Angel by Cimabue.

These frescoes, executed in tempera on dry plaster, were completed about 1260–1263. They are considered by many as the best examples of Tuscan wall paintings prior to Cimabue. As the popularity of this church increased, side chapels for noble families were added between 1270 and 1350, destroying the frescoes on the opened walls.

The first chapel on the left is the San Martino Chapel, dedicated to Saint Martin of Tours. It was built by the Franciscan Cardinal Gentile Portino da Montefiore and was decorated between 1317 and 1319 with ten frescoes depicting the saint's life by Simone Martini. This dedication most likely referred to the Cardinal's position as Cardinal-Priest of the Basilica of St. Martin "ai Monti" in Rome, and was intended to be his burial place. It was probably incomplete at the time of Montefiore's death (October 1312), thus he was interred in the neighboring Chapel of St. Louis. Martini also painted a triptych depicting the Madonna and Child with Two Hungarian Royal Saints with a row of five attendant saints in the St. Elizabeth Chapel (southern arm of the transept). These are among the greatest Martini's works and the finest examples of 14th-century painting. Over time, however, his use of lead paint has led to the darkening of several sections of these works.

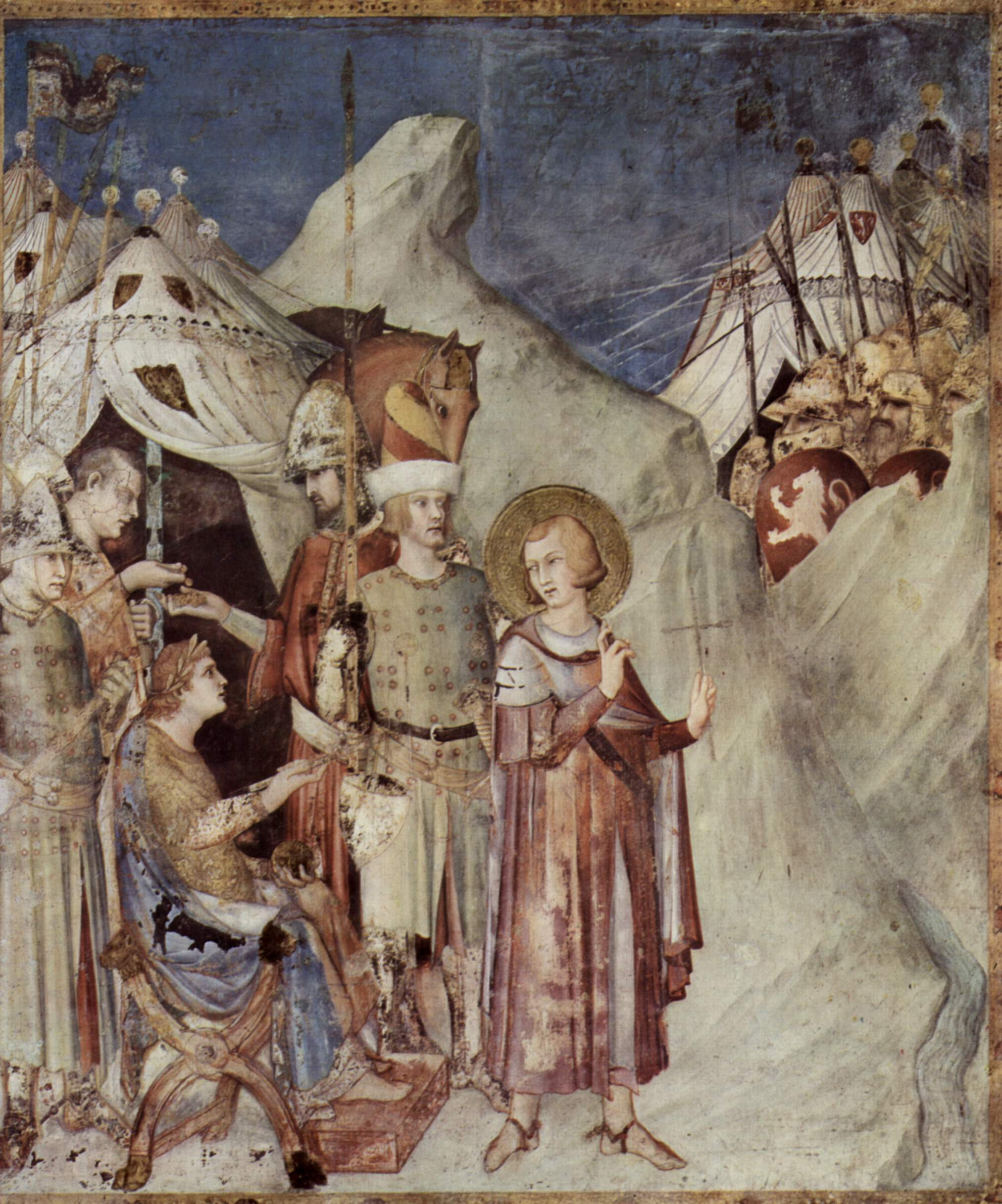
Saint Martin leaves the life of chivalry and renounces the army (fresco by Simone Martini) in the San Martino Chapel.

The other chapel on the left is dedicated to St. Peter of Alcantara.

The chapels on the right are dedicated to Saints:

- Louis of Toulouse and Stephen I of Hungary, with frescoes by Dono Doni (1575) and stained glass, attributed to Simone Martini.
- Anthony of Padua, with frescoes by Cesare Sermei (1610).
- Mary Magdalene. This chapel, built by Teobaldo Pontano (the Bishop of Assisi from 1296 to 1329), contains some of the best works of the workshop of Giotto and maybe by the Master himself (about 1320). (It was wrongly attributed by Vasari to Puccio Capanna.) On the lateral walls are scenes from the Life of Mary Magdalene (above the portrait of Teobaldo Pontano), while in the vault there are roundels with busts of Christ, the Virgin, Mary Magdalene and Lazarus.

The nave ends in a richly decorated semicircular apse, preceded with a transept with barrel vaulting.

The frescoes in the right transept depict the childhood of Christ, partly by Giotto and his workshop and the Nativity by the anonymous Maestro di San Nicola. The lowest level shows three frescoes representing St. Francis posthumously intervening in favour of two children. These frescoes by Giotto were revolutionary in their time, showing real people with emotions, set in a realistic landscape.

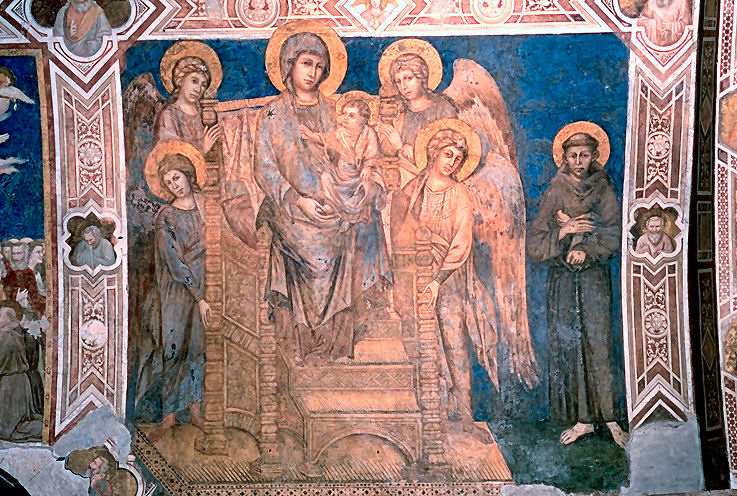
Maestà with Saint Francis, by Cimabue.

On the transept wall Cimabue painted an image of Our Lady enthroned and Saint Francis (1280). This is probably the nearest likeness existing, showing the actual appearance of Saint Francis. This static painting in Gothic style is in stark contrast with the lively frescoes of Giotto.

This Chapel of Saint Nicholas of Bari, at the northern end of the transept, was commissioned by the papal legate Cardinal Napoleone Orsini and it contains the tomb of the cardinal's brother, Giovanni Orsini, who died between 1292 and 1294. The funerary monument is set in a niche above the altar, with the recumbent effigy of a young man placed inside a mortuary chamber and flanked by two angels. The reliefs were carved by an Umbrian sculptor, probably of local origin. Between the tomb and the stained glass window appears a frescoed triptych attributed to Giotto's school, representing the Madonna and Child with Saint Francis and Nicholas. The cycle decorating the walls of the chapel, completed by 1307, comprises twelve scenes painted on the ceiling and on the walls illustrating the life and miracles of St Nicholas A scene of the chapel's dedication is painted above the arch of the entrance on the southern wall: the Redeemer receives the homage of Giovanni Orsini, presented by St. Nicholas, and of Napoleone Orsini, presented by Saint Francis. The stained glass windows show Cardinal Napoleone presented to Christ in the summit and his brother presented to Saint Nicholas in the zone below. At the southern end of the transept cardinal Orsini commissioned another chapel, dedicated to St John the Baptist, which was probably originally built for the tomb of Napoleone Orsini himself, but the cardinal was never buried there and the tomb remained empty. The parallel architectural arrangement of both Orsini chapels suggests that they were conceived together. However, the decorations of the chapel dedicated to Saint John the Baptist were never finished. Pietro Lorenzetti (or his workshop) executed a frescoed triptych with a Madonna and Child with Saints John the Baptist and Francis.

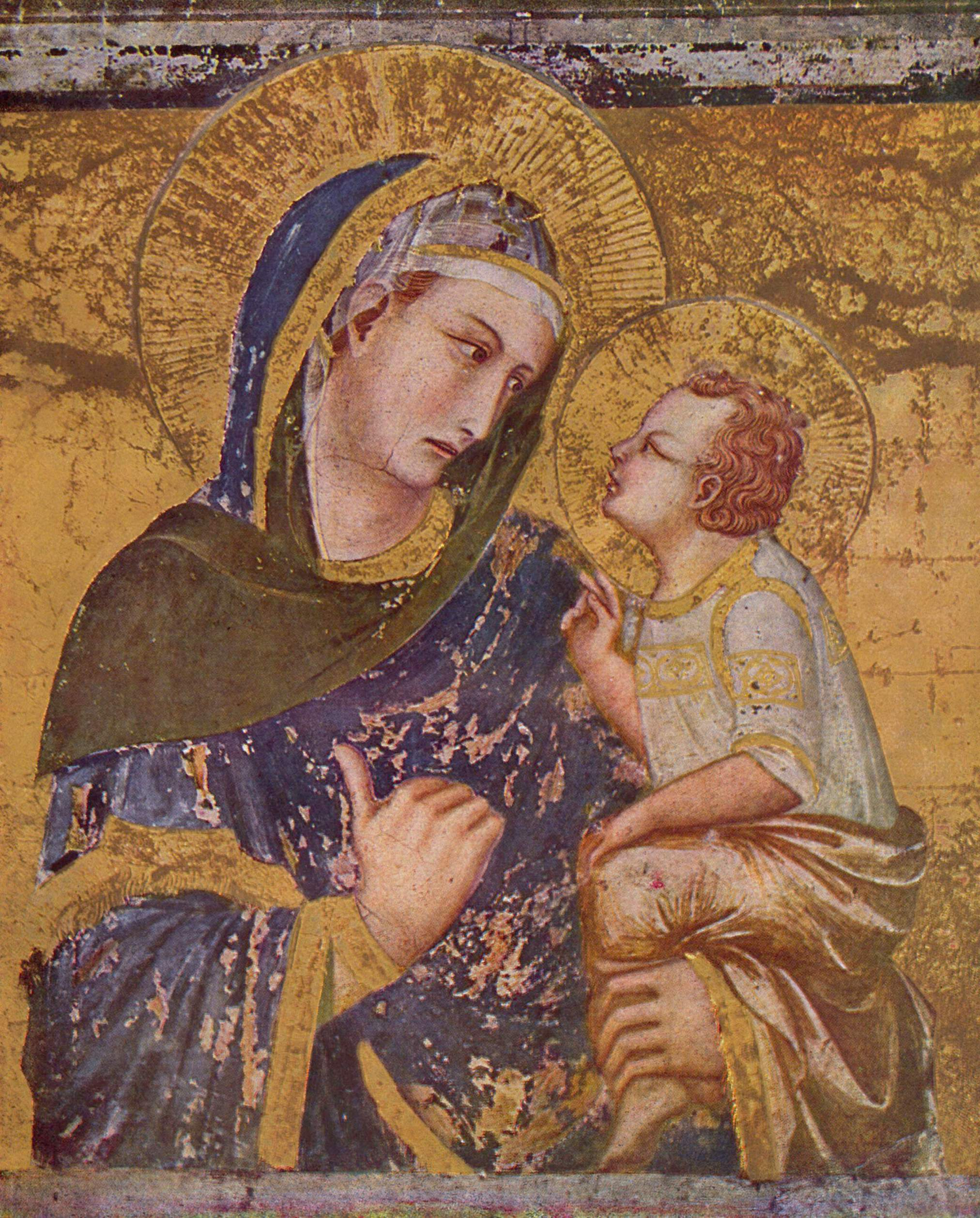
14th century Madonna dei Tramonti by Pietro Lorenzetti on canvas.

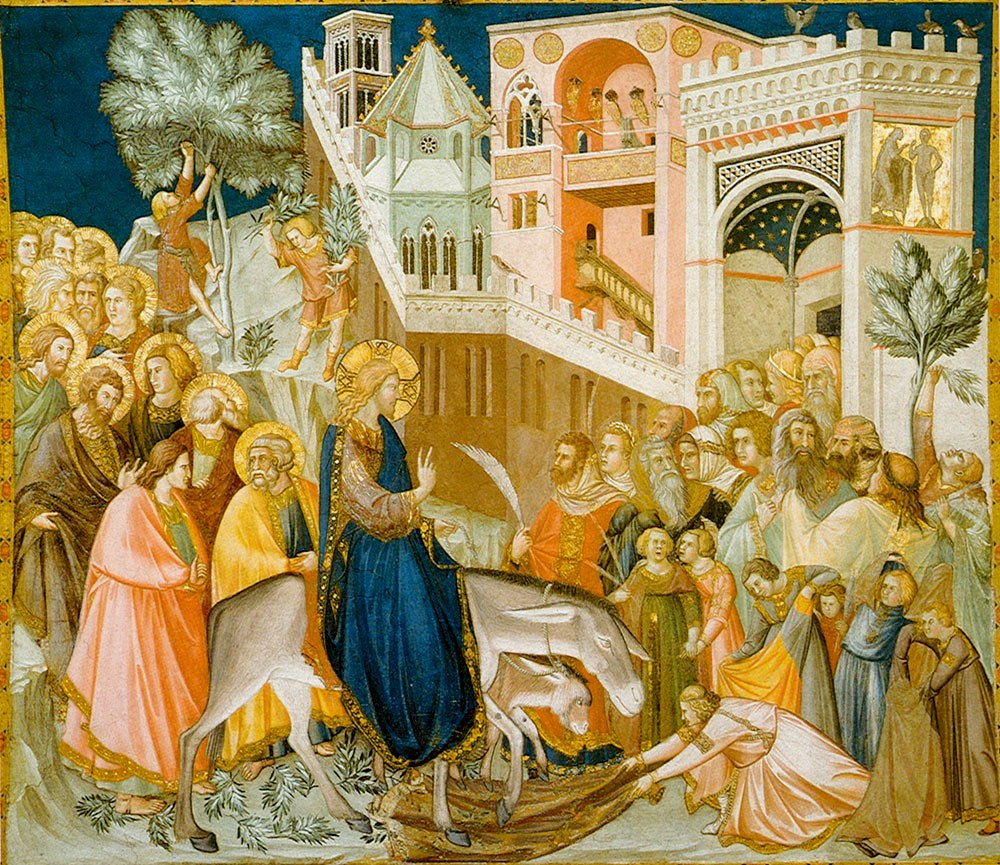
Christ's entry into Jerusalem, by Pietro Lorenzetti

The left transept was decorated by the Sienese painter Pietro Lorenzetti and his workshop between 1315 and 1330 (attributed by Vasari to Pietro Lorenzetti and also (wrongly) to Giotto and Puccio Capanna). This cycle of tempera frescoes are his masterworks. They depict six scenes from the Passion of Christ. The fresco of Deposition of the Cross is especially emotional. There were about 330 work-stages needed to complete this cycle. Beneath the monumental "Crucifixion" scene, Pietro Lorenzetti has executed a fresco of the Madonna and Child, accompanied by Saints John the Evangelist and Saint Francis (the so-called Madonna dei Tramonti). The fresco is accompanied by a frescoed niche containing the liturgical implements and a fictive bench.

The juxtaposition of the Childhood and the Passion frescoes emphasizes the parallel between the passion of Christ and the compassion of St. Francis.

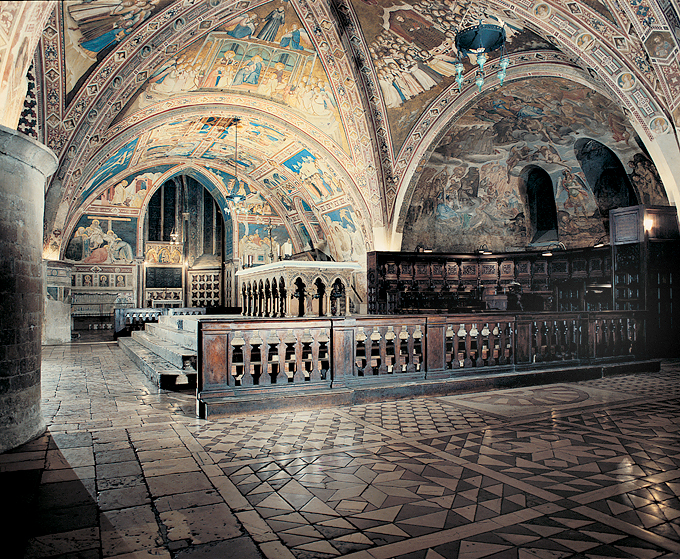
Papal altar with frescoes

The papal altar in the apse was made out of one block of stone from Como in 1230. Around the altar are a series of ornamented Gothic arches, supported by columns in different styles. The fine Gothic walnut choir stalls were completed in 1471 by Apollonio Petrocchi da Ripatransone, with the help of Tommaso di Antonio Fiorentino and Andrea da Montefalco.

Once featuring frescoes depicting an allegory of the Crucifixion by Stefano Fiorentino (destroyed in 1622), the walls of the apse are now covered with a "Last Judgment" by Cesare Sermei di Orvieto (1609–1668).

The paintings in the lunettes of the vaults (1315–20) depict the Triumph of St Francis and three allegories of Obedience, Poverty and Chastity by the so-called Maestro delle Vele (Master of the Assisi vaults), a pupil of Giotto (about 1330).

The stained glass windows in this lower basilica are attributed to Giovanni di Bonino and his workshop.

== Crypt ==
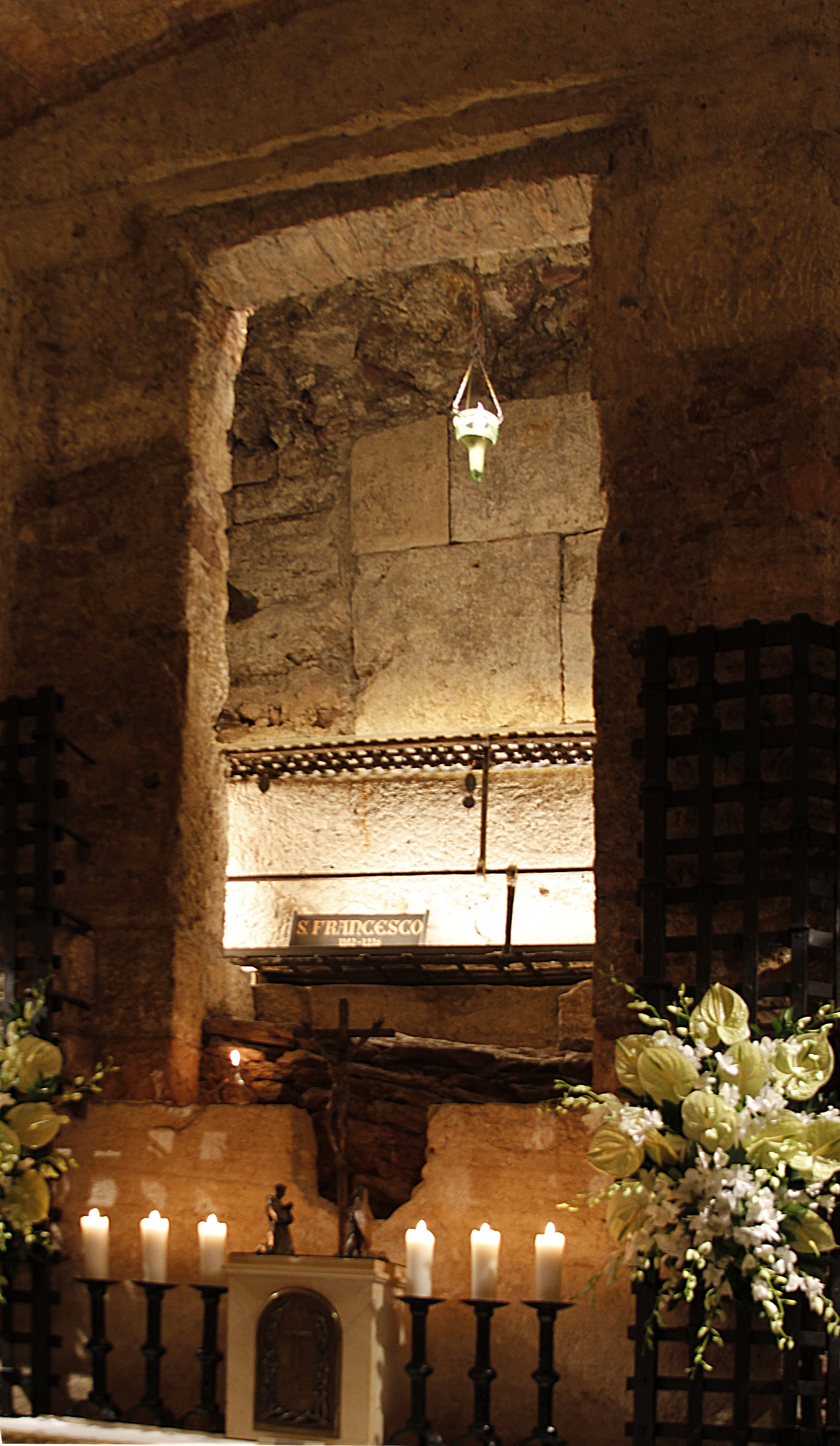
Tomb of Saint Francis in the crypt

Halfway down the nave one can descend into the crypt via a double stairway. This burial place of Saint Francis was found in 1818. His remains had been hidden by Brother Elias to prevent the spread of his relics in medieval Europe, a story told by Jon M. Sweeney in The Enthusiast. By order of Pope Pius VII a crypt was built under the lower basilica. It was designed by Pasquale Belli with precious marble in neo-classical style. But it was redesigned in bare stone in neo-Romanesque style by Ugo Tarchi between 1925 and 1932.

The ancient stone coffin with iron ties is enshrined in an open space above the altar. In 1934 his most faithful brothers were entombed in the corners of the wall around the altar: Brother Rufino, Brother Angelo, Brother Masseo and Brother Leo.

At the entrance of the crypt, an urn with the remains of Jacopa dei Settesoli was added to the crypt. This woman of Roman nobility, affectionately referred to as "Brother Jacoba", was the most faithful friend and benefactress of Saint Francis. She was at his side in the Porziuncola at the hour of his death.

== Friary of Saint Francis ==
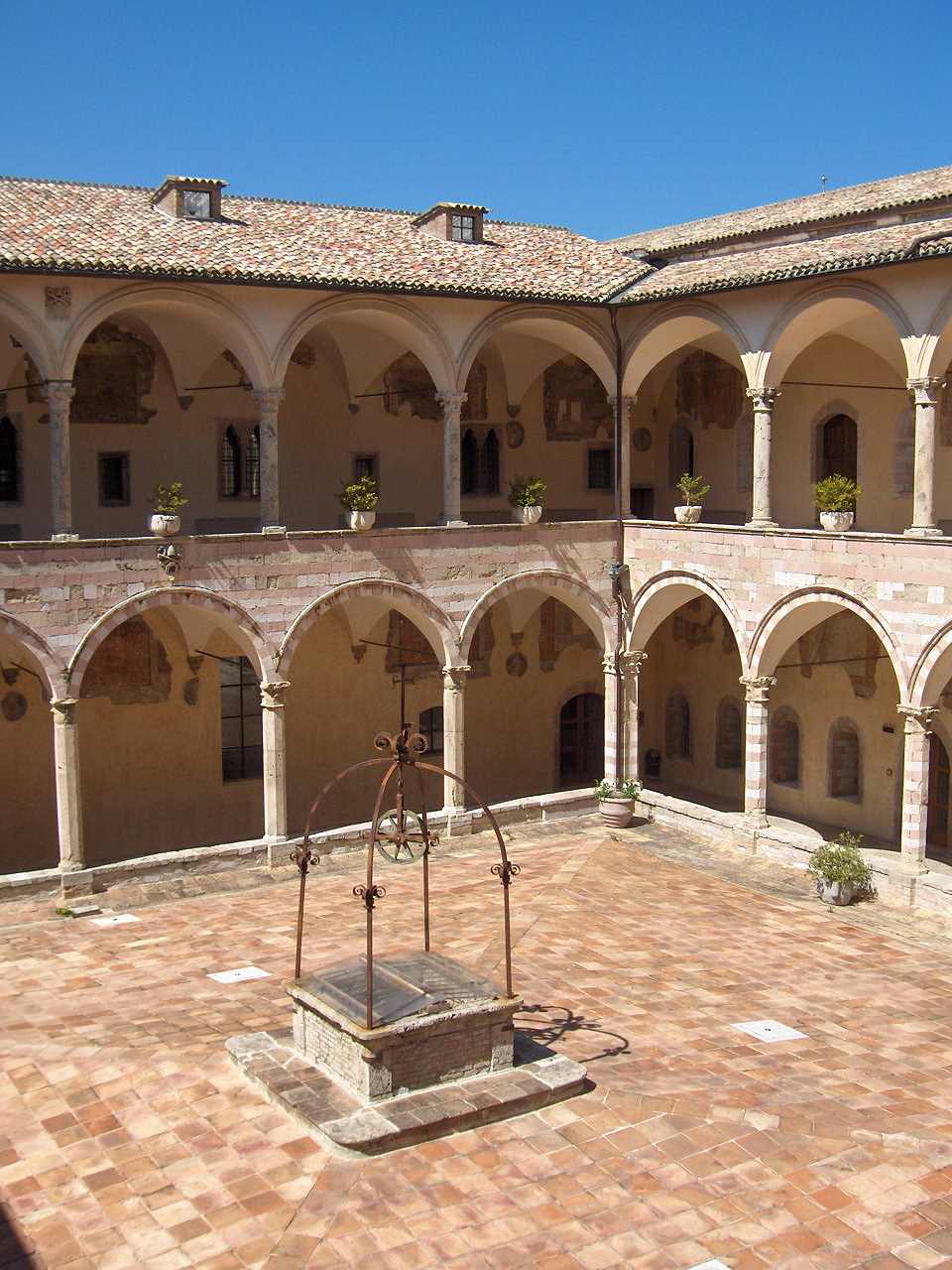
Courtyard of the friary

Next to the basilica stands the Sacro Convento friary with its imposing walls with 53 Romanesque arches and powerful buttresses supporting the whole complex. It towers over the valley below, giving the impression of a fortress. It was built with pink and white stone from Mount Subasio. It was already inhabited by the friars in 1230. But construction took a long time, with as result different styles intermingling : Romanesque with Gothic style. A major part was built under the reign of Pope Sixtus IV, a Franciscan, between 1474 and 1476.

The friary now houses a vast library (with medieval codices and incunables), a museum with works of art donated by pilgrims through the centuries and also the 57 works of art (mainly of Florentine and Sienese schools) of the Perkins collection.

The belfry, in Romanesque style, was finished in 1239.

== Other burials ==
- Giovanna of Italy
- John of Brienne

== See also ==
- Italian Gothic architecture
- Basilica of Saint Mary of the Angels in Assisi
- Basilica of San Francisco (La Paz)
