= Madonna dei Tramonti =

Fresco by Pietro Lorenzetti

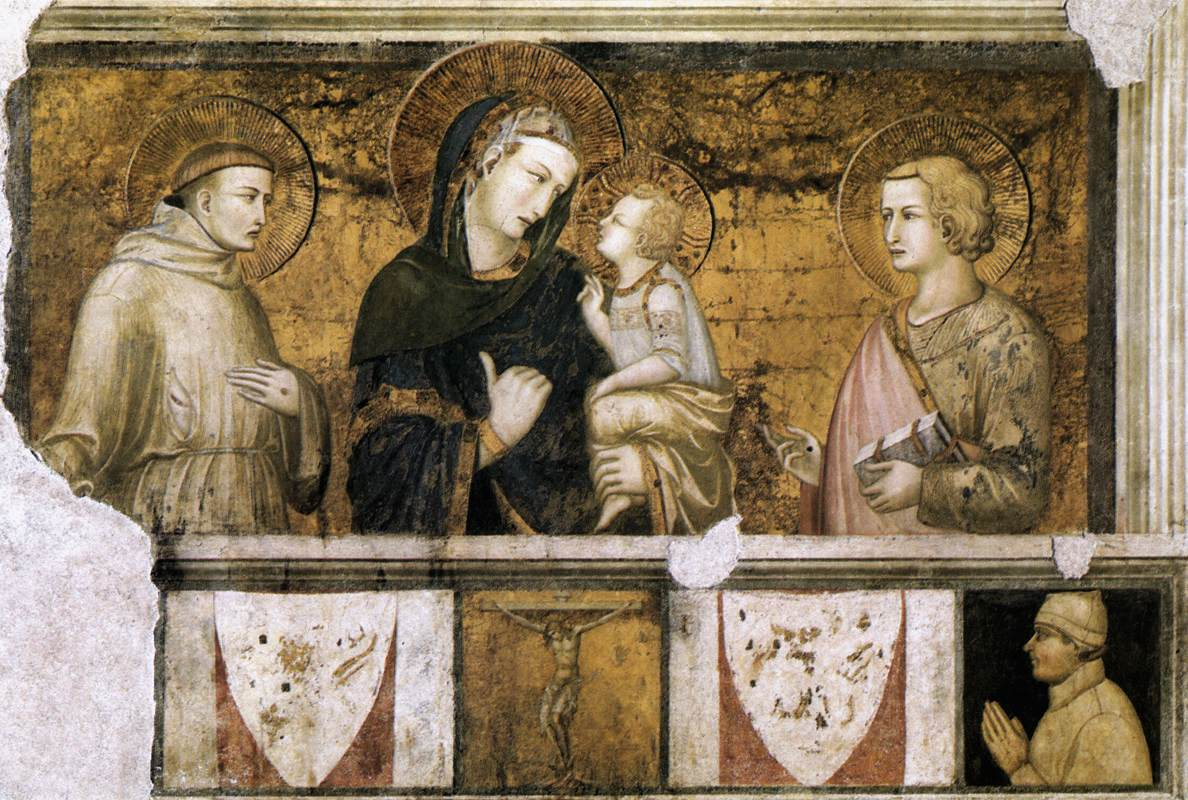
Madonna dei Tramonti by Pietro Lorenzetti

Madonna dei Tramonti is a fresco by the Italian artist Pietro Lorenzetti. It was in the Basilica of San Francesco d'Assisi, in Assisi, Italy, although now it is under private ownership.

The fresco is accompanied by a frescoed niche containing the liturgical implements.
