= Northern Master =

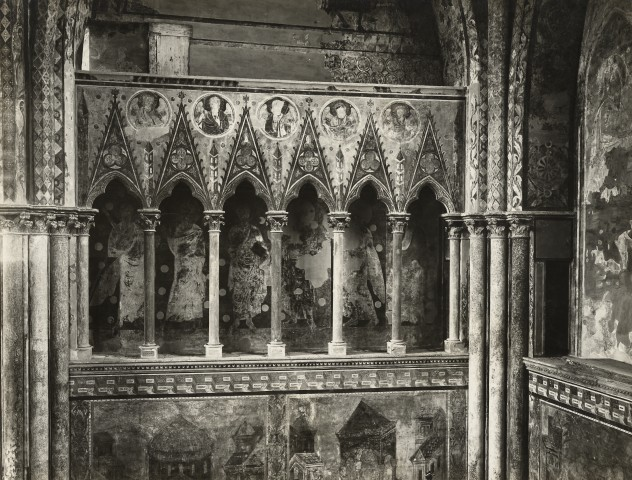
The left loggia of the north transept in the Upper Church at the Basilica of St Francis in Assisi

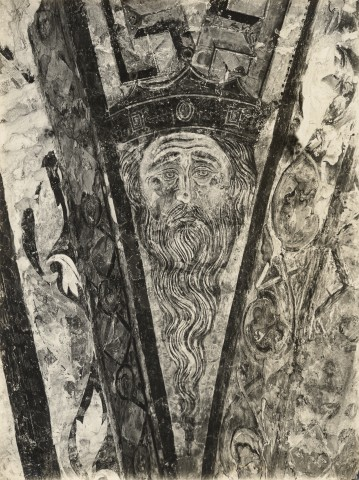
Mascherone

The Northern Master was an anonymous artist in the late 13th century who worked in the Upper Church of the Basilica of Saint Francis of Assisi. Although his precise origin is unknown, he is thought to be of French, German, or English origin. He and his assistants played a critical role in painting by merging northern Gothic and Italian influences in the frescoes. Also attributed to him are the designs for some of the stained glass windows.

== Works ==
The Northern Master worked in the Upper Church of the Basilica of Saint Francis in Assisi at roughly the same time as Cimabue did, decorating the upper part of the north transept. The style of the work is markedly Gothic, perhaps French, German, or English, and for this the artist is referred to as the Northern Master (called in Italian either the Maestro Oltremontano, "master from over the mountains" or the Maestro Oltralpe, "master from over the Alps").

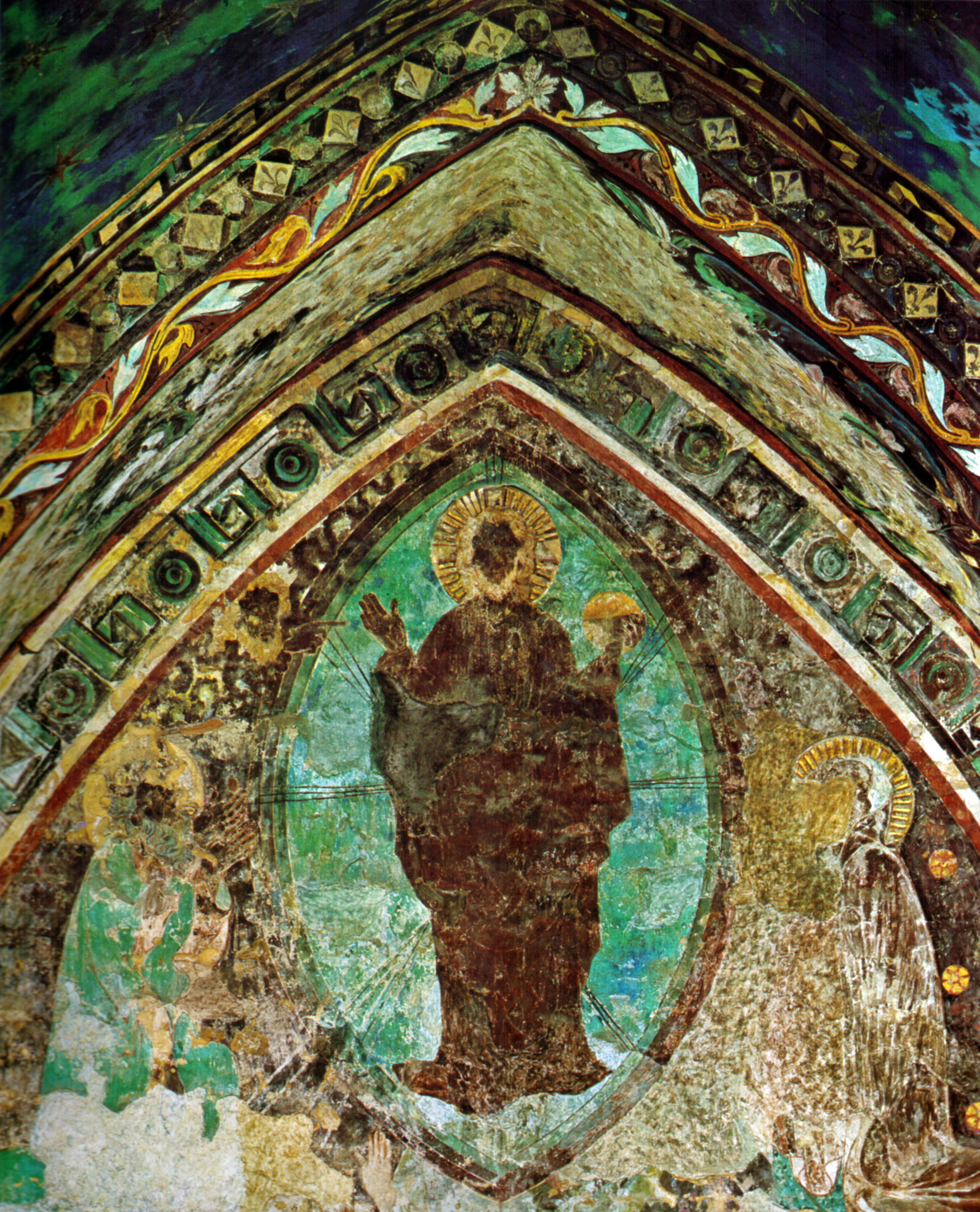
The Northern Master's Transfiguration

Attributed to him are two large lunettes (containing images of the Transfiguration and Saint Luke kneeling next to a throne); all the work in the left loggia (with busts of angels in clipeuses and life-sized figures of saints and prophets behind the columns); and various decorative elements (perhaps entrusted to his assistants) with geometric and floral motifs found underneath the arches of the lunettes, stained glass windows, and columns. Sometimes also attributed to him are the decorative bands of the vaults, in particular the masks near the joints on the pilasters, as well as the remains of the two grand figures in the niches (Isaiah and David) flanking the stained glass windows at the head of the transept along with the two painted rosettes above them. The work in the right loggia is generally attributed one of the Roman masters.

The Northern Master's work (unfortunately much damaged) is particularly important not only for its quality of painting but even more so because it represents a bridge between the purely Gothic style from over the Alps (in France, England, and Germany) and the Italian schools (in Assisi, Florence, and Rome). In a few places his work is patently Gothic (in an epoch in which this style had only just taken root in Italian architecture); in other areas it demonstrates an assimilation of elements from Roman culture (as in the acanthus leaves with their classical flavor, found underneath the arches of the windows); and yet other areas show an exclusively Roman influence tied to a collaborator and successor.

Cimabue himself also appears to have been inspired by this Gothic influence, especially in the decorative bands and motifs, and to a certain scale and fluency in design. Some art historians even hypothesize that the two artists worked together in the lower register of the apse (the Annunciation of Joachim and his offering, the angels holding vases at the bases of the Four Evangelists in the vaults, and the Crucifixion in the left transept).

== Style ==
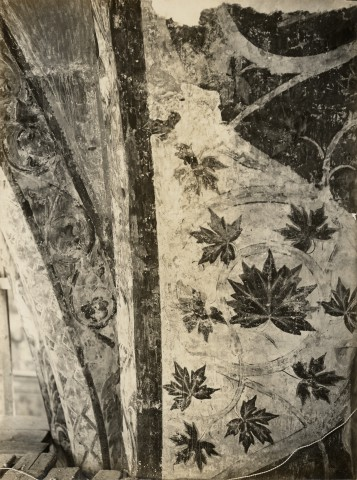
Leaf motifs under the arches of the lunettes in the right transept

The profile of spires and pinnacles drawn over the small trefoil arches of the loggia in itself indicates a clear adhesion to Gothic culture. There is a particular dialogue established in the frescoes between these painted details and the real architectonic elements, that produce the window frames made with columns and arches that create the spaces into which the frescoed prophets are inserted. The loggias have created a series of painted niches, behind a gallery of real columns, which do not always correspond: a feature previously seen only in the Sancta Sanctorum of St. John Lateran (rediscovered in the middle of the 20th century) which perhaps suggests that the artist was at some point in Rome where he distinguished himself and was then enlisted by Nicholas IV to assist in the Assisi decoration.

The idea of painting that not only imiates, but that is engaged enough to actually alter its environment, was then a novelty in an area normally accessible to the public and would have far-reaching consequences in later works of art.

Another characteristic of the Northern Master can be found in his figures, which are physiologically individualized. This can be seen in the way the masks at the bases of the vaults are treated, or in the figures of saints and prophets in the left loggia. Inspired by the decorative designs found in the French enamels, which contain spiraling leaves and vines, the artist clearly owes a debt to classical culture for the presence of meander and rhombus, with acanthus leaves also present.

Oil paint, at the time a predominantly northern medium, was also found to have been used by this artist in Assisi. In addition to the paintings, the design of some of the stained glass windows, also a chiefly northern medium, are attributed to him.

== Critics ==
Some critics (for example Henry Thode, Josef Strzygowski, Bernard Berenson, and Federico Zeri) believe no such artist as the Northern Master existed, attributing everything to Cimabue and his school on the basis of what Vasari indicated.

It was Aubert who first noted the decidedly gothic aspect of the work in this portion of the transept, connecting it to the style seen in the stained glass windows (constructed in part by French and German artists). Luigi Coletti followed, insisting on a connection to Sainte-Chapelle in Paris based on the peculiarly harsh color scheme of this part of the frescos (golds, dark reds, turchini, etc.). He wrote: "The style is rigorously linear; and this is very clear in the figurative parts, where the volumes appear resolved in many flat layers". Brandi in 1951 spoke of a painter "transalpino" for the Transfiguration, without hypothesizing for any specific nationality. Ultimately, the question of the artist's origin is one that has been extremely difficult to resolve, even if some studies have indicated points of contact with details in the stained glass windows that are decidedly German in taste, or in the other frescoes, like those in the Nonnberg Abbey in Salzburg where the figures have a similar design and the faces a similar composition.
