= Jacopo Torriti =

Italian painter

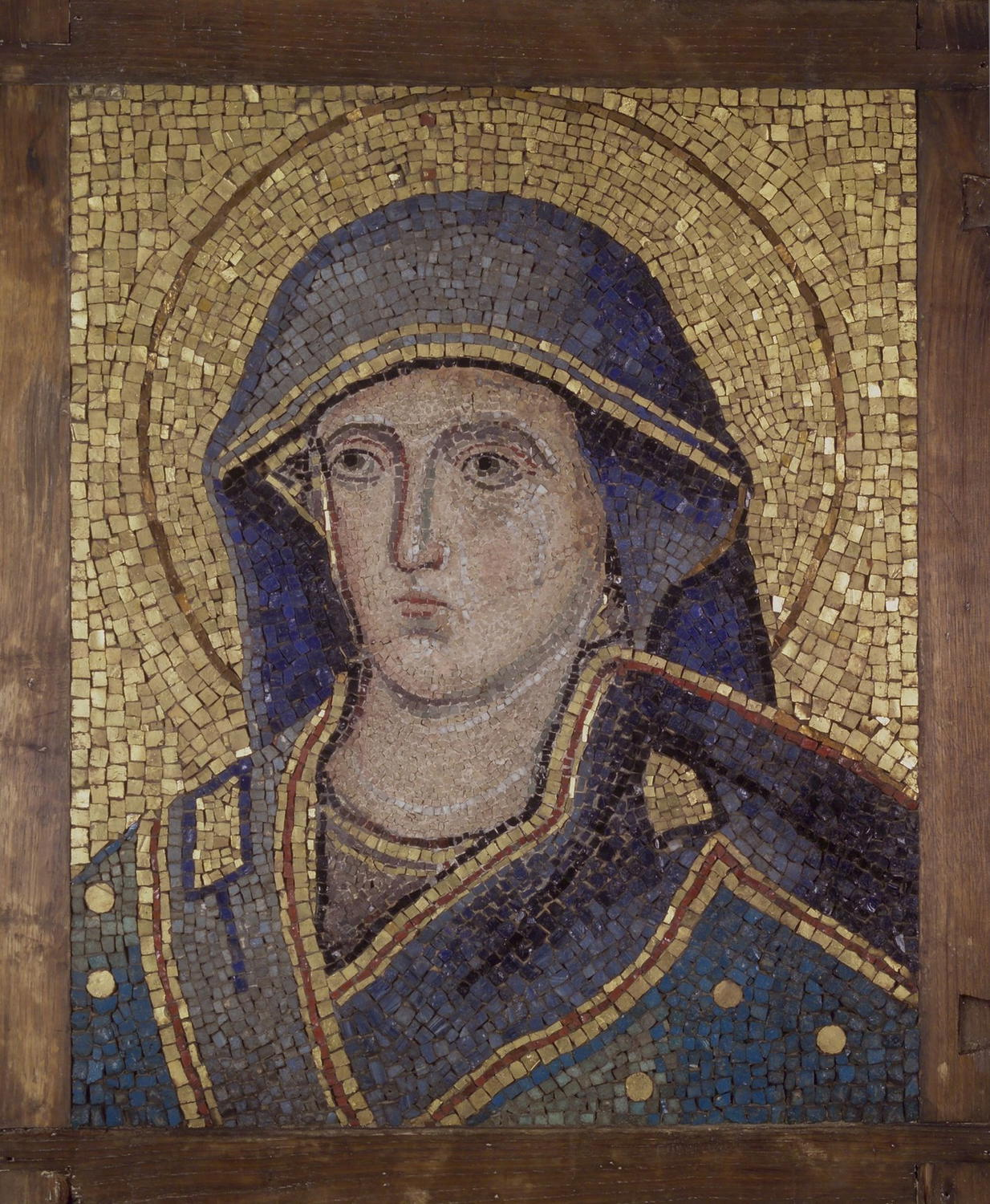

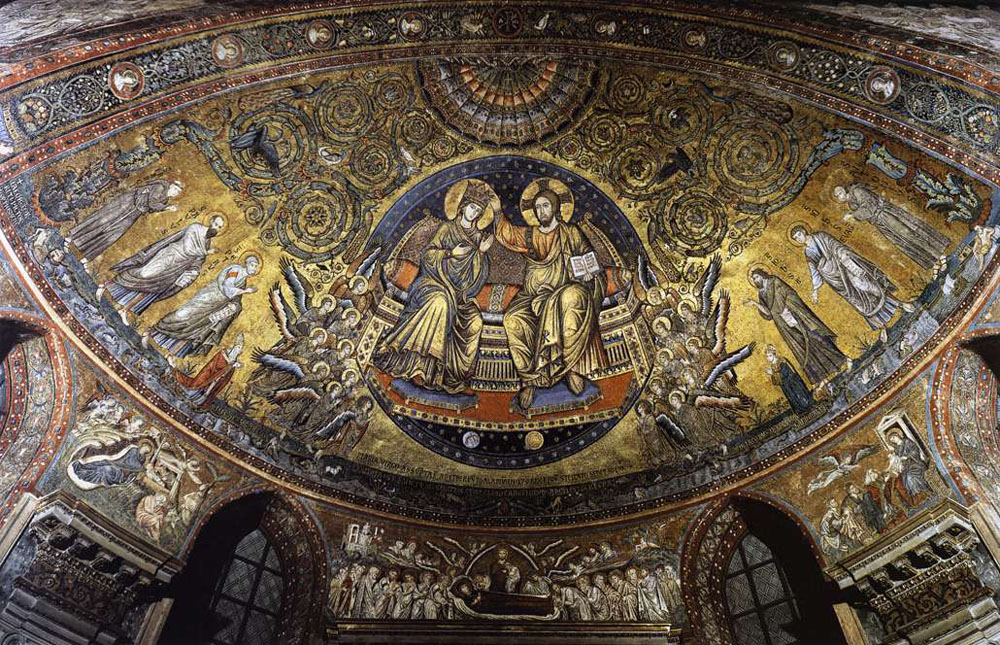
Coronation of the Virgin by Torritti.

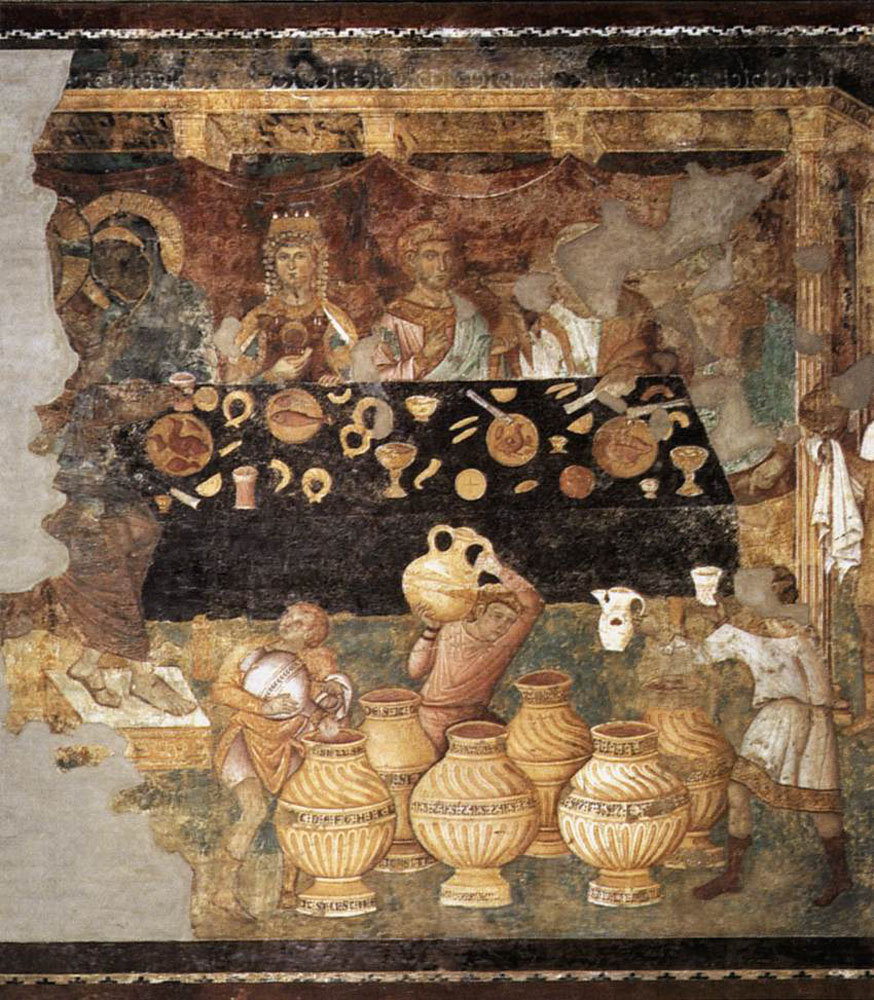
Marriage at Cana by Torritti.

Jacopo Torriti or Turriti was an Italian painter and mosaic maker who lived in the 13th century.

He worked in the decoration especially in the apse of San Giovanni in Laterano and Santa Maria Maggiore in Rome. Those in the Lateran were carried out in conjunction with the Franciscan friar, Jacopo Camerino. They were executed between the years 1287 and 1292, and though in imitation of the style of Cimabue.

There are no written documents about his life. In 1291, he signed the apse mosaics in the basilica San Giovanni in Laterano in Rome, which was nearly all redone in 1878. The mosaics of the apse in Santa Maria Maggiore were executed by him in 1295. They depict the Coronation of the Virgin by Christ in a large medallion. The medallion is encircled with a sprawling floral ornament with flowers, birds and animals, this probably original from the 4th century. In the lower strip of the mosaic we can see the standing figures of St Peter, St Paul and Pope Nicholas IV (left side), and St John the Baptist, St James the Great, St Antony and Giacomo Colonna (cardinal) (right side). The walls are decorated with scenes from the life of Mary. The apse of Santa Maria Maggiore is the most important surviving example of Roman mosaic art from the late Middle Ages.

Torriti probably participated in the execution of some frescoes in the upper church of Basilica of San Francesco d'Assisi and frescoes in Abbey of Tre Fontane close to Rome.

In France, a painting of Jacopo Torriti is exhibited at the Museum of Grenoble (Santa Lucia). He is credited with the mosaics for Pope Boniface VIII funerary monument in Rome. A mosaic fragment of the Head of the Madonna is housed at the Brooklyn Museum and that of the Christ Child is at the Pushkin Museum in Moscow.
