= Andrea da Bologna =

Italian painter

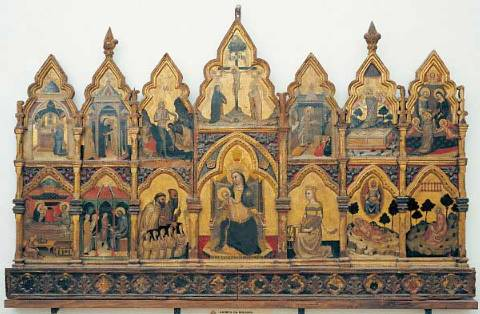
Virgin and Child with saints, Fermo

Andrea da Bologna was a follower of Vitale. A painting by him, representing 'The Virgin and Child,' signed De Bononia natus, Andreas fatus a.d. MCCCLXXII, is in the church Del Sacramento at Pansola, near Macerata. Another example of this painter is in a convent at Fermo, but Bologna does not possess any work by him. First documented in 1359 for an important commission as a book illuminator, Andrea must have, by that date, already been well advanced in his career; His patron was none less than the brother of Cardinal Egidio Albornoz (ca. 1310 - 1367), a leading figure in the political and cultural life of Bologna. This favour must have continued for, in 1368, the artist executed the decoration in the Chapel of Saint Catherine in the Lower Church at Assisi where the Cardinal was buried. It is on the basis of these still extant frescoes and those in the nearby Chapel of St. Lawrence, that modern criticism has been able to reconstruct the artistic profile of this painter. The corpus of the artist is mostly constructed of frescoes. Among the works on panel ascribed to Andrea is an altarpiece pinnacle with the figure of St. Mark, in a private collection in Ascoli Piceno.
