= Master of Saint Francis =

Italian painter

Detail of a Crucifix by the Master of Saint Francis (c.1275-80) Egg tempera on wood National Gallery, London

The Master of Saint Francis (in Italian Maestro di S. Francesco) was an anonymous Italian painter, perhaps of Pisan origin though probably trained in Umbria, working between 1250–1280. His work embodies an important aspect of the Italo-Byzantine style resulting from contact between Italian and Byzantine art of this period.

== Works ==
A painter of frescoes and panels and, perhaps, designer of stained glass in the district around Perugia, the Master of Saint Francis was given this name by art historian Henry Thode in 1885 and is based on the title of a panel painting, St. Francis with Angels, found in the Basilica of Saint Mary of the Angels in Assisi.

Much of the work attributed to him was part of the early phase in the decoration of Basilica of San Francesco of Assisi, including the fresco cycle in the nave of the Lower Church with five scenes from the Passion of Christ on the right wall and five scenes from the Life of St Francis on the left. (These were damaged by the later opening of the side chapels.) In spite of the obvious participation of assistants, the entire cycle seems to have been planned by a single artist and can be considered as homogeneous and characteristic of his style. The cycle was largely based on the later works of Giunta Pisano but also shows the influence of such Umbrian artists as Rainaldetto di Ranuccio, Simeone and Machilone and of contemporary manuscript illumination, for example the Gospel Book of Giovanni da Gaibena (Padua, Bib. Capitolare). Designs for some of the stained glass windows in the Upper Church are also attributed to him. In addition, he created a large panel painting (now divided into numerous pieces) for the church of Saint Francis al Prato in Perugia, and several painted crosses.

Within his works Byzantine elements, particularly of iconography, are found with western forms of ornamentation and a use of colour that is far from Byzantine.

== Gallery of selected works ==
=== Panel painting ===
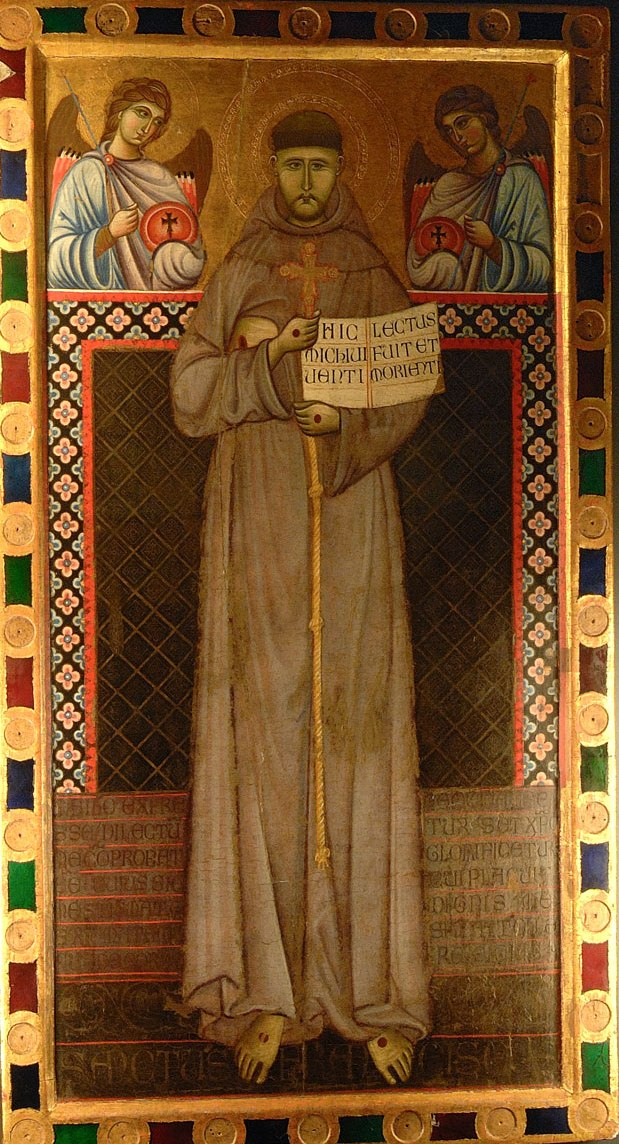
Saint Francis and Angels

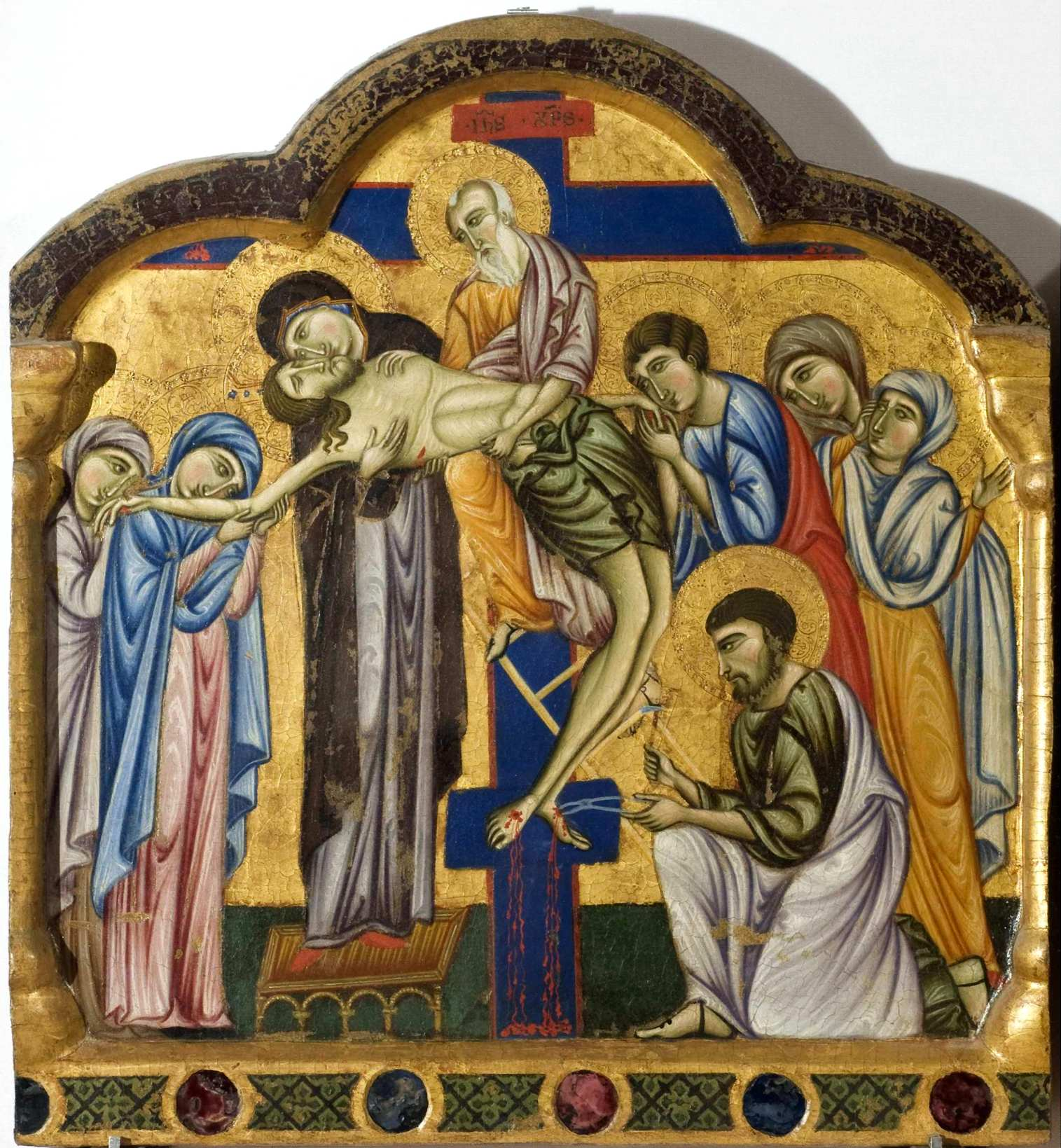
Deposition

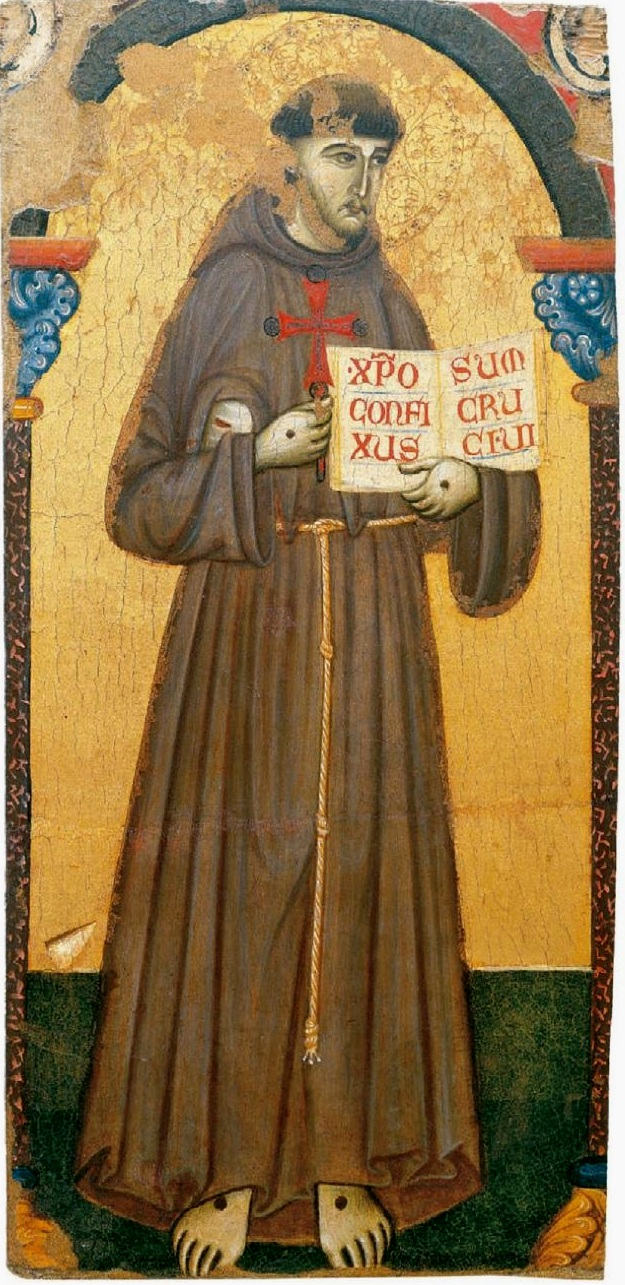
Saint Francis with the stigmata

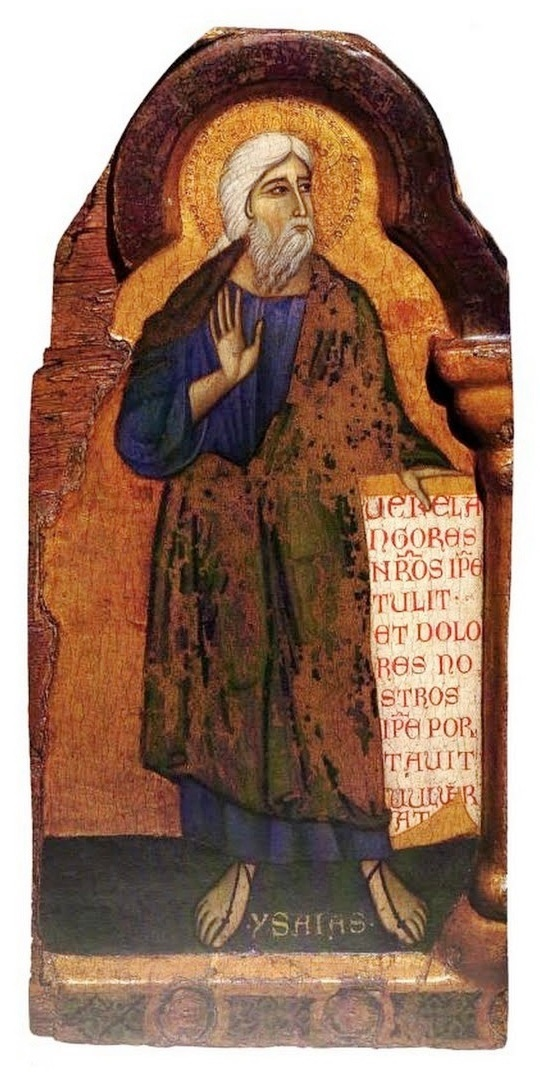
The prophet Isaiah

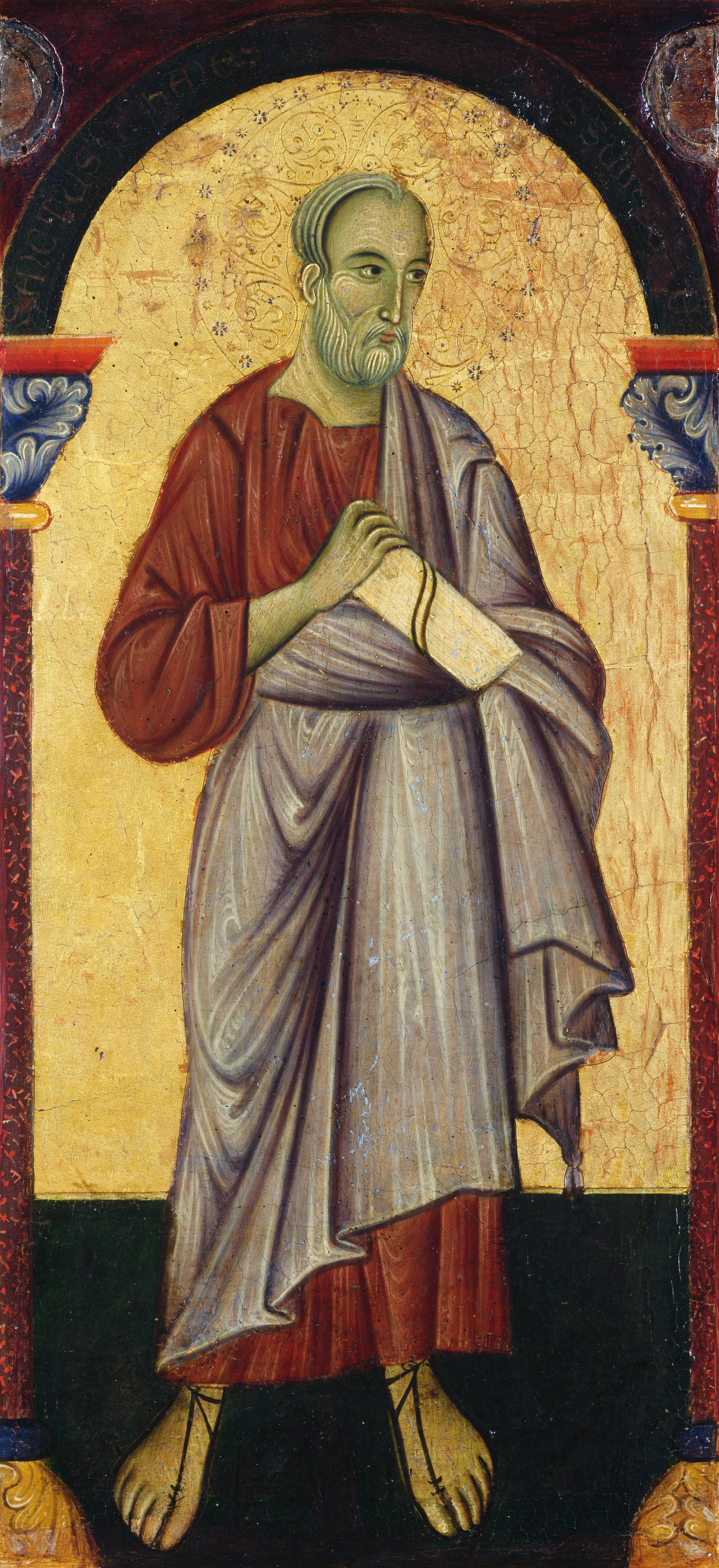
Saint John the Evangelist

=== Crucifixes ===
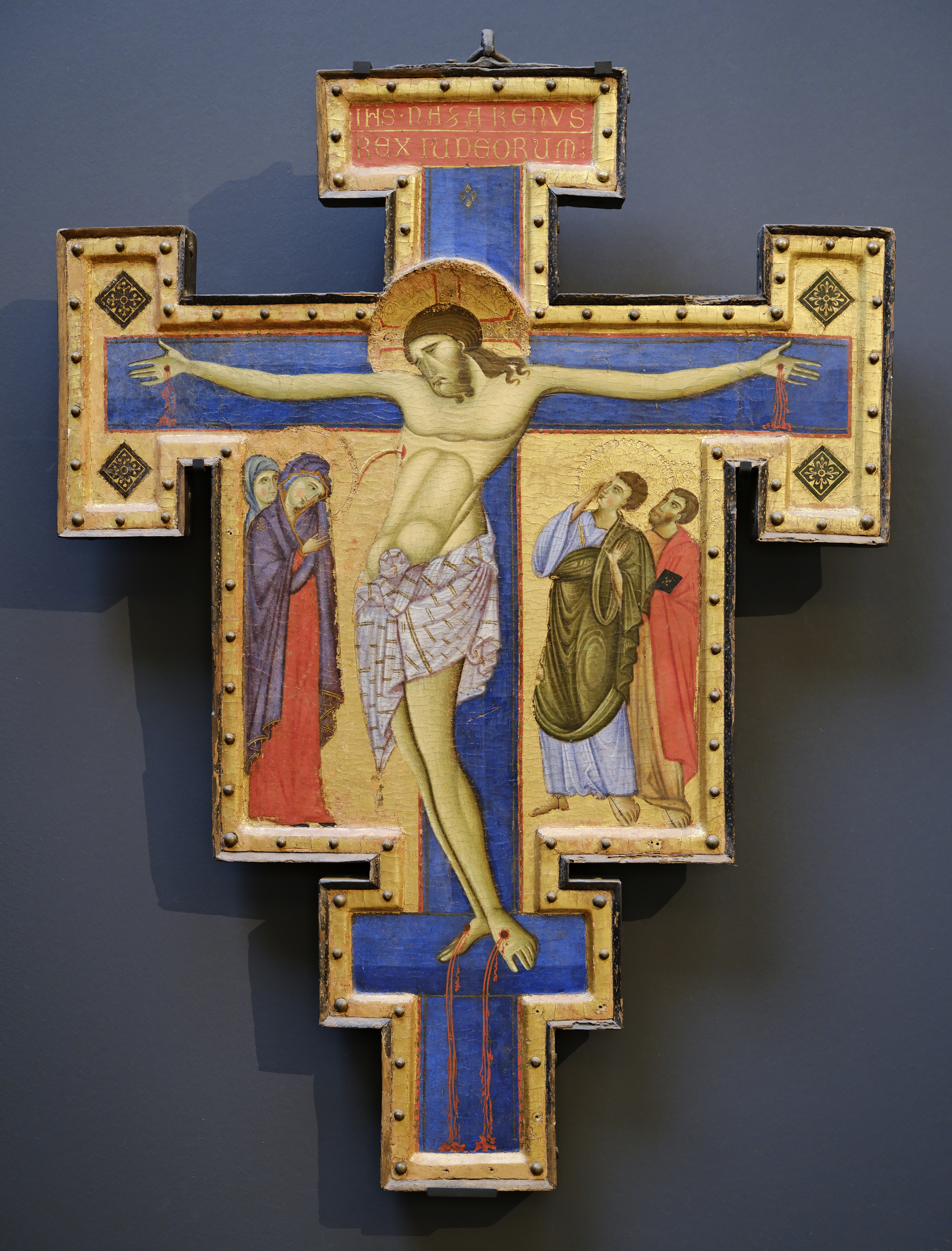
The Louvre Crucifix.

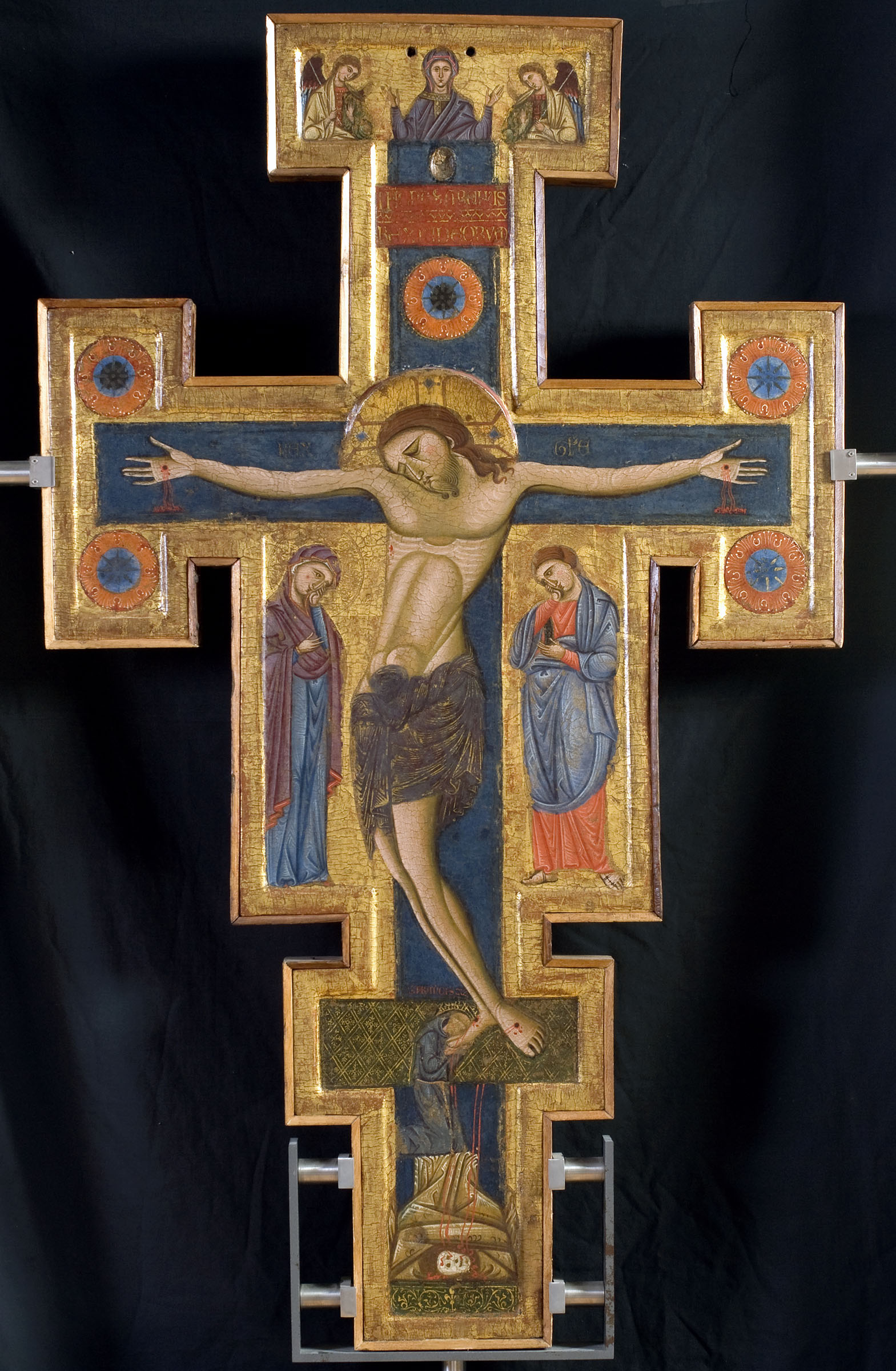

=== Stained glass ===
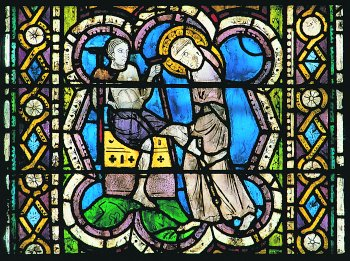

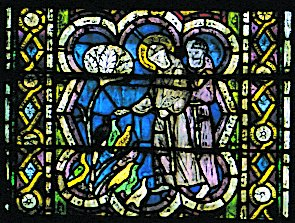

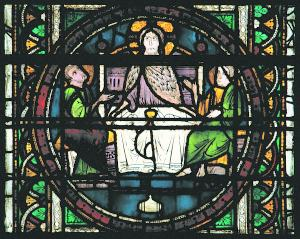

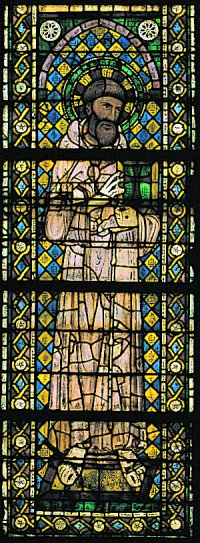

=== Frescoes ===
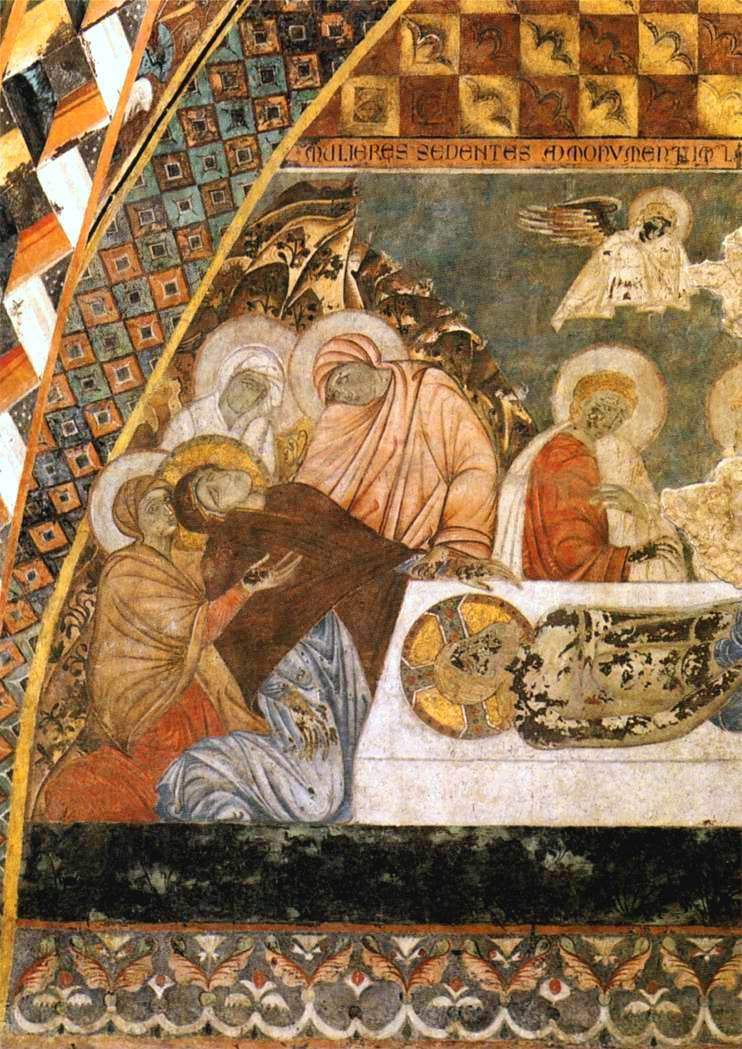

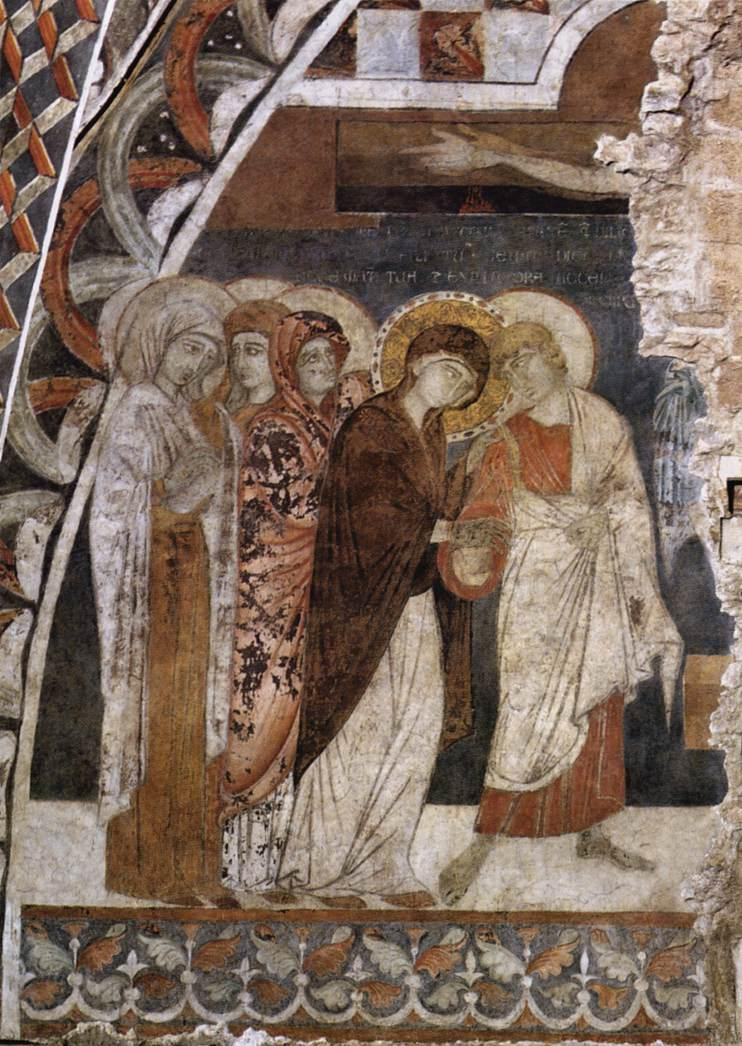

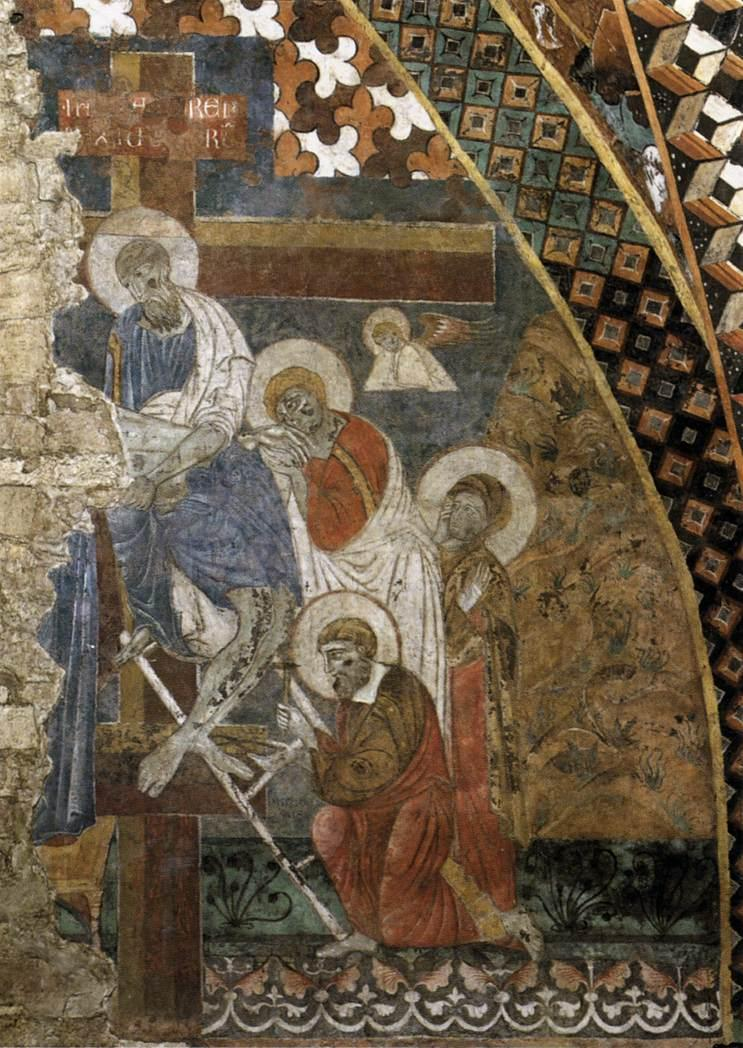

== See also ==
- Medieval art
- Umbria
- Assisi
