= List of municipalities of the Province of Terni =

The following is a list of the 33 municipalities (comuni) of the Province of Terni in the region of Umbria in Italy.

== List ==
Municipality	Population (2026)	Area (km²)	Density
Acquasparta	4,330	81.61	53.1
Allerona	1,679	82.61	20.3
Alviano	1,318	23.90	55.1
Amelia	11,404	132.50	86.1
Arrone	2,504	41.04	61.0
Attigliano	1,962	10.51	186.7
Avigliano Umbro	2,308	51.34	45.0
Baschi	2,544	68.57	37.1
Calvi dell'Umbria	1,660	45.79	36.3
Castel Giorgio	1,992	42.14	47.3
Castel Viscardo	2,640	26.22	100.7
Fabro	2,570	34.55	74.4
Ferentillo	1,767	69.59	25.4
Ficulle	1,548	64.62	24.0
Giove	1,829	15.09	121.2
Guardea	1,714	39.38	43.5
Lugnano in Teverina	1,390	29.83	46.6
Montecastrilli	4,787	62.43	76.7
Montecchio	1,427	49.22	29.0
Montefranco	1,243	10.09	123.2
Montegabbione	1,095	51.06	21.4
Monteleone d'Orvieto	1,357	24.10	56.3
Narni	17,626	197.99	89.0
Orvieto	19,052	281.27	67.7
Otricoli	1,717	27.53	62.4
Parrano	492	40.09	12.3
Penna in Teverina	1,024	10.00	102.4
Polino	233	19.57	11.9
Porano	1,816	13.60	133.5
San Gemini	4,611	27.90	165.3
San Venanzo	2,122	169.45	12.5
Stroncone	4,606	71.17	64.7
Terni	106,272	212.43	500.3

== Gallery ==
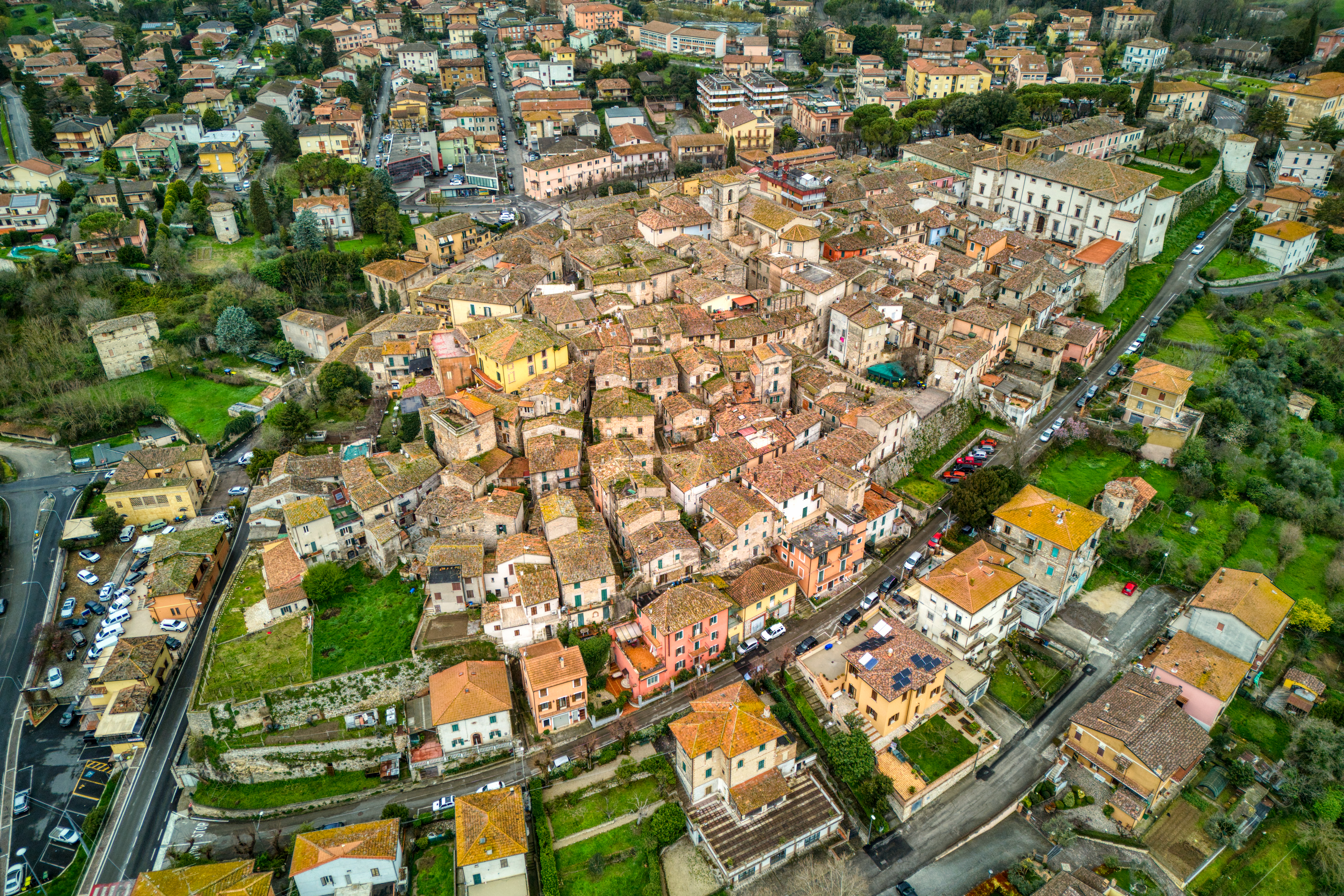
Acquasparta

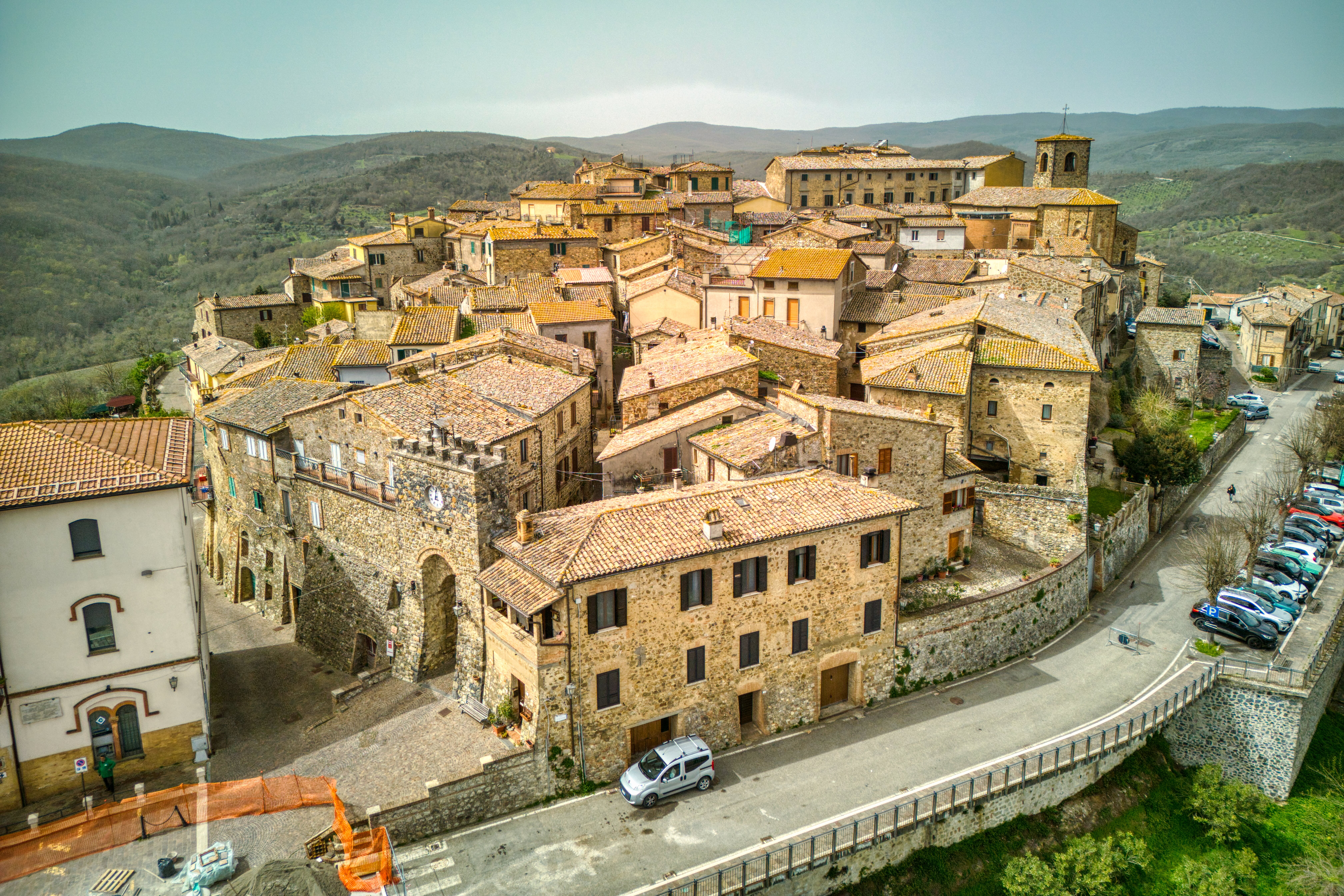
Allerona

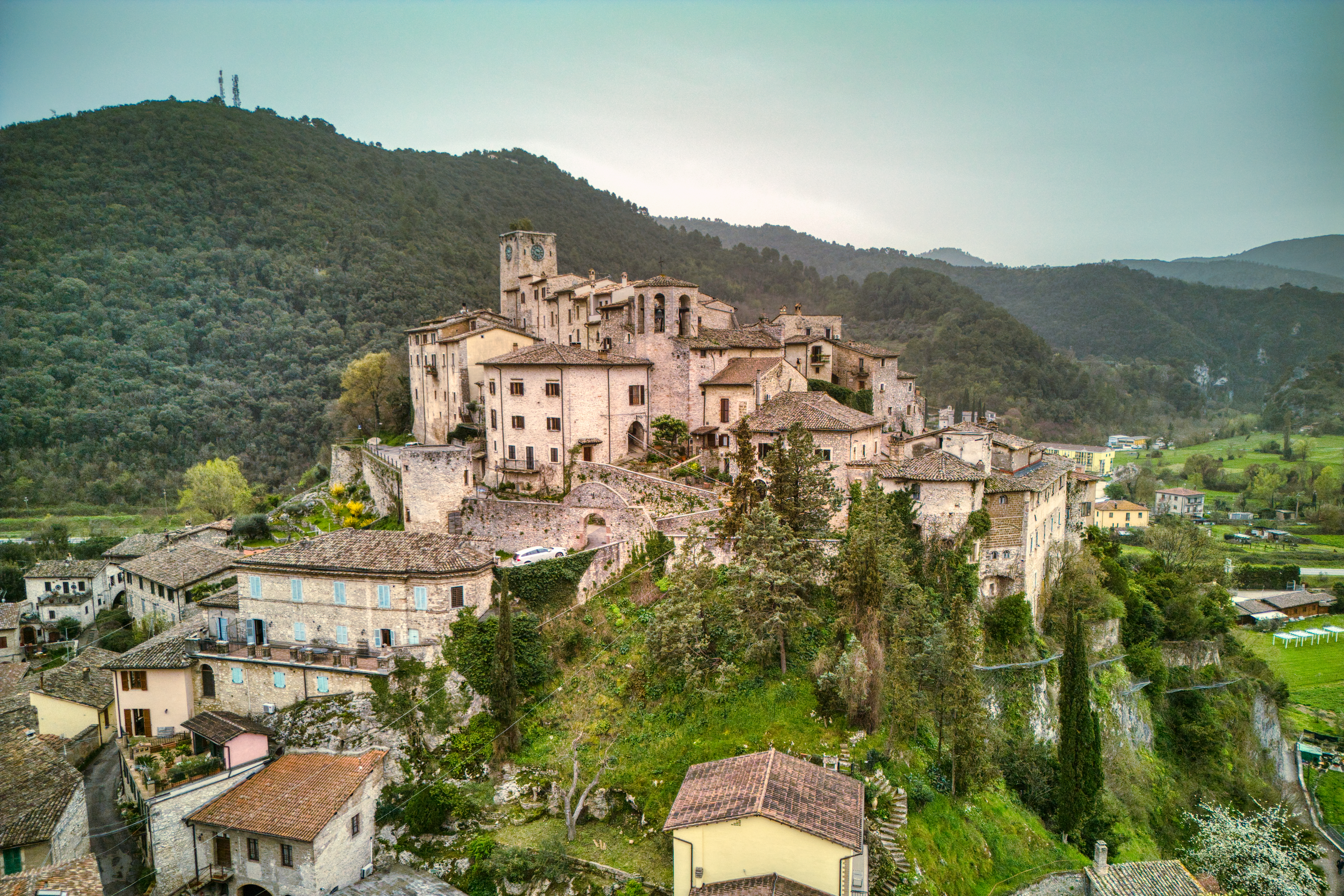
Arrone

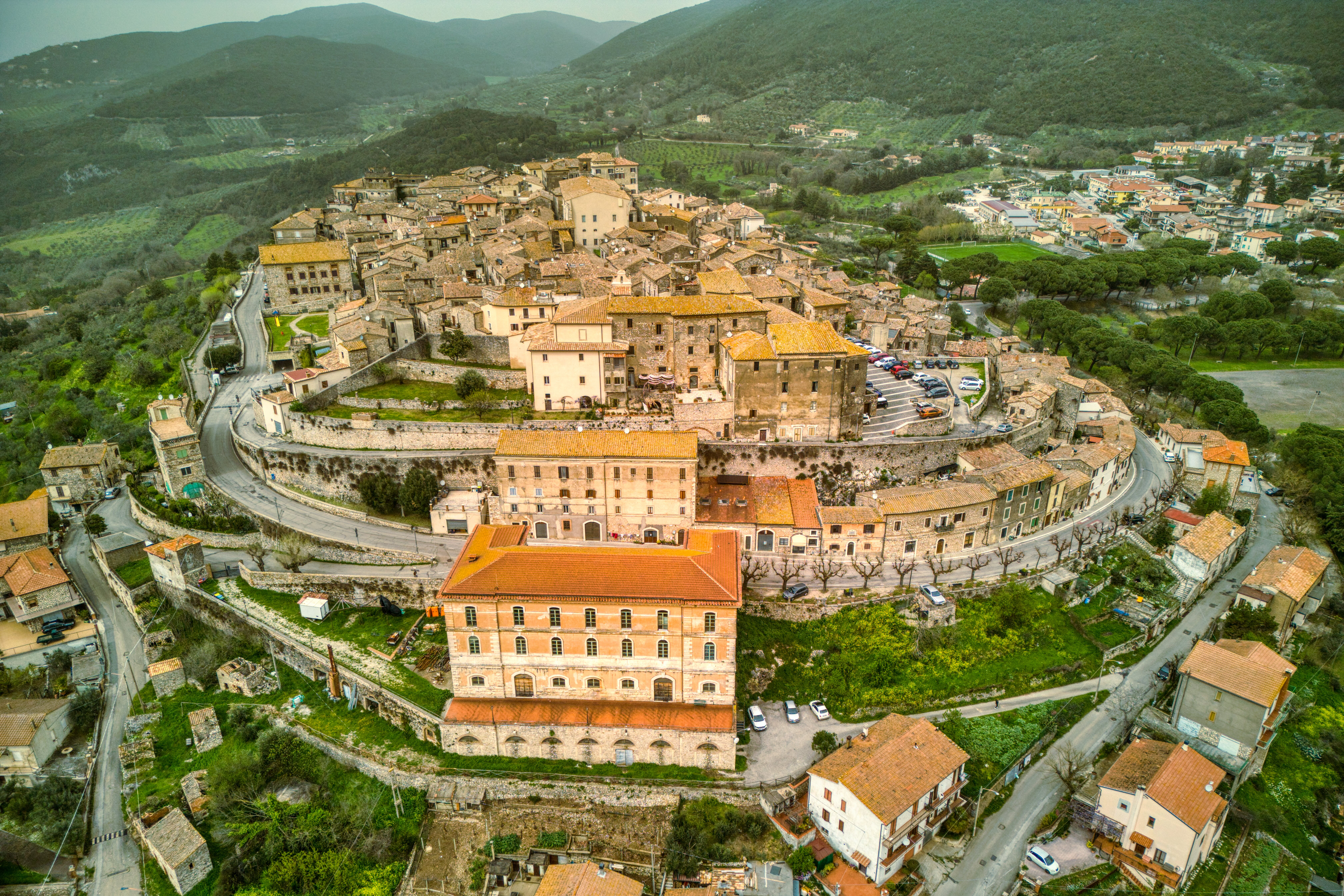
Lugnano in Teverina

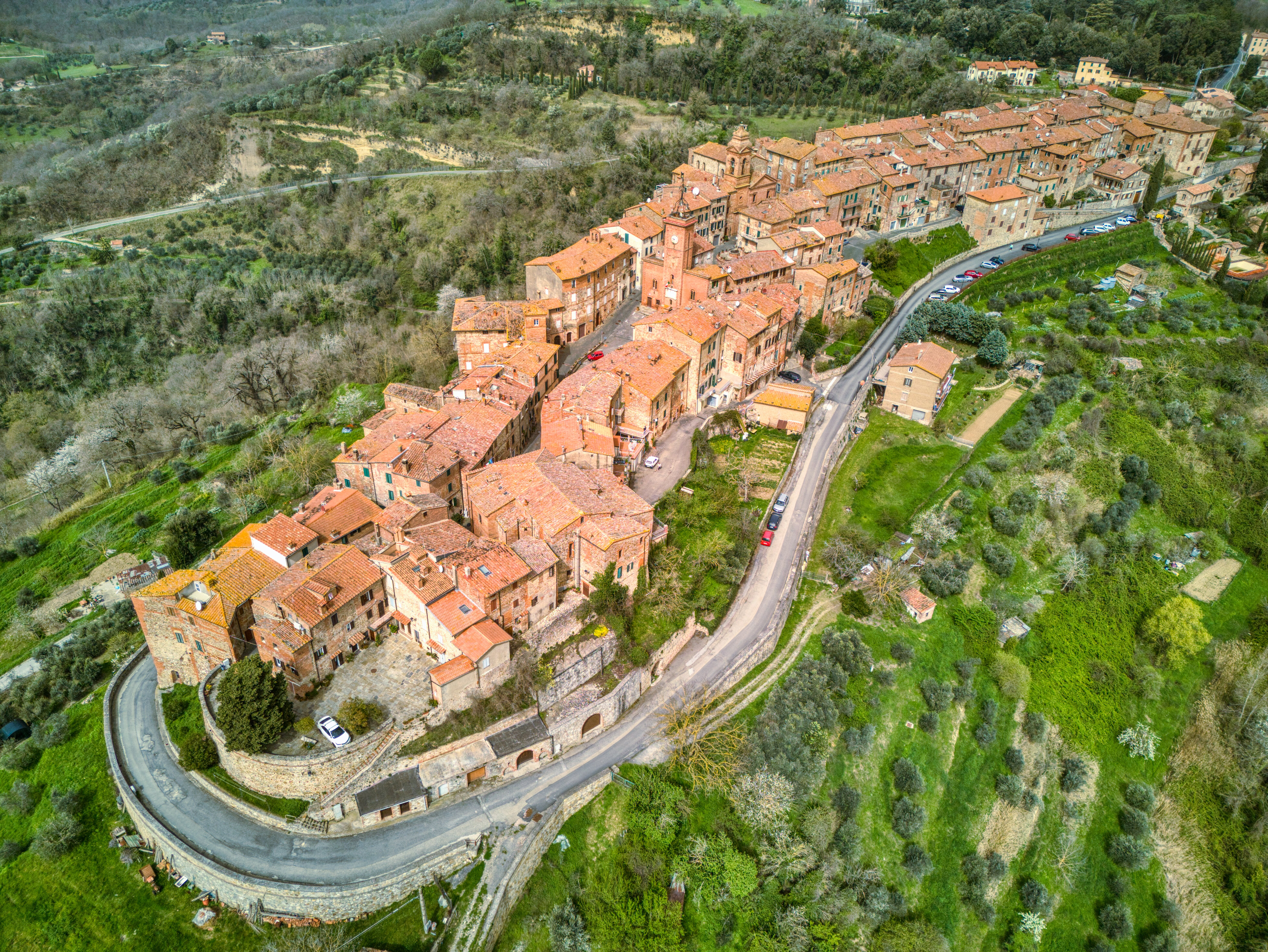
Monteleone d'Orvieto

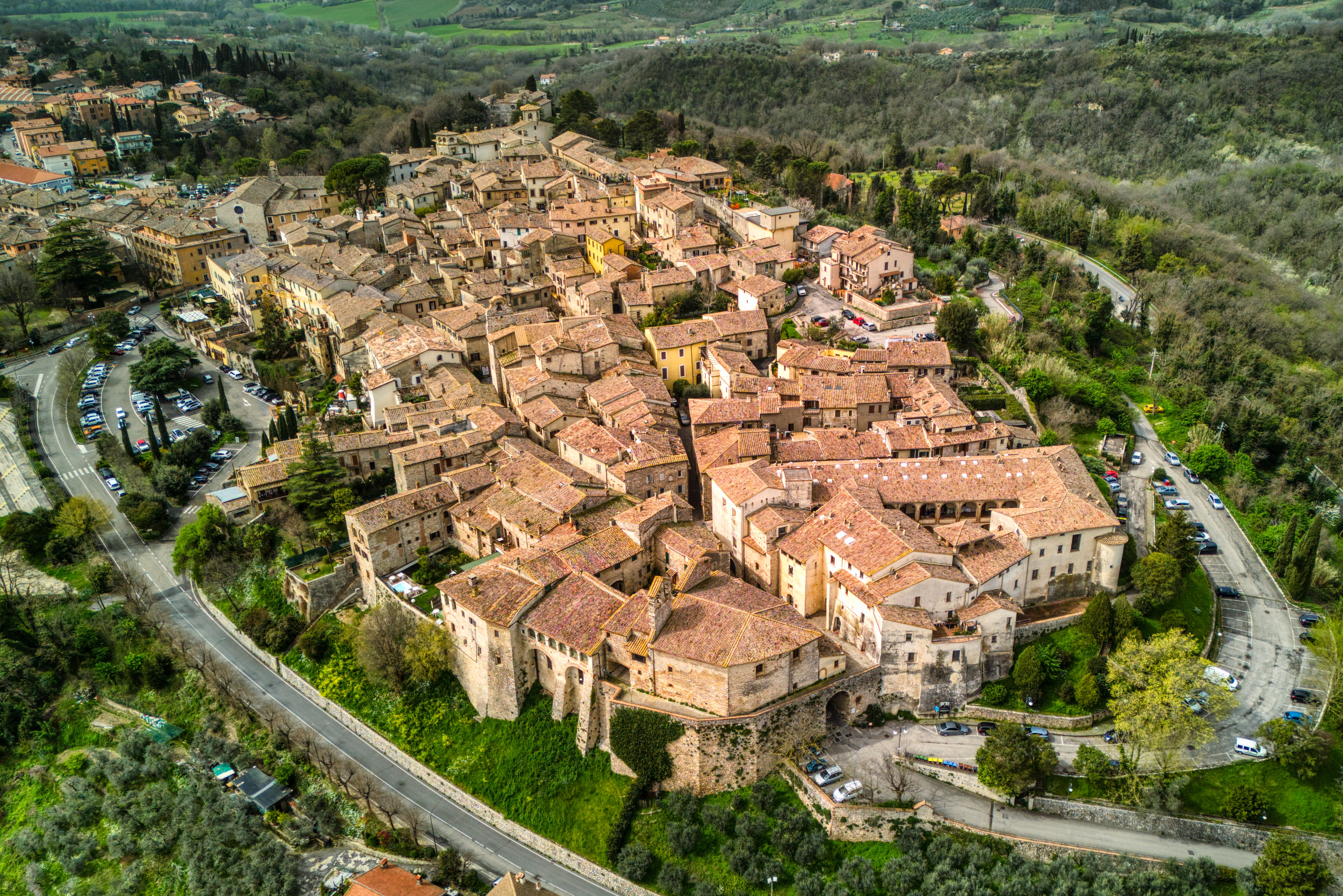
San Gemini

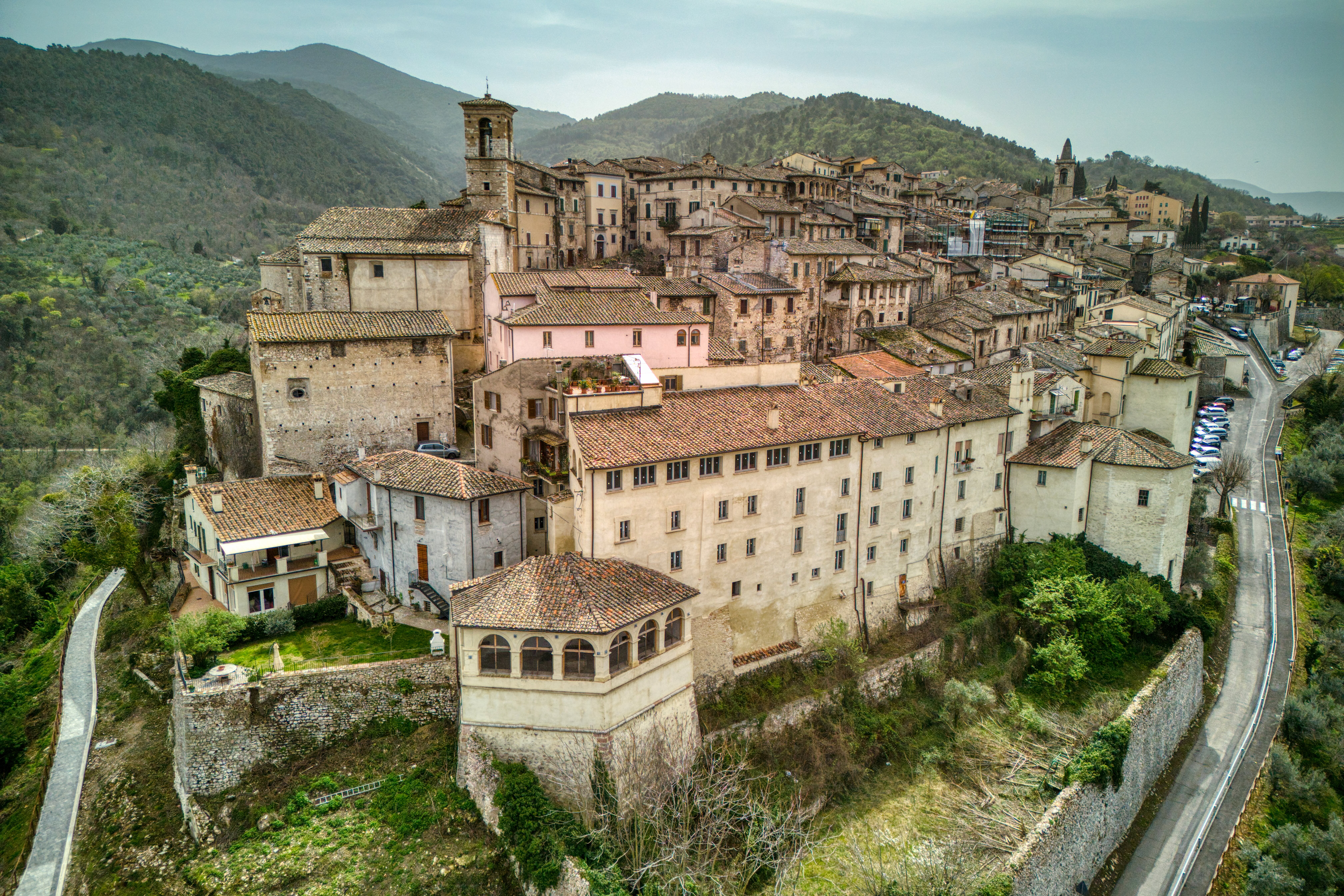
Stroncone

== See also ==
- List of municipalities of Umbria
- List of municipalities of Italy
