= Fabro =

- Comune
- Comune di Fabro
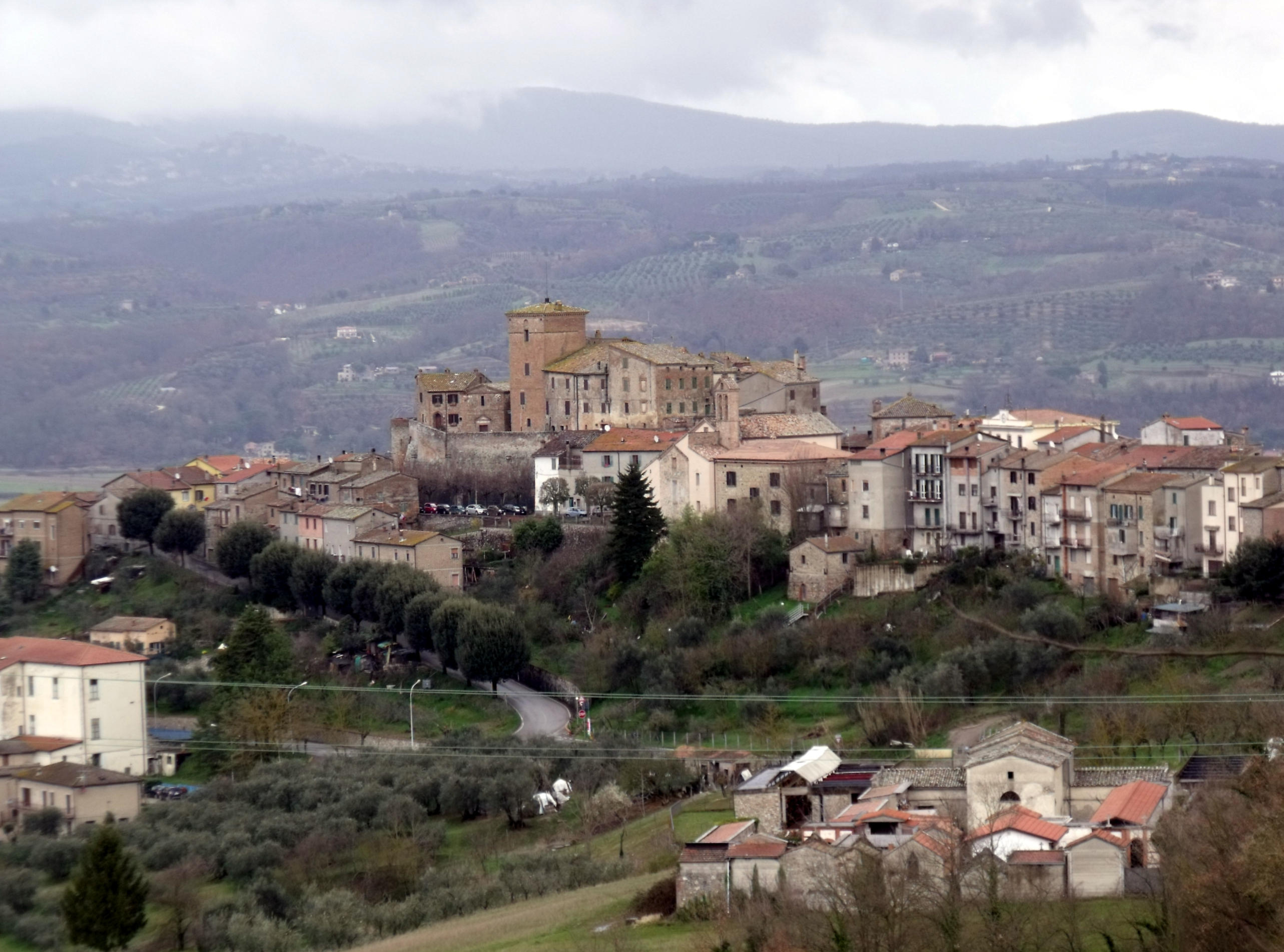
- View of Fabro

- Coat of arms

- Location within Italy Location within Umbria
- Coordinates: 42.863352°N 12.012974°E
- Country: Italy
- Region: Umbria
- Province: Terni (TR)

Government
  - Mayor: Simone Barbanera

Area
  - Total: 34.55 km^{2} (13.34 sq mi)
- Elevation: 364 m (1,194 ft)

Population (1 January 2025)
  - Total: 2,579
  - Density: 74.65/km^{2} (193.3/sq mi)
- Demonym: Fabresi
- Time zone: UTC+1 (CET)
  - Summer (DST): UTC+2 (CEST)
- Postal code: 05015
- Dialing code: 0763
- Patron saint: Saint Martin
- Saint day: November 11
- Website: Official website

Fabro is a comune (municipality) in the Province of Terni in the Italian region Umbria, located about 40 km southwest of Perugia and about 60 km northwest of Terni.

== History ==
Fabro is first mentioned in 1118 under the name Castrum Fabri in the Codice diplomatico of Orvieto.

From 1272 it belonged to the Filippeschi family, who held it for approximately four centuries. In the 14th century it served as the capital of the Mandamento of Ficulle under the lordship of Boccante Monaldeschi della Vipera, tyrant of Orvieto.

In 1495 Fabro came under the jurisdiction of the municipality of Orvieto. On 25 May 1548 a statute was drafted during the feudatory rule of Filippo Pepoli of Bologna, who was also lord of Città della Pieve.

In the early 17th century the castle of Fabro was purchased by Orazio di Marsciano, who initiated restoration works. During this century the locality became a municipality with its own statutes. In 1701, Fabro was a feudal domain of the Marquess Lancia. By 1803, it had passed to the Marquess Antinori, a status which it retained in 1817.

In the mid-19th century Fabro had a population of 1,025 inhabitants. Of these, 364 resided within the town and 661 in the surrounding countryside.

Around 1870 the municipalities of Fabro and Carnaiola were united.

In the 1930s Fabro Scalo developed around the railway station. It subsequently became the most populous frazione of the municipality and is characterized by commercial, artisanal, and service activities.

In 1944 the town suffered severe damage during the German retreat.

During the 20th century the area of Colonnetta developed near the motorway tollgate, forming a large artisanal-industrial zone.

== Geography ==
Fabro stands on a hill at an elevation of 364 metres (1,194 ft) above sea level, on the right bank of the river Chiani, about 24 kilometres (15 mi) from Orvieto.

Fabro is situated a short distance from the Tuscan border. It lies 2 miles (3.2 km) from Salci and 4 miles (6.4 km) from Ficulle. Two nearby streams are recorded under the names Argento and Formella.

Fabro borders the following municipalities: Allerona, Cetona, Città della Pieve, Ficulle, Montegabbione, Monteleone d'Orvieto, San Casciano dei Bagni.

=== Subdivisions ===
The municipality includes the localities of Fabro, Fabro Scalo, Podere Begnami, Poggio della Fame.

In 2021, 249 people lived in rural dispersed dwellings not assigned to any named locality. At the time, most of the population lived in Fabro Scalo (1,447), and Fabro proper (906).

The municipality also includes Poggiovalle, an administrative enclave situated within the territory of Città della Pieve.

== Religion and culture ==
=== San Martino ===
The parish church of Fabro is the church of San Martino, who is venerated as the town's patron saint. The feast of San Martino takes place on 11 November and is marked by a public celebration.

The church was built in the 19th century, and stands in a central and elevated position within Fabro. The façade, in brick, is simple in design and framed by two lateral pilasters. The interior has a Latin cross plan with a single nave and a semicircular apse. Among the furnishings is a wooden bas-relief dated 1930, carved in Val Gardena and depicting Saint Martin.

=== Other religious buildings ===
Other religious buildings in the area include the Church of San Severo e Salvatore in Carnaiola.

=== Castle of Fabro ===
The castle of Fabro is situated on a panoramic hill at an elevation of 364 metres (1,194 ft), east of the Chiani river. Of fortified origin and characterized by an almond-shaped plan, it was founded around the 11th century and restored in the 16th century. The 16th-century intervention is attributed to Antonio da Sangallo the Younger.

The complex, now privately owned, retains much of its structure, including a compact defensive wall circuit and a large cylindrical tower. It belonged to the Filippeschi family from its foundation until 1313, then passed to the Monaldeschi and, in 1488, to Cesario Bandini of Città della Pieve. His heirs were forced to abandon it in 1494 following conflicts with Orvieto. It later became an important stronghold of the Papal State.

=== Castle of Carnaiola ===
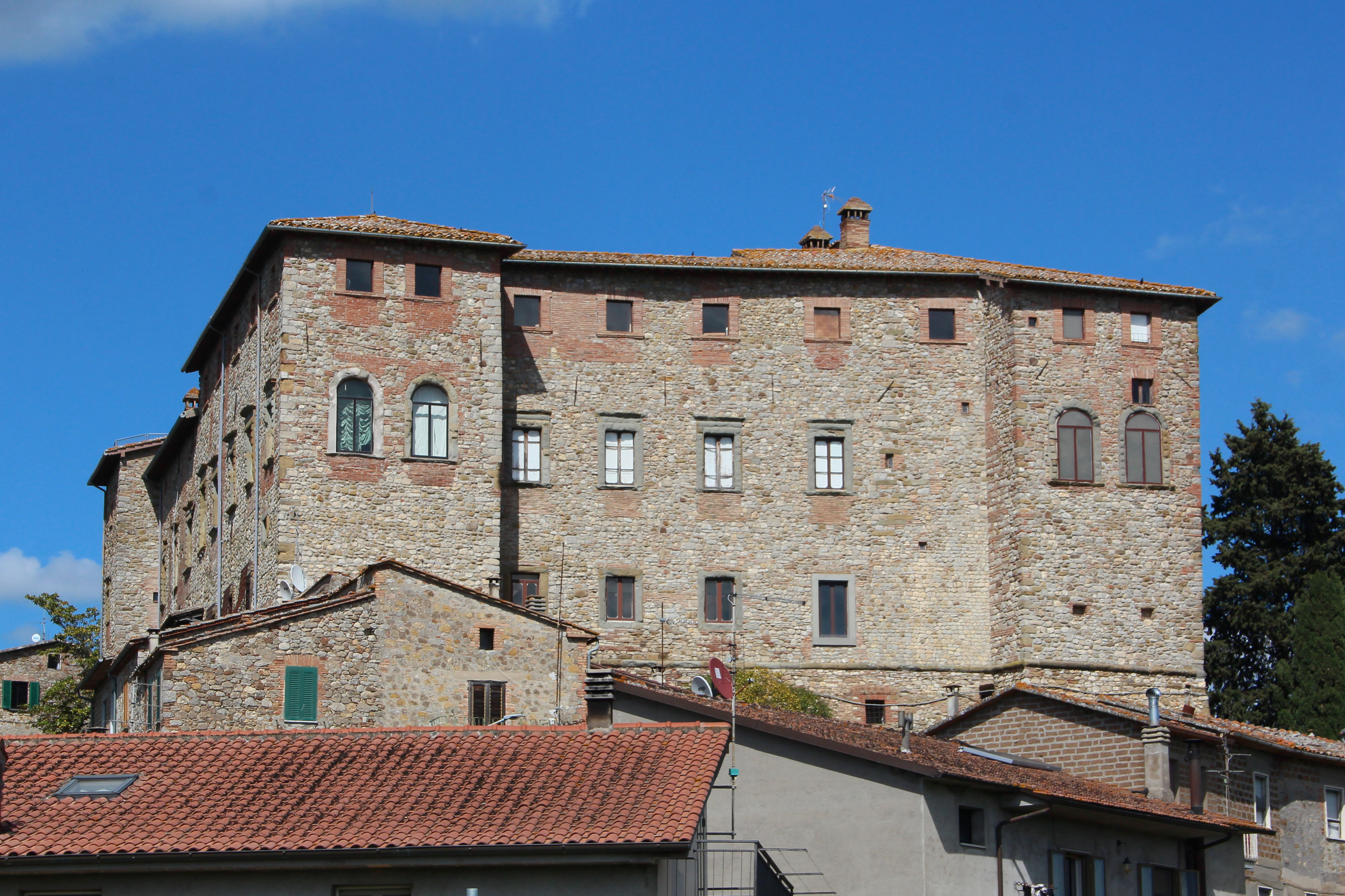
The castle of Carnaiola

The castle of Carnaiola was built around the 11th century by the people of Orvieto to control a ford of the Chiani, at a site where in Roman times a structure known as the muro grosso had been constructed as a passable embankment. It was transformed into a fortified castle with corner bastions in the 16th century and contains frescoes dating from the 16th and 17th centuries. Initially held by the Filippeschi and later by the counts of Marsciano, it gave rise to the settlement of Carnaiola.

== Notable families ==
Among the principal families recorded in the 19th century were the Costarelli and the Canini.
