= Piegaro =

- Comune
- Comune di Piegaro
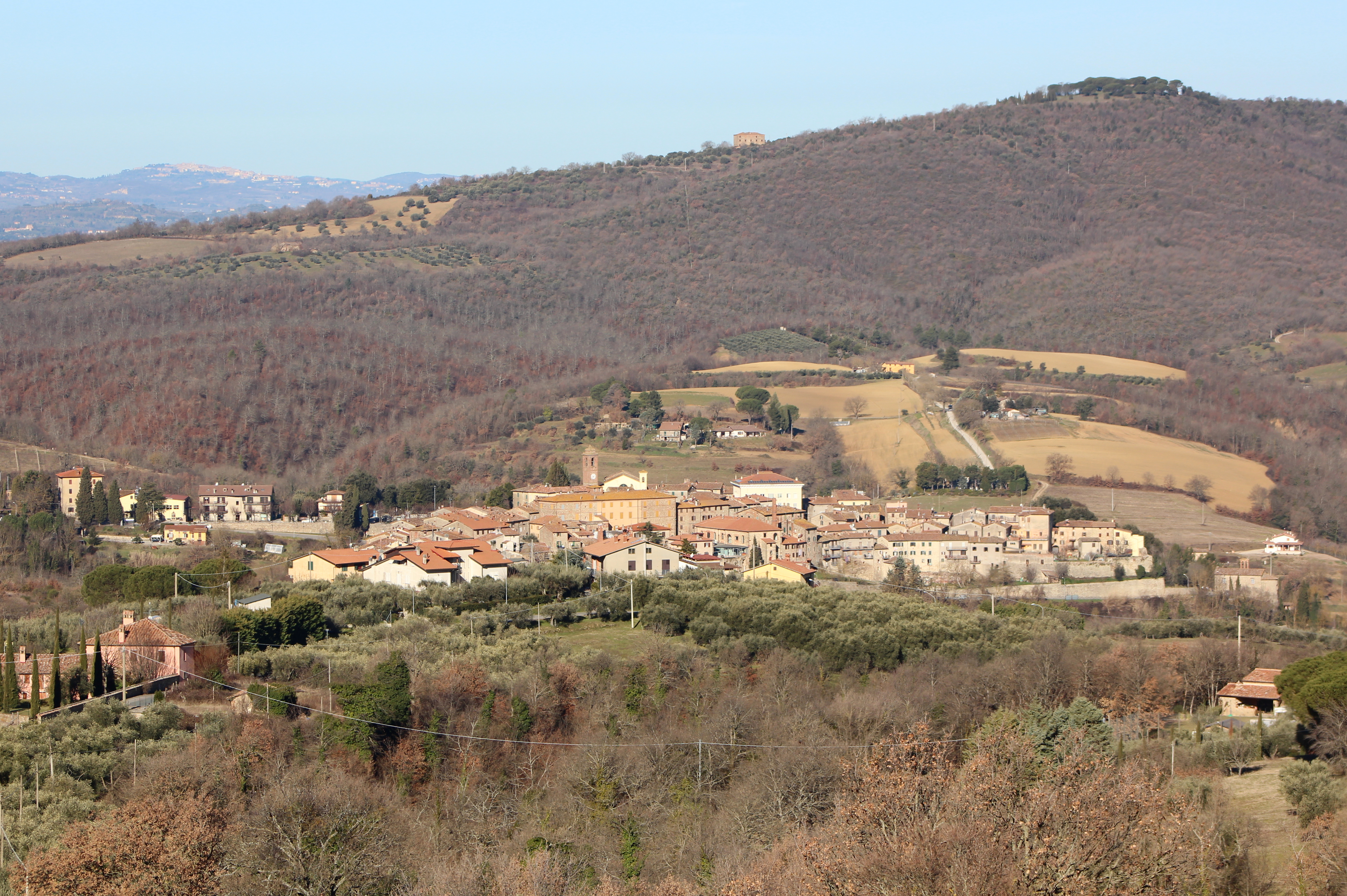
- View of Piegaro

- Coat of arms

- Location within Italy Location within Umbria
- Coordinates: 42.970565°N 12.086041°E
- Country: Italy
- Region: Umbria
- Province: Perugia (PG)

Government
  - Mayor: Andrea Caporali

Area
  - Total: 99.0 km^{2} (38.2 sq mi)
- Elevation: 356 m (1,168 ft)

Population (1 January 2025)
  - Total: 3,347
  - Density: 33.8/km^{2} (87.6/sq mi)
- Demonym: Piegaresi
- Time zone: UTC+1 (CET)
  - Summer (DST): UTC+2 (CEST)
- Postal code: 06066
- Dialing code: 075
- Website: Official website

Piegaro is a comune (municipality) in the Province of Perugia in the Italian region Umbria, located about 30 km southwest of Perugia.

== History ==
Tradition associates the origin of the settlement with a Roman foundation in 290 BC. In medieval records it appears under the name Plagarium. Because it stood in a border area, authority shifted over time between Orvieto and Perugia.

Until 1601 the community belonged to the diocese of Chiusi, after which it became part of the newly created diocese of Città della Pieve. Families from Città della Pieve exercised control there since the 13th century.

In 1240 Frederick II reassigned the castle from the counts of Chiusi to the counts of Marsciano. Power later moved to the Montemarte of Montegabbione and then to the Filippeschi. In 1296 an agreement with Perugia brought the town under Perugian jurisdiction. Perugia granted municipal statutes, a civic coat of arms, and established boundaries with Castel della Pieve. A manuscript copy of the statutes dated 1518 is known.

In 1373 Piegaro was granted by Emperor Charles IV to Guillaume de Beaufort, brother of Pope Gregory XI.

During the 14th century the population endured both food shortages and repeated military incursions. Forces from Siena entered the area, followed later by Breton troops and members of the Baglioni family. After the walls were dismantled on the orders of Pellino di Cucco Baglioni, the inhabitants later took part in actions in Perugia alongside Biordo, targeting the Baglioni. When the Raspanti gained power in Perugia in 1394, the town's fortifications were rebuilt and certain customs duties were suspended. It was then included among the castles of the contado of Porta Eburnea. The fortress served Perugia in its wars against Siena.

Braccio Fortebraccio's arrival at the beginning of the 15th century coincided with renewed activity in the glass industry, which had existed since the 13th century. In 1443 Ciarpellone, a captain of Niccolò Piccinino, devastated and destroyed the town. The inhabitants were subsequently assisted by the Perugians in rebuilding the castle and walls, with additional support from Pope Eugene IV.

In the 16th century Pope Julius II and Pope Paul III introduced four years of tax exemptions to support glass production. Duke Ascanio della Corgna and the Opera del Duomo of Orvieto commissioned additional works from the town's workshops. Production continued to expand in the 17th century, particularly in household goods. Glassmaking remained central to the local economy thereafter, though with varying results over time.

In the 1890s, Piegaro had a population of 4,439 inhabitants.

== Geography ==
Piegaro stands at an elevation of about 356 metres (1,168 ft) above sea level on a hill whose slopes descend toward the Nestore River, a tributary of the Tiber. The historic centre is still enclosed by medieval walls, with a small suburb adjoining them. The town lies approximately 10 kilometres (6.2 mi) from Città della Pieve.

Piegaro borders the following municipalities: Città della Pieve, Marsciano, Montegabbione, Monteleone d'Orvieto, Paciano, Panicale, Perugia, San Venanzo.

Castiglion Fosco, one of the localities within the municipality, lies halfway up a mountain and is described as compact in layout.

=== Subdivisions ===
The municipality includes the localities of Abbadia Settefrati, Acquaiola-Gratiano, Borghetto, Casaceccame, Castiglion Fosco, Collebaldo, Collicello, Ginestreto, La Fontana, Macereto Alto, Nociarelle-Scarpiello, Oro, Palombaro del Cieco, Piegaro, Pietrafitta, Polino, Ponibbiale, Pratalenza, Vignaie, Vincenze.

In 2021, 816 people lived in rural dispersed dwellings not assigned to any named locality. At the time, the most populous localities were Pietrafitta (705), Piegaro proper (663).

== Economy ==
Glassmaking developed significantly in Piegaro and became its principal industry. Agriculture has traditionally complemented this activity, with the cultivation of cereals and vines and the exploitation of woodland resources. The reported presence of lignite in the late 19th century suggests that mineral resources were also known, though their extent and exploitation are not specified.

== Religion and culture ==
=== Madonna della Crocetta ===
The small church of the Madonna della Crocetta was presumably founded in the second half of the 16th century as the seat of the Confraternity of the Crocetta, whose emblem, a small Greek cross, recurs inside the building as a decorative motif. In 1851 the church underwent a major restoration that did not alter its original appearance.

Externally the building is simple, with the main decorative elements being a bell-gable and a central rose window on the façade. The interior consists of a single nave roofed by a barrel vault interrupted by lateral lunettes. Notable features include ceiling frescoes of the 16th–17th centuries depicting the Assumption of the Virgin, which are reported to be in poor condition today.

=== Other religious heritage ===
San Silvestro serves as the principal parish church. In Castiglion Fosco, the parish church of Santa Croce houses an 18-stop organ built by the Morettini family and a wooden statue of the Holy Crucifix, described in the 19th century as notable and venerated.

=== Museo del Vetro ===
The Glass Museum of Piegaro is set up inside the former glass factory dating to the early 19th century, restored with the aim of faithfully reconstructing the historic factory. The restoration preserved and highlighted features including the chimney, the melting furnace with solidified glass from the last firing, tunnels used for heat recovery, and systems for ventilation and cooling. The museum is presented as one of the few preserved examples in Italy of pre-industrial structures for glassworking.

On display are glass objects produced there over the centuries, ranging from hand-finished glasses, bottles and carafes, including examples with decorations in fine gold, to demijohns and straw-wrapped flasks that became characteristic products of the factory. The visitor route, arranged through a sequence of spaces on two levels, follows the historic production cycle from the arrival of raw materials to the finished product, passing through melting and stages of working, first manual (by glass-blowing) and later semi-automatic.

=== Museo Paleontologico (Pietrafitta) ===
The Paleontological Museum of Pietrafitta houses fossil remains found in the basin surrounding the upper valley of the river Nestore. The collection of fossils from the Quaternary lignites of Pietrafitta now comprises several thousand specimens.
