= Ficulle =

- Comune
- Comune di Ficulle
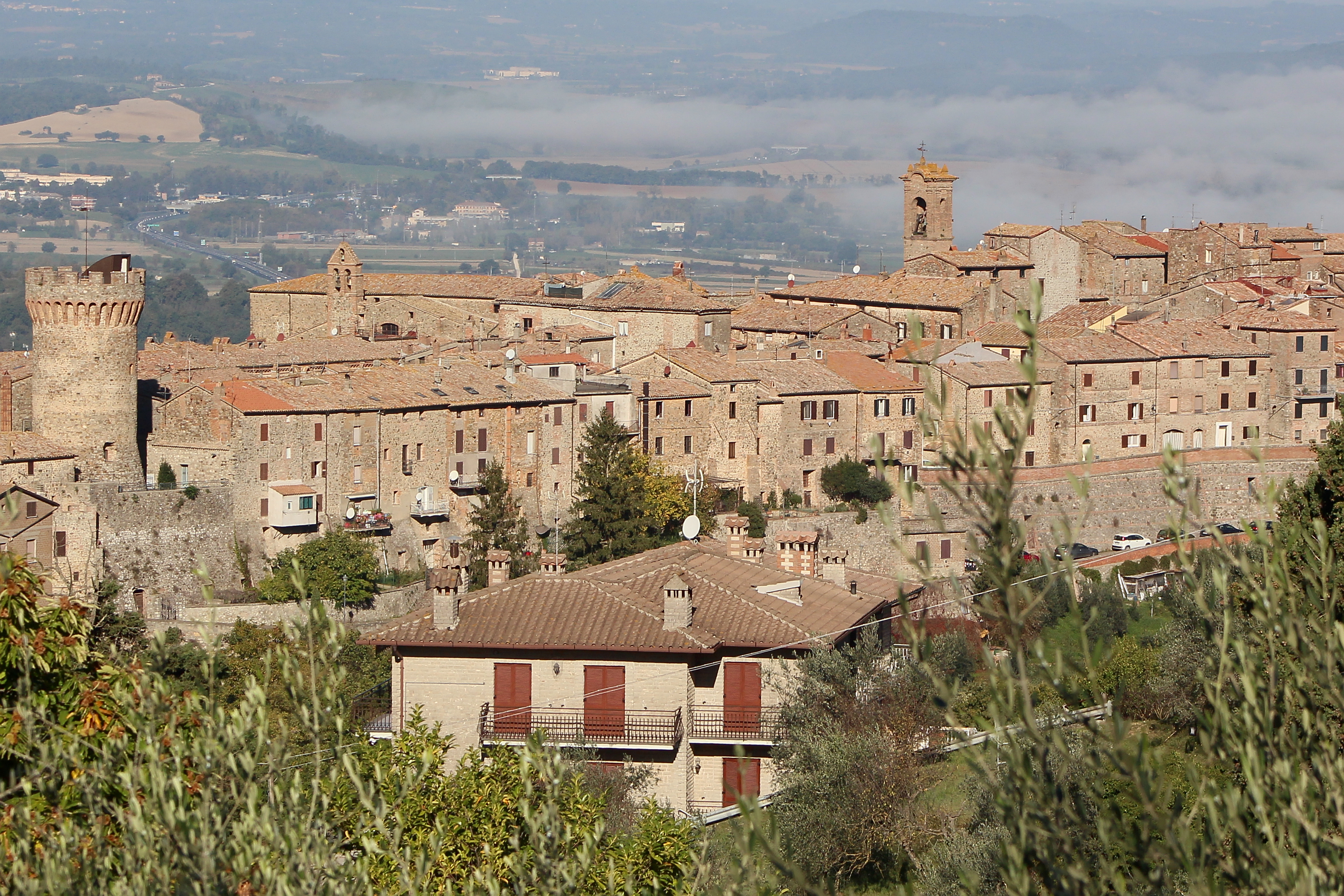
- View of Ficulle

- Location within Italy Location within Umbria
- Coordinates: 42.836078°N 12.066224°E
- Country: Italy
- Region: Umbria
- Province: Terni (TR)

Government
  - Mayor: Gianluigi Maravalle

Area
  - Total: 64.62 km^{2} (24.95 sq mi)
- Elevation: 437 m (1,434 ft)

Population (1 January 2025)
  - Total: 1,562
  - Density: 24.17/km^{2} (62.61/sq mi)
- Demonym: Ficullesi
- Time zone: UTC+1 (CET)
  - Summer (DST): UTC+2 (CEST)
- Postal code: 05016
- Dialing code: 0763
- Website: Official website

Ficulle is a comune (municipality) in the Province of Terni in the Italian region Umbria, located about 40 km southwest of Perugia and about 60 km northwest of Terni.

== Etymology ==
The origin of the name Ficulle is uncertain. According to one tradition reported by Adone Palmieri, it derives from a colony of Ficulea, said to have been founded by the Aborigines near Nomentum, from which the settlement took its name.

Another traditional interpretation connects the name to figulus (potter), in reference to the local production of fine earthenware. The municipal coat of arms features a fig tree laden with fruit.

== History ==
According to tradition, Ficulle originated from a colony of Ficulea, an ancient city near Nomentum (modern Mentana) in Sabina. A Latin inscription discovered beyond the river Paglia, later moved to a church outside the town, refers to a cave, an altar, and small statues dedicated by a certain Tiberius Claudius Thermodonte to Sol Invictus Mithra.

A bridge known as the Ponte del muro grosso was attributed to the time of Nero. Archaeological excavations carried out in 1854 uncovered numerous Etruscan vases and the large skeleton of an animal, identified at the time as a prehistoric mastodon.

In the Middle Ages, a Benedictine abbey stood nearby; its fiefs later passed directly under the control of the Basilica of Santa Maria Maggiore in Rome.

Ficulle is first recorded in 1292 as one of the direct domains of the municipality of Orvieto.

In 1432 Ficulle was incorporated into the Papal States. The authority of local lords was curtailed in 1461, when Pope Pius II ordered the exile of Gentile Monaldeschi.

During the Roman Republic of 1798 it formed part of the canton of Orvieto under the Delegation of Viterbo. In the early 19th century, under Napoleonic rule, it became an autonomous canton with a mayor within the district of Todi in the Department of Trasimeno.

After the Restoration of 1815 it returned to the district of Orvieto under the Delegation of Viterbo.

In the mid-19th century Ficulle had a population of 1,850 individuals, of whom 843 resided within the town and 1,007 in the surrounding countryside.

In September 1860 Ficulle was occupied by Garibaldian forces and annexed to the Kingdom of Sardinia.

== Geography ==
Ficulle is situated on a hill at an elevation of 437 metres (1,434 ft) above sea level, about 22 kilometres (14 mi) from Orvieto and not far from the course of the Chiani.

Ficulle is subject to both cold northern and warm southern winds. The town overlooks a wide surrounding landscape.

About 1 mile (1.6 km) from the town are the woods of Monte Albano and Poggio. At a similar distance along the ancient Via Cassia, in a place called Bagnaccio, there is a neglected thermo-sulphurous spring near a small volcanic feature, which was considered suitable for baths. Near the town rises the stream Piscinello, formed from the drainage of public fountains, which flows into the Chiani.

Ficulle borders the following municipalities: Allerona, Fabro, Montegabbione, Orvieto, Parrano, San Venanzo.

=== Subdivisions ===
The municipality includes the localities of Cappuccini, Conventaccio, Ficulle, Olevole, Poggi, Sala, San Cristoforo, San Lazzaro, Santa Cristina.

In 2021, 460 people lived in rural dispersed dwellings not assigned to any named locality. At the time, the most populous locality was Ficulle proper (788).

== Economy ==
Agriculture historically compensated for the limited fertility of the soil. The land produced hemp, oil, and wine, the latter being marketed together with the well-known wine of Orvieto.

The town also had several well-regarded workshops producing pottery.

== Religion and culture ==
=== Santa Maria Vecchia ===
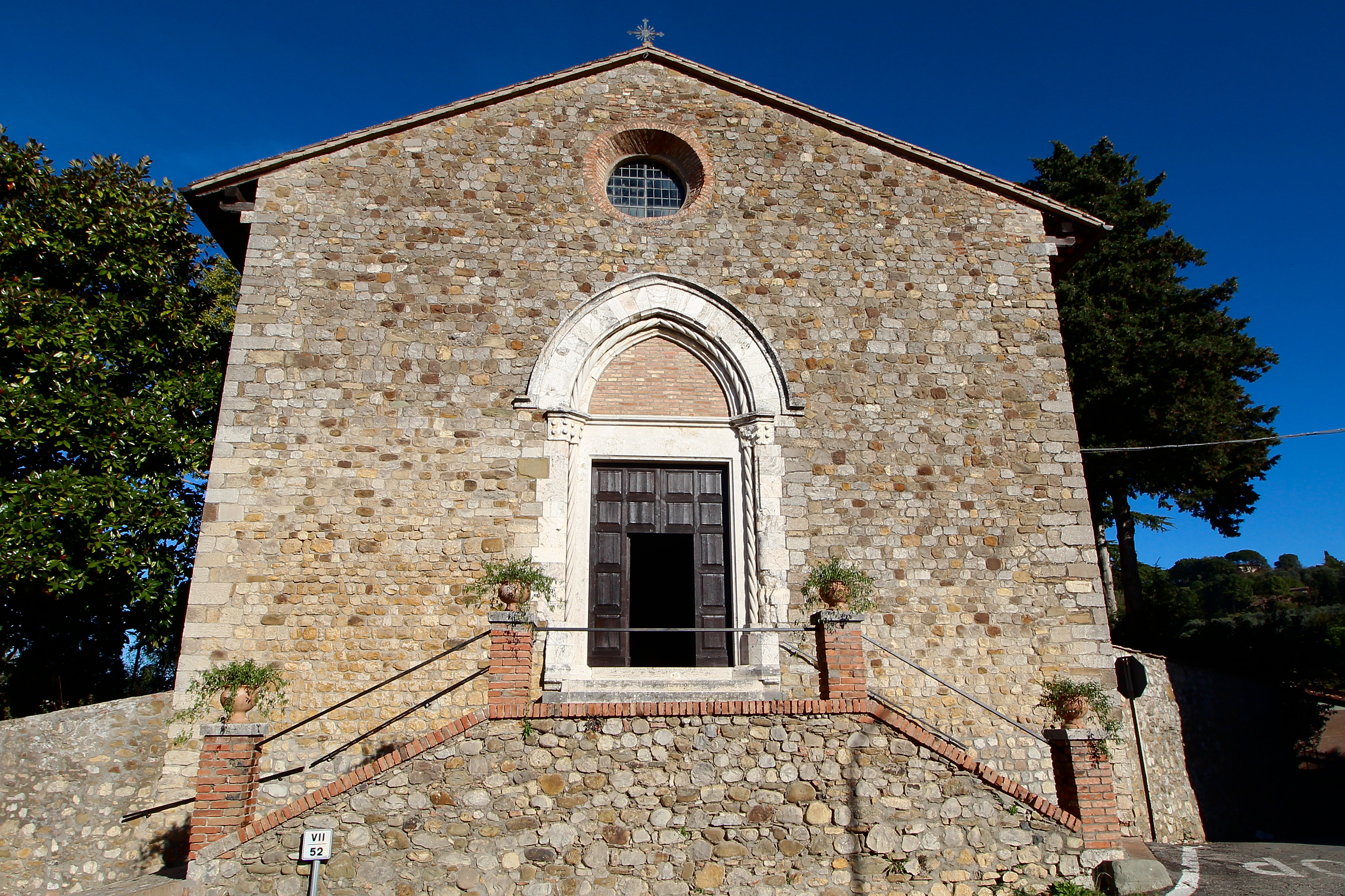
Santa Maria Vecchia

The church of Santa Maria Vecchia served as the parish church until the late 16th century. The façade follows a Gothic layout and includes a 13th-century portal. The entrance is elevated and reached by a double staircase. After restoration, the interior preserves 14th- and 15th-century frescoes, two 16th-century wooden statues representing Saint Christina and the Assumption, and a Roman cippus depicting the god Mithras. The capitals show early medieval bas-reliefs.

=== Madonna della Maestà ===
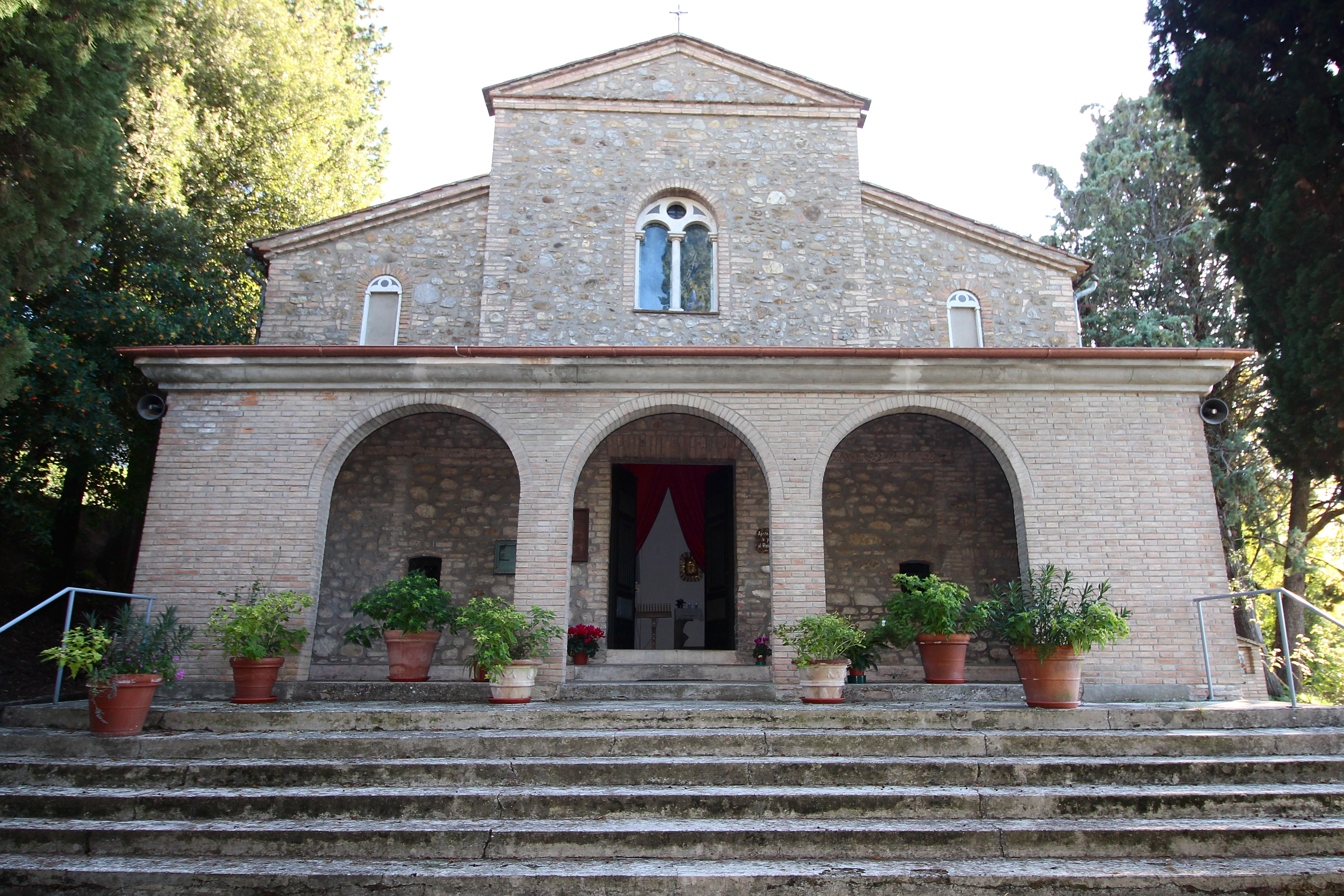
Madonna della Maestà

The earliest certain information about the church of the Madonna della Maestà appears in the early 17th century. By 1616 it was already a center of strong devotion and was recorded with the title Maestà, linked to an image of the Madonna and Child on a cloud throne among angels and saints painted on the rear wall. The original small chapel was enlarged in 1848 and underwent major changes in 1890 with the construction of a twin church. In 1926 the dividing wall was demolished and the two structures received a unified roof. In 1980 the fresco required removal for conservation.

The crown on the Madonna's head, now represented by a copy of the original gold piece, was donated by local residents in gratitude for the community's survival after World War II. In the sacristy an 1799 painting of the Madonna Addolorata is kept. Devotion to the Madonna della Maestà reportedly remains strong, and the feast is celebrated annually on November 21.

=== Other religious heritage ===
The church of San Sebastiano, built in the 15th century, is likewise decorated internally with frescoes that were later covered.

Other churches are located both within the town and in its suburbs, including Santa Vittoria and Annunziata. A church in the southern suburb stands on the site of a former temple of the Sun and houses a venerated statue of the Virgin.

The patron saint of Ficulle is Saint Eumenius, whose feast is celebrated on 18 September.

=== Main sights ===
- Walls and Rocca (fortress)
- Castello della Sala, founded in 1350
- Medieval borough
- Abbey of S. Niccolò al Monte Orvietano

== Notable people ==
Among the most prominent families of Ficulle in the 19th century the Piccini, the Romani, and the Patrizi, noted for their wealth and local influence.

In the 19th century, Francesco Severi, a Tuscan by origin, played a leading role in promoting improvements to the town, including restoration works and urban enhancements.
