= Parrano =

- Comune
- Comune di Parrano
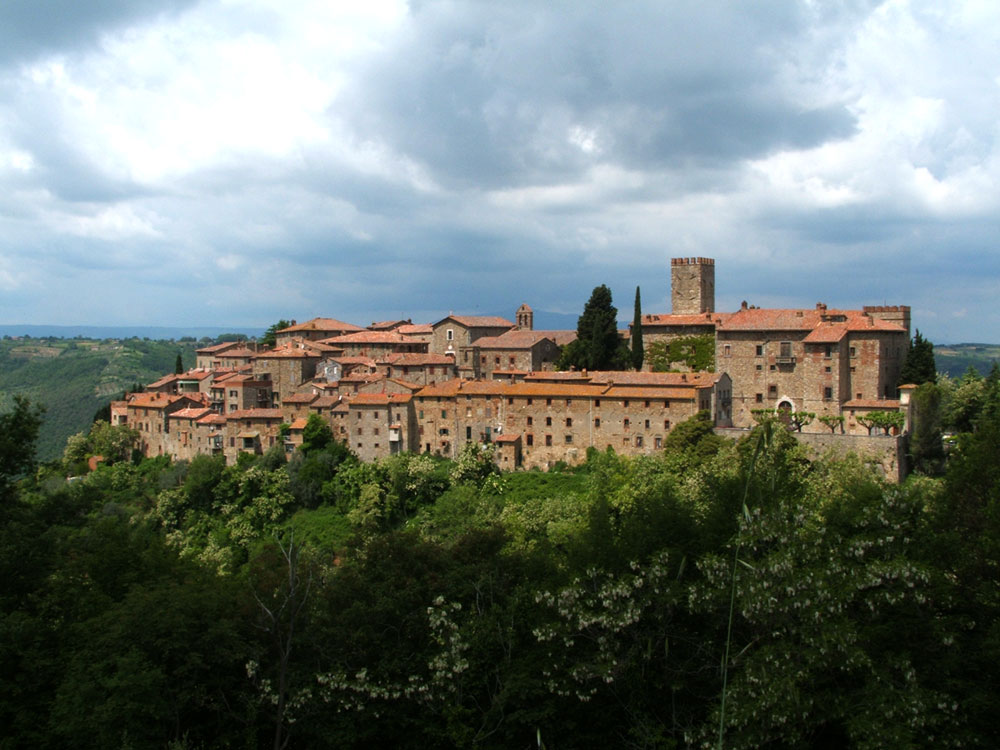
- View of Parrano

- Location within Italy Location within Umbria
- Coordinates: 42.863935°N 12.106552°E
- Country: Italy
- Region: Umbria
- Province: Terni (TR)
- Frazioni: Cantone, Frattaguida, Pievelunga

Government
  - Mayor: Valentino Filippetti

Area
  - Total: 39.9 km^{2} (15.4 sq mi)
- Elevation: 441 m (1,447 ft)

Population (1 January 2025)
  - Total: 490
  - Density: 12/km^{2} (32/sq mi)
- Demonym: Parranesi
- Time zone: UTC+1 (CET)
  - Summer (DST): UTC+2 (CEST)
- Postal code: 05010
- Dialing code: 0763
- Website: Official website

Parrano is a comune (municipality) in the Province of Terni in the Italian region Umbria, located about 35 km southwest of Perugia and about 50 km northwest of Terni.

== History ==
From the early 12th century to 1280, the territory was held by the Bulgarelli counts, a Lombard-origin family known as the counts of Parrano, who received their investiture from the bishops of bishops of Orvieto and whose county extended as far as Marsciano.

Following the extinction of the Bulgarelli line, the domain was united with Montegiove. Over time it passed through the hands of several noble families, including the counts of Corbara, the Monaldeschi della Vipera, and later Gattamelata. In 1460 it came under the control of the counts Di Marsciano.

In 1798, during the period of the Roman Republic, the area was incorporated into the Canton of Orvieto. In the Napoleonic era it formed part of the Department of Trasimeno within the French Empire. After the Restoration it was assigned to the District of Orvieto.

In September 1860, during the campaigns of Italian unification, the territory was occupied by Garibaldian forces under General Luigi Masi and subsequently annexed to the Kingdom of Sardinia.

According to the 1861 census, Parrano had a population of 899 inhabitants.

== Geography ==
Parrano stands on a hill in a relatively enclosed setting. The Chiani River flows at the foot of the hill. The settlement lies about 4 miles (6.4 km) from Ficulle.

There are nearby springs, including one sulphurous and one ferruginous source. Caves covered with notable stalactites are located within the northern hillside. A stream called the Bagno flows nearby, and its bed gives rise to the sulphurous water mentioned above.

Parrano borders the following municipalities: Ficulle, Montegabbione, San Venanzo.

=== Subdivisions ===
The municipality includes the hamlets of Cantone, Lungo, Pieve di Monte, and Spereto. Cantone occupies the summit of a hill known as Poggio di Cantone.

== Economy ==
In the mid-19th century, the local economy was based primarily on agriculture and pastoral activity. Although the land was considered only moderately fertile, it supported grazing, timber production for firewood, and viticulture.

=== Thermal springs ===
Parrano is associated with the presence of numerous springs whose waters have long been used for hydropinic treatments. The thermal complex known as Bagno del Diavolo, located at the base of the village and surrounded by greenery, is used for bathing and wellness-related activities.

== Religion ==
The parish church is dedicated to the Assumption of the Virgin Mary (Santa Maria Assunta). Saint Catherine is regarded as the patron saint of Parrano, and her feast day is celebrated on 25 November.

== Culture and architecture ==
The baronial palace, later owned by the Mariscotti family, is a large structure with a central tower. Inside, it contains a spiral staircase wide enough to allow pack animals to ascend. The main square of the village stands above a large vaulted structure. South of Porta Rupe there is a prominent rocky outcrop noted for its dramatic appearance.

== Notable people ==
Sante De Sanctis, a pioneer in psychology, is among the most prominent people from Parrano.
