= Montegabbione =

- Comune
- Comune di Montegabbione
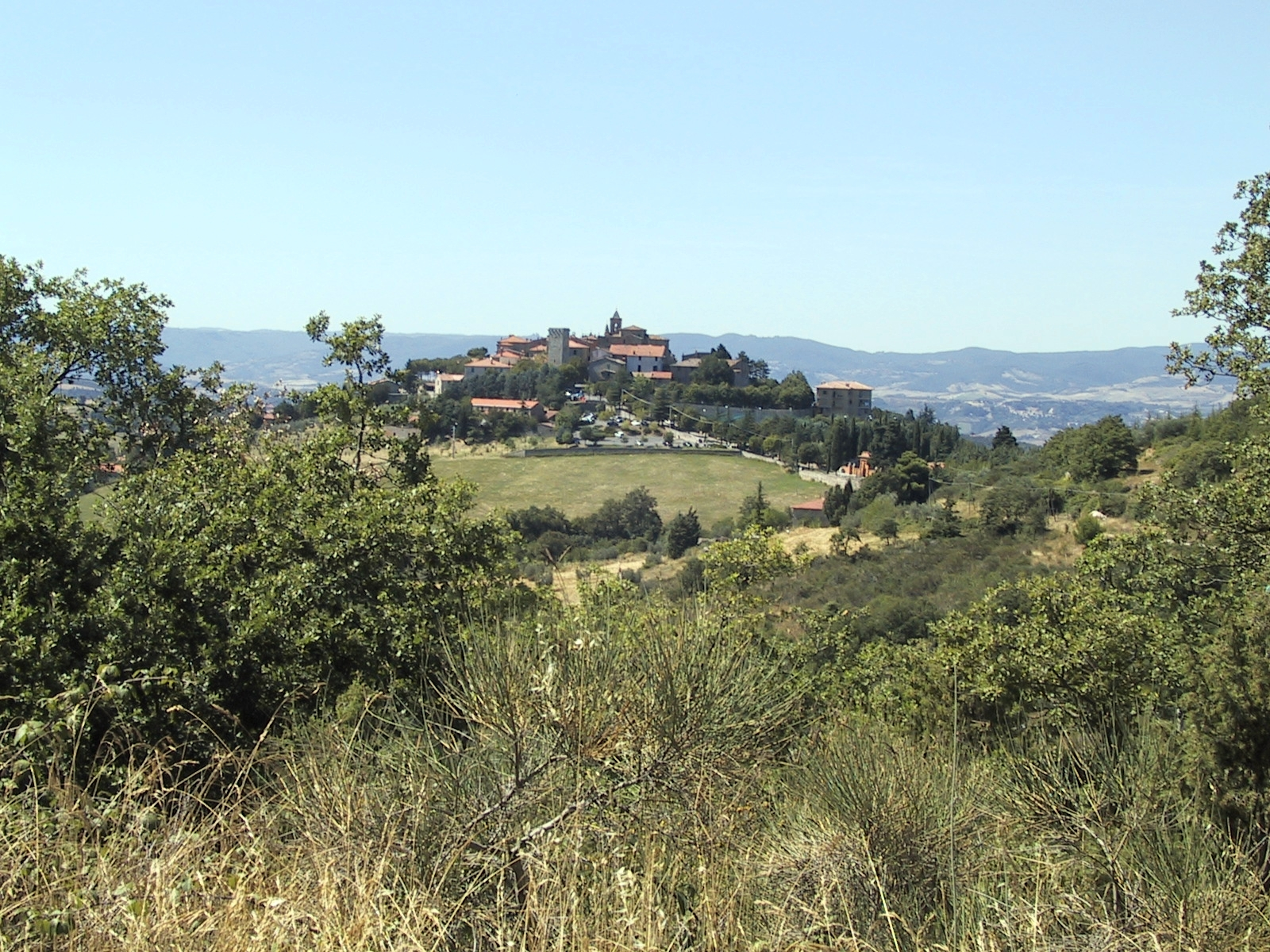
- View of Montegabbione

- Location within Italy Location within Umbria
- Coordinates: 42.921614°N 12.092701°E
- Country: Italy
- Region: Umbria
- Province: Terni (TR)

Government
  - Mayor: Fabio Roncella

Area
  - Total: 51.3 km^{2} (19.8 sq mi)
- Elevation: 594 m (1,949 ft)

Population (1 January 2025)
  - Total: 1,098
  - Density: 21.4/km^{2} (55.4/sq mi)
- Demonym: Montegabbionesi
- Time zone: UTC+1 (CET)
  - Summer (DST): UTC+2 (CEST)
- Postal code: 05010
- Dialing code: 0763
- Website: Official website

Montegabbione is a comune (municipality) in the Province of Terni in the Italian region Umbria, located about 35 kilometres (22 mi) southwest of Perugia and about 60 kilometres (37 mi) northwest of Terni.

== Etymology ==
The name Montegabbione derives from the Latin toponym Mons Capionis, meaning "mount of conquest", or more broadly referring to land held as a fief.

== History ==
In 1345 the castle was held by the Monaldeschi della Vipera, one of the principal branches of the powerful Monaldeschi family of the Orvieto area. In 1354 it was occupied by Ugolino di Montemarte, and in 1370 it was conquered by Guglielmo di Beaufort. In the same year, the stronghold was sold again to Ugolino di Montemarte. Further incursions occurred in 1387, when the counts Di Marsciano intervened in the area.

The medieval defensive structures still visible today attest to its strategic significance in the later Middle Ages.

In 1701, Monte Gabbione was a feudal domain of the city of Orvieto, a status which it retained in 1803 and 1816.

During the Roman Republic of 1798–1799 Montegabbione was included in the Canton of Orvieto. Under Napoleonic rule, between 1809 and 1814, it formed part of the Department of Trasimeno. Following the Restoration in 1816, it was designated a luogo baronale within the Government of Orvieto, in the Delegation of Viterbo.

In 1817 Montegabbione was administratively united with the municipality of Ficulle. On the eve of Italian unification in 1859, it remained dependent on Ficulle within the Province of Orvieto.

In 1858 Montegabbione had a population of 737 inhabitants. Of these, 249 resided within the village itself, while 488 lived in the surrounding countryside.

In 1869 Montegabbione annexed the territory of the suppressed municipality of Montegiove.

In 1927 the frazione of Frattaguida was detached from Montegabbione and transferred to the municipality of Parrano.

== Geography ==
Montegabbione is situated south-west of Montaralle (a corruption of Montereale) ridge. The town stands on a hill and lies about 1 mile (1.6 km) east of Monteleone d'Orvieto and approximately 4 miles (6.4 km) south-east of Città della Pieve. The nearest settlement is Carnaiola, at a distance of 3 miles (4.8 km).

Monte Gabbione stands on a hill at an elevation of 594 metres (1,949 ft), a short distance from the provincial road linking Orvieto and Città della Pieve. Its territory extends partly over mountainous terrain and partly across plains.

Montegabbione borders the following municipalities: Fabro, Ficulle, Monteleone d'Orvieto, Parrano, Piegaro, San Venanzo.

=== Subdivisions ===
The municipality includes the localities of Castel di Fiori, Faiolo, Montegabbione, Montegiove.

In 2021, 252 people lived in rural dispersed dwellings not assigned to any named locality. At the time, the most populous localities were Montegabbione proper (579), and Faiolo (206).

The village of Casteldifiori, within the municipality of Montegabbione, is surrounded by woodland and enclosed by walls that preserve its medieval character. It is dominated by a castle documented from 1350 and by a tower dating to the early 13th century.

== Economy ==
In the mid-19th century the local economy was based largely on agriculture, particularly viticulture and olive cultivation.

== Religion ==
The principal church is dedicated to the Assumption of the Virgin Mary, whose feast is celebrated on 15 August.

=== Madonna delle Grazie ===
The church of Maria SS. delle Grazie stands at the foot of the hill of Montegabbione. Its dedication is characteristic of the Renaissance and reflects its origin as a votive temple. The external architectural form, with a Latin cross plan and cylindrical dome, also belongs to the Renaissance, while the high altar and stucco decoration inside are of Baroque derivation. Of particular artistic interest is the fresco above the high altar depicting a Madonna del latte, attributed to the school of Perugino.

=== Santa Maria Assunta in Cielo ===
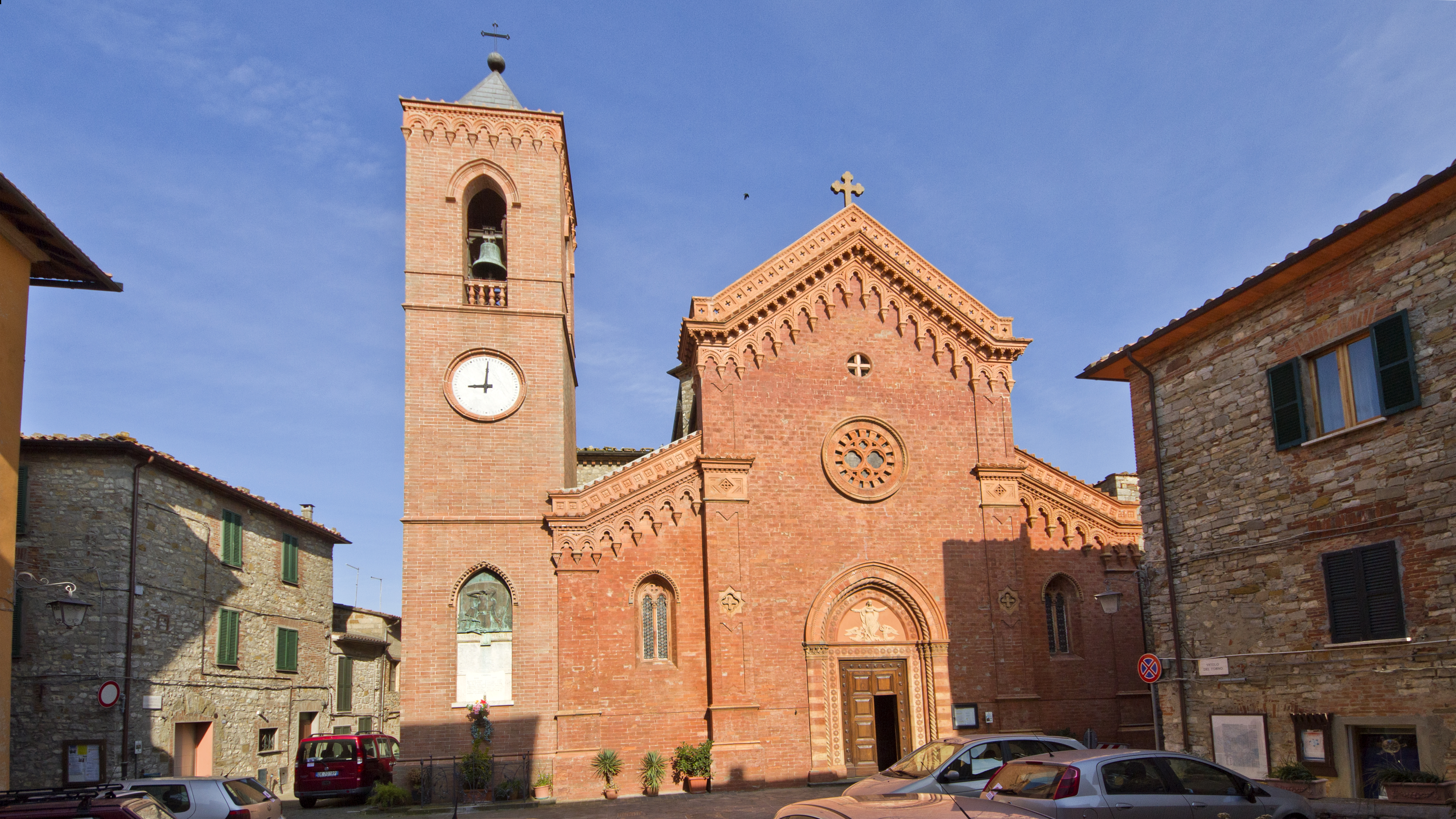
Church of Santa Maria Assunta in Cielo

The church of Santa Maria Assunta in Cielo is the present parish church of Montegabbione. Construction began in 1873, extending an earlier circular chapel and adjoining bell tower, both built in stone and possibly forming part of the former castle complex. The building partly stands on the site of the old cemetery, which was moved outside the walls in 1864. The church is in a Byzantine style and was decorated by the Perugian artists Francesco Biscarini and Raffaele Angeletti. At the rear is an elevated choir loft with a bellows organ made by Nicomede Agati of Pistoia.

=== Other religious buildings ===
In the central square of the village of Casteldifiori stands the church of Santa Maria Maddalena, rebuilt between the 17th and 18th centuries, probably on the site of the earlier castle church. The building, constructed in stone, has a single nave and preserves a Marian wall painting in a niche at the back, as well as a small shrine dedicated to Saint Mary Magdalene along the left wall.
