= San Venanzo =

Municipality in Umbria, Italy

- Comune
- Comune di San Venanzo
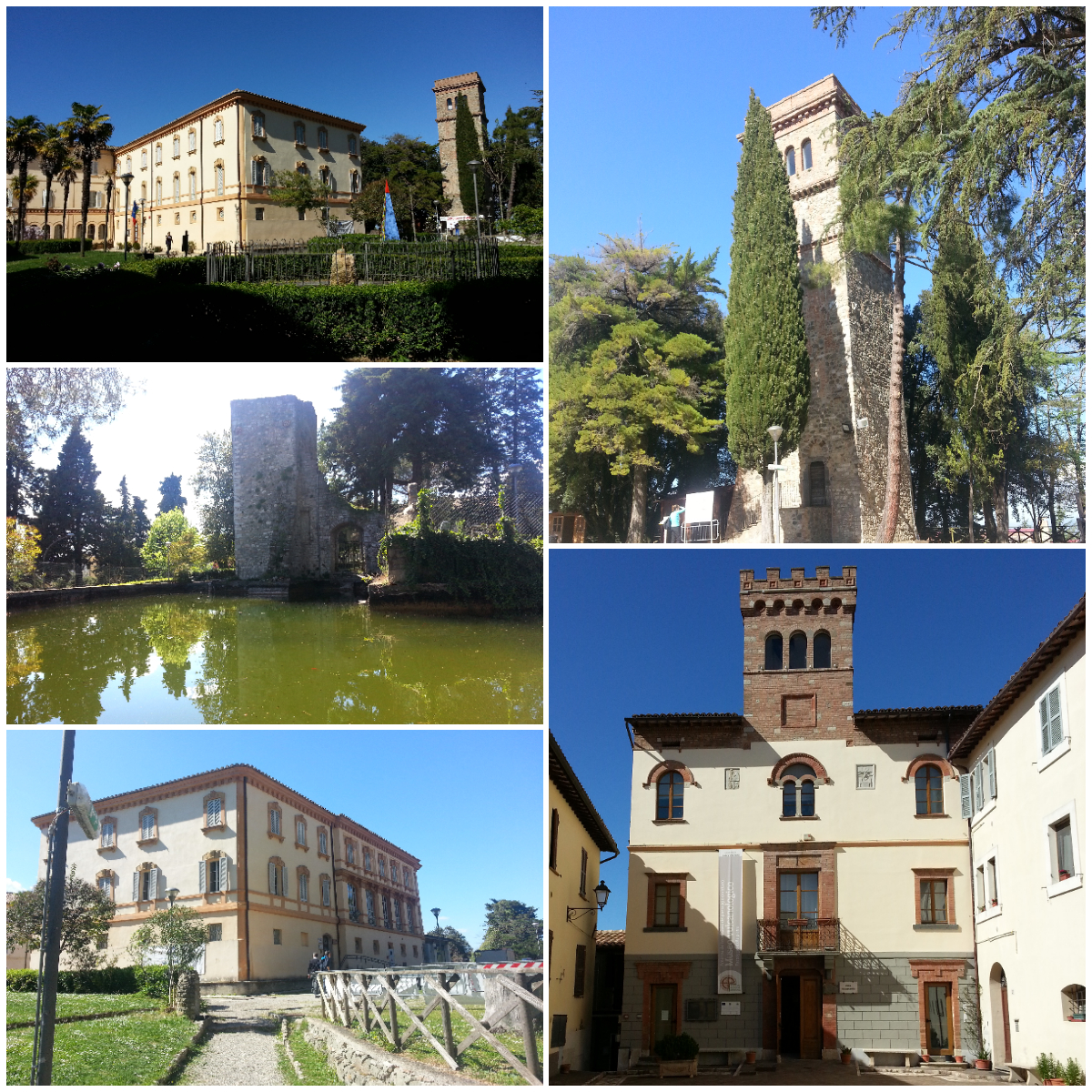

- Location within Italy Location within Umbria
- Coordinates: 42.869146°N 12.266493°E
- Country: Italy
- Region: Umbria
- Province: Terni (TR)

Government
  - Mayor: Marsilio Marinelli

Area
  - Total: 169.45 km^{2} (65.43 sq mi)
- Elevation: 465 m (1,526 ft)

Population (1 January 2025)
  - Total: 2,151
  - Density: 12.69/km^{2} (32.88/sq mi)
- Demonym: Sanvenanzesi
- Time zone: UTC+1 (CET)
  - Summer (DST): UTC+2 (CEST)
- Postal code: 05010
- Dialing code: 075
- Website: Official website

San Venanzo is a comune (municipality) in the Province of Terni in the Italian region Umbria, located about 30 km (19 mi) southwest of Perugia and about 45 km (28 mi) northwest of Terni.

== History ==
The territory of San Venanzo was already inhabited in the Roman era. The first nucleus of the present settlement likely developed around the 8th century, when it emerged as one of the fortified centers established along the Byzantine corridor in central Italy.

During the communal period, the town was involved in the local conflicts that affected the area between Orvieto, Perugia, and Todi. In 1290 it came under the control of the Monaldeschi family of Orvieto.

In the modern period, San Venanzo underwent several administrative changes. In 1816 it was a baronial locality within the District of Orvieto in the Delegation of Viterbo. The following year, in 1817, it was classified as an appodiato of the municipality of Marsciano, in the District of Todi. In 1827 it became an autonomous community with its own podestà, under the government and district of Orvieto. By 1858 it was recognized as a comune under the governmental residence of Orvieto and included the appodiati of Civitella dei Conti, Collelungo, Ripalvella, and Rotecastello.

In 1859 the population numbered 596 inhabitants. Of these, 236 residents lived in the village itself, while 360 were dispersed in the surrounding countryside. All were under the single parish of San Venanzo. In the mid-19th century, contemporary accounts mention the presence of prominent local families, including the Counts Faina and the Valentini family.

In 1860 San Venanzo was annexed to the Kingdom of Sardinia. In 1929 the municipality expanded its territory through the annexation of the suppressed comune of San Vito in Monte.

== Geography ==
San Venanzo is a small walled village situated on a hill on the left bank of the Paglia River, at an elevation of 405 metres (1,329 ft) above sea level. It lies about 28 kilometres (17 mi) from Orvieto and approximately 41 kilometres (25 mi) from Todi.

San Venanzo lies on a hill and mountainous terrain, with an extensive outlook to the east and a more restricted horizon to the west. The nearest town is Marsciano, about 6 miles (9.7 km) away.

San Venanzo borders the following municipalities: Ficulle, Fratta Todina, Marsciano, Monte Castello di Vibio, Montegabbione, Orvieto, Parrano, Piegaro, Todi.

=== Subdivisions ===
The municipality includes the localities of Casalicchio, Castello, Collelungo, Ospedaletto, Poggio Aquilone, Poggio Spaccato, Pornello, Ripalvella, Rotecastello, San Marino, San Venanzo, San Vito in Monte, Vesca.

In 2021, 704 people lived in rural dispersed dwellings not assigned to any named locality. At the time, most of the population lived in San Venanzo proper (892).

==== San Vito ====
San Vito is divided into two sections: San Vito Castello, situated at about 620 meters above sea level, and San Vito in Monte, located below at 520 meters. The site likely originated as a castrum in the 12th century, founded by a Lombard family that expanded its holdings in the area under the authority of the bishop of Orvieto. It was devastated in 1240 during the conflicts between Guelphs and Ghibellines and remained abandoned until 1276, when efforts were made to repopulate and fortify it due to its strategic position. From 1751 it came under the control of the Mariani and Viti families. As of 2026, the castle walls enclose a few private residences; the area is reportedly in a poor state of conservation.

== Economy ==
In the mid-19th century, agriculture formed the basis of the local economy. The area produced grain and olive oil, and there were mills for both.

== Religion ==
The parish church is dedicated to Saint Venantius, the town's patron saint. His feast is celebrated in May.
