= Sante De Sanctis =

Italian physician, psychologist and psychiatrist

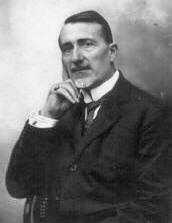
- Sante De Sanctis
- Born: 7 February 1862; Parrano
- Died: 20 February 1935 (aged 73); Rome
- Scientific career
- Fields: psychiatry

Sante De Sanctis (7 February 1862 – 20 February 1935) was an Italian physician, psychologist, and psychiatrist. He is considered one of the founders of the Italian psychology and pediatric psychiatry.

== Life ==
Sante De Sanctis was born on 7 February 1862 in Parrano, where his family had resided since the 16th century. He graduated in medicine at La Sapienza University of Rome with a thesis on aphasia in 1886. He began working in 1891 at the Roman laboratory of pathological anatomy of Santa Maria della Pietà psychiatric hospital, directed by Giovanni Mingazzini. In those years he went to Zurich and Paris to complete his psychiatric studies. De Sanctis, then, started his research on the psychology of dreams and, in 1896, he published "I sogni e il sonno nell'isterismo e nella epilessia", followed by "I sogni: studi psicologici e clinici di un alienista" in 1899, quoted in the treatise "The interpretation of dreams" by Sigmund Freud.

Together with Giuseppe Ferruccio Montesano and Maria Montessori, he was the founder of the Italian child and adolescent psychiatry. In 1898 De Sanctis applied for a license in teaching, rejected in 1901 by the Consiglio Superiore della Pubblica Istruzione. According to the commission, psychology should have been taught by a philosopher and not by a physiologist or psychiatrist. Nevertheless, in December of the same year, the Minister of Education Nunzio Nasi granted his request. In 1906 he obtained one of the first three chairs of Experimental Psychology in the Faculty of Medicine in Rome. Between 1929 and 1930 he worked on the two-volume treatise on experimental psychology, in which he summarized his 25 years of teaching. He organized the 5th International Congress of Psychology in 1905, while in 1910 he was appointed president of the Società Italiana di Psicologia.

The commitment to children with disabilities remained constant throughout his life, to which he dedicated monographic studies such as "Educazione dei deficienti", published in 1915. He also established the first kindergarten-school in via Tasso in Rome and founded the first hospital ward of child and adolescent psychiatry in Italy. He died in Rome in 1935.

=== 5th International Congress of Psychology in Rome ===
On 6 August 1889, only ten years after the establishment of the first laboratory of experimental psychology at the University of Leipzig by Wilhelm Wundt, and in the same year in which the centenary of the French Revolution was celebrated, the 1st International Congress of Physiological Psychology was held in Paris, chaired by the famous neurologist Jean-Martin Charcot. In 1892, 1896 and 1900 the following International Congresses in Europe were held, respectively, in London, Berlin and Paris with an increasing number of participants.

Still, the Roman Congress, organized by Sante De Sanctis, represented an unavoidable turning point for the psychophysiological research, introduced by Wundt to the young scholars who attended the Congress, regarding the new idea of psychology applied to pedagogical, anthropological, juridical and criminological contexts.

The Congress was structured in four sections:

- the experimental Psychology section;
- the Psychopathology section;
- the criminal, pedagogical and social Psychology section;
- the section about psychological introspection.

== Scientific contributions ==
=== Founder of child and adolescent psychiatry ===
With the 1925 treatise on child and adolescent psychiatry, De Sanctis set himself the goal of defining a new discipline, that he considered a branch of psychiatry still too young to be able to abandon clinical-symptomatic observation, but available to follow the new paths indicated by science. In fact, developmental pediatric psychiatry must address those diseases that involve mental disorders and therefore it requires psychic knowledge of the child's development as well as medical knowledge.

The main purpose of the treaty was to offer an overview of the obstacles of the psychiatric diseases of childhood and, indeed, it addressed young psychiatrists and pediatricians who had to deal with a certainly not easy, but full of real satisfaction field. The vision of the child that stood out from the pages of the treatise - and in general in all the writings of De Sanctis - was extremely dynamic. In Italy, between the 19th and 20th centuries, the scientific conception of the child developed: it no longer idealized the childish world as innocent and positive, as in the religious sphere and in the Enlightenment culture, but it was based on an evidence as objective as possible. This scientific-naturalistic approach constituted the ground on which infantile psychiatry could be founded. The active commitment of the Italian psychologist in defining this new discipline was crowned by the foundation - by De Sanctis himself - of the first pediatric psychiatry hospital ward, consisting of an outpatient clinic and an observation center for children with abnormal behavior.

=== Dementia Praecocissima ===
The belief that the child should be regarded as a clinical entity quite distinct from that of the adult helped De Sanctis to reexamine psychopathology from a new perspective, as well as some manifestations of frenzied boys, no longer treated as individual psychopathological entities. This intuition laid the foundation in the studies that Emil Kraepelin had done regarding a syndrome that he had described and referred to as dementia praecox. For the German psychiatrist this concerned pubertal age, that is, after the tenth year of life. It was De Sanctis who observed new cases in prepubertal age.

The problems that De Sanctis had to face were, on one hand, that of establishing the possible connections between phrenasthenia and dementia and, on the other hand, that of demonstrating the existence of a "prepubertal dementia" by defining its onset and course. After the publication in 1906 of some cases of dementia in children aged 6–8, De Sanctis presented in 1908 the report of the observation of a 3-year-old girl to the Regia Accademia di Roma. He claimed he had waited a year before giving a diagnosis because it seemed unlikely that it was a catatonic infantile form of early dementia. The main fact that emerged in the girl's anamnesis was a trauma at 2 years old: he witnessed the death of her mother hit by a tram which caused a growth interruption. He observed behaviors like sleep disturbance, hypertonia in the lower limbs, very slow reactions and apathy. De Sanctis, however, understood that the catatonia of a 3-year-old girl could not have the same pathogenesis as Kraepelin's dementia praecox, and in fact clarified that the very precocious dementia must be kept distinct from phrenasthenia as, unlike the latter, it was treatable and congenital.

=== Founder of experimental psychology ===
The biggest problem for Sante De Sanctis was to find a single method that would have been able to measure and quantify in an objective way empirical data, taking into account also the information that could have been got by the psychophysics data obtained from the experimented subject.

The backbone of De Sanctis' experimental psychology are:

- introspection, that corresponds to retrospection and has to be compared with other methods;
- external observation, that is used to study the gestures, the voice, the acts and the customs;
- psychological experiments.

== Fondo De Sanctis in La Sapienza University ==
The history of the fund dates back to a few years ago when De Sanctis heirs, in particular the professor and lawyer Vittorio De Sanctis and the professor and doctor Cesare De Sanctis, entrusted the professor Giovanni Pietro Lombardo a considerable number of letters addressed to the ancestor and carefully preserved. In the wake of the interest that these correspondences have aroused among scholars and to continue the work of enhancing the sources, the entire documentary nucleus has now been rearranged by creating an archival collection called the Fondo Sante De Sanctis.

The fund was divided into two series called serie 1 "Corrispondenze" and serie 2 "Fotografie". It has 181 sequentially numbered issues containing 893 pieces for a total of 1798 pages.

== Opera Sante De Sanctis Onlus ==
The Opera Sante De Sanctis Onlus is an association for the therapy and rehabilitation of the psychophysically handicapped, founded in 1898. It has been managed by the De Sanctis family since its foundation and has been at the service of disabled people of all ages for over 100 years, by applying the scientific method developed by Sante De Sanctis. It has played a pioneering role in the use of innovative or experimental rehabilitation techniques associated with ordinary rehabilitation techniques. Indeed, the concept of rehabilitation, at the time of the association's foundation, was still practically unknown compared to its modern meaning.

== Some writings ==
- I sogni. Studi psicologici e clinici di un alienista, Bocca, Torino 1899
- Educazione dei deficienti, Vallardi, Milano 1915
- I sogni e il sonno nell'isterismo e nella epilessia, Società editrice Dante Alighieri, Roma 1896
- La mimica del pensiero, Sandron, Palermo 1904
- Su di un nuovo procedimento per lo studio del lavoro mentale, Rivista di Psicologia, 5, Bologna 1911, pp. 216–217
- Neuropsichiatria infantile. Patologia e diagnostica, Stock, Roma 1925
- Guida pratica alla Semeiotica neuro-psichiatrica dell'età evolutiva, Bardi, Roma 1934
- Psicologia e psicopatologia, Rivista di Psicologia, vol. 30 (1), pp. 1–12, 1934

== Bibliography ==
- Bianchi di Castelbianco, Federico, Sante De Sanctis: "Conoscenza ed esperienza in una prospettiva psicologica", Magi Edizioni, Roma 1998, pp. 234
- Canastrelli, Leandro, "Ricordo di Sante De Sanctis", Rivista di psicologia, 56, 1962
- Cimino, Guido, Lombardo, Giovanni Pietro (a cura di), "Sante De Sanctis tra psicologia generale e psicologia applicata", Franco Angeli, Milano 2004
- Di Tullio, Benigno, "Ricordi di Sante De Sanctis criminologo", Rivista di psicologia, 56, 1962
- Ferreri, Antonio Marino, "I sogni nella psicologia di Sante De Sanctis", Magi Edizioni, Roma 2008, pp. 336
- Fiasconaro, Laura, "Sante De Sanctis", in Dizionario Biografico degli Italiani, Vol. 39, 1991
- Gozzano, Mario, "Ricordo di Sante De Sanctis pioniere della neuropsichiatria infantile", Rivista di psicologia, 56, 1962
- Lombardo, Giovanni Pietro, "Il V congresso internazionale di psicologia a Roma e la prospettiva criminologica di Jose’ Ingegnieros tra Italia, Argentina e Spagna", Atti del convegno di Pavia, 2018
- Lombardo, Giovanni Pietro, "Le origini della Neuropsichiatria infantile nell’Università di Roma: la dementia praecocissima", Università La Sapienza, Roma 2017
- Lombardo, Giovanni Pietro, Cicciola, Elisabetta (inventario a cura di), "Il Fondo Sante De Sanctis 1893-1935", Roma 2012, pp. 91
- Lombardo, Giovanni Pietro, Cicciola, Elisabetta, "La docenza universitaria di Sante De Sanctis nella storia della psicologia italiana", Teorie e Modelli, 10, 2005, pp. 5–43
- Lombardo, Giovanni Pietro, Foschi, Renato, "Sante De Sanctis research on dreams and his relationships with German-speaking scholars". Physis, 47, 2010, pp. 1–2, 133-146
- Monuments and memories of Sante De Sanctis in Himetop - The History of Medicine Topographical Database
