= Allerona =

- Comune
- Comune di Allerona
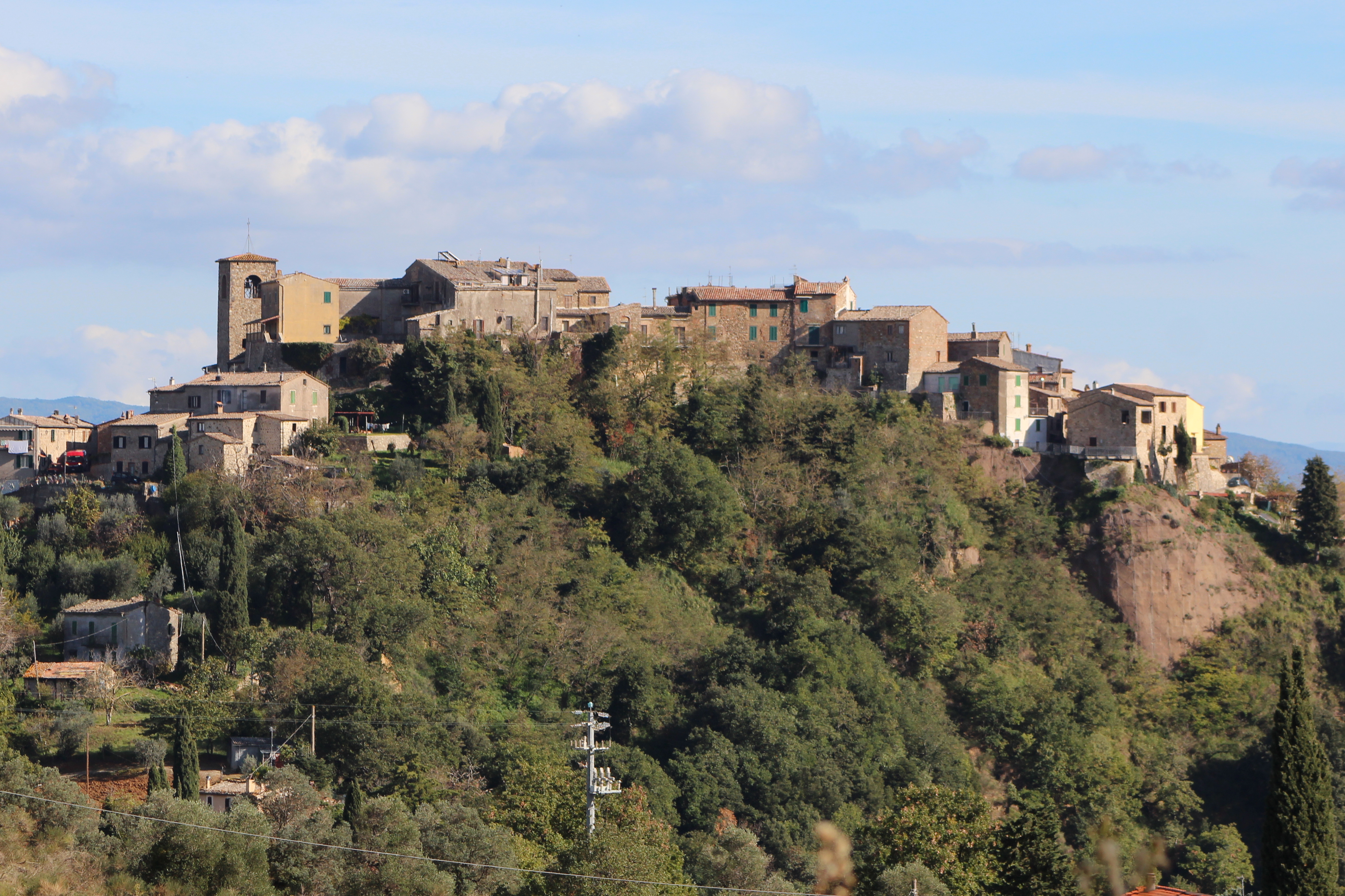
- View of Allerona

- Coat of arms

- Location of Allerona in Italy Allerona (Umbria)
- Coordinates: 42.811518°N 11.9738°E
- Country: Italy
- Region: Umbria
- Province: Terni (TR)

Government
  - Mayor: Sauro Basili

Area
  - Total: 82.61 km^{2} (31.90 sq mi)
- Elevation: 472 m (1,549 ft)

Population (1 January 2025)
  - Total: 1,687
  - Density: 20.42/km^{2} (52.89/sq mi)
- Demonym: Alleronesi
- Time zone: UTC+1 (CET)
  - Summer (DST): UTC+2 (CEST)
- Postal code: 05010
- Dialing code: 0763
- Patron saint: St. Ansano
- Saint day: December 1
- Website: Official website

Allerona (historically known as Lerona) is a comune (municipality) in the Province of Terni in the Italian region Umbria, located about 50 km southwest of Perugia and about 60 km northwest of Terni. It is one of I Borghi più belli d'Italia ("The most beautiful villages of Italy").

== Etymology ==
The name Allerona derives from lerona or vallerona, a term referring to the strawberry tree (arbutus unedo), which grew in the surrounding woods, particularly to the south of the town.

== History ==
The area was inhabited in antiquity by a settlement known as vicus Lerona, of Roman or pre-Roman origin, which was destroyed during the Germanic invasions.

During the Roman period the territory was crossed by the Via Cassia and the Via Traiana Nova, forming part of the route between Rome and Chiusi. Remains of this road survive, including paved sections and two milestones.

By the early Middle Ages, before the year 1000, a castle had been founded, serving as a fortress of Orvieto toward the north, in the direction of Chiusi. Control of the settlement was held by the Monaldeschi and later by the Filippeschi families. Elements of the medieval structure remain, including sections of the walls, the Porta Del Sole, the Porta Della Luna, and the urban layout.

The military campaign of Charles VIII of France in Italy in 1494–1495 led to the sack and destruction of the territory of Orvieto, including the castle of Allerona.

Municipal autonomy was established in 1585, when a statute was issued by Andrea Gavanni at the town hall of Orvieto.

Allerona formed part of the Papal States in the early modern period. During the Napoleonic era it was included in the Department of Trasimeno. After the Restoration it was placed within the Delegation of Viterbo.

In 1860 the town was occupied by the Cacciatori del Tevere under Luigi Masi and subsequently annexed to the Kingdom of Italy.

In 1895 Allerona had a population of 1,486 inhabitants.

On 28 January 1944, Allied bombing at Allerona struck a train carrying prisoners of war, causing over 400 casualties.

== Geography ==
Allerona is a small settlement situated between the Paglia River Valley and the Valdichiana, at an elevation of 472 metres (1,549 ft) above sea level. It lies about 19 kilometres (12 mi) from Orvieto and 10 kilometres (6.2 mi) west of Ficulle.

Allerona retains ancient walls with remains of battlements. To the south of the settlement there were dense woods, including areas known as the Bandita del Monte and the Banditella.

The climate is described as rather cold, with winds from the north and south prevailing. Nearby watercourses include the Rivalcale and the Rio Torto.

The land is a mix of sand and clay soils, representing an ancient coastline where fossilized seashells can be found dating back a million years in the ancient sand dunes. Along the river that meanders on the valley west of the Autostrada, is an ancient Roman road. The fog settles in the valley quite often, leaving the hilltop village visible at a distance.

=== Subdivisions ===
The municipality includes the localities of Allerona, Allerona Scalo, Pratale.

In 2021, 219 people lived in rural dispersed dwellings not assigned to any named locality. At the time, the most populous localities were Allerona Scalo (1,081), and Allerona proper (309).

Allerona Scalo is the valley settlement of the municipality, while Allerona Alta is the historic hill town; the Scalo contains a few bars, restaurants, grocers, and other services.

=== Parks and forests ===
The Parco di Villalba is a wooded area of over 20 hectares (49 acres) situated at an elevation between 600 metres (2,000 ft) and 700 metres (2,300 ft). It lies near the border with the Monte Rufeno Nature Reserve and within the state forest of Selva di Meana, forming part of a broader interregional park.

The woodland is managed as high forest and is dominated by oak species, with the presence of other trees such as maples, ashes, beeches, and chestnuts. Among the undergrowth are notable species including the rare dittany, while more than thirty species of wild orchids have been recorded within the park.

The fauna includes various ungulates, particularly wild boar, as well as fallow deer and roe deer, alongside numerous birds of prey.

== Economy ==
In the late 19th century the surrounding territory produced wine, cereals, oil, acorns, and supported pasture. Industrial activity included the production of potash and bricks. The presence of lignite within the territory also constituted a natural resource.

The area is home to a few wine producers, in particular the brand Argilae, that has a tasting room in Allerona Scalo, and named for the distinctive clay soil of the area. The area supports olive oil producers as well.

== Religion and culture ==
The principal church is the pieve of Santa Maria della Stella. The patron saint is Saint Ansanus, a Roman martyr, whose feast is celebrated on 1 December.

=== Church of Santa Maria Assunta ===
The parish church of Santa Maria Assunta, dating to the 15th century, is located within the historic center of Allerona and is documented as a collegiate church from 1275. By the early 16th century it was enriched with a panel by Niccolò Alunno depicting the Assumption of the Virgin surrounded by angels. The work originally included side panels with figures of Saint John the Baptist and Saint Sebastian, now preserved in the National Museum of Castel Sant'Angelo in Rome.

The church also contains a fresco by il Pordenone commissioned in 1516 by Pantasilea Baglioni, widow of Bartolomeo d'Alviano. The fresco depicts the patron alongside a Madonna and saints.

=== Villa Cahen ===
Villa Cahen was built in 1880 by the Jewish financier Edouard Cahen, who had acquired a large estate from the Bourbon del Monte family in the area known as Selva di Meana.

The property is distinguished by an extensive Italian-style garden containing a wide variety of tree and herb species, including rare examples collected from distant regions. The layout reflects a carefully designed composition enriched by both natural and artificial elements, forming a notable example of Liberty-style landscaping. The complex also includes a limonaia and greenhouses used to protect plants during winter, as well as a Japanese garden located within the park between the Italian garden and the greenhouses.

The villa is characterized by light-colored walls and articulated volumes, including a tower element. The interior is arranged over multiple levels, with service areas in the semi-basement, reception and dining rooms on the ground floor, private rooms for the owners above, and additional quarters for servants.

== Notable people ==
Luigi Bellafronte of Allerona was noted as an improvisational poet.

In 19th century sources, the Bernardini family is mentioned as the most prominent family of Allerona.
