= Monteleone d'Orvieto =

- Comune
- Comune di Monteleone d'Orvieto
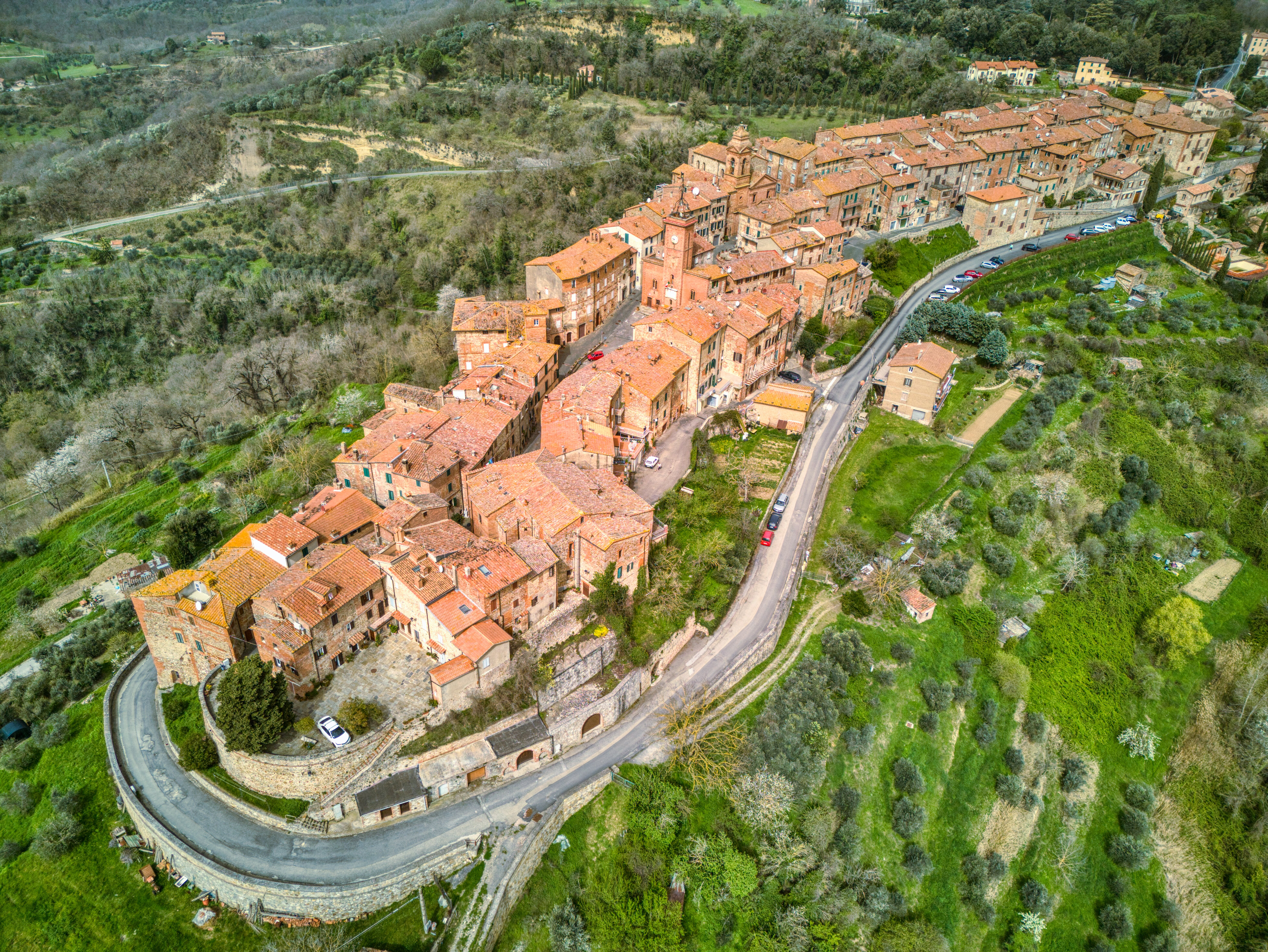
- View of Monteleone d'Orvieto

- Coat of arms

- Location within Italy Location within Umbria
- Coordinates: 42.916446°N 12.051389°E
- Country: Italy
- Region: Umbria
- Province: Terni (TR)

Government
  - Mayor: Angelo Larocca

Area
  - Total: 23.9 km^{2} (9.2 sq mi)
- Elevation: 500 m (1,600 ft)

Population (1 January 2025)
  - Total: 1,357
  - Density: 56.8/km^{2} (147/sq mi)
- Demonym: Monteleonesi
- Time zone: UTC+1 (CET)
  - Summer (DST): UTC+2 (CEST)
- Postal code: 05017
- Dialing code: 0763
- Patron saint: St. Theodore, St. Paul and St. Peter
- Saint day: June 29
- Website: Official website

Monteleone d'Orvieto is a comune (municipality) in the Province of Terni in the Italian region Umbria, located about 35 km southwest of Perugia and about 60 km northwest of Terni. It is one of I Borghi più belli d'Italia ("The most beautiful villages of Italy").

== Etymology ==
Monteleone was so named by Pope Leo IX.

== History ==
The settlement was founded between 1050 and 1052 by Orvieto, which built a castle to guard its northern borders toward Chiusi, Perugia and Siena. From its origin it was equipped with strong defensive walls.

During the 12th and 13th centuries it was held by the Monaldeschi and was involved in conflicts with the counts of Marsciano at Castel Brandetto and with the Bandini of Città della Pieve. In 1328 the castle was burned by the Filippeschi.

In 1373 it was taken by force by the Viscount of Turenne, who believed the fief to belong to the territory of Chiusi. In 1374 he sold it to the noble Montemarte family, from whom he recovered it in 1377.

Monteleone was later held by the Lorena and the Della Rovere. In 1498 Pope Alexander VI granted it to his son Cesare. Two years later, in 1500, it was seized by the Bandini.

In 1701, Monteleone was a feudal domain of the city of Orvieto, a status which it retained in 1803 and 1816.

During the French invasion of 1798–1814 the town followed the course of events affecting other Umbrian localities. A motu proprio issued on 6 July 1816 by Pope Pius VII classified it as a baronial place.

In 1860 it was occupied by the Garibaldian captain Luigi Masi and annexed to the Kingdom of Italy.

In 1895 Monteleone di Orvieto had about 2,000 inhabitants.

== Geography ==
Monteleone di Orvieto is a located about 7 kilometres (4.3 mi) from Città della Pieve, on an elevated hill at 495 metres (1,624 ft) above sea level. From this position it enjoys a wide view over the Valdichiana.

Monteleone lies 8 miles (13 km) from Ficulle and 3 miles (4.8 km) from Montegabbione. The town is situated on elevated ground and was described as having a rather cold winter climate.

=== Subdivisions ===
The municipality includes the localities of Monteleone d'Orvieto, San Lorenzo, Santa Maria, Volpara.

In 2021, 224 people lived in rural dispersed dwellings not assigned to any named locality. At the time, the most populous localities were Monteleone d'Orvieto proper (516), and Santa Maria (507).

== Religion and culture ==
=== Pietro e Paolo ===
The parish church of Santi Pietro e Paolo was at the center of the earliest nucleus of the castle of Monteleone di Orvieto. A portico once stood in front of and alongside it; traces of this remain visible on the north-side wall. Over the centuries it underwent transformations; between 1815 and 1821 the brick façade and bell tower were built. The bell tower has four bells, including the largest, located on the north side and known as the Campanone. The church now has three naves.

The altarpiece is attributed to the school of Perugino, and depicts the Madonna and Child flanked by the Apostles Peter and Paul, with Christ rising from the tomb in the lunette above. A later reference in the text notes differing scholarly opinions on attribution, with Guardabassi assigning it to Perugino, while Gnoli proposed Giacomo di Guglielmo da Città della Pieve, a collaborator on Perugino's later works.

Where the old choir once stood, the apse was created, and beneath it a crypt was built to house the body of Saint Theodorus the Martyr. An altar dedicated to the Annunciation stands to the left of the high altar, while to the right is the Cappella del Sacro Cuore, commissioned by the community to mark the end of World War II.

=== Santissimo Crocefisso ===
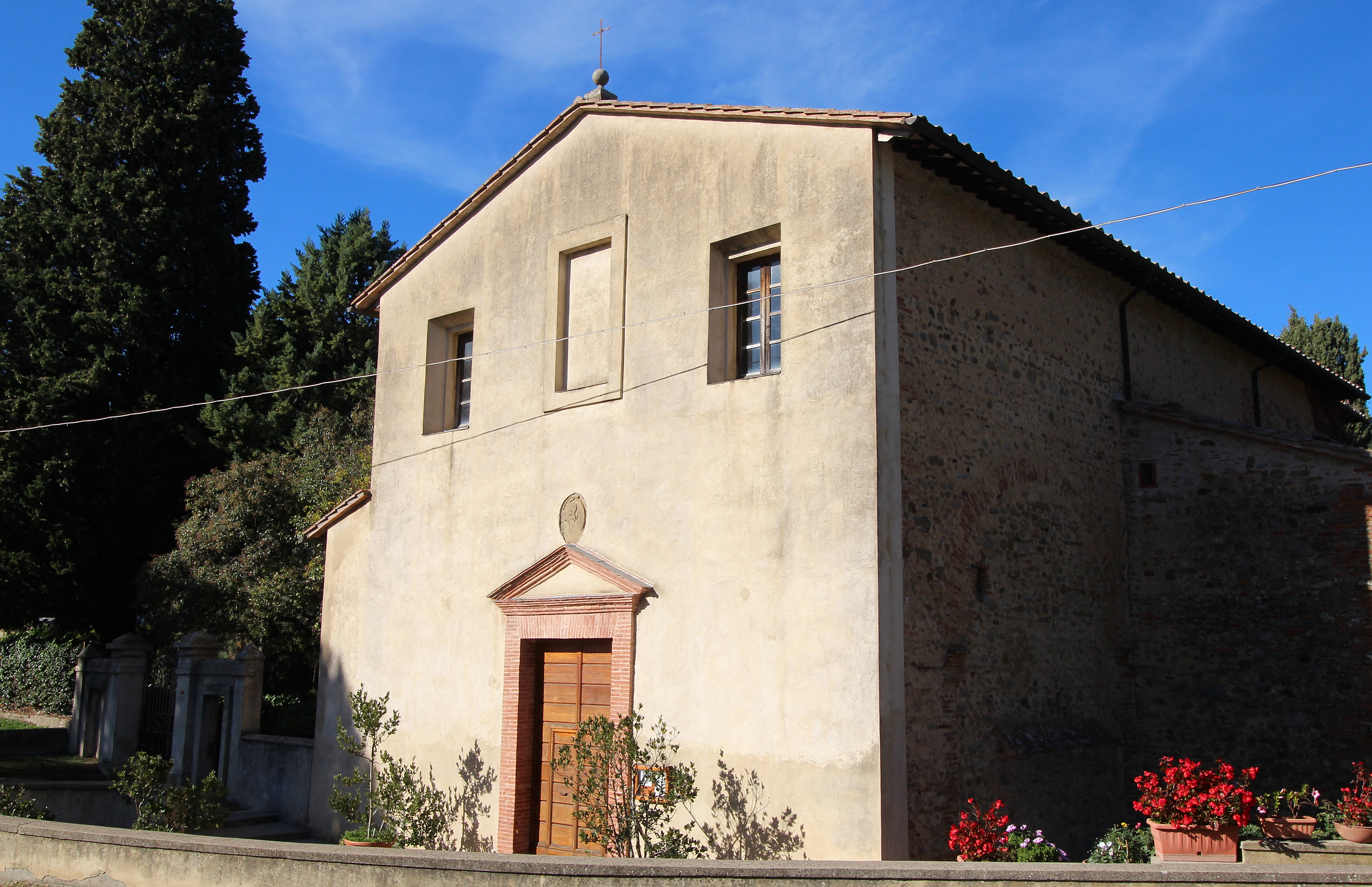
Chiesa del Crocifisso

The church of Santissimo Crocefisso dates to the 17th century. A small earlier chapel once stood on the site, with a Crucifixion painted on its back wall, and miracles were attributed to the image. In 1601 the local administration, prompted by the population, sought authorization from ecclesiastical authorities to build a church around the chapel. Construction began in 1612 to a design by the architect Francesco Scalza of Orvieto, son of Ippolito Scalza.

The church was opened in 1633; six painted panels on the pilasters, with themes related to the Passion of Jesus, date to that period. From the original chapel, only the back wall with the image of the Santissimo Crocefisso was retained to form the altar of the new church. In the early 1700s a wooden altarpiece structure was made, and later in the same century two side chapels were built.

=== Other religious buildings ===
Other churches include Madonna della Torre; the church of the Morte; the church of the Most Holy Annunciation; that of Saint Anthony of Padua, connected with the Mariottini palace; and Saint Roch and Saint Angelo, both outside the town.

=== Teatro dei Rustici ===
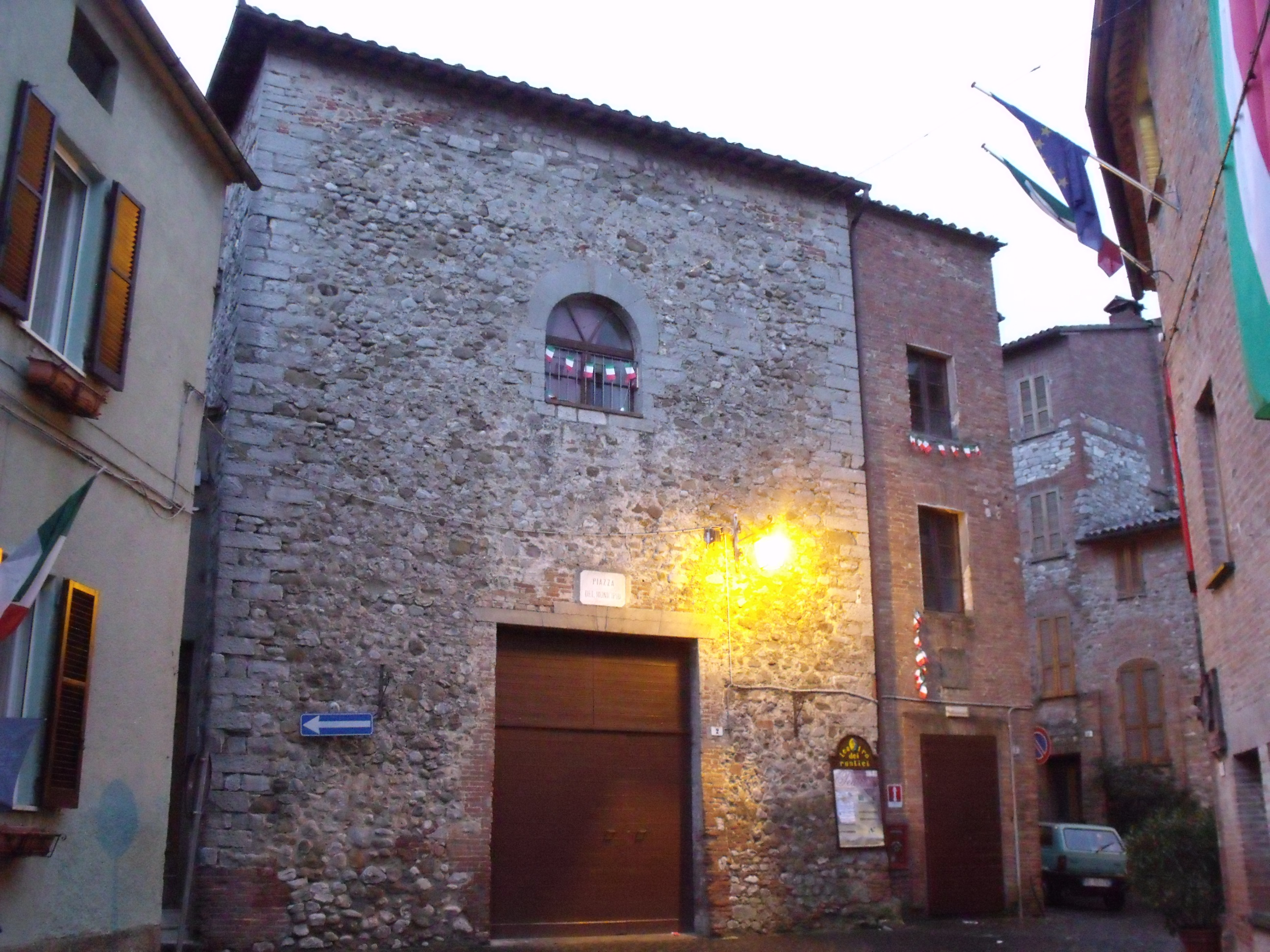
Teatro dei Rustici

The Teatro dei Rustici was originally the granary of the town's former palazzo pubblico, a function recalled by a tempera inscription at the entrance of the hall.

The theater was created in 1732 on the initiative of young residents who asked the municipality for permission to stage comedies during the Carnival period. Over time the building was expanded and restored several times, including a major intervention in 1894. Today it has a horseshoe-shaped plan with two tiers of boxes and a capacity of up to 96 seats.

=== Other cultural heritage ===
The Torre dell'orologio was built in the late 19th century. The tower displays the dial of a large clock whose hands were driven by a pendulum mechanism with stone weights descending within the tower. The façade also features a terracotta bas-relief of Monteleone's coat of arms.

Other sights include:

- Remains of the medieval walls, including the northern gate.
- Medieval Torrione ("Big Tower"), offering a wide panorama of Umbria, Tuscany and Lazio.
- Castel Brandetto (11th century, destroyed in 1350). Now it is a private-owned residence showing few remains of the medieval edifice.

== Notable families ==
The town is recorded as the birthplace of Consiglio Dardalini, a noted mosaicist and head of the craftsmen responsible for the façade of Orvieto Cathedral.

Among the principal families recorded in the 19th century were the Lemmi, Marocchi, and Brizi.
