= Raspanti =

Raspanti is a surname. Notable people with the surname include:

- Antonino Raspanti (born 1959), Italian Roman Catholic bishop
- Celeste Raspanti (born 1928), American playwright
