= Morettini =

Morettini is an Italian surname. Notable people with the surname include:

- Marino Morettini (1931–1990), Italian cyclist
- Mark Morettini (born 1962), American actor
- Michele Morettini (born 1991), Italian cricketer
