= Paglia (river) =

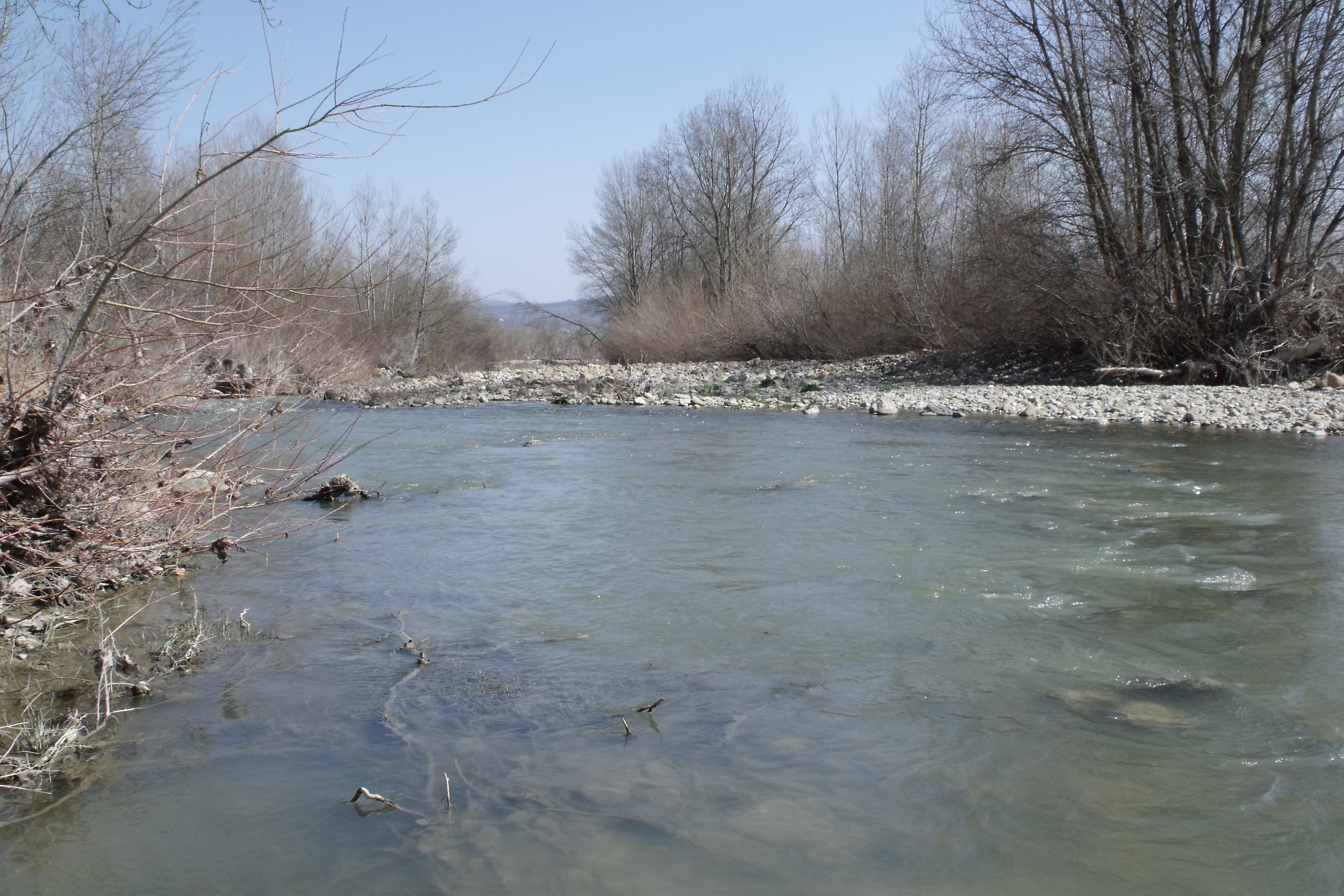
- The Paglia near Ponte a Rigo (San Casciano dei Bagni)

Location
- Country: Italy

Physical characteristics
- Mouth: Tiber
  - coordinates: 42.6945°N 12.1959°E

Basin features
- Progression: Tiber→ Tyrrhenian Sea

The Paglia is an Italian river and a tributary of the Tiber.

It rises on the southern slopes of Monte Amiata (1,738 m) on the Plain of Rena near the town of Abbadia San Salvatore. It flows through the provinces of Siena, Viterbo and Terni, and flows into the Tiber to the south-east of Orvieto. It is approximately 86 km long and its flow is highly seasonal. Its largest tributary is the Chiani.

== Wartime incident ==
On 28 January 1944, during World War II, the Orvieto North railway bridge over the Paglia River at Allerona was struck during an aerial bombardment carried out by the American 320th Bombardment Group. A train carrying Allied prisoners of war was on the bridge at the time. Most of the prisoners had been held at Camp P.G. 54, Fara in Sabina, 35 kilometres north of Rome, and had been evacuated in advance of the Allied advance. Among those on board was Richard Morris of the U.S. Army, who had been captured at Venafro and subsequently imprisoned at Frosinone before being transferred to P.G. 54. According to his memoirs, the train was halted on the bridge when the bombing began, and the German guards left the train while the prisoners remained locked inside. Some prisoners escaped through openings in the boxcars caused by the explosions and reached the river below. In her diary War in Val d'Orcia, Anglo-American historian Iris Origo recorded that several carriages fell into the river and referred to more than four hundred dead and wounded.
