= Luogo baronale =

Feudal territories within the Papal States

A luogo baronale (plural: luoghi baronali) was a feudal barony within the Papal States that, although subject to Papal sovereignty, was governed by ecclesiastical or noble lords exercising jurisdiction over their communities.

== Overview ==
Alongside directly administered territories, the Papal States included numerous feudal baronies held by ecclesiastical bodies and noble families. These territories were governed by their respective lords yet remained within the broader framework of papal sovereignty.

In the census of 1701, the feudal lands together contained about 264,000 inhabitants and were organized into more than 500 parishes. Most of these territories were controlled by the papal aristocracy, while a smaller portion belonged to religious institutions.

== History ==
=== Decline ===
Between the mid-15th century and the end of the 18th century, feudal jurisdictions were progressively reduced in importance within the Papal State.

In the mid-15th century, more than half of the territory of the Papal State was still under feudal jurisdiction. Feudal lords were present not only in rural areas but also within major administrative and episcopal sees.

During the 16th century, feudal jurisdiction underwent a significant reduction, disappearing from many major cities and becoming less central to the political structure. At the same time, new feudal baronies were occasionally created by papal policy.

By the mid-17th century, following events such as the Wars of Castro, feudal jurisdiction had become a residual phenomenon, with large lordships disappearing and being replaced by small and fragmented jurisdictions. By the 18th century, feudal power had been largely marginalized and confined to peripheral areas.

=== Abolition ===
In 1815, with the second restoration following the collapse of Napoleonic control, the Papal government reoccupied its territories and reasserted sovereignty. In the provinces recovered in July 1815 — Bologna, the Legations, the Marche and Benevento — feudal jurisdictions were abolished outright. In Umbria and Lazio they formally remained in force, but new fiscal burdens led most barons to renounce their rights within a few years.

The reform of 1816 introduced administrative uniformity across the state, revoked municipal statutes, and reorganized the territory into delegations headed by Papal delegates. Barons who wished to retain jurisdiction were required to contribute substantially to state expenses, which encouraged renunciation of feudal powers. Subsequent reforms further reduced special jurisdictions, completing the transition to a standardized provincial administration.

== Major proprietors in 1701 ==
At the time of the 1701 census, the principal feudal proprietors within the Papal States included the abbot of Subiaco, the cardinal dean of Velletri, Duke Cesarini, Prince Barberini, Prince Pamphili, Prince Borghese, and the Constable Colonna. These ecclesiastical and aristocratic landlords together held roughly one third of the feudal lands of the state, including some of its most densely inhabited districts.

== Statutes and local governance ==
In the luoghi baronali, local statutes evolved from early communal participation into instruments of baronial absolutism. In the era of the great communal liberties, statutes in feudal castles often took the form of a pact between baron and people, with the community formally convoked and a notary drafting the charter; such statutes could bind even the lord, as in Nonantola.

Popular participation appeared in multiple forms: the statute of Pontecorvo (1190) originated from the baron's consent to vassals' petitions; that of Atina (1195) recognized existing customs; Vicovaro (1273) was compiled by will of both lord and people.

By the 15th century liberties declined: the people were stripped of power, and barons legislated by command. Giorgio Santacroce drafted the statute of Vejano in 1571; Cardinal Ascanio Sforza extended statutes already in force elsewhere by decree. Statutes became rarer, and barons increasingly legislated through bans, edicts, and decrees. Baronial discretion increasingly governed interpretation of statutes and bans.

Repeated papal legislation sought to impose uniform observance even in the luoghi baronali: a bull of Pius V prohibited new infeudations; Innocent XIII (1723) and Benedict XIV (1747) reaffirmed earlier constitutions, and ordered that their penal police bans be observed also in baronial places; a ban of 1645 concerning the carrying of arquebuses was to apply throughout the Papal State.

Despite this, diverse jurisdictions persisted until Pius VII's motu proprio of 1816 dealt a decisive blow to feudalism.

== See also ==
- Feudalism
- History of the Papal States
