= Chiani =

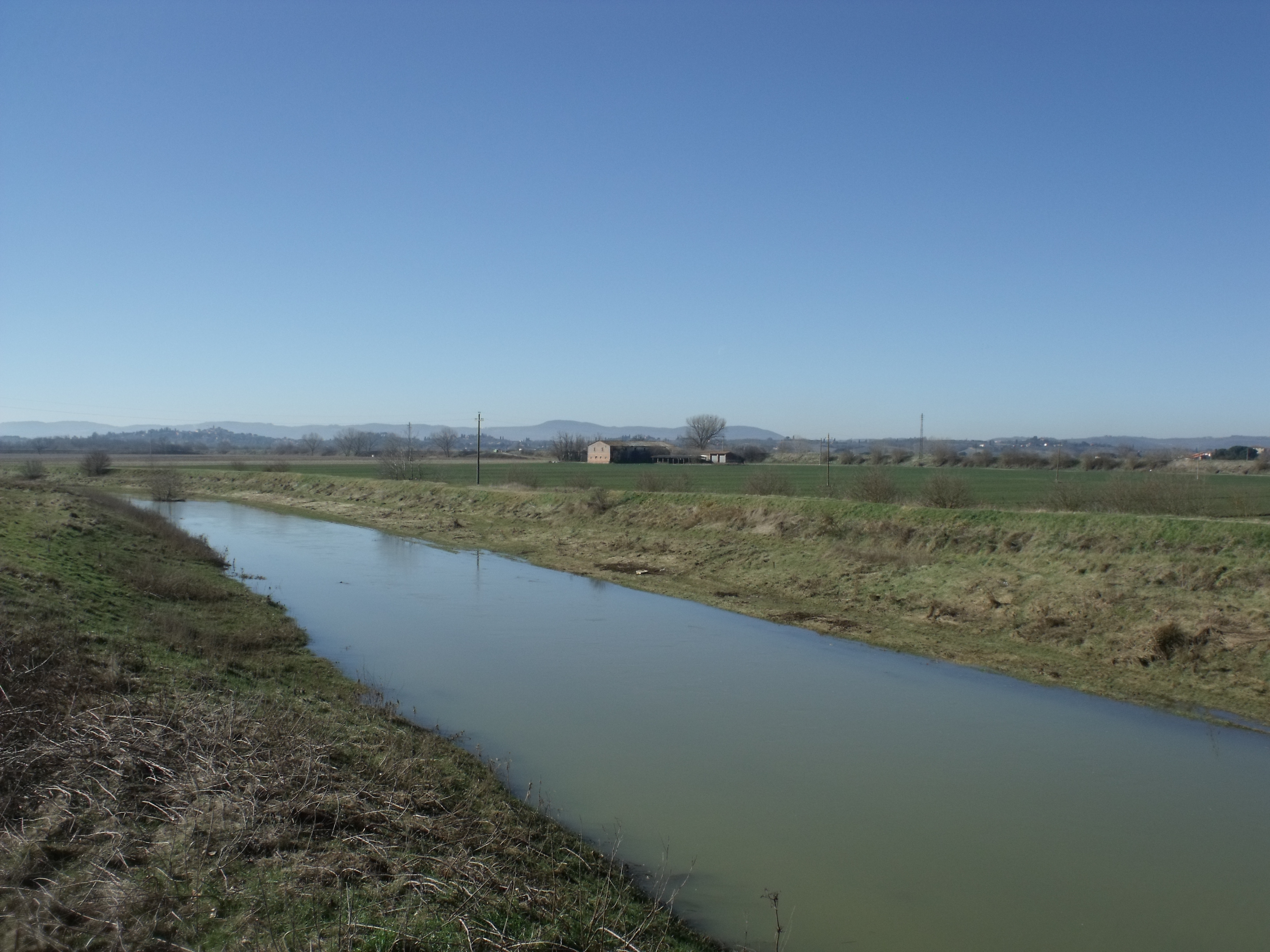

Location
- Country: Italy

Physical characteristics
- Mouth: Paglia
  - coordinates: 42.7280°N 12.1293°E

Basin features
- Progression: Paglia→ Tiber→ Tyrrhenian Sea

The Chiani (Latin: Clanis or Glanis, Ancient Greek: Κλάνις or Γλάνις) is a river in the Italian region of Tuscany. It is 42 km long. It begins in the Apennines of Arezzo, runs through the valley of Chiusi, and discharges into Paglia near Orvieto. Historically, it often caused substantial flooding in the valley of Clusium (Chiusi), which was felt even up to Rome. In the year 15 AD, it was suggested that it be part of the water in the Chiana Arnus (Arno). This project was abandoned because of opposition by the Florentines. Appian mentions that in 82 BC, a battle was fought between Sulla and Gnaeus Papirius Carbo, on the banks of the river, near Clusium, in which the former was victorious.

In the Middle Ages, the entire valley between Arezzo and Chiusi was an uninhabitable swamp, but towards the end of the 18th century, the engineer Conte Fossombroni addressed the issue, and moved the watershed by about 25 km further south, so that water from this valley now flows partly into the Arno and partly into the Tiber.
