= Monaldeschi =

Family

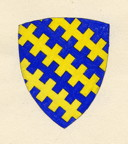
Coat of arms of Monaldeschi family

The House of Monaldeschi was one of the powerful noble families of Orvieto, central Italy, members of the Guelph party who contested with murders and violence the Ghibelline Filippeschi for control of the commune of Orvieto and the castelli of Umbria.

== History ==
According to the family's history, the Monaldeschi had descended from Monaldo, a ninth-century Lombard feudatory of Charlemagne, whose three brothers were the progenitors of Florentine and Sienese nobles, the Cavalcanti, the Calvi and the Malevolti. The Monaldeschi appear in Orvieto documents from 1157. Their conflict with the Filippeschi surfaced in 1212. At Castiglione the fortress of the Monaldeschi was built in the fourteenth century with the rubble of the Castle of Paterno destroyed by Gerardo di Corrado Monaldeschi. The central stronghold in the network of castelli that the Monaldeschi controlled was Torre Alfina, where tradition connected the central tower with Desiderius, the last king of the Lombards. Aside from a brief period 1314-16 when the Filippeschi seized it, Torre Alfina was the symbolic center of Montaldeschi power. The Monaldeschi towerhouse that rises above the rooftops of Civitella d'Agliano, overtopping the campanile of the church, still evokes the feudal power of the Monaldeschi at the limits of Umbria, on the banks of the Tiber; they were dislodged from Agliano by the Papacy in 1415, following the distracting Western Schism that had served to protract the Monaldeschi's medieval power.

One branch especially, the Monaldeschi della Cervara, dominated the life and politics of Orvieto, resisting Papal power from the thirteenth to the fifteenth century

The most famous of the family was Ermanno di Corrado of the Cervara branch, who between 1334 and his death in 1337 was the absolute Signore of Orvieto, where he suppressed civic liberties but demonstrated diplomatic and organizational finesse. At his death, however, the family's internecine quarrels broke the civic peace; the Monaldeschi ruptured along four lines each identified by their stemma or heraldic charge, the Monaldeschi della Cervara, Monaldeschi del Cane, Monaldeschi della Vipera and the Monaldeschi dell’Aquila. Angelo Monaldeschi della Vipera built the Castello della Sala on a rocky promontory about 18 km from Orvieto, not far from the border with Tuscany. His grandson, Gentile Monaldeschi della Sala, of the party of Francesco Sforza, made himself the Signor of Orvieto in 1437, in agreement with Pietro Ramponi, Ugolino da Montemarte, Ranuccio da Castel di Piero as well as others of the group called the Mercorini, who slaughtered the members of the opposing faction, the Muffati, who represented Papal power in Orvieto. More than sixty were killed and numerous houses were burnt. Gentile retained power for a decade, against the della Cervara branch. Later he fought the Venetian cardinal Pietro Barbo, who was to become Pope Paul II; in honourable defeat he was sent to Romania to lead the Pope's troops. Family contentions were calmed by the marriage in 1480 of Gentile's son, Pietro Antonio Monaldeschi della Vipera della Sala with his cousin Giovanna Monaldeschi della Cervara.

The Monaldeschi della Cervara had invested themselves with Bolsena, where they built the fortifications that are still a prominent feature. Temporary victories of one group over another resulted in the demolition of houses, towers, palazzi, to the detriment of city life. A communal decree of 24 September 1347, in an attempt to put an end to such destruction, granted to the Monaldeschi the territory of Orvieto as far as Montalto di Castro, Orbetello, and the Isola del Giglio, but strife continued. In June 1351 the Monaldeschi della Cervara captured an unfortunate follower of the della Vipera and killed him so brutally in the cellars of the castello of Torre Alfina that the morsels of his body were fed to falcons. Reciprocal violence continued through the century. In 1406 the acquesiani took Monte Rufeno and San Pietro Aquaeortus, burned Marzapalo and damaged Trevinano. In 1442 Alvisi Monaldeschi della Cervara, in order to regain his Torre Alfina from the condottiere Ciarpellone, under the direction of Francesco Sforza was forced to pay a thousand gold ducats. In 1527, at the time of the Sack of Rome, Camillo Monaldeschi joined the army of Charles V and participated in the pillaging of Proceno, San Lorenzo and Grotte di Castro. Acquapendente was successfully defended but local animosities fueled destruction in the region of Orvieto. Camillo Monaldeschi brought a well-armed band from Trevinano to defend Torre Alfina.

In 1592 Gianfrancesco Monaldeschi was found guilty of harbouring brigands and rebels against Papal power, and Pope Clement VIII confiscated in favour of the Papal treasury, half of the Monaldeschi holdings in Trevinano, selling three-quarters of the remainder to Giacomo Cardinal Simoncelli, bishop of Orvieto, 26 June 1598. With the cession to the Papal States of Torre Alfina in 1664, the Monaldeschi ceased to play a part in the politics of Central Italy, though the marchese Gian Rinaldo Monaldeschi was reputed to be the lover of Christina of Sweden in her Roman retirement. When she discovered that Monaldeschi had betrayed her plans to take the Kingdom of Naples to the Pope, she had him assassinated 10 November 1657, in her presence at Fontainebleau, where the queen was staying in her passage through France.

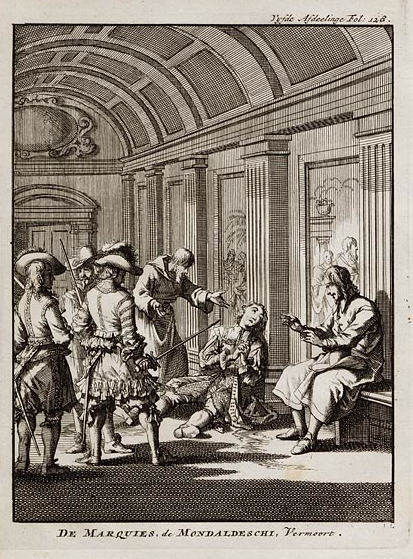
The death of the marquis of Monaldeschi ordered by Queen Christina
