= List of municipalities of Umbria =

Location of Umbria within Italy

Provinces of Umbria

The following is a list of the municipalities (comuni) of the region of Umbria in Italy.

There are 92 municipalities in Umbria as of 2026:

- 59 in the Province of Perugia
- 33 in the Province of Terni

== List ==
Municipality	Province	Population (2026)	Area (km²)	Density
Acquasparta	Terni	4,330	81.61	53.1
Allerona	Terni	1,679	82.61	20.3
Alviano	Terni	1,318	23.90	55.1
Amelia	Terni	11,404	132.50	86.1
Arrone	Terni	2,504	41.04	61.0
Assisi	Perugia	27,400	187.19	146.4
Attigliano	Terni	1,962	10.51	186.7
Avigliano Umbro	Terni	2,308	51.34	45.0
Baschi	Terni	2,544	68.57	37.1
Bastia Umbra	Perugia	21,497	27.60	778.9
Bettona	Perugia	4,247	45.08	94.2
Bevagna	Perugia	4,736	56.22	84.2
Calvi dell'Umbria	Terni	1,660	45.79	36.3
Campello sul Clitunno	Perugia	2,311	49.76	46.4
Cannara	Perugia	4,169	32.81	127.1
Cascia	Perugia	2,930	180.85	16.2
Castel Giorgio	Terni	1,992	42.14	47.3
Castel Ritaldi	Perugia	2,994	22.44	133.4
Castel Viscardo	Terni	2,640	26.22	100.7
Castiglione del Lago	Perugia	15,202	205.26	74.1
Cerreto di Spoleto	Perugia	961	74.78	12.9
Citerna	Perugia	3,383	23.53	143.8
Città della Pieve	Perugia	7,377	110.94	66.5
Città di Castello	Perugia	37,847	387.32	97.7
Collazzone	Perugia	3,284	55.68	59.0
Corciano	Perugia	21,603	63.72	339.0
Costacciaro	Perugia	1,020	41.06	24.8
Deruta	Perugia	9,562	44.51	214.8
Fabro	Terni	2,570	34.55	74.4
Ferentillo	Terni	1,767	69.59	25.4
Ficulle	Terni	1,548	64.62	24.0
Foligno	Perugia	55,262	264.67	208.8
Fossato di Vico	Perugia	2,585	35.39	73.0
Fratta Todina	Perugia	1,913	17.43	109.8
Giano dell'Umbria	Perugia	3,669	44.48	82.5
Giove	Terni	1,829	15.09	121.2
Gualdo Cattaneo	Perugia	5,628	96.63	58.2
Gualdo Tadino	Perugia	14,133	124.29	113.7
Guardea	Terni	1,714	39.38	43.5
Gubbio	Perugia	30,190	525.78	57.4
Lisciano Niccone	Perugia	602	35.18	17.1
Lugnano in Teverina	Terni	1,390	29.83	46.6
Magione	Perugia	14,662	129.73	113.0
Marsciano	Perugia	17,962	161.49	111.2
Massa Martana	Perugia	3,553	78.41	45.3
Monte Castello di Vibio	Perugia	1,378	31.95	43.1
Monte Santa Maria Tiberina	Perugia	1,045	72.53	14.4
Montecastrilli	Terni	4,787	62.43	76.7
Montecchio	Terni	1,427	49.22	29.0
Montefalco	Perugia	5,266	69.51	75.8
Montefranco	Terni	1,243	10.09	123.2
Montegabbione	Terni	1,095	51.06	21.4
Monteleone d'Orvieto	Terni	1,357	24.10	56.3
Monteleone di Spoleto	Perugia	535	62.18	8.6
Montone	Perugia	1,534	51.10	30.0
Narni	Terni	17,626	197.99	89.0
Nocera Umbra	Perugia	5,474	157.17	34.8
Norcia	Perugia	4,399	275.58	16.0
Orvieto	Terni	19,052	281.27	67.7
Otricoli	Terni	1,717	27.53	62.4
Paciano	Perugia	923	16.91	54.6
Panicale	Perugia	5,317	79.26	67.1
Parrano	Terni	492	40.09	12.3
Passignano sul Trasimeno	Perugia	5,686	81.33	69.9
Penna in Teverina	Terni	1,024	10.00	102.4
Perugia	Perugia	162,384	449.51	361.2
Piegaro	Perugia	3,321	99.18	33.5
Pietralunga	Perugia	2,010	140.42	14.3
Poggiodomo	Perugia	81	40.09	2.0
Polino	Terni	233	19.57	11.9
Porano	Terni	1,816	13.60	133.5
Preci	Perugia	678	82.03	8.3
San Gemini	Terni	4,611	27.90	165.3
San Giustino	Perugia	11,020	79.98	137.8
San Venanzo	Terni	2,122	169.45	12.5
Sant'Anatolia di Narco	Perugia	490	46.55	10.5
Scheggia e Pascelupo	Perugia	1,231	64.16	19.2
Scheggino	Perugia	422	35.85	11.8
Sellano	Perugia	918	85.85	10.7
Sigillo	Perugia	2,282	26.48	86.2
Spello	Perugia	8,208	61.65	133.1
Spoleto	Perugia	35,875	348.14	103.0
Stroncone	Terni	4,606	71.17	64.7
Terni	Terni	106,272	212.43	500.3
Todi	Perugia	15,432	222.86	69.2
Torgiano	Perugia	6,628	37.66	176.0
Trevi	Perugia	7,969	71.19	111.9
Tuoro sul Trasimeno	Perugia	3,793	55.89	67.9
Umbertide	Perugia	16,207	200.83	80.7
Valfabbrica	Perugia	3,225	92.30	34.9
Vallo di Nera	Perugia	317	36.22	8.8
Valtopina	Perugia	1,258	40.57	31.0

== Gallery ==
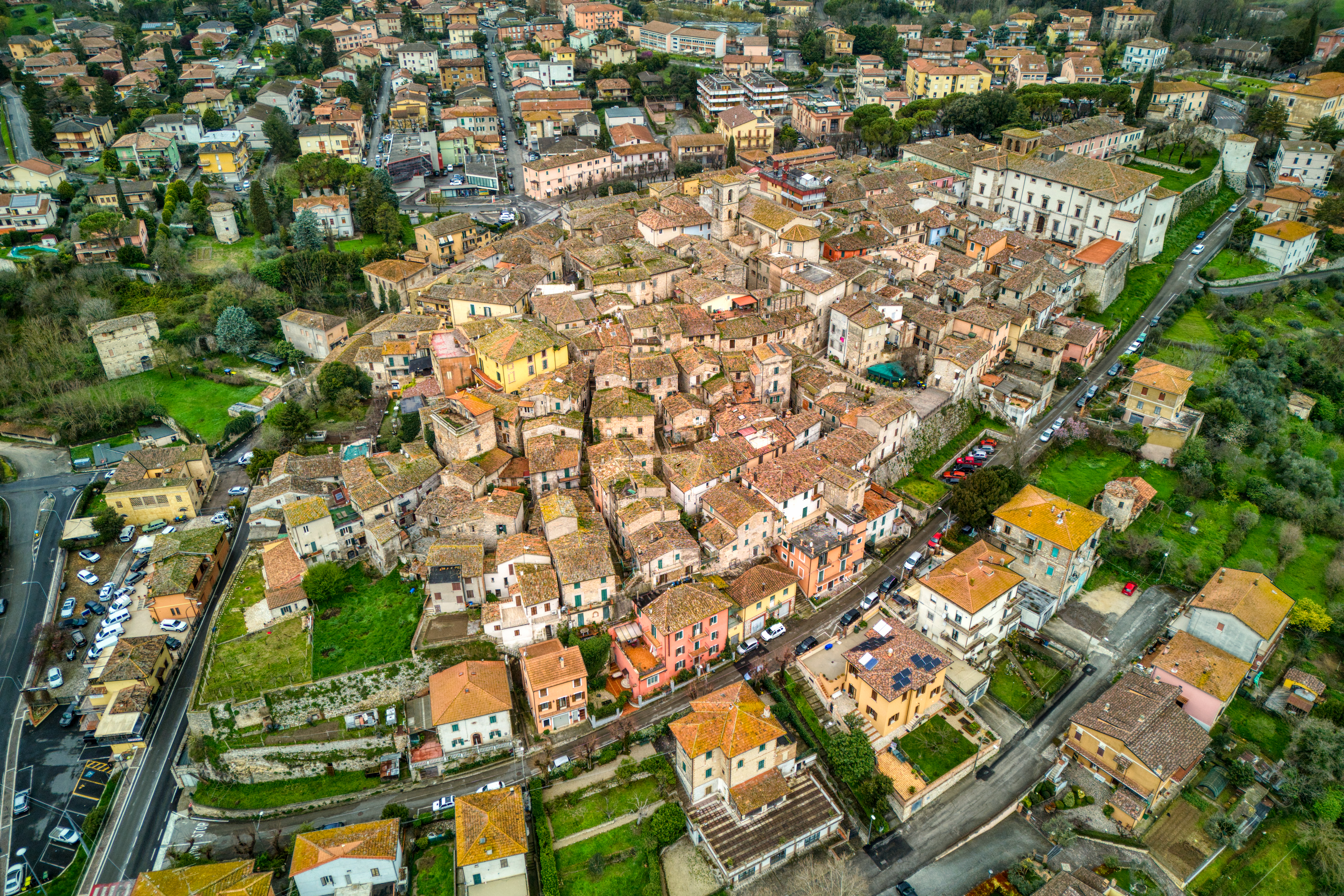
Acquasparta

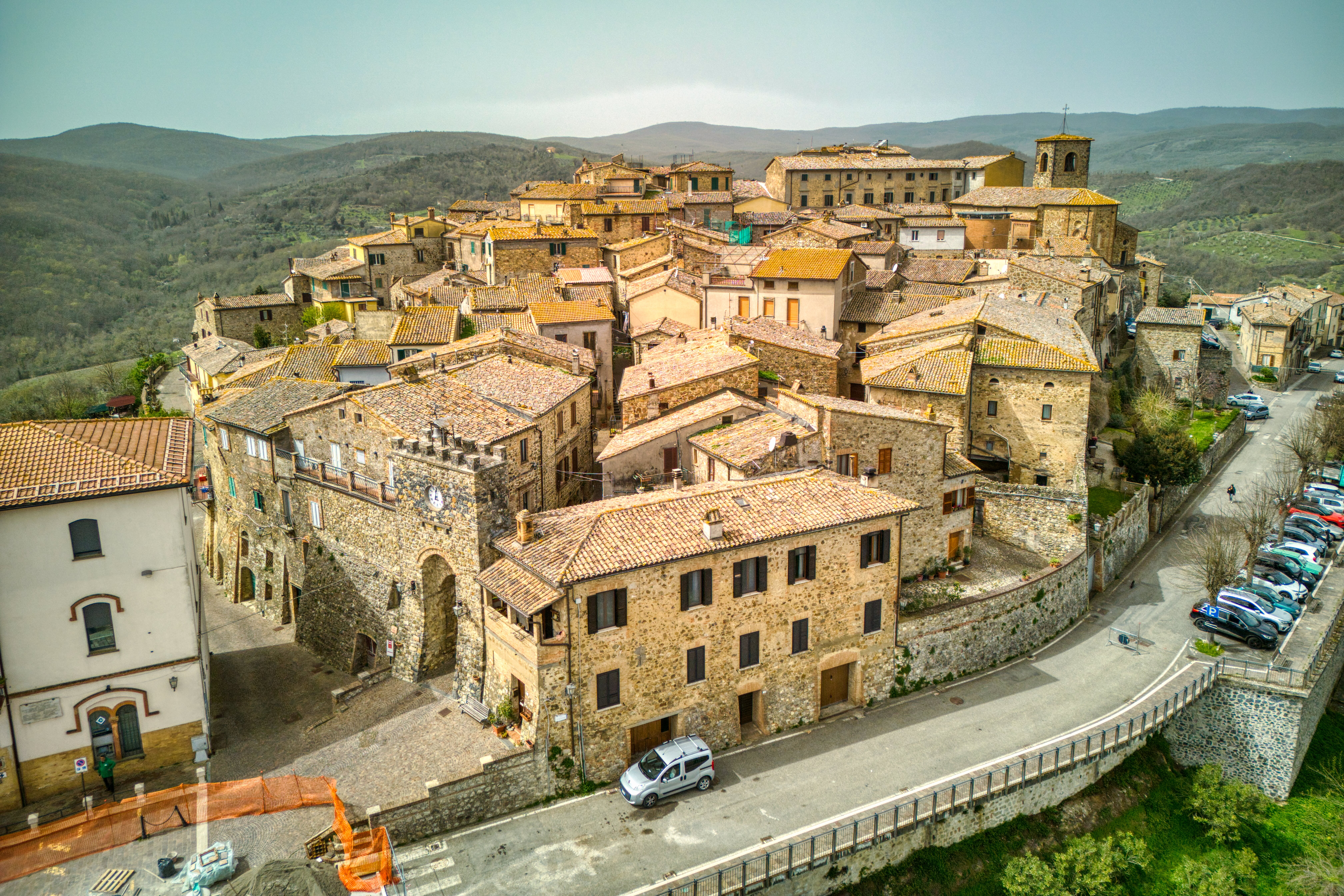
Allerona

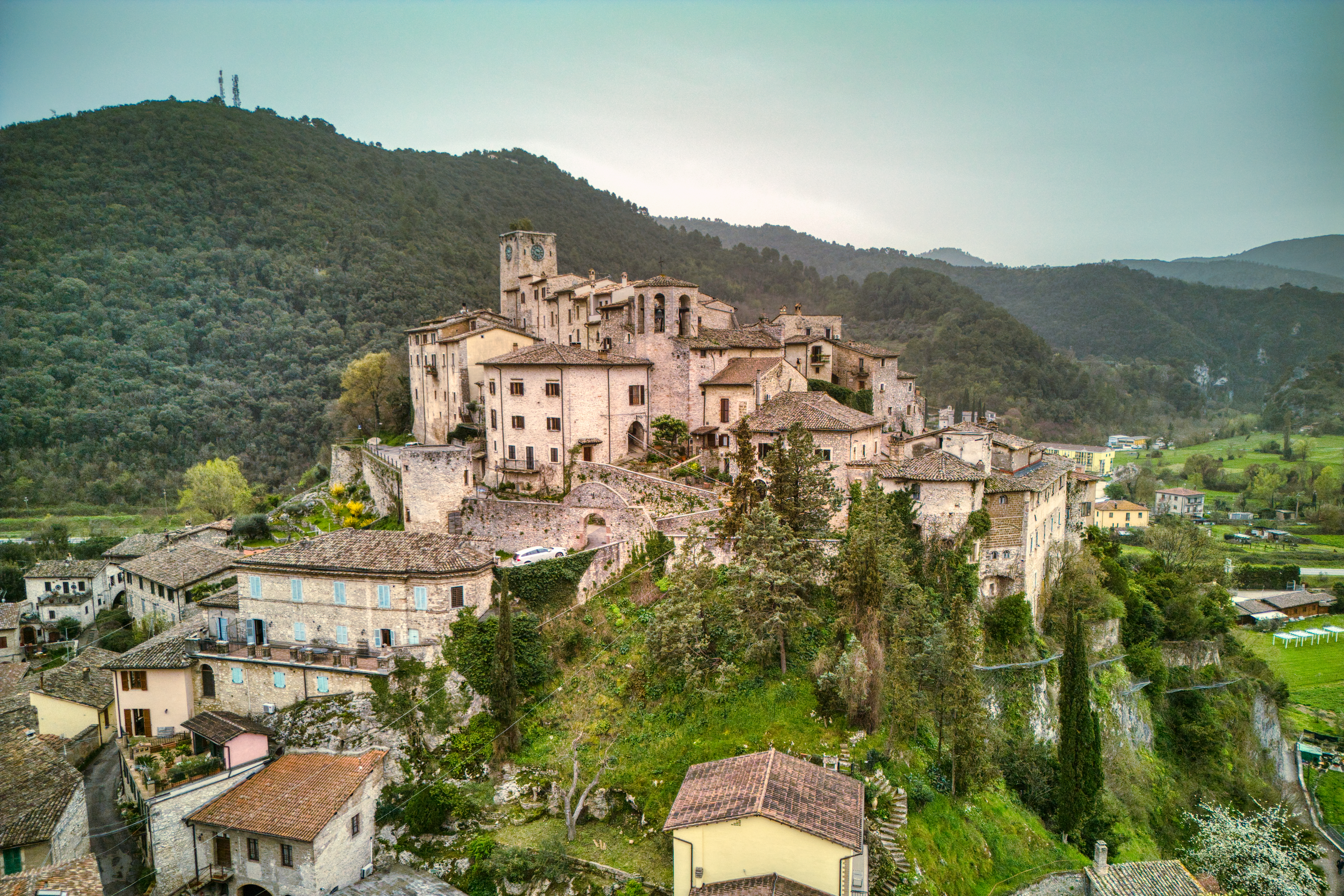
Arrone

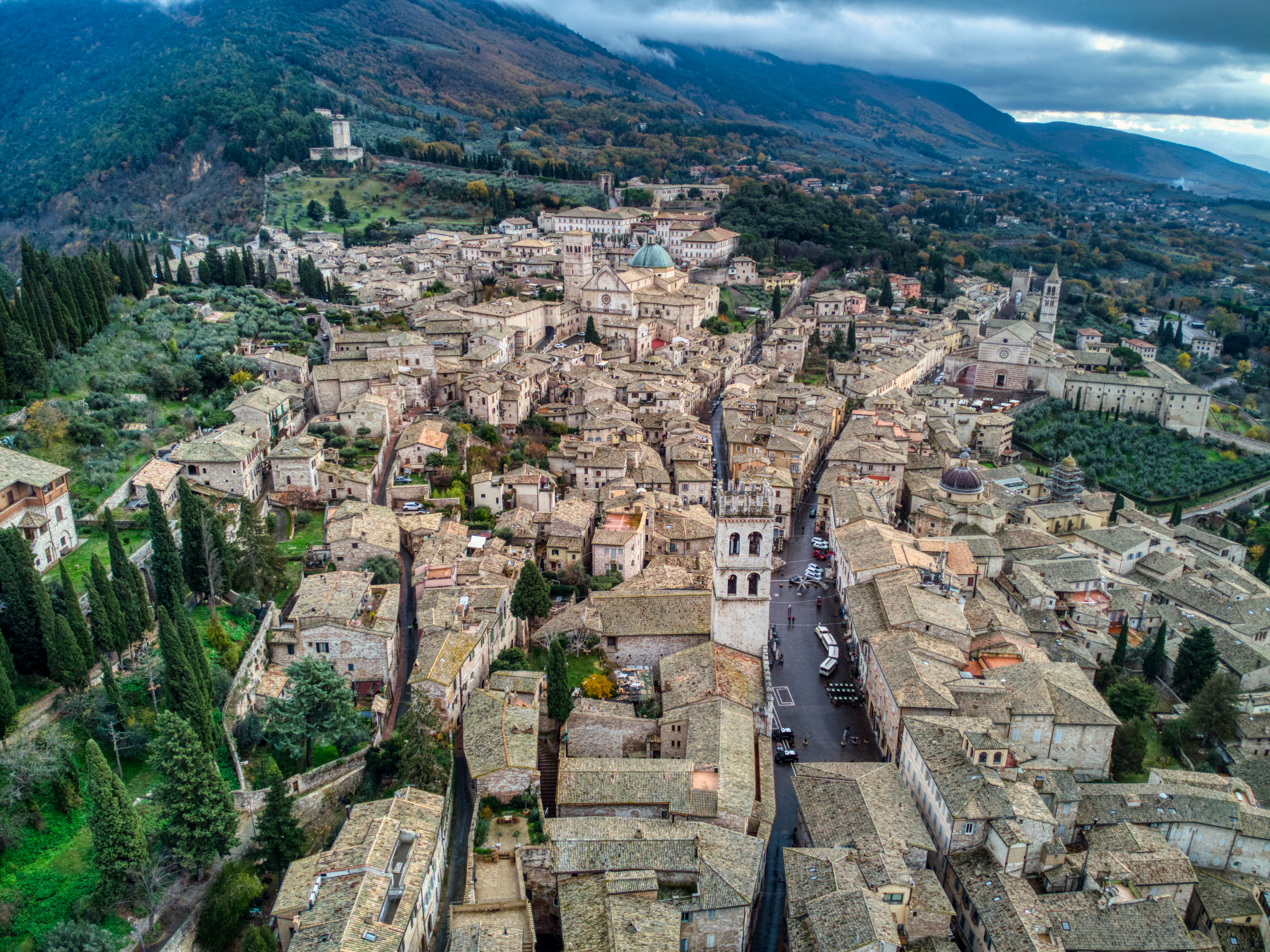
Assisi

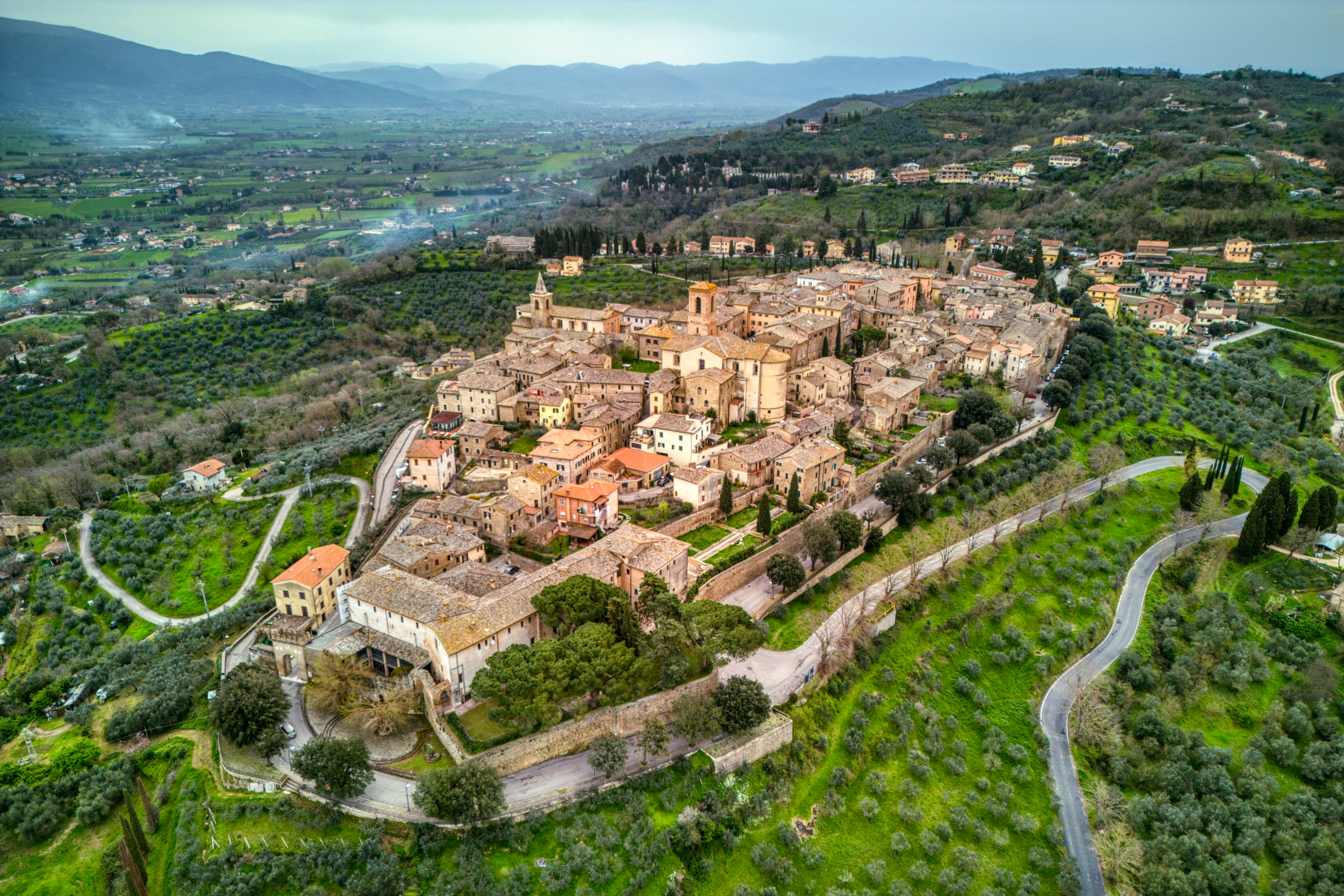
Bettona

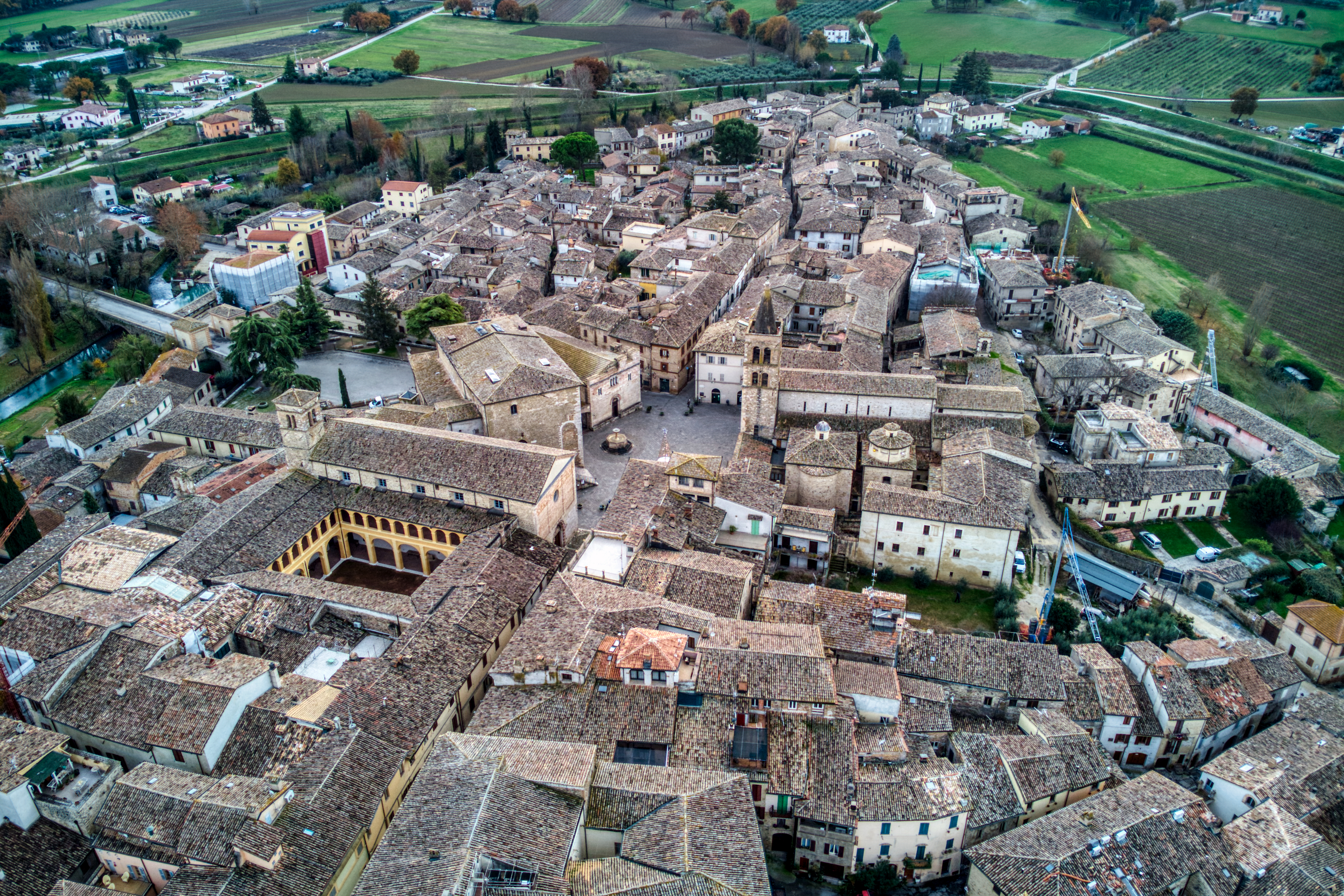
Bevagna

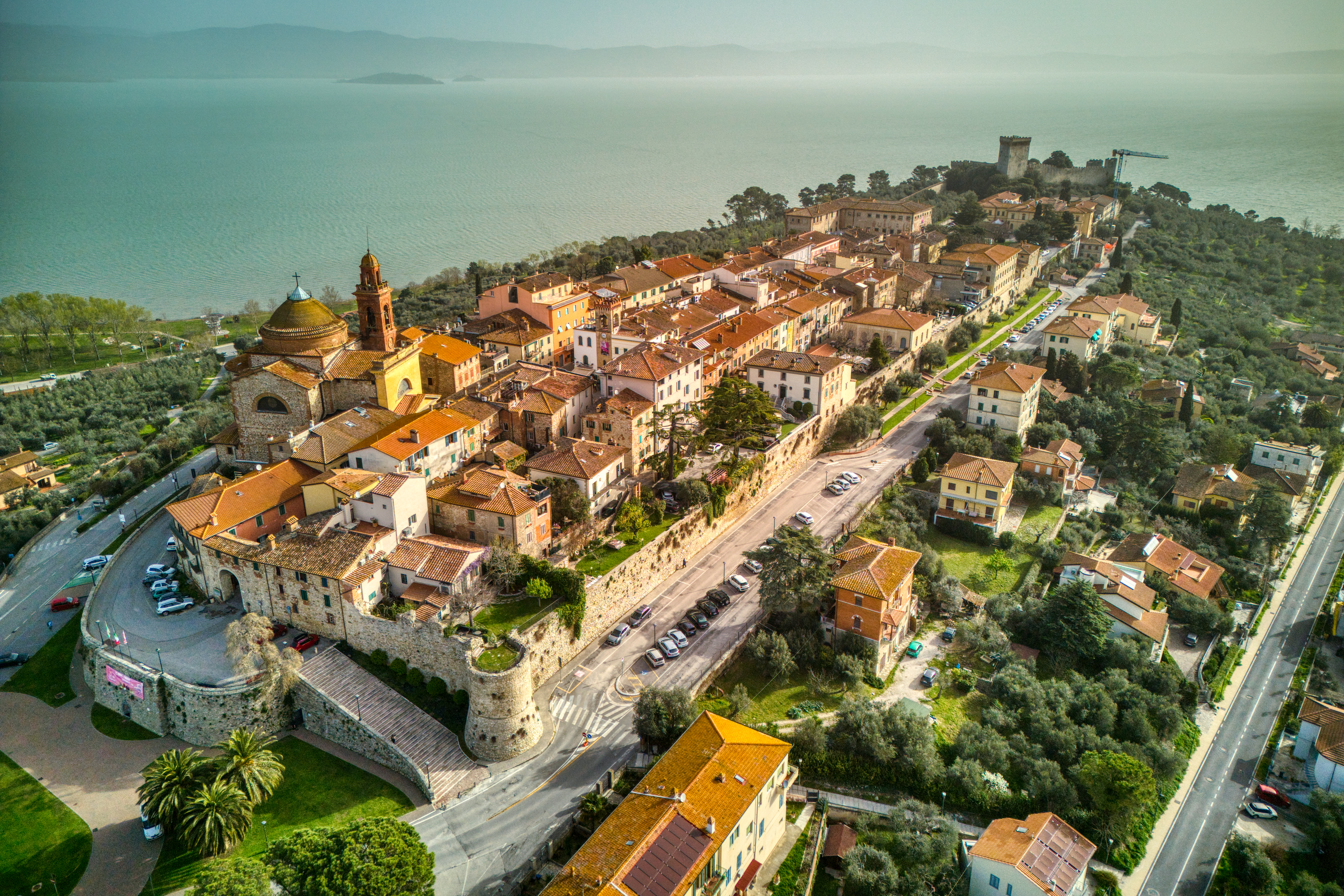
Castiglione del Lago

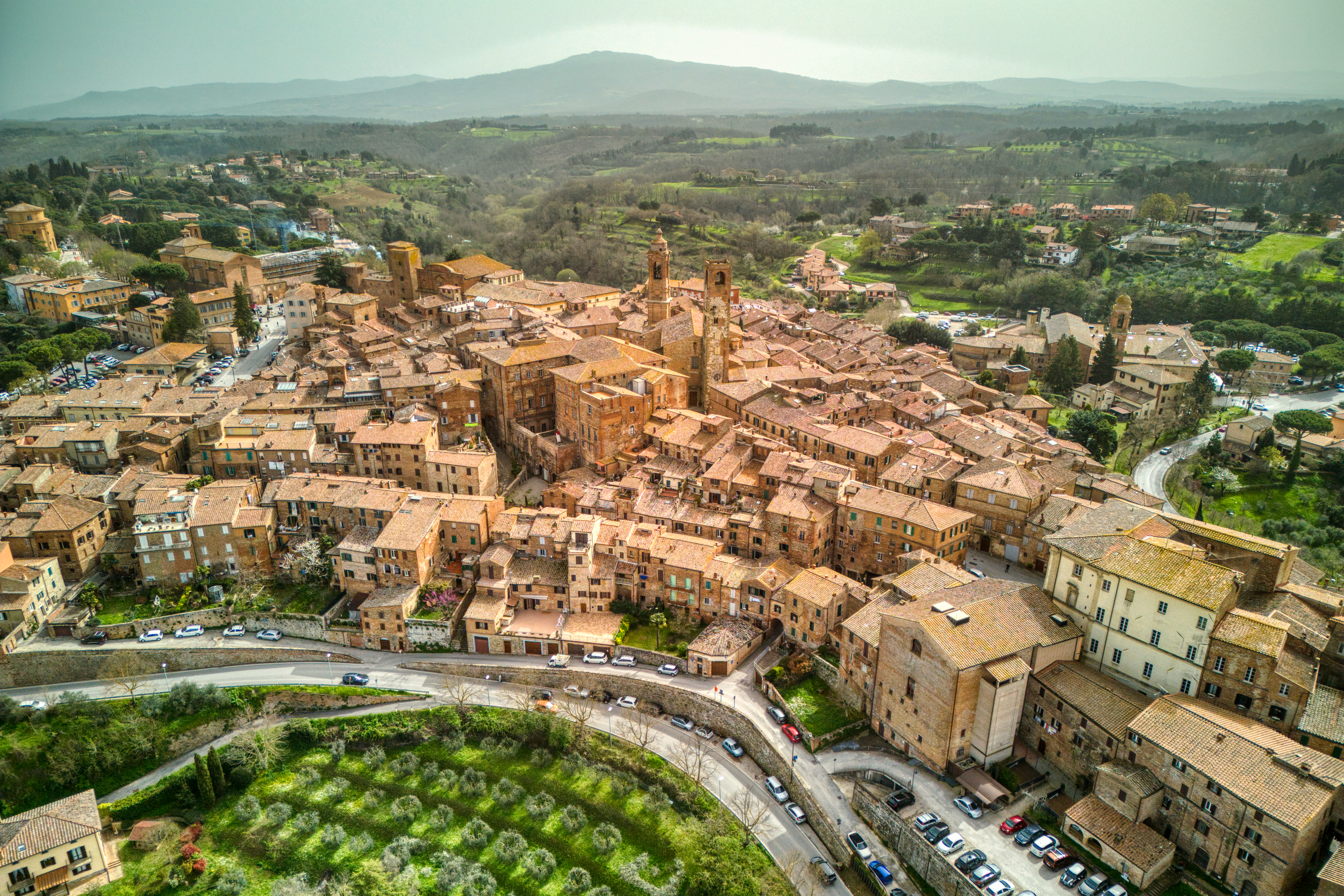
Città della Pieve

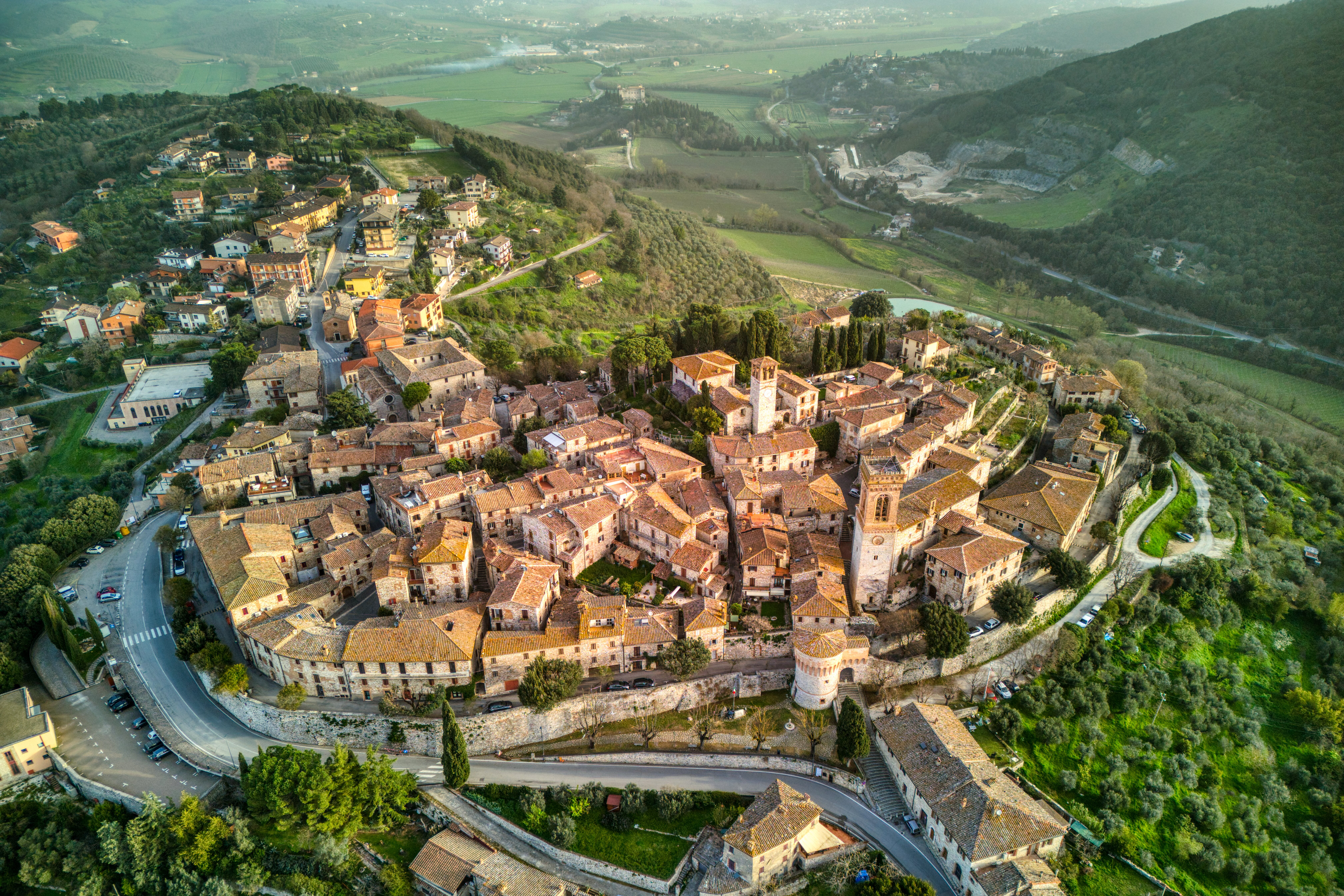
Corciano

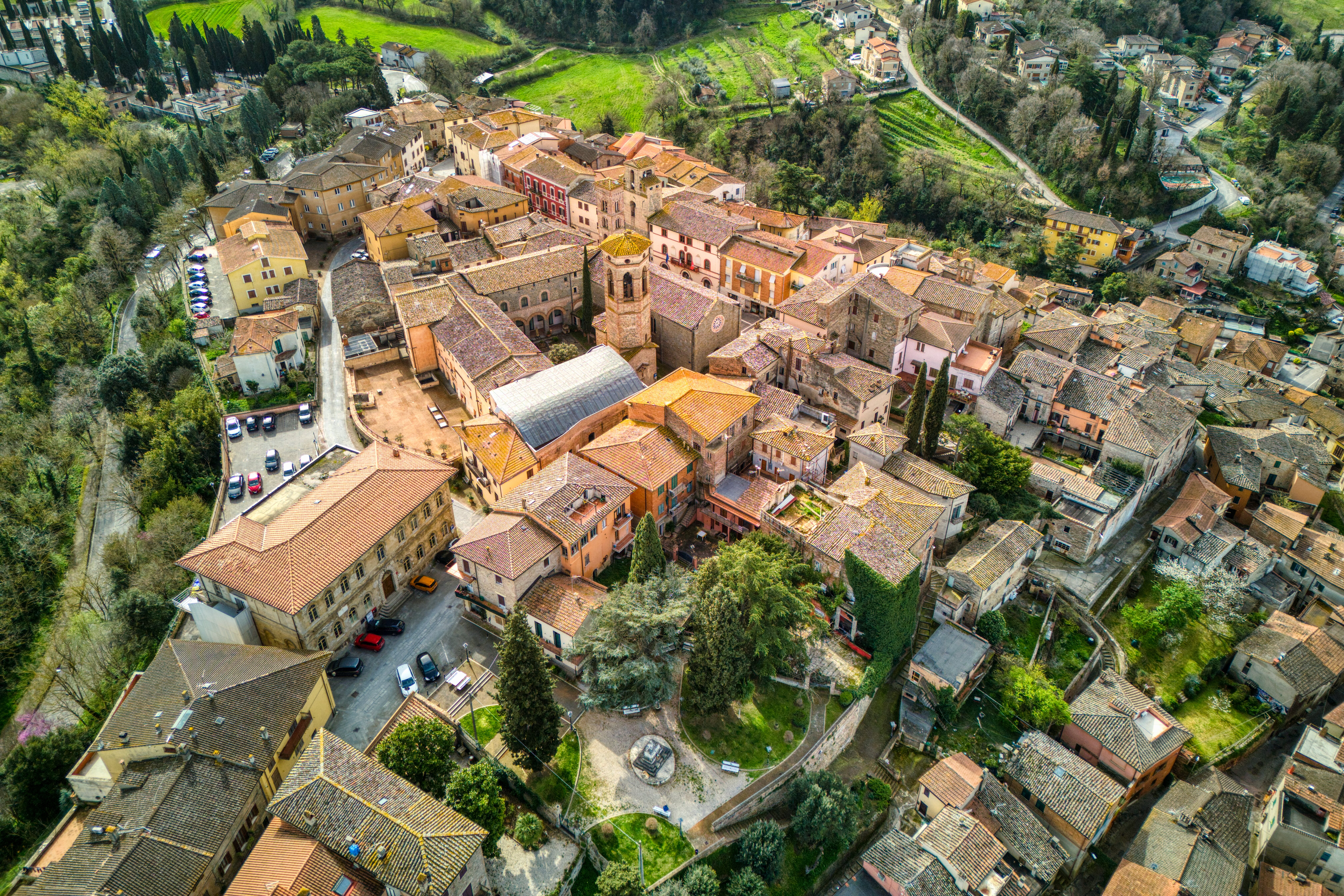
Deruta

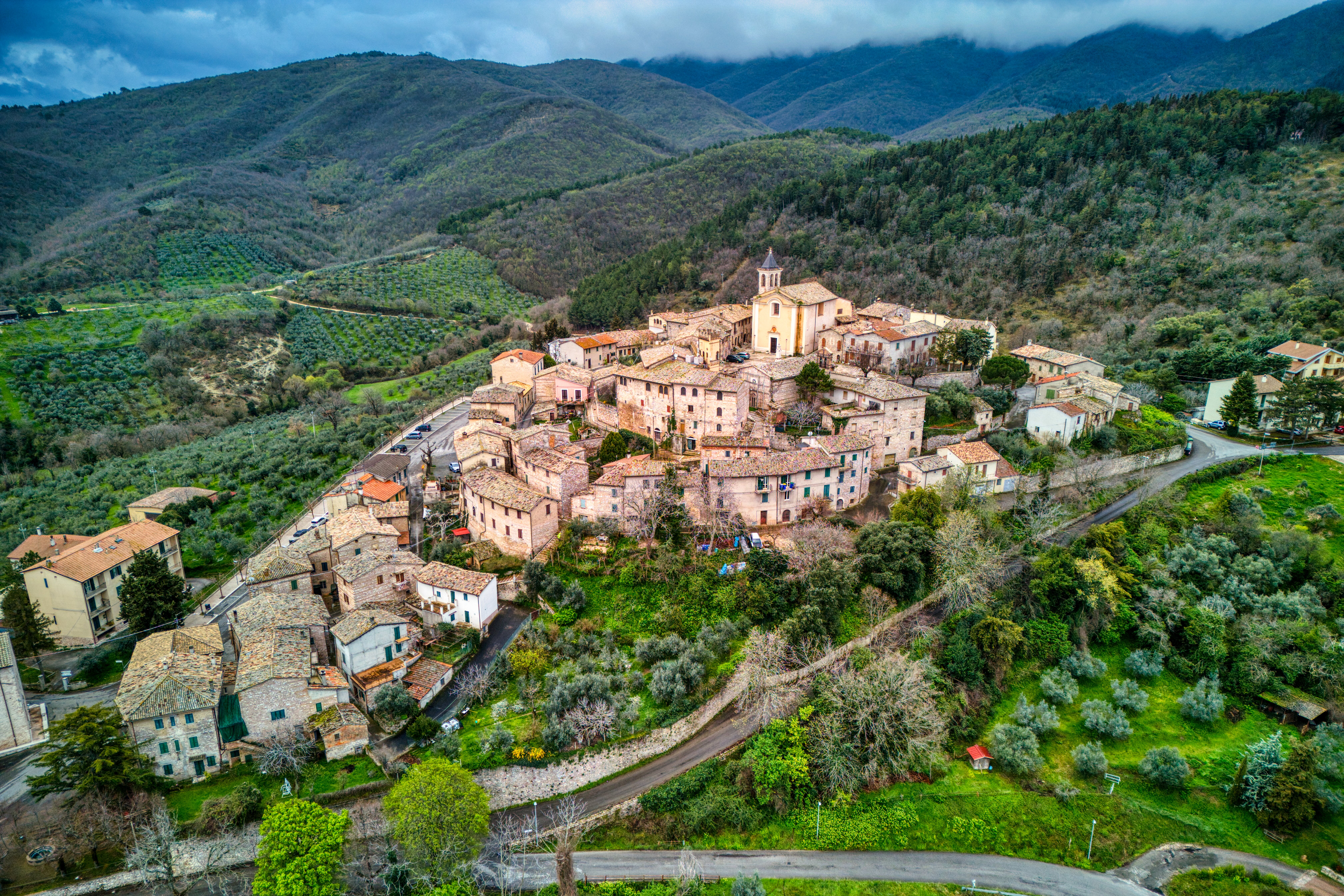
Giano dell'Umbria

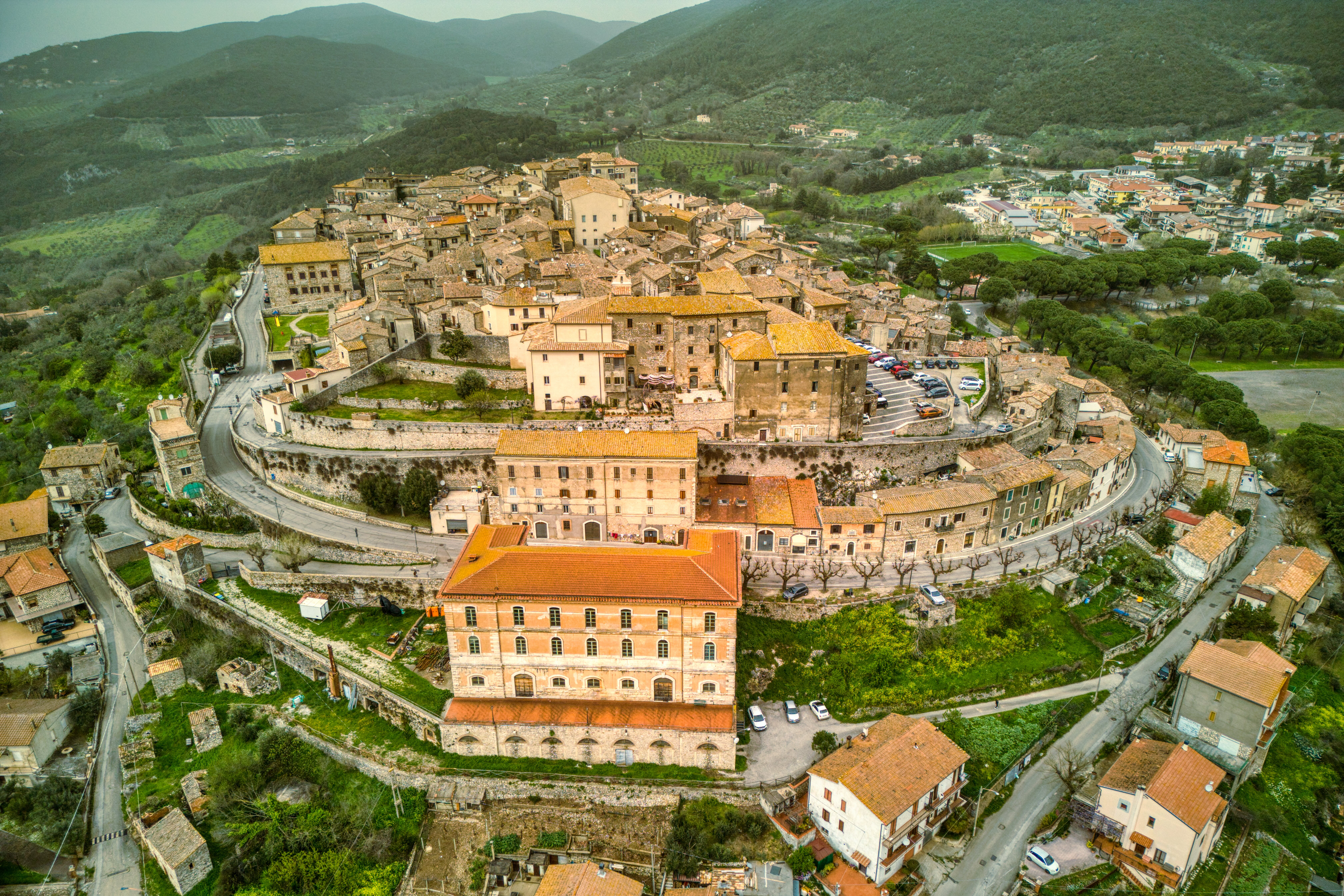
Lugnano in Teverina

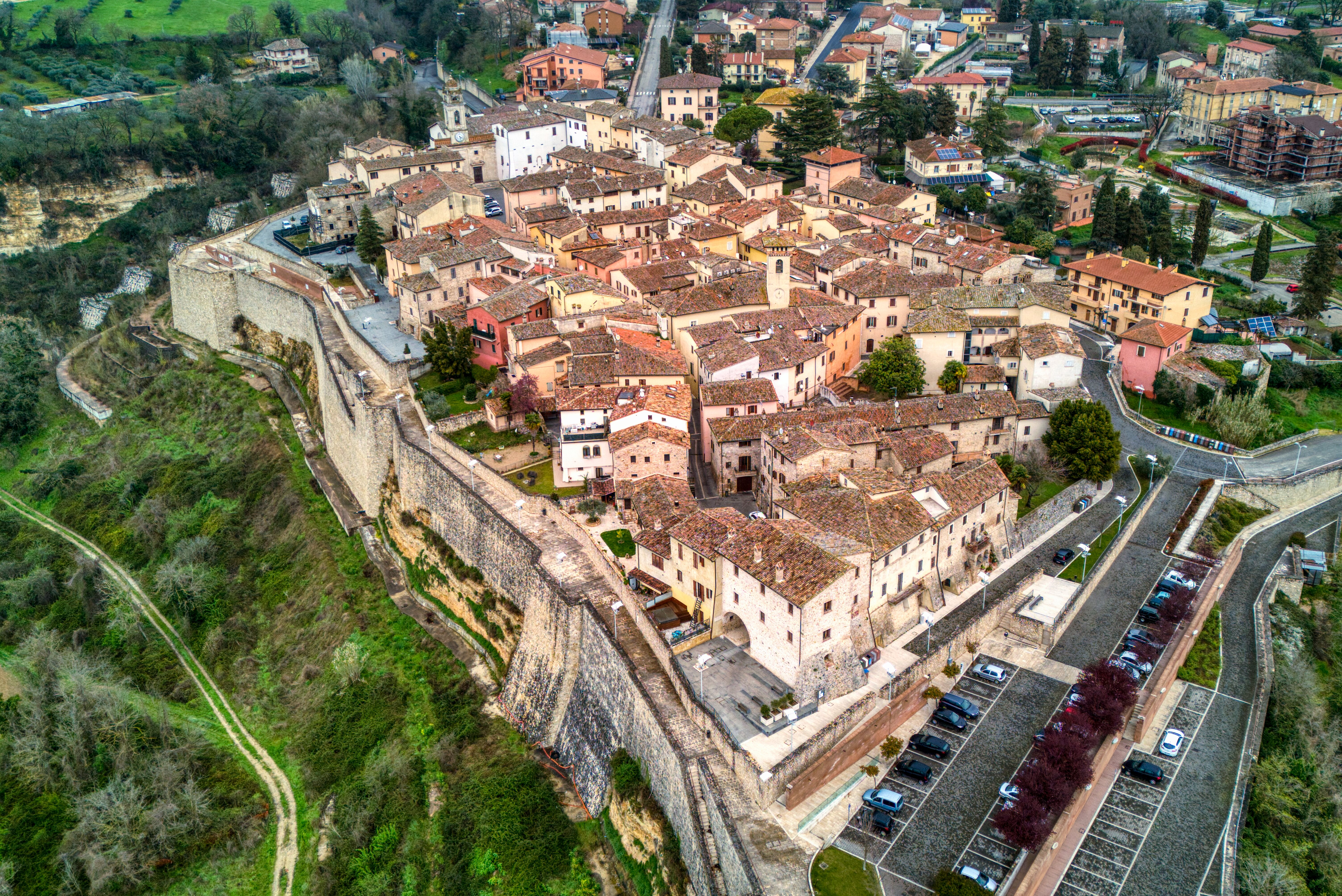
Massa Martana

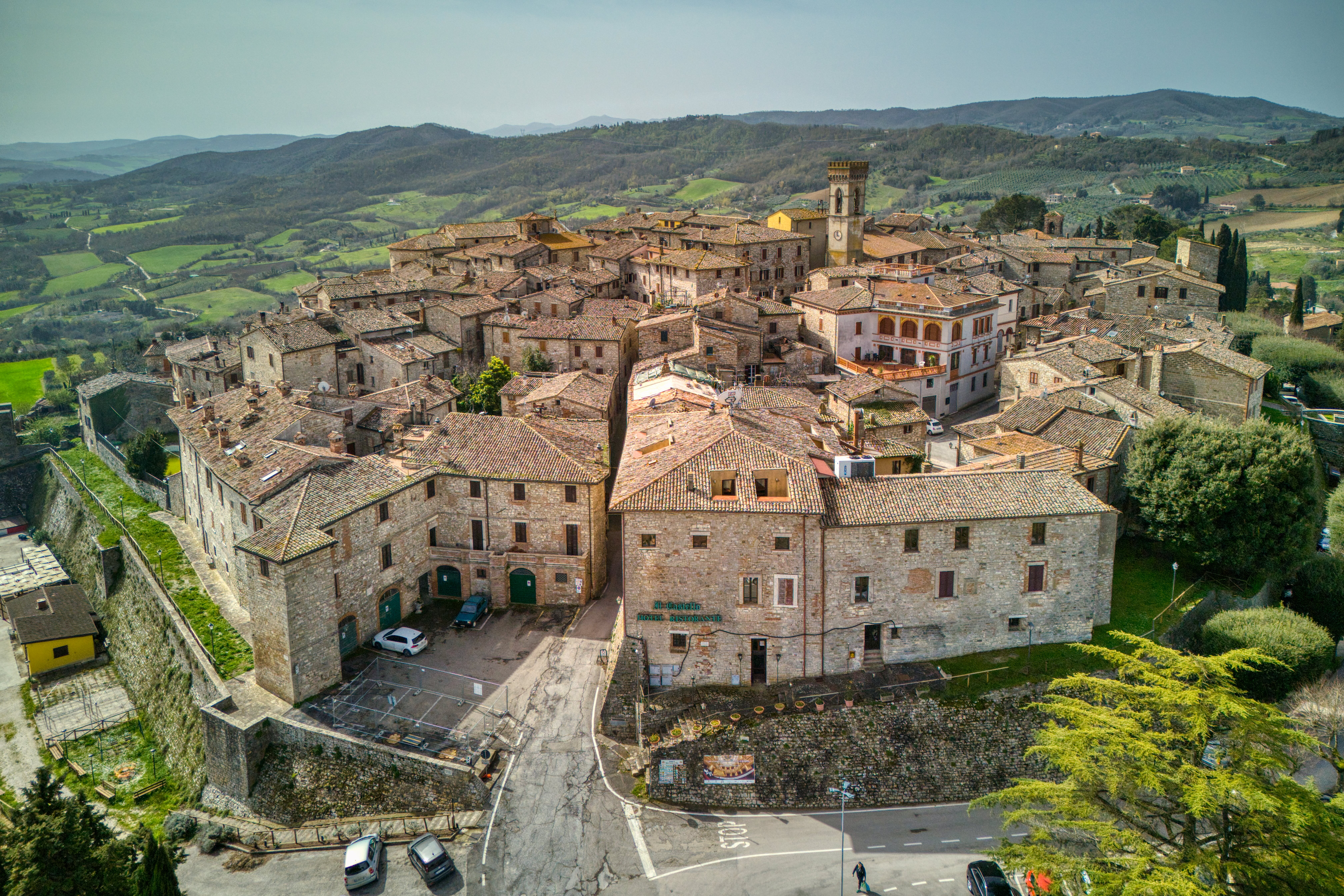
Monte Castello di Vibio

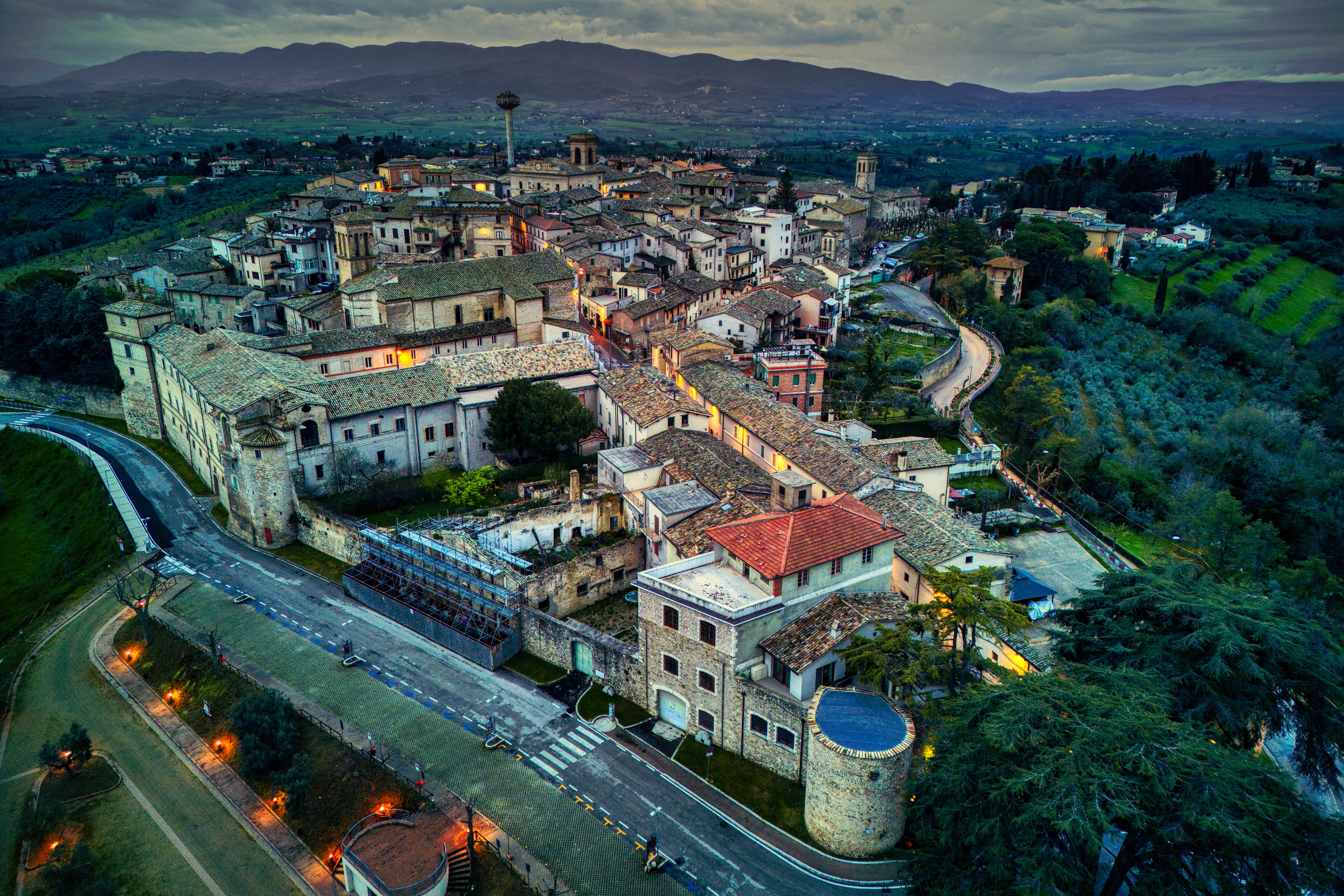
Montefalco

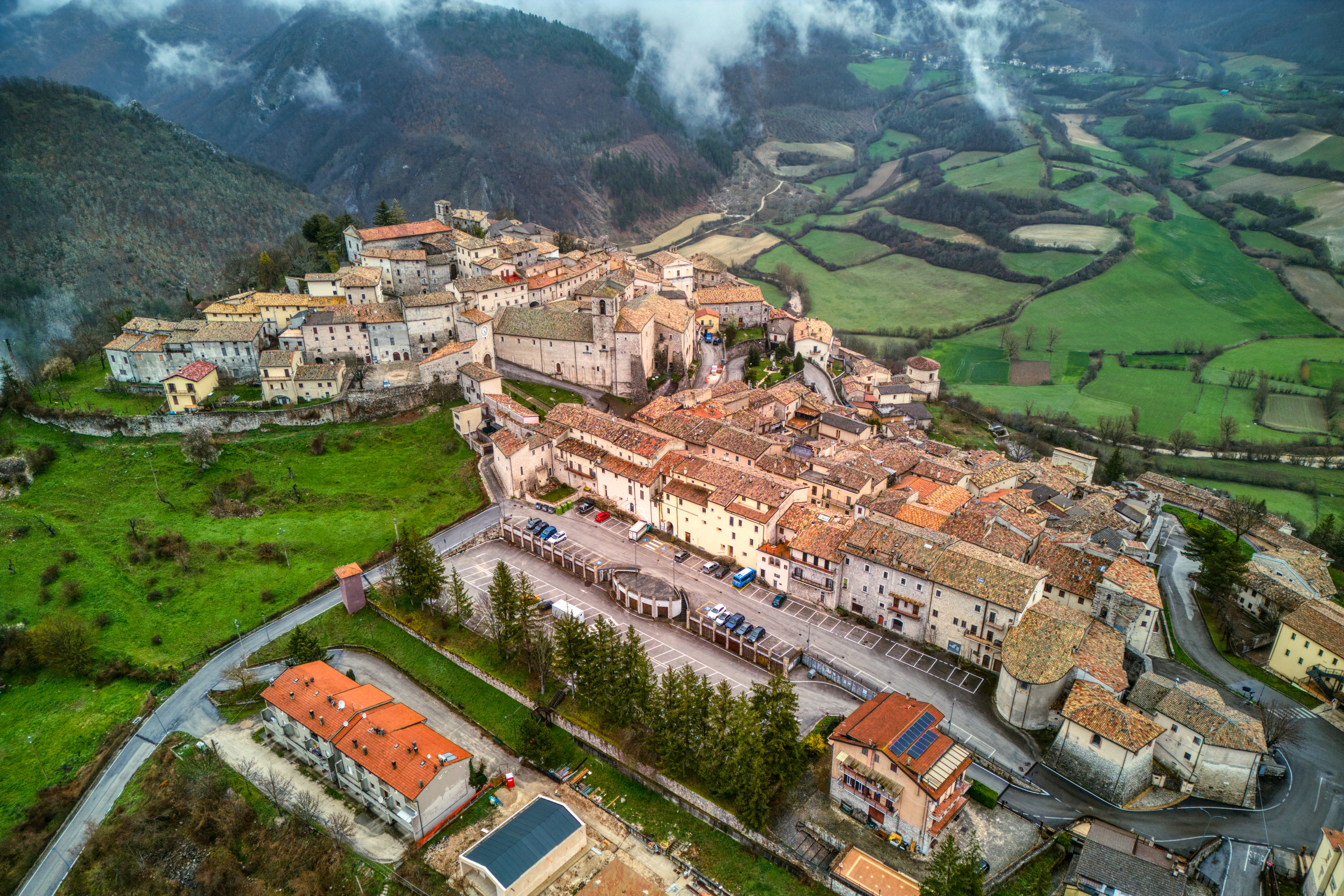
Monteleone di Spoleto

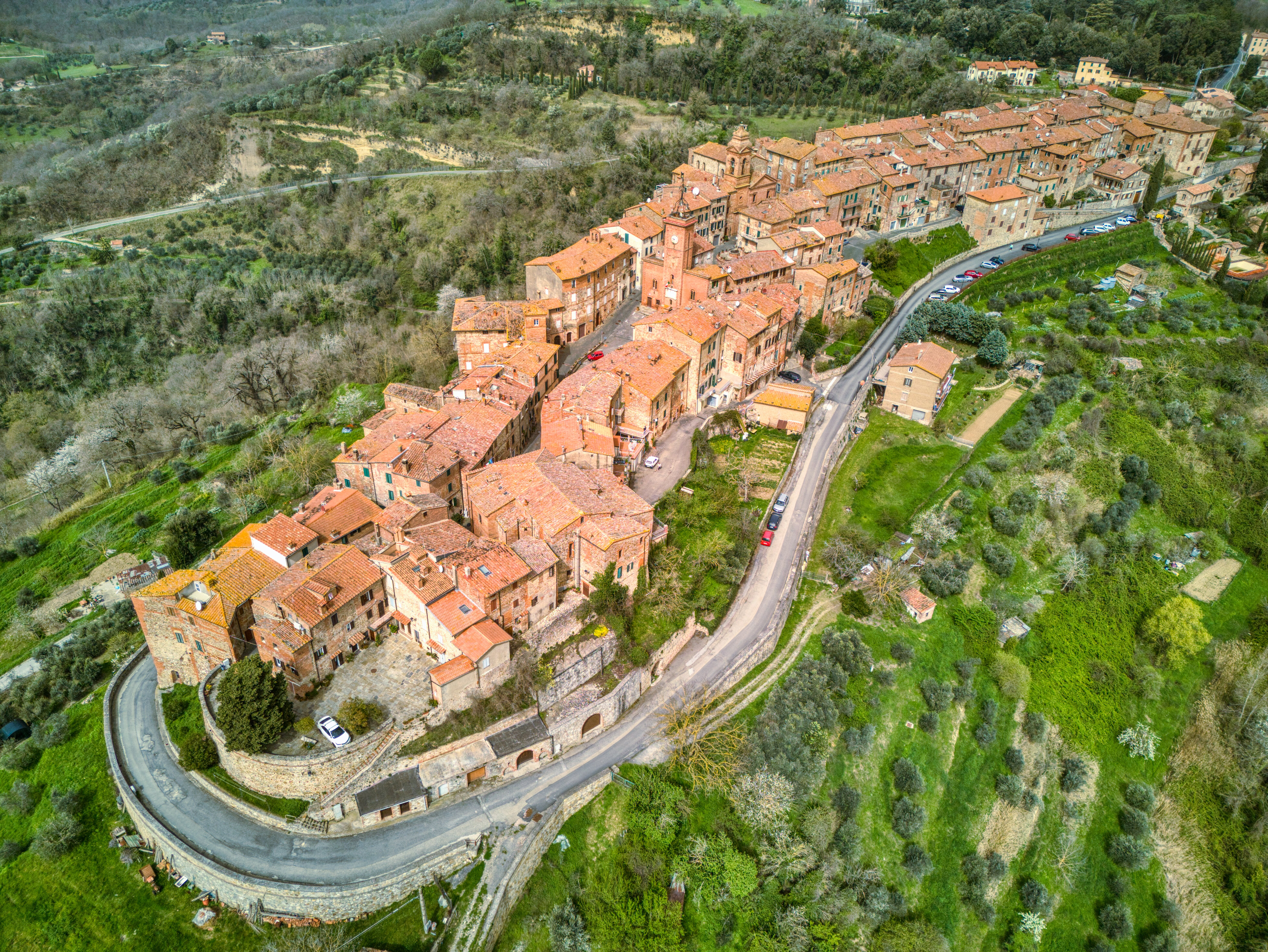
Monteleone d'Orvieto

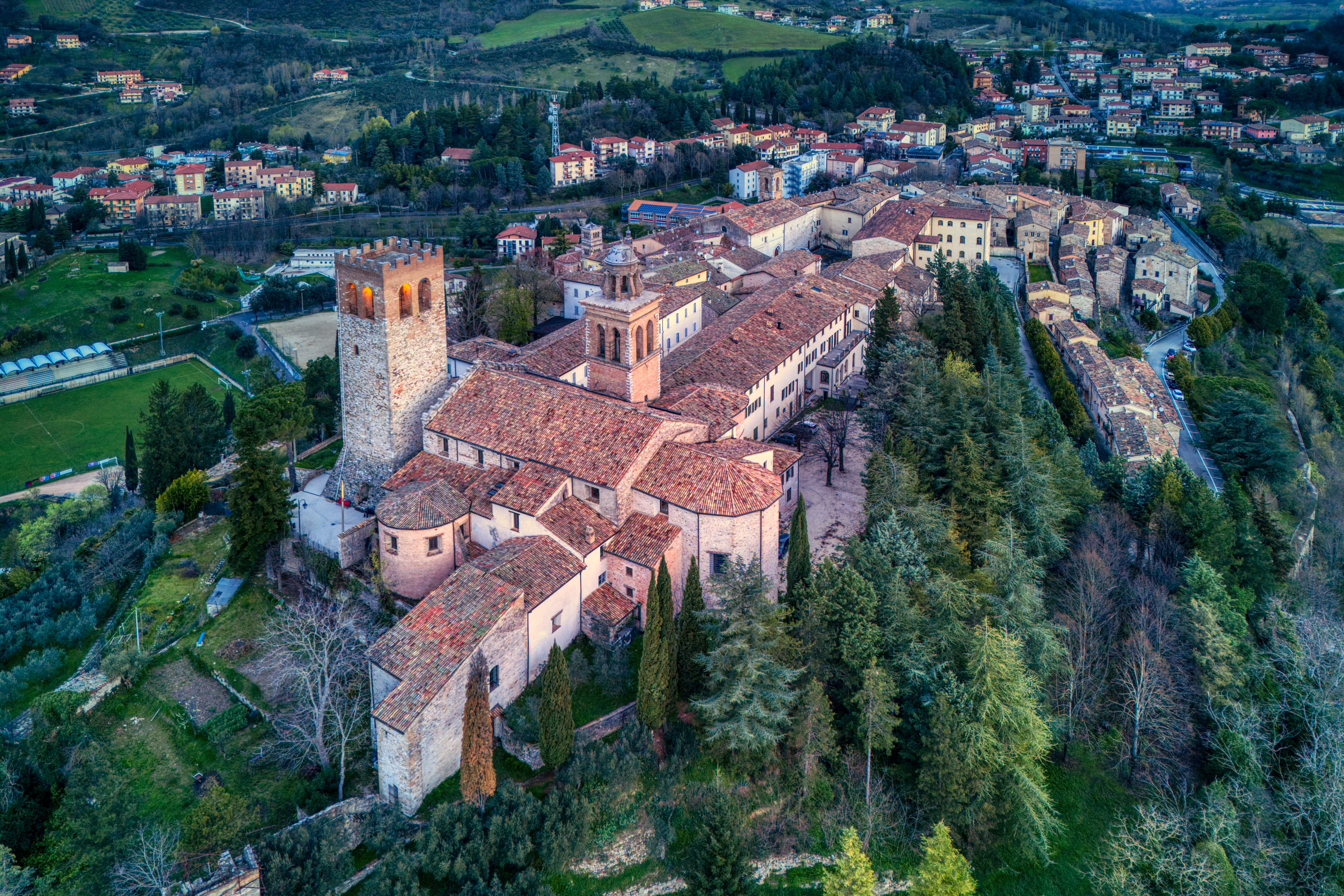
Nocera Umbra

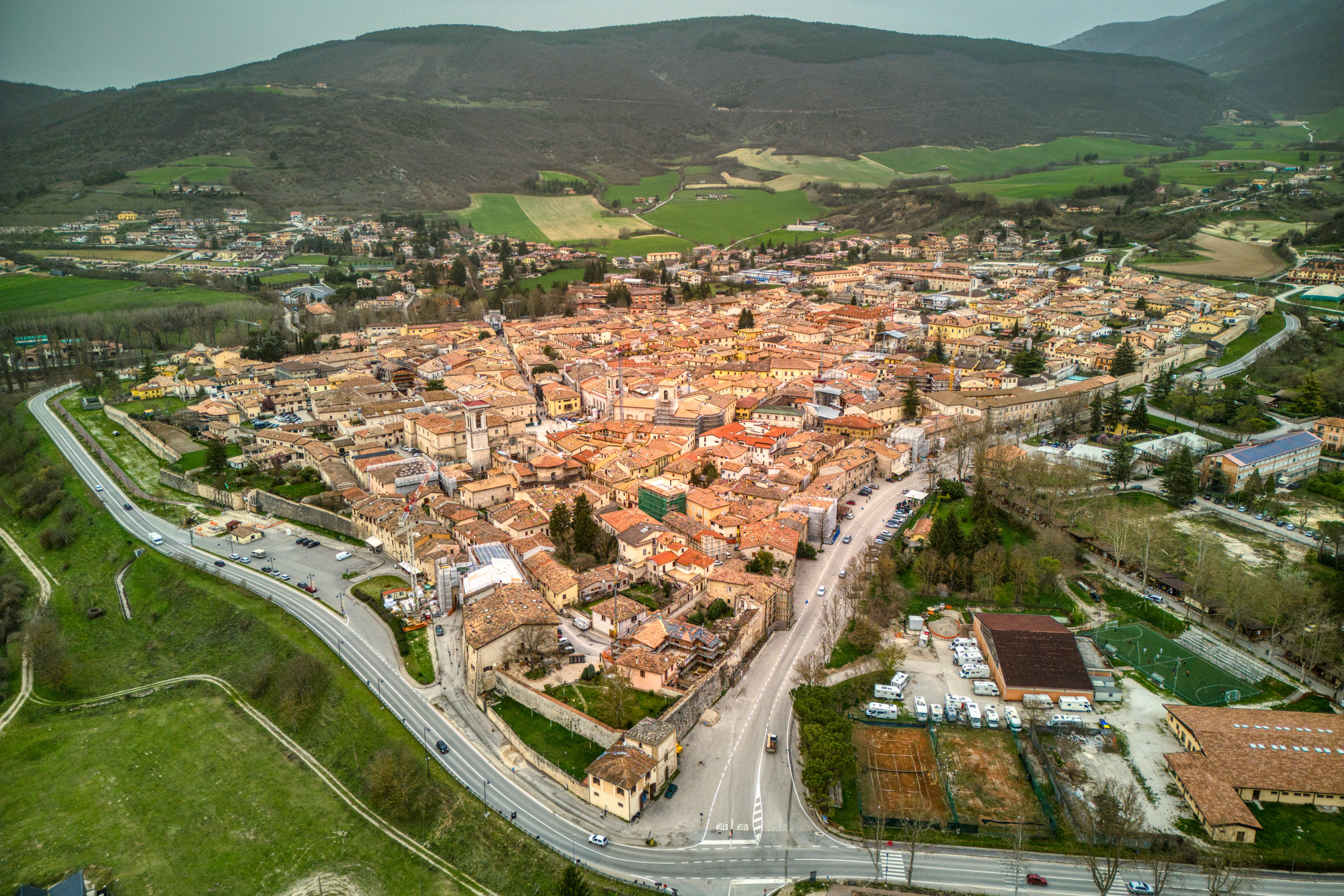
Norcia

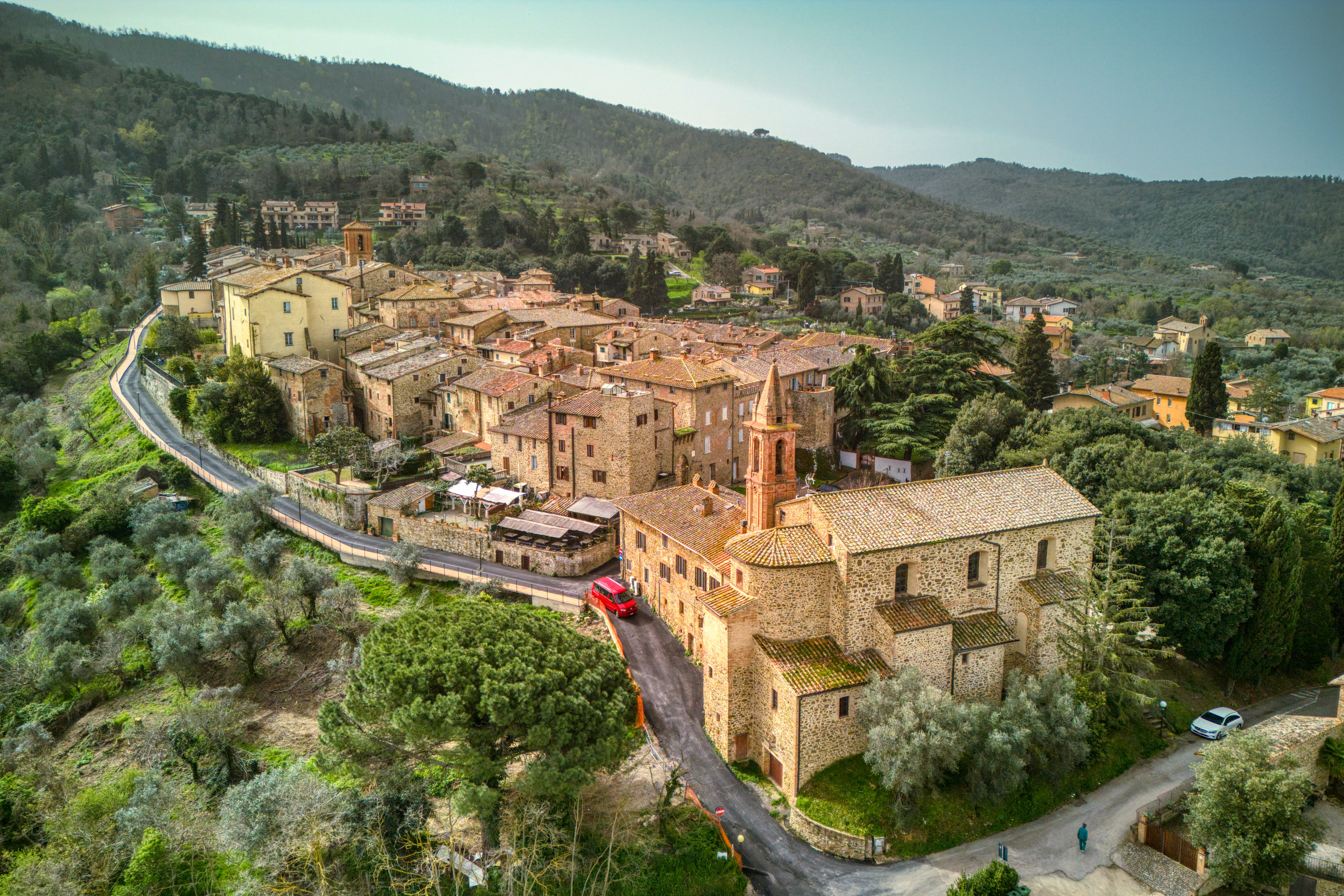
Paciano

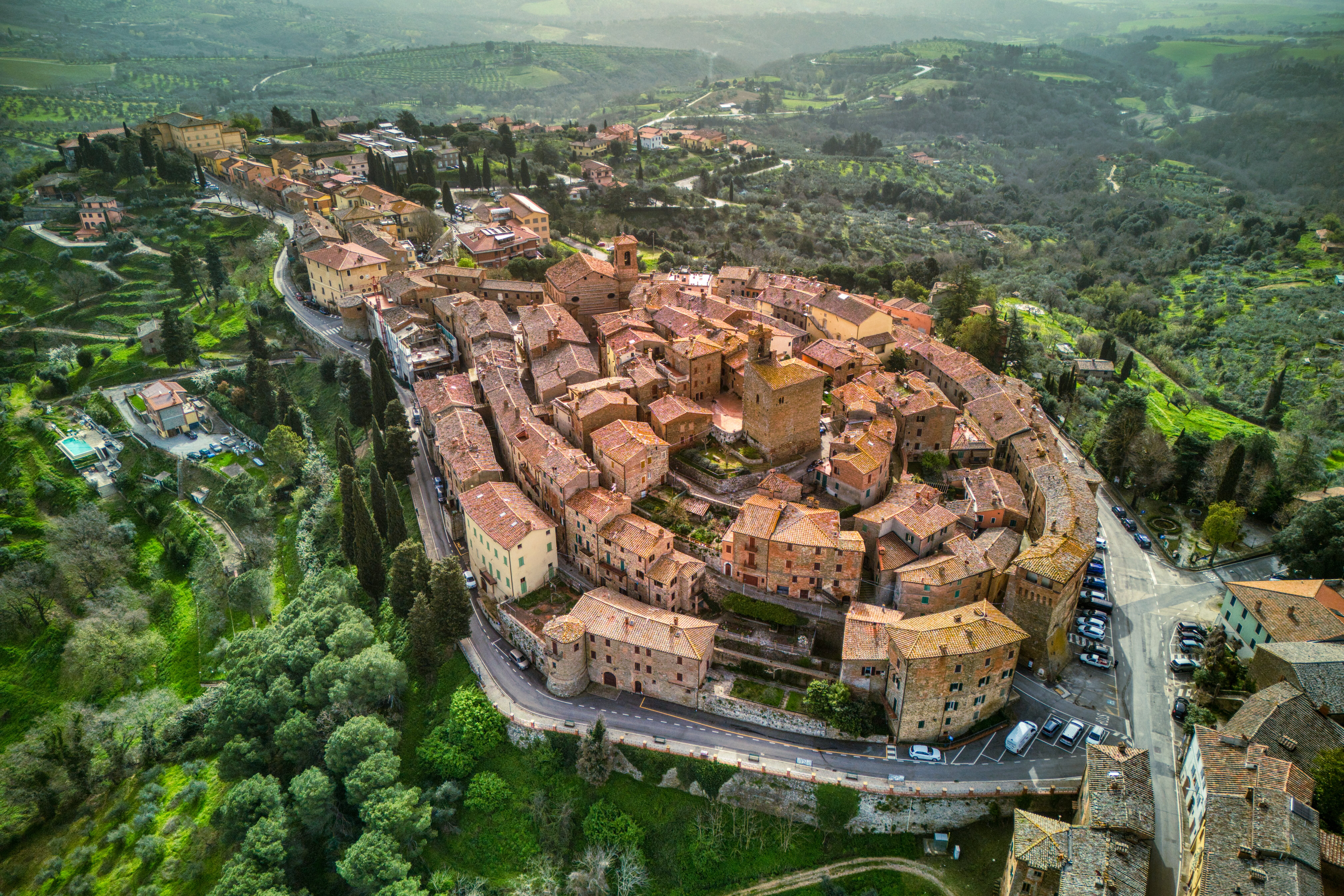
Panicale

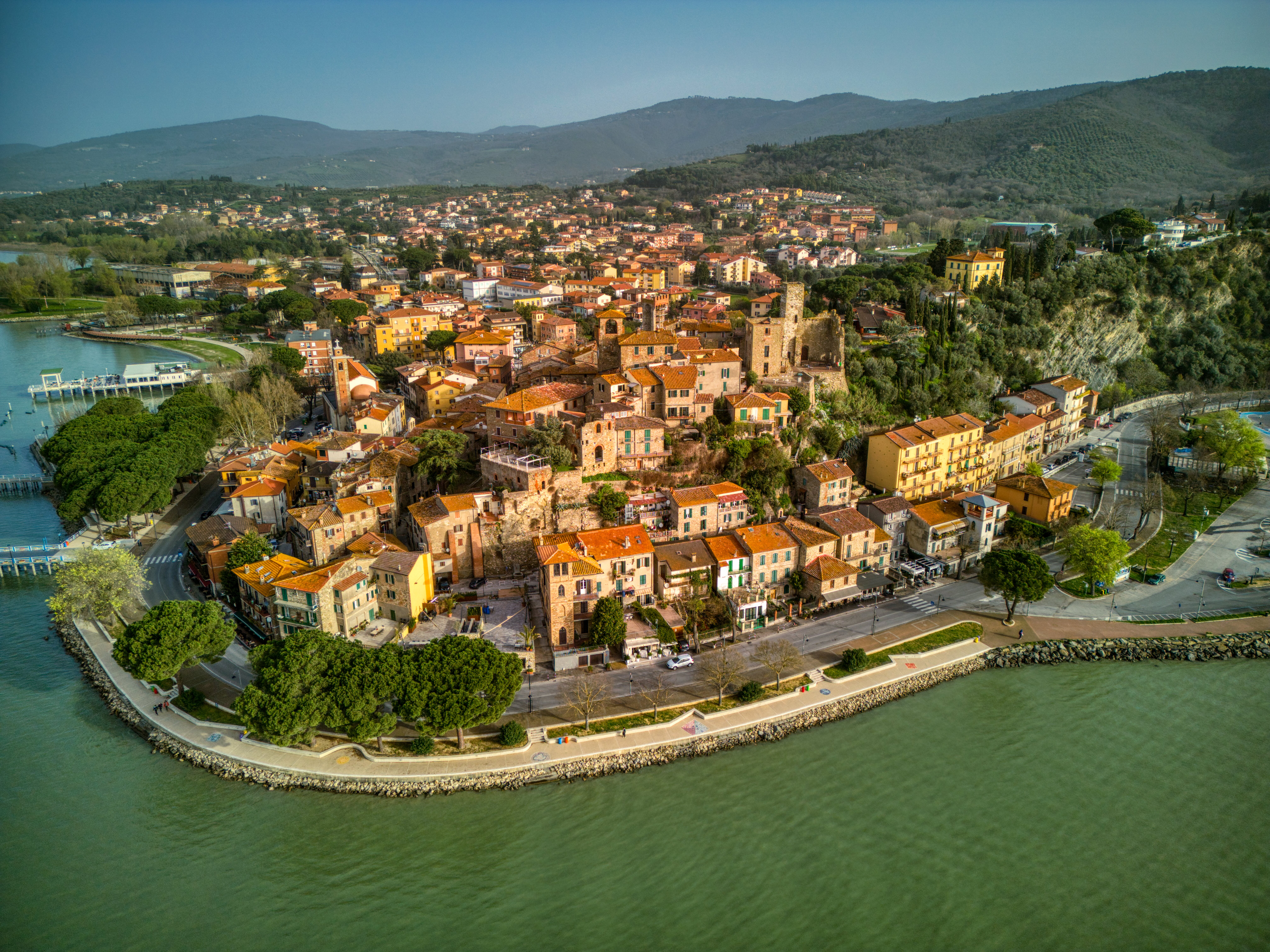
Passignano sul Trasimeno

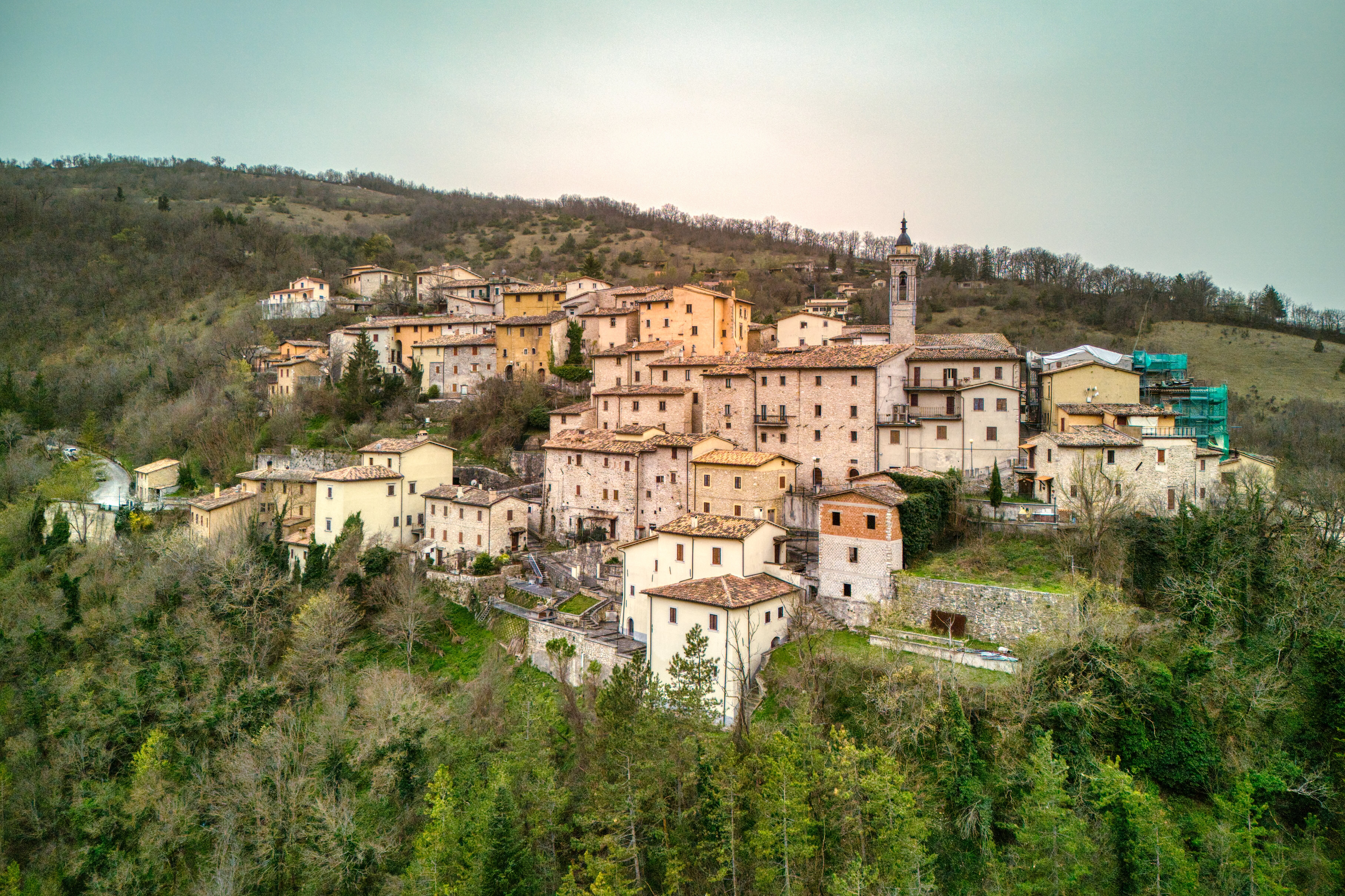
Preci

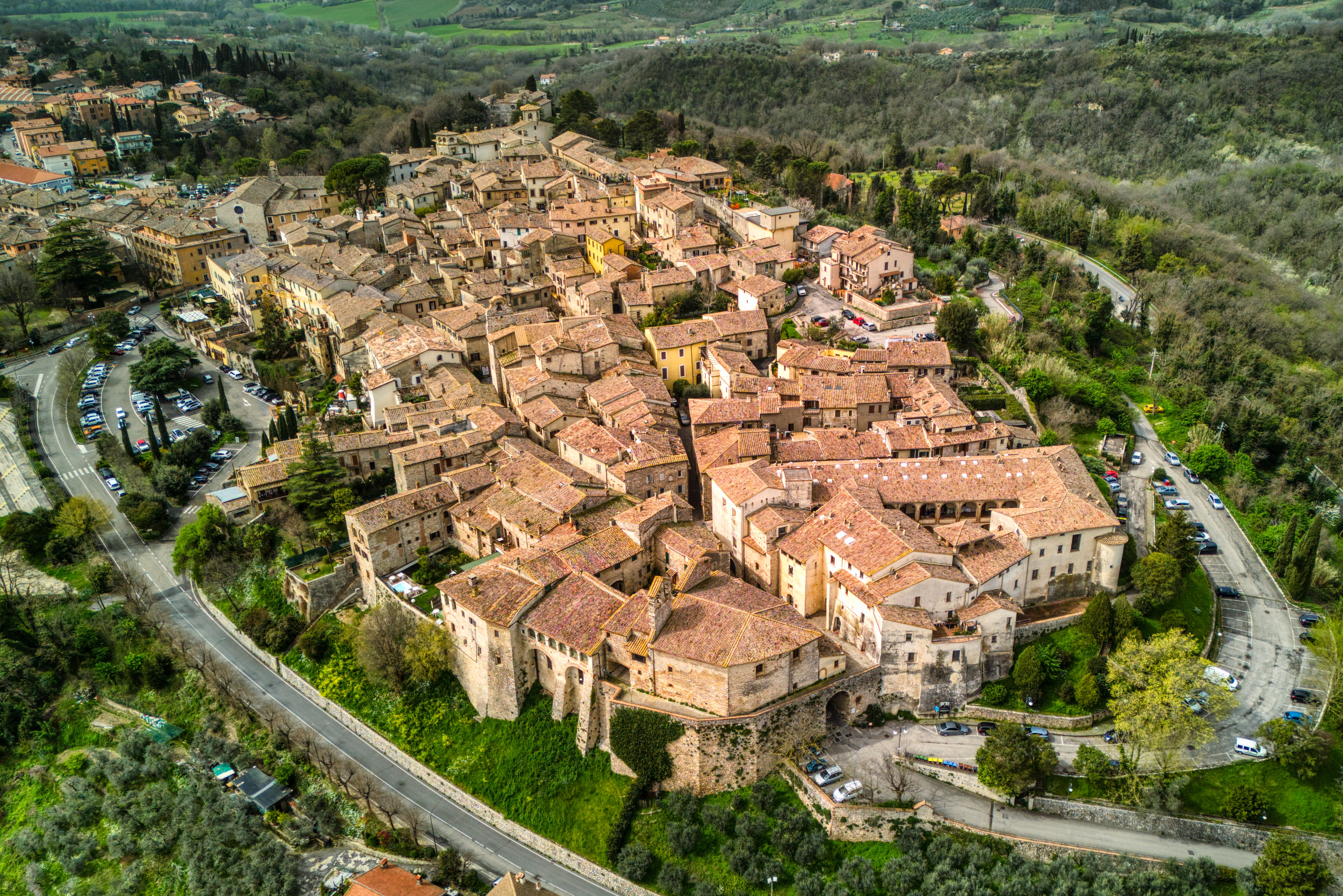
San Gemini

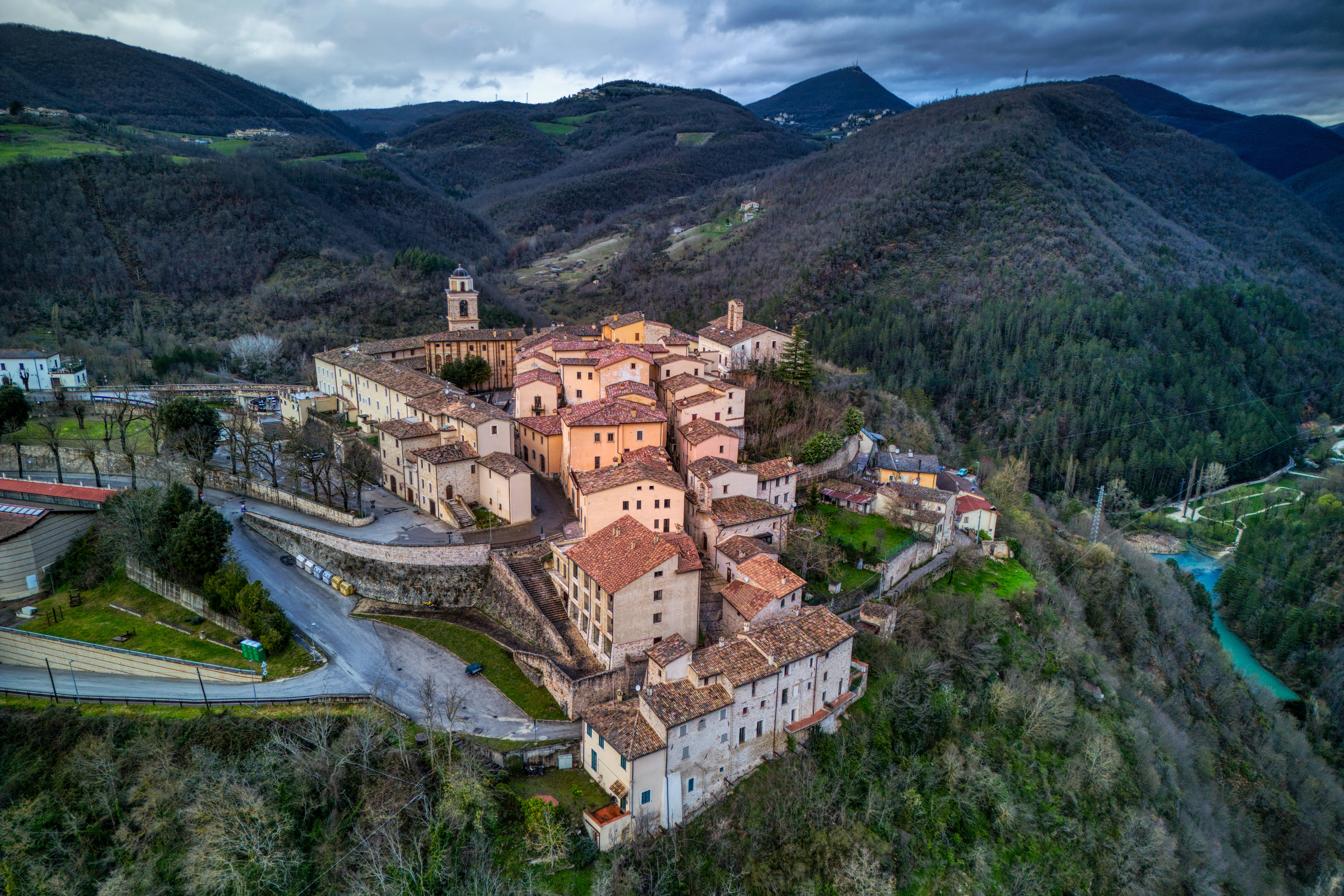
Sellano

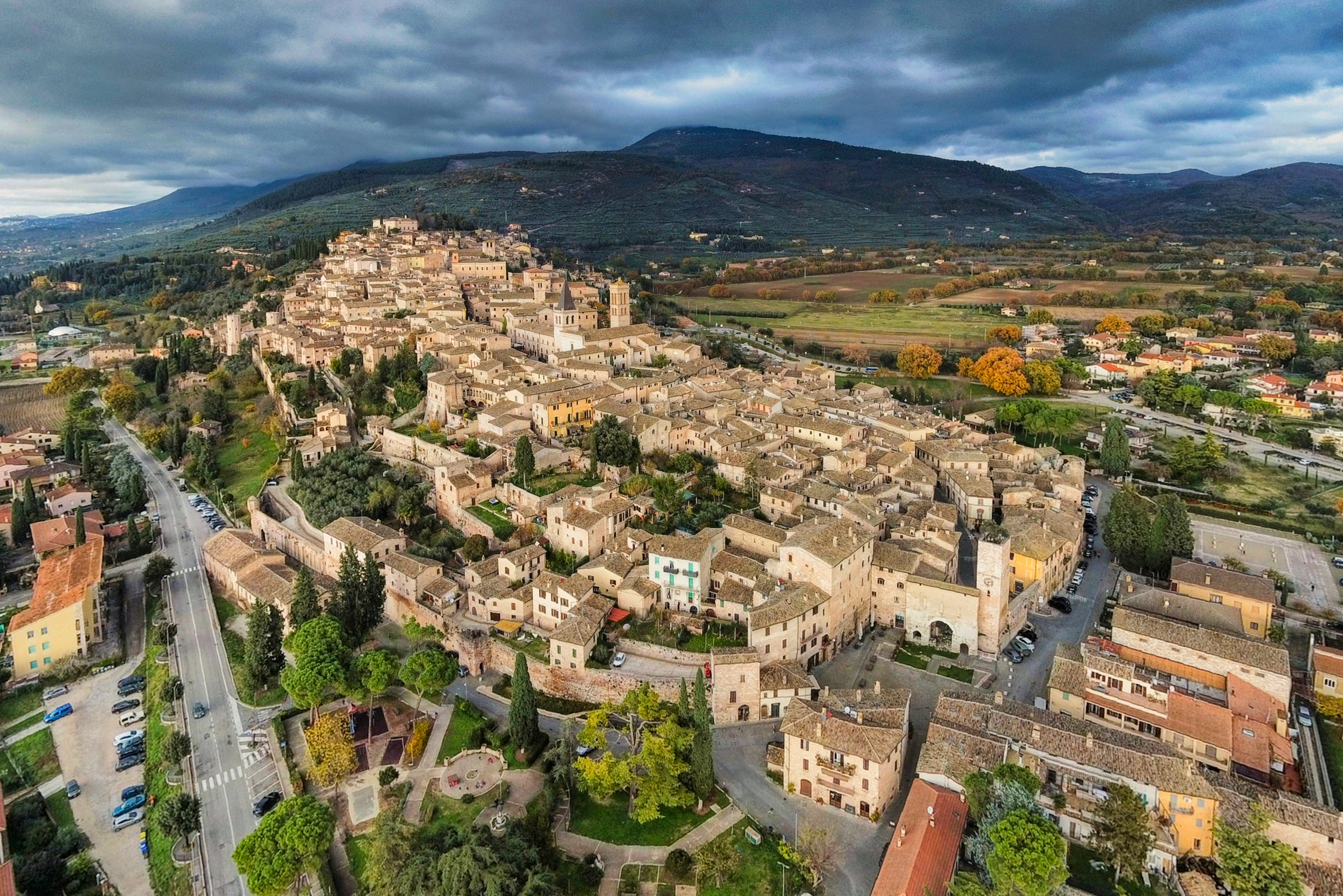
Spello

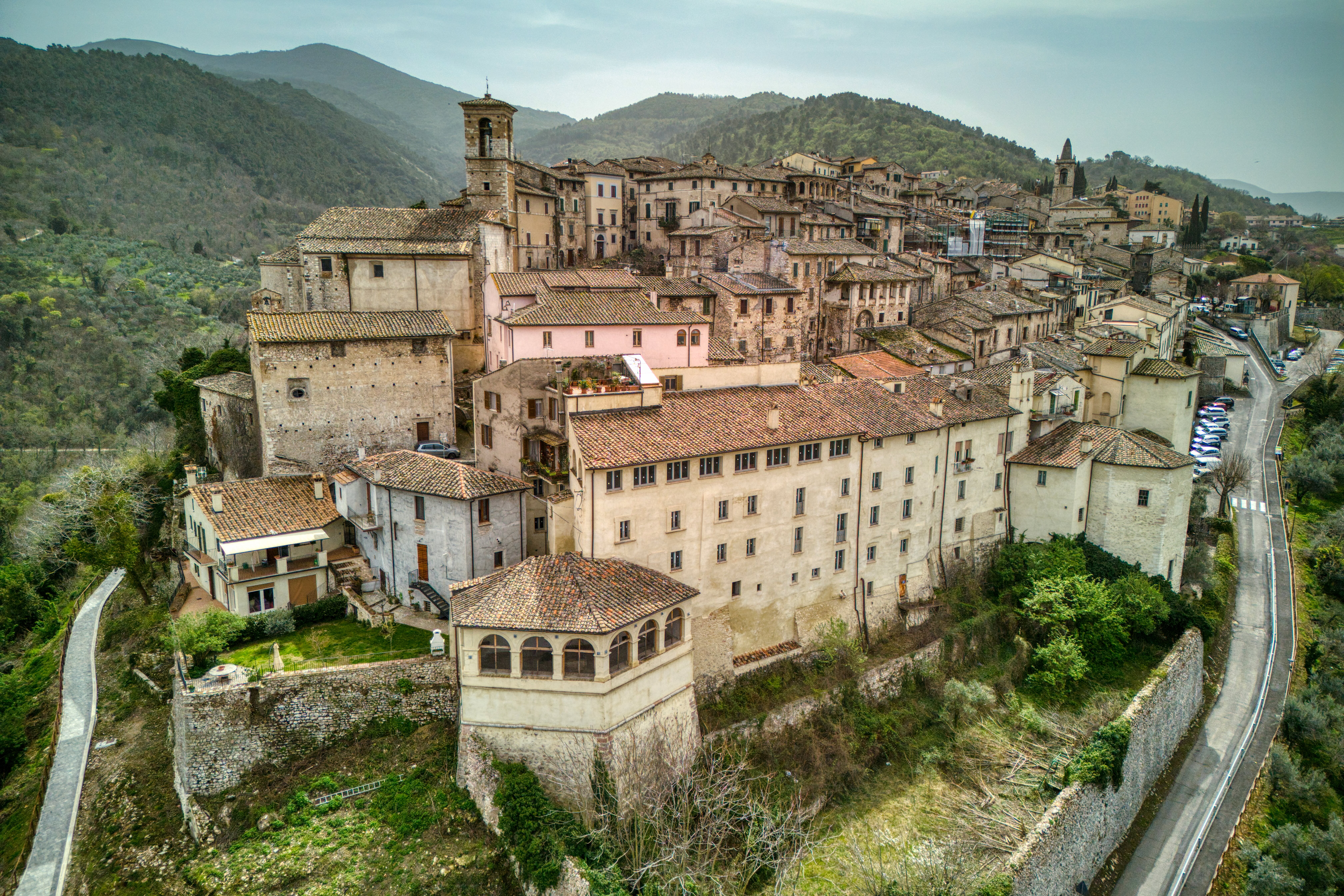
Stroncone

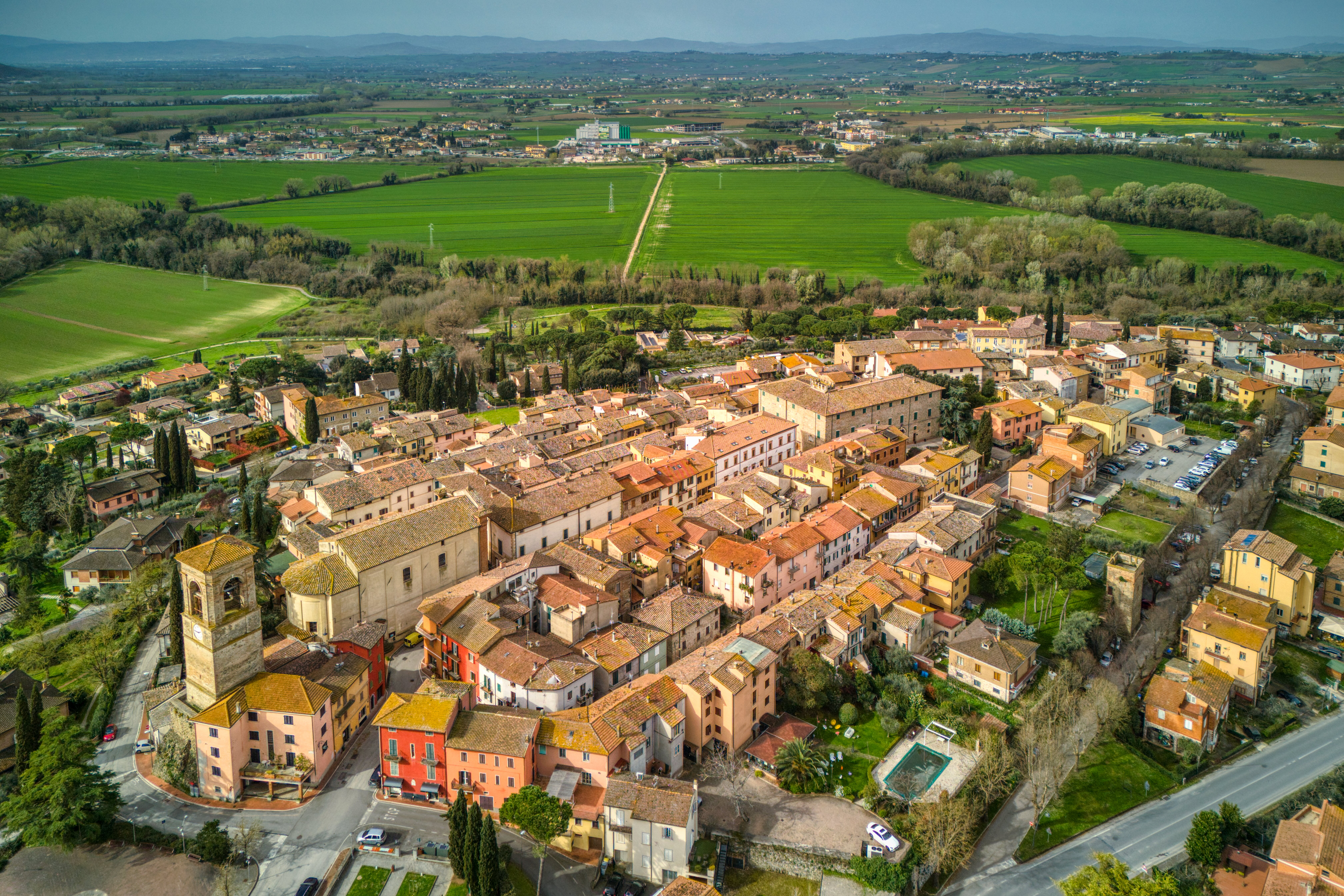
Torgiano

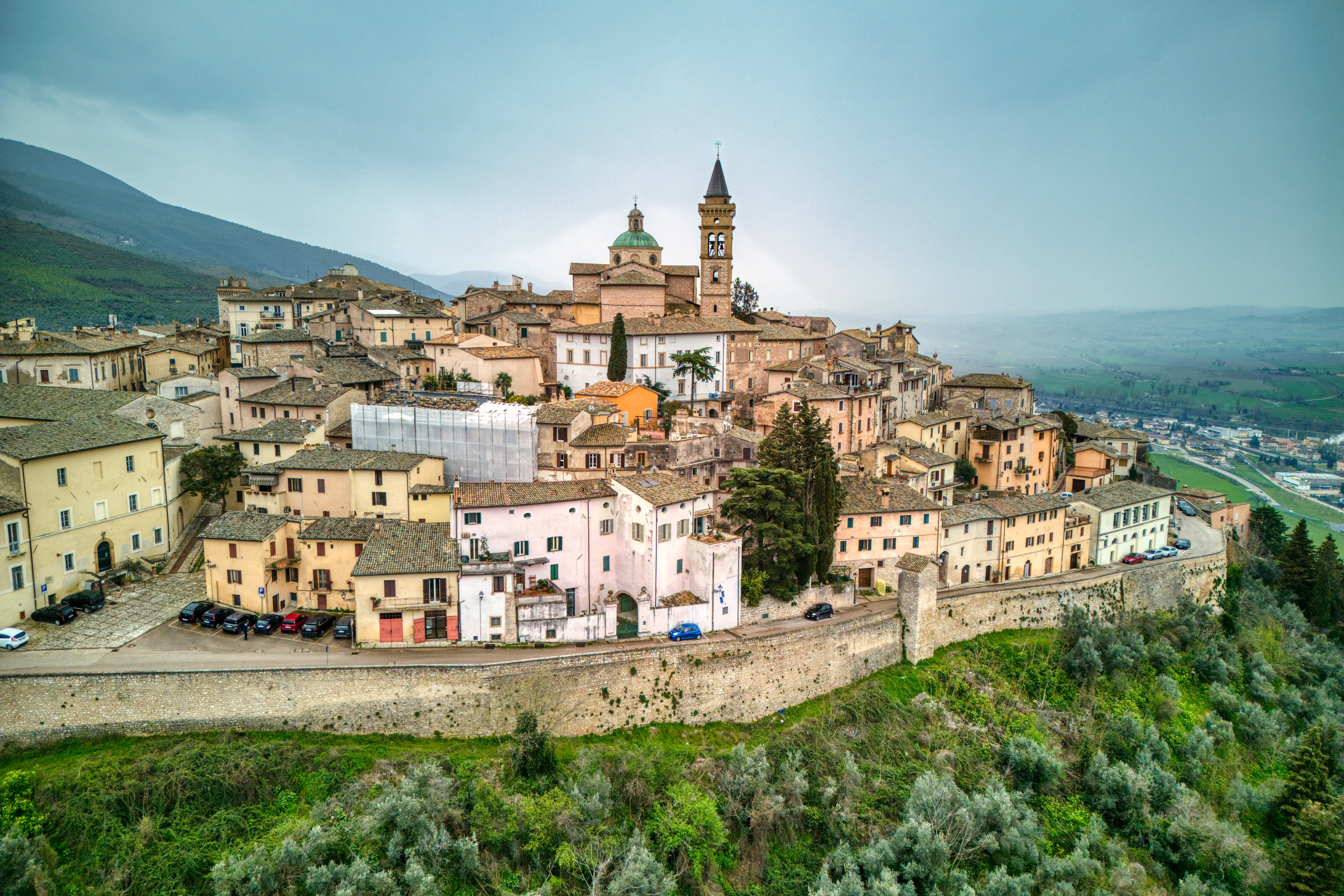
Trevi

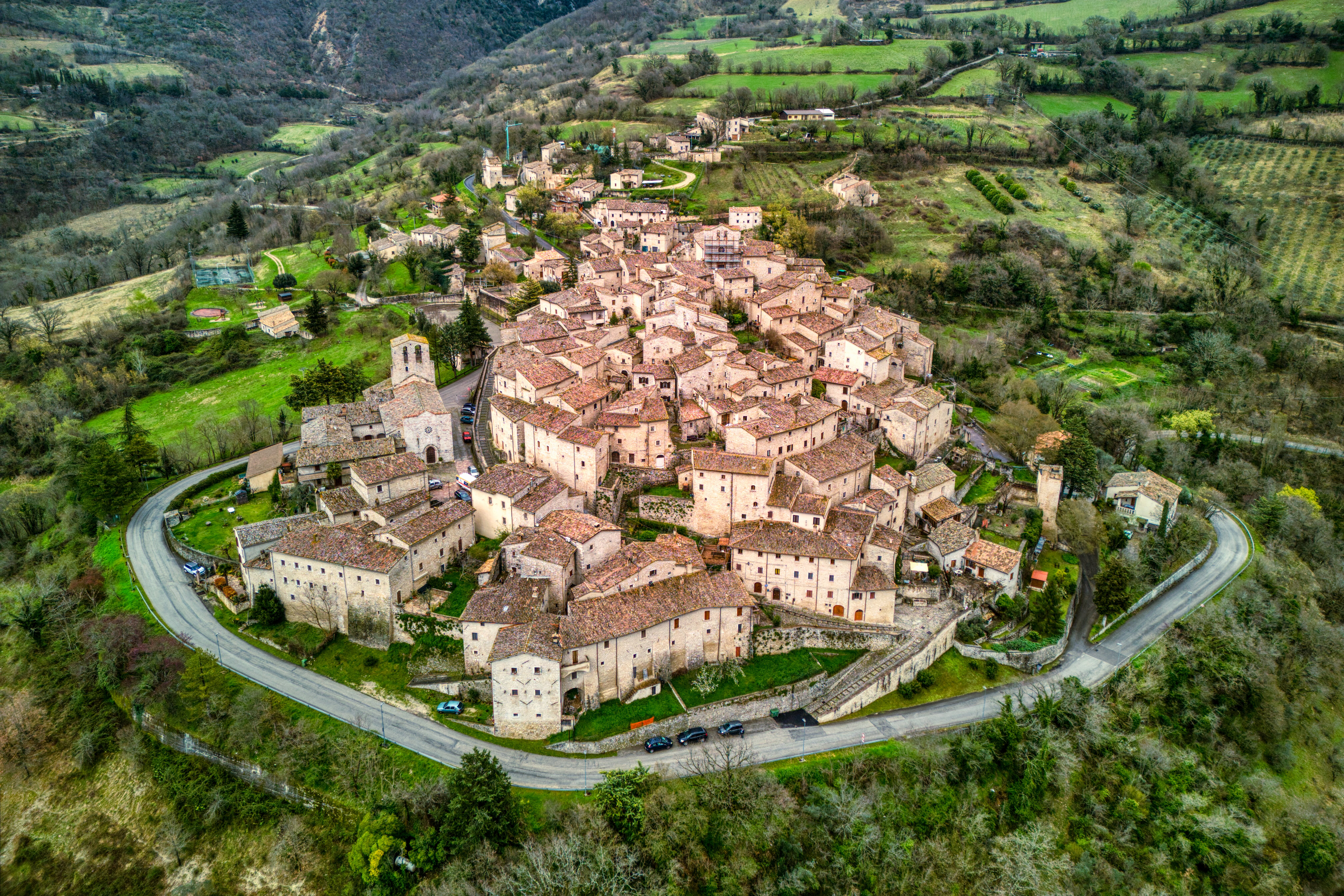
Vallo di Nera

== See also ==
- List of municipalities of Italy
