= Santa Maria Assunta, Vallo di Nera =

Roman Catholic church in Vallo di Nero in Italy

Coordinates: 42.75511°N 12.86294°E

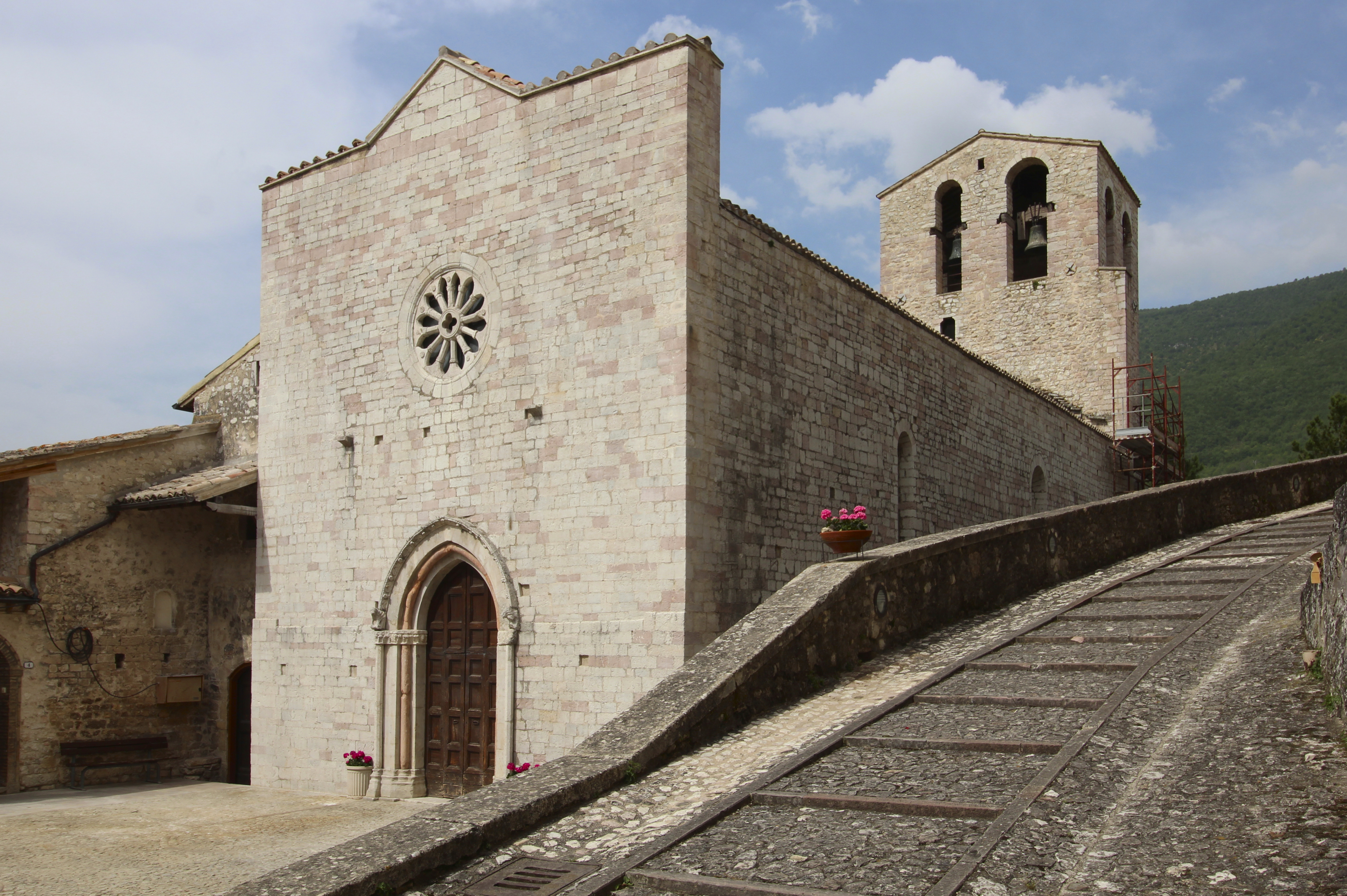
Facade and apse bell-tower

Santa Maria Assunta is a Gothic and Romanesque style, Roman Catholic church in the town of Vallo di Nera, province of Perugia, region of Umbria, Italy.

== History ==
The church is located within the town walls, and is first documented in 1176. By 1250 the church was occupied by Franciscan monks, who in 1273 enlarged the church and utilized one of the defensive towers of the walls to convert into a bell-tower. Over the centuries, the church suffered from abandon and disrepair. In 1652, the Franciscan monastery in this town was suppressed, and the church converted to a parish church dedicated anew to the Virgin of the Assumption. Over the next centuries, the monastery was sold off, and the Baroque interiors were stripped in the 19th century. This revealed some of the earlier fresco decoration. The church was damaged by the 2016 earthquake but since restored.

== Architecture and decoration ==
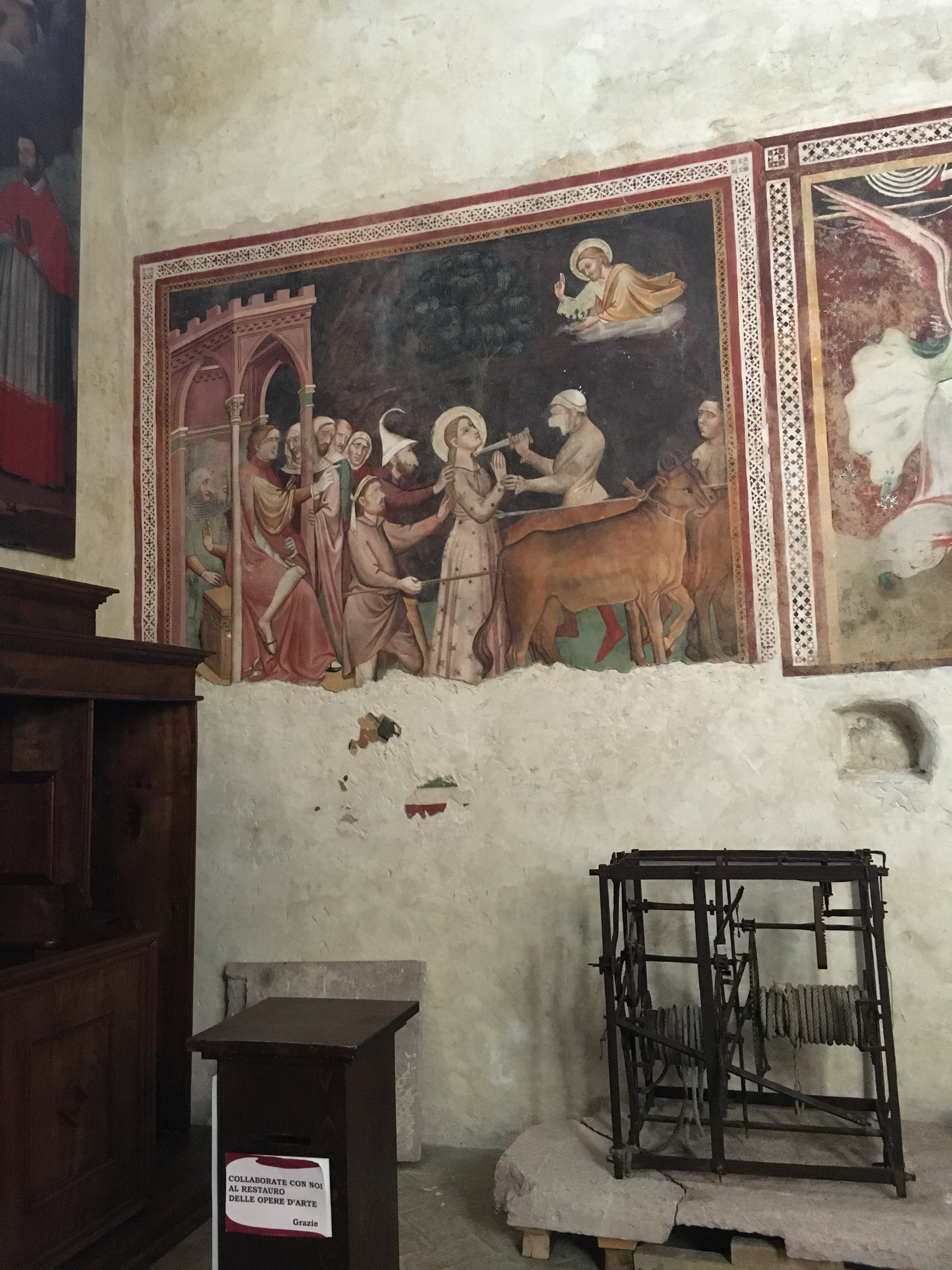
Martyrdom of St Lucy by Cola di Pietro.

The white stone and brick facade is simple with a single ogival portal and a high rose-window. The portal has foliated capitals. The rustic bell-tower adjacent to the apse has three bells from the 14th-century. The former clock from the tower has been dismounted and is on display in the adjacent cloister.

The interior of the church was at one time nearly fully frescoed, now fragments remained including most of the apse frescoes. On the left closest to the entrance, is a fresco, attributed to Cola di Pietro of Camerino, depicting the Martyrdom of Santa Lucia. St Lucy is shown standing behind oxen that were meant to dismember her, but remained immobile, and thus requiring an official to stab her with a sword. Other 15th-century frescoes around the left wall depict an Annunciation, a Madonna of the Mercy, a St Catherine the Martyr, St Francis and St Gabriel Archangel. Around the left side altar are frescoes dating to 1602 with God the Father in the tympanum, an Annunciation, two noble heraldic shields, an Immaculate Conception, an Enthroned Madonna. Some of the remaining 15th-century frescoes are attributed to the Master of Eggi.

The complex set of apse frescoes. dated to 1383, are attributed to Cola di Pietro and Francesco di Antonio, cover over a larger Crucifixion by the Master of Cesi. The crucifix in the main altarpiece is a copy of a stolen artwork. In the church a plaque recalls that towns people locked in the church on March 30, 1944, escaped being massacred.
