= Vallo di Nera =

- Comune
- Comune di Vallo di Nera
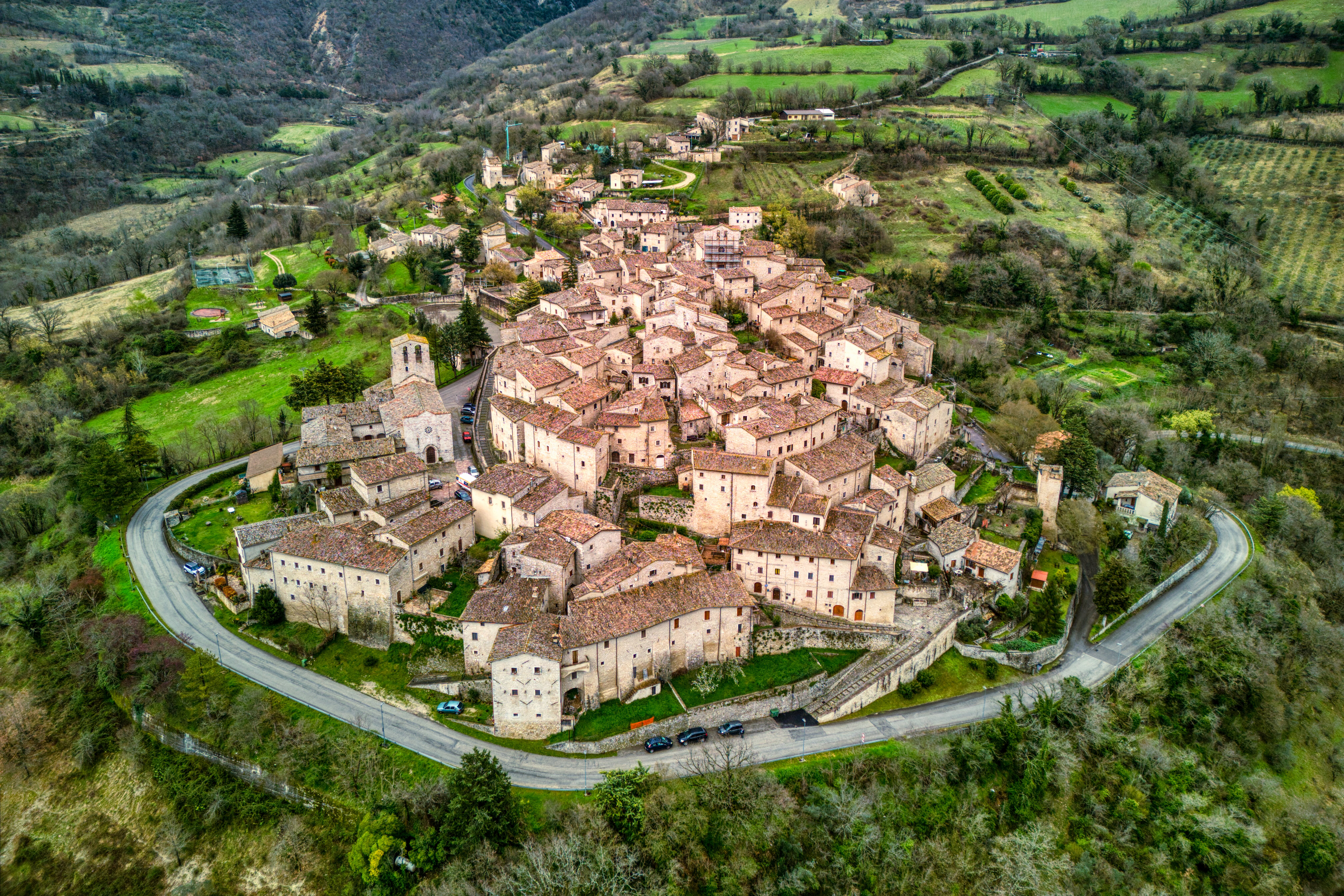
- View of Vallo di Nera

- Coat of arms

- Location within Italy Location within Umbria
- Coordinates: 42.769719°N 12.862349°E
- Country: Italy
- Region: Umbria
- Province: Perugia (PG)

Government
  - Mayor: Agnese Benedetti

Area
  - Total: 36.0 km^{2} (13.9 sq mi)
- Elevation: 467 m (1,532 ft)

Population (1 January 2025)
  - Total: 334
  - Density: 9.28/km^{2} (24.0/sq mi)
- Demonym: Vallani
- Time zone: UTC+1 (CET)
  - Summer (DST): UTC+2 (CEST)
- Postal code: 06040
- Dialing code: 0743
- Patron saint: St.Giovanni Battista
- Saint day: 24 June
- Website: Official website

Vallo di Nera is a comune (municipality) in the Province of Perugia in the Italian region Umbria, located about 60 km southeast of Perugia. It is one of I Borghi più belli d'Italia ("The most beautiful villages of Italy").

== Etymology ==
The origin of the place name remains uncertain. It has been linked to the valley in which the settlement lies, which in earlier forms appears as Castrum Vallis. Another interpretation connects it to the Latin vallum, referring to a Roman defensive rampart. A further possibility derives it from a Lombard term, vald, meaning woodland.

== History ==
Archaeological evidence attests to settlements in the area as early as the 8th century BC. The first documentary reference dates to 1177, when the settlement is recorded as a feudal possession under Conrad of Urslingen, duke of Spoleto. In 1217 the authorities of Spoleto granted the site of Flezano together with the right to build a castle.

Throughout the medieval period the locality occupied a strategic position and was contested between the Papal States and Spoleto, although it generally remained loyal to Spoleto.

Local statutes approved in 1563 regulated community life until 1796. During the Roman Republic of 1798 a municipal representative was appointed for Vallo and nearby settlements. The French withdrawal in 1799–1800 was followed by provisional Austrian rule and the restoration of ordinary administration. Between 1809 and 1814 the territory was included in the rural canton of Spoleto under Napoleonic rule.

Administrative boundaries shifted repeatedly in the early 19th century. In 1816–1817 the area was reassigned between Spoleto and Campello, and in 1827 it was placed under the governorate of Spoleto within the new papal administrative structure.

In the mid-19th century the municipality had a population of 302 inhabitants. Of these, 30 individuals lived in the countryside.

Proposals advanced in 1868–1869 sought the suppression of the municipality and its merger with neighboring areas. In 1871 the municipal seat was transferred to Piedipaterno, and in 1881 Meggiano and Paterno were merged with the municipality, which thereafter operated from Piedipaterno.

The municipality was suppressed in 1927 and annexed to Spoleto, but it was restored in 1930 with its seat at Piedipaterno.

== Geography ==
Vallo di Nera is a small settlement situated at an elevation of 433 metres (1,421 ft) above sea level in the upper Valnerina. It lies along the road connecting Terni to Norcia, at a distance of 38 kilometres (24 mi) from Terni.

=== Subdivisions ===
The municipality includes the localities of Geppa, Meggiano, Montefiorello, Paterno, Piedilacosta, Piedipaterno, Vallo di Nera.

In 2021, 9 people lived in rural dispersed dwellings not assigned to any named locality. At the time, the most populous localities were Vallo di Nera proper (113), Piedipaterno (107), Meggiano (62).

== Economy ==
In the 19th century the local economy was based on agriculture, with the territory producing cereals, hemp, and tree crops including olives and vines.

== Religion and culture ==
=== Santa Caterina ===
The oldest parts of the church of Santa Caterina date to the 14th century or the early 15th century, including the bell gable, the rear wall and the entrance to the monastery.

The present façade dates to the 16th century and includes a Renaissance portal, an oculus, and a bell gable with two superimposed bells. The interior consists of a single nave with a trussed roof. The altar is detached from the wall and framed by an openwork structure with plant motifs. Above it is a 17th-century painting of Roman school, depicting the Mystic Marriage of Saint Catherine with Saints Peter, Paul, John the Baptist and Nicholas of Tolentino.

=== San Giovanni Battista ===
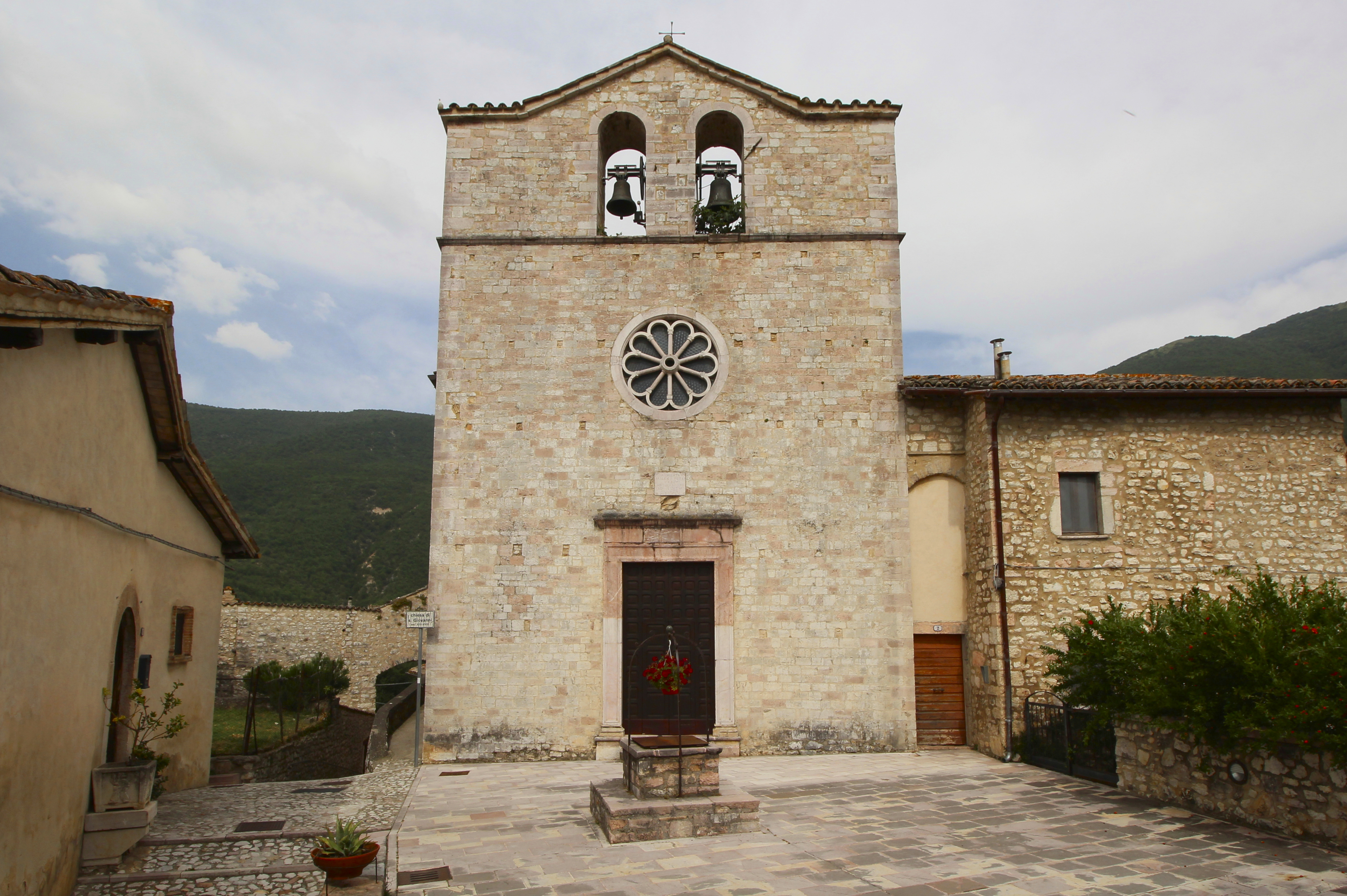
Church of San Giovanni Battista

The church of San Giovanni Battista was constructed between the 13th and 14th centuries, with the apse belonging to this earlier phase, and was enlarged and partially rebuilt in the 16th century. The façade, with its bell tower, portal and rose window, dates from this later period.

The interior preserves several works of art, including a 16th-century baptismal font and a fresco dated 1536 by Jacopo Siculo in the apse depicting the Death of the Virgin, representative of 16th-century Italian painting of the school of Raphael. The same artist painted a Christ in piety with symbols of the Passion, as well as an Annunciation and full-length figures of Saint Sebastian and Saint Roch on the arch.

Other works include a holy oil vessel dated 1504, numerous 16th-century paintings, and relics dating from 1722 to 1814. Along the side walls are the fourteen Stations of the Cross from 1749.

=== Santa Maria ===
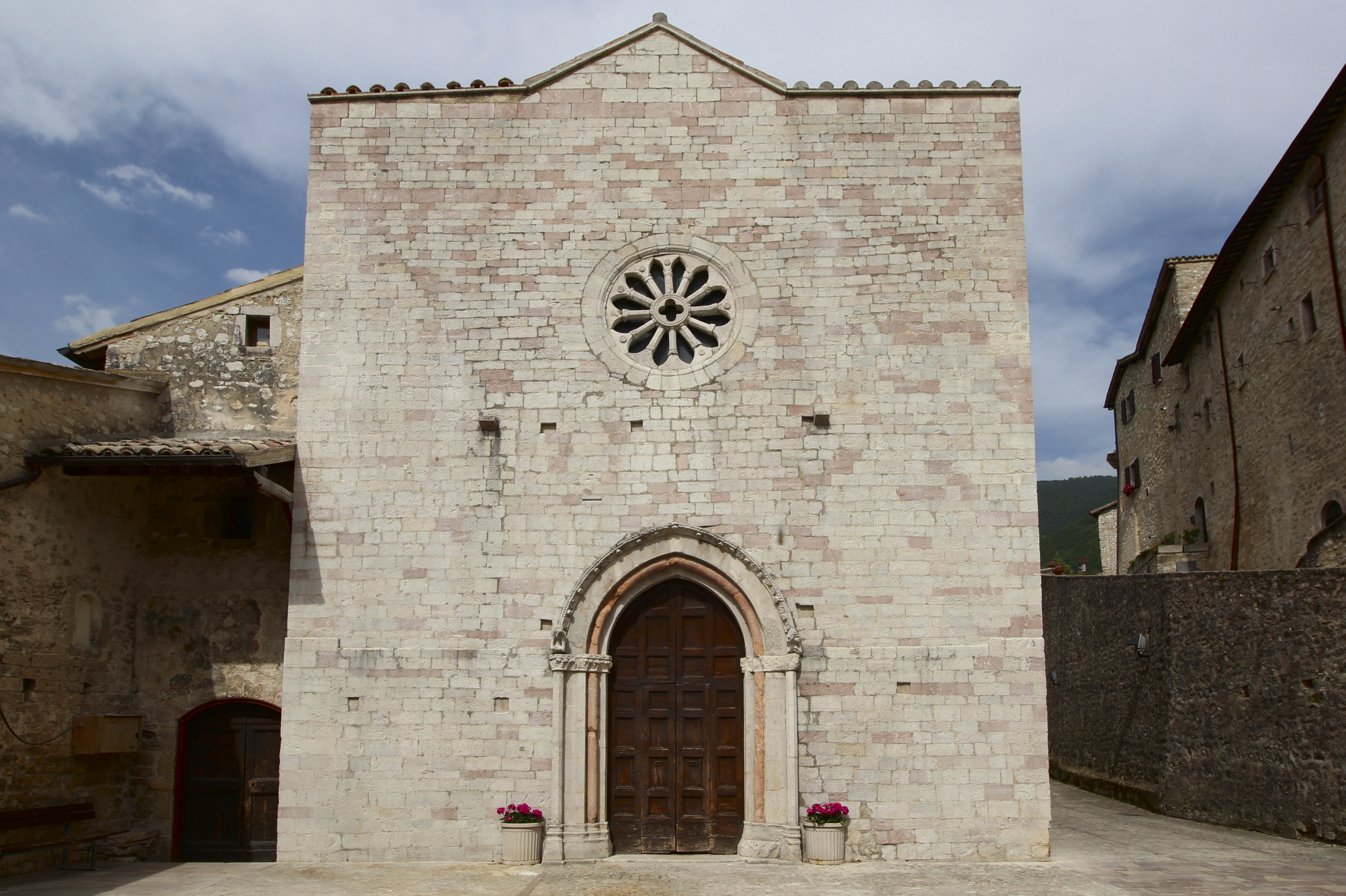
Church of Santa Maria Assunta

The church of Santa Maria Assunta dates to around 1176. In the early 14th century it passed to the Conventual Franciscans, who enlarged the original structure and converted one of the defensive towers into a bell tower. In 1652, under Pope Innocent X, it was rededicated to Santa Maria Assunta.

The façade, built of dressed stone, reflects the Romanesque style of the Spoleto area and is crowned by a central gable. It features a Gothic portal with decorative capitals and friezes, surmounted by a rose window with twelve small columns. A substantial bell tower rises above the presbytery and houses a large 14th-century bell.

The interior walls are decorated with numerous frescoes by artists of the Giottesque school, including Giovanni Boccati, Girolamo di Giovanni, and members of the workshop of Cola di Pietro da Camerino. The apse was frescoed in 1383 by Cola di Pietro da Camerino with Francesco di Antonio.

Among the frescoes are depictions of various saints, including Julian, Anthony Abbot, Peter, Paul, John the Baptist, James the Greater and Michael the Archangel. Other works include a representation of the Procession of the Whites, associated with the penitential movement of 1399, and later images such as a Madonna enthroned with Child, Saint Clare and Saint Mary of Egypt, as well as figures of Saints Roch and Sebastian painted in 1486 in connection with outbreaks of plague.

The sacristy contains 15th-century decorations and paintings attributed to the Maestro di Eggi, including scenes of the Crucifixion, the Annunciation and figures of saints. The church formerly housed a painted cross from the early 13th century, now preserved in the diocesan museum of Spoleto.

=== San Rocco ===
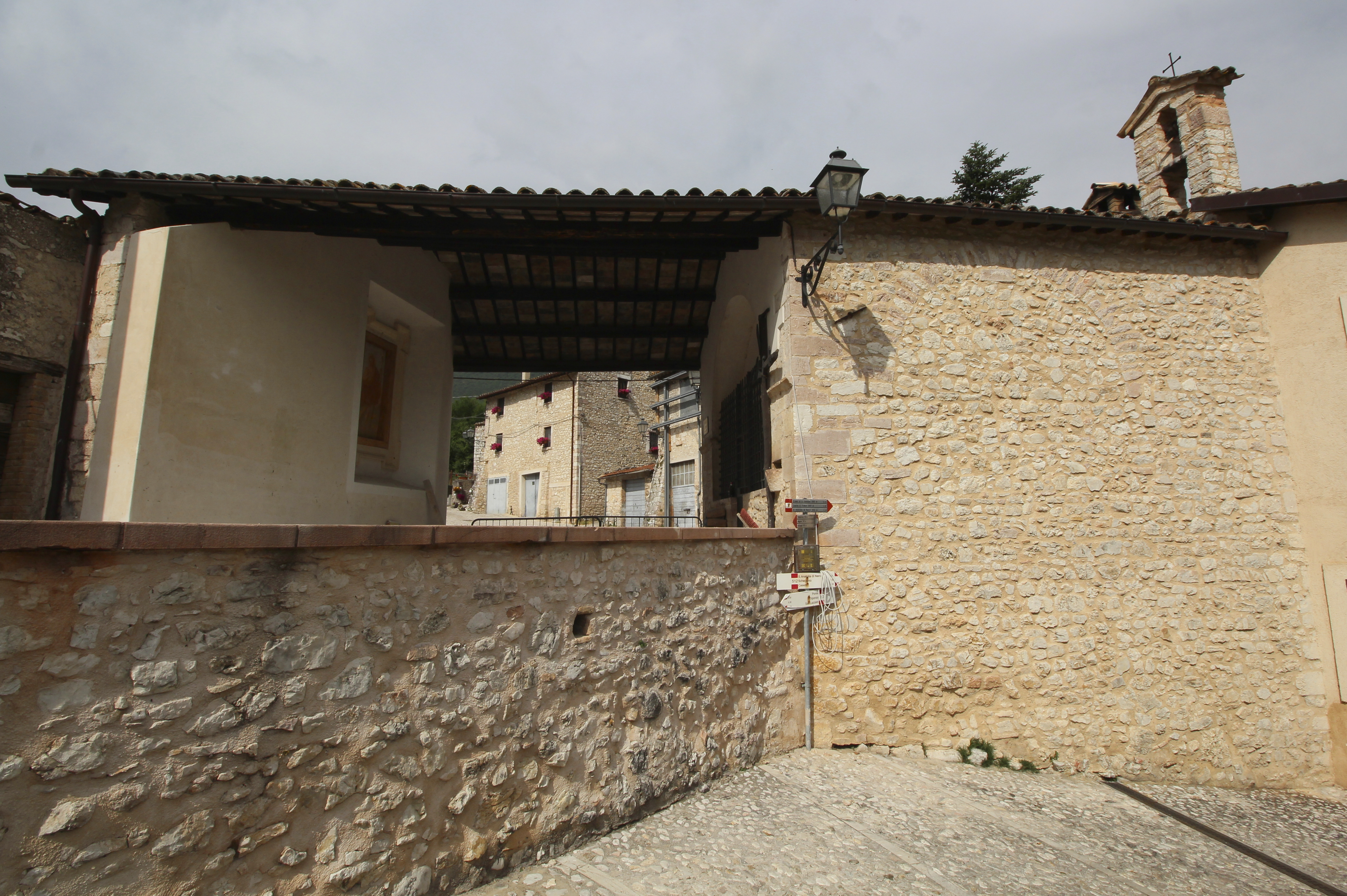
Church of San Rocco

The church of San Rocco, located outside the settlement along the road leading to the rural hamlets, was built in the 15th century. The façade is gabled and preceded by a portico extending along the road.

The interior preserves frescoes contemporary with the construction, including, on the stucco altar, a Madonna lactans dating to the second half of the 15th century.
