= 2022 in archaeology =

This page lists significant events of 2022 in archaeology.

== Explorations ==
- The GAZAMAP project, an international collaboration between British and Palestinian organisations, surveyed Tell es-Sakan and Tell Ruqeish in the Gaza Strip.

February

- Ard-al-Moharbeen necropolis in the Gaza Strip, Palestine is discovered during the construction of a housing project.

== Excavations ==
February

- Archaeologists begin excavation in Haverfordwest, Wales, of the site of a medieval priory (Haverfordwest Priory) containing 240 burials at the location of a former department store.

July

- 12 – Archaeologists from The University of Manchester have excavated for the first time the 5,000-year-old Neolithic chamber tomb linked to King Arthur, the legendary ruler of Camelot. The excavation was carried out around the chamber of nine upright stones weighing more than 25 tons in present-day Herefordshire, England.
- Excavation at Khirbet Tibnah in the Ramallah and al-Bireh Governorate in the State of Palestine, led by Dvir Raviv of the Bar-Ilan University.

Autumn

- Start of long-term multi-site multi-period excavations across Sizewell C nuclear power station construction site on the Suffolk coast of England.

== Finds ==
January

- 24 – Archaeologists announced the discovery of thousands of prehistoric pits during an electromagnetic induction field survey around Stonehenge
- 25 – Archaeologists announced the discovery of an intact 2,000-year-old blue glass bowl with a trim rim and a vertical stripe pattern in the Dutch city of Nijmegen in Netherlands.

February

- 1 – Velia excavation reported the discovery of two well-preserved bronze Greek helmets with Etruscan design, the remains of a painted brick wall and vases at the site of Velia in Italy.
- 2 – Archaeologists from the Israel Antiquities Authority announced the discovery of a 1.5-million-year-old complete hominin vertebra. The fossilized bone belonging to a juvenile between the ages of 6-12 is estimated as the oldest evidence of ancient hominini in the Middle East.
- 3
  - Archaeologists announced the discovery of the remains of a woolly mammoth, reindeer, rhinoceros, bison, wolf and hyena in a cave system during the building of a new town named Sherford in Devon (England).
  - Australian researchers claimed to have discovered the wreck of Captain Cook's HMS Endeavour off Newport, Rhode Island in North America where she was sunk in 1778.
- 4 – Around 40 skeletons with their skulls relocated are among 425 bodies exhumed by archaeologists from a large Roman cemetery in Buckinghamshire, England, on the course of HS2, it is announced.
- 9 - Archeologists founded an inscription in Gemekan, Mojokerto, East Java, Indonesia during the temple excavation. The inscription was believed to date back to the Mataram kingdom era. The inscription was named Masahar.
- 14 – Archaeologists announced the discovery of 1,000-1,200 years-old six mummified children in Peru, thought to have been sacrificed, probably to accompany a dead elite man to the afterlife.
- 22 – Discovery of a large, well-preserved Roman mosaic, believed to date from A.D. 175–225 was announced by the researchers from the Museum of London Archaeology (MOLA) in Southwark district in London.

March

- 1 – A 19th-century drontheim fishing vessel was uncovered by storms on the beach at Portrush in Northern Ireland.
- 5 – Discovery of wreck of Endurance (1912 ship) under the Antarctic ice.
- 8
  - Archaeologists conducted radiocarbon analyses and announced the dating of a curved hunting bow discovered in 2021. The bow was probably 460 years old, and its origin ranged from 1506 to 1660.
  - Archaeologists announced that photographic evidence of 8,000-year-old humans excavated in the valley of the Sado River in Portugal during the 1960s indicates some deliberate mummification, making them the world's oldest known mummies.
- 15 – Discovery of a 1,500-year-old silver extraction site and a lead-lined coffin inside a stone mausoleum at the same location in Kent (South East England) was announced.
- 19 – Five well-decorated ancient tombs found at the Saqqara necropolis were put on display in Cairo. They date back to the Old Kingdom of Egypt, around 2700BC to 2200BC.

April

- 5 – Archaeologists announced the discovery of two 4,000-year-old Bronze Age axe heads on farmland in Wiltshire in England.
- 26 – A 4,500-year-old statue of Anat was discovered in Khan Younis, Gaza Strip.
- April – Dungeness Tudor ship found near the south coast of England.

May

- 3 – Research into the inscriptions and use of several hundred astragali – animal knucklebone gaming dice – used 2,300 years ago and found at the Maresha-Bet Guvrin National Park in southern Israel, is published.
- 9 – Discovery of the nearly 4,300-year-old tomb of an ancient Egyptian high-ranked person who handled royal, sealed documents of pharaoh was announced at Saqqara, Egypt.
- 20 – Archaeologists reported the rediscovery of Orconectes sheltae at Shelta Cave for the first time since 1988 in Huntsville, USA.
- 22 - More than 2,500 Roman coins have been found in San Casciano dei Bagni.
- 23 - Several objects, including the head of the Heracles of Antikythera, from the Antikythera wreck in Greece.
- 27 – Archaeologists reported the discovery of 1,400-year-old remains of the Mayan site so-called Xiol on the outskirts of Mérida with a large central plaza and at least 12 buildings, workshops, burial places of adults and children, and an altar that served a ritual purpose.
- 30 – 250 sarcophagi and 150 statuettes were displayed at Saqqara, dated back to the Late Period.
- 30 – Discovery of a 1,800-year-old well-preserved geometric patterned floor mosaic was announced in Pergamon, Turkey.

June

- 4 – Archaeologists from the Mexico's National Institute of Anthropology and History (INAH) announced the discovery of a 1,300-year-old nine-inch-tall plaster head statue indicating a young Hun Hunahpu, the Maya's mythological maize god.
- 7 – Archaeologists announced the discovery of a poorly preserved single-edged sabre among the ruins of a monastery on the coast of Chalcidice, Greece.
- 14 – Archaeologists announced the discovery of a turtle shell-shaped box, a sacrificial altar and pits full of gold, bronze and jade relics at the Sanxingdui archaeological site, China.
- 22 – Wreck of destroyer escort USS Samuel B. Roberts (DE-413), sunk in the Battle off Samar (1944), was located by submersible in the Philippine Sea at a depth of 6,895 metres (22,621 ft), making it the deepest wreck identified at this date.
- 26 – Turkish-Mongolian archaeologists announced the discovery of the ruins of a summer palace (caravanserai) thought to have been constructed by the Mongol Ilkhanate State ruler Hulagu Khan and decorated with swastika or "tamga" shaped roof tiles in the 1260s.

July

- 1 – Dutch archaeologists have announced that they have discovered the remains of a nearly 2,000-year-old temple complex where Roman soldiers once paid tribute to gods and goddesses in the village of Herwen-Hemeling in the Netherlands.
- 5 – Archaeologists discover 88 footprints that have been left behind by humans at least 12,000 years ago in Utah's Great Salt Lake Desert using ground-penetrating radar (GPR).
- 7 – Discovery of a 2.8 cm long 5.200 years old stone carving chrysalis in a semi-crypt house was announced at the Shangguo Site in Wenxi County.
- 8 – Discovery of a 1.4 million-year-old jawbone (maxilla) included a tooth of a hominid was announced at Sima del Elefante, Spain.
- 9 – Archaeologists from the Israel Antiquities Authority announced the discovery of an 8000 years-old Yarmukian "Mother Goddess" figurine at Sha'ar HaGolan archaeological site in Israel.
- 11 – Discovery of a 4,000-year-old female grave with jewels from the Early Bronze Age Nitra culture was announced in Brestovany, Slovakia.
- 12 – Archaeologists from the British Museum unearthed a Roman mosaic dating to the 4th century AD and hundreds of objects from regularly positioned such as jewelry, cash, roof tiles and kiln bricks at Hinton St Mary in Dorset.
- 12 – Archaeological survey funded by the Natural History Museum and the British Cave Research Society uncovered evidence of prehistoric megafauna such as reindeer and woolly mammoth bones, in addition to seashells, pigs and deer at Wogan Cavern beneath Pembroke Castle in Wales.
- 13 – Discovery of a 3000-year-old clay figurine that might represent a prehistoric female water goddess was announced in Schweinfurt district, in Germany.
- 17 – Archaeologists from the Prague's Charles University discovered the robbed tomb of an ancient Egyptian military official named Wahibre merry Neith and a scarab in Giza's Abusir necropolis 12 km southeast of the Pyramids of Giza.
- 18 – The Egyptian-French archaeological mission of the European Institute of Underwater Archeology announced the discovery of ancient Greek shipwreck with lots of treasures date back to the Ptolemaic era in Heracleion, Egypt.
- 20 – Marine archaeologists from Bournemouth University unearthed the relics of a 750 years old medieval shipwreck and its cargo off the coast of Dorset.
- 22 – Discovery of a hellenistic theater dates to the 2nd century BC was announced in Thera, Turkey.
- 25 – Marine archaeologists from the Israel Antiquities Authority (IAA) discovered a 1,850-year-old bronze Roman-era coin belonging to the reign of Emperor Antoninus Pius off the coast of Haifa.

August

- 2 – A Bronze Age cemetery with 8 burials including an outstanding young woman's treasure discovered in Mány, Hungary.
- 4 – Archaeologists from the Polish Academy of Sciences in Warsaw announced the discovery of a 4,500-year-old temple dedicated to the Egyptian sun god Ra.
- 11 – A British deep-sea diving team located the wreck of U.S. Navy destroyer USS Jacob Jones (torpedoed in 1917) off the Isles of Scilly.
- 13 – Archaeologists announced that they had discovered a child skeleton in an oval-shaped pit in Tozkoparan Mound in Pertek district, Turkey.
- 25 – Archaeologists announced the discovery of the 17 inches long Roman Period phallic sculpture carved on a stone in El Higuerón, Spain.

September

- Archaeologists announced the discovery of a Byzantine mosaic dating to the 5th–7th century in the Bureij refugee camp in Palestine.
- A child's leather shoe dating to 2800BP is found on the shore of the Thames Estuary, the oldest shoe found in the British Isles.
- 29 – Discovery of 500,000-year-old signs of extinct Homo Heidelbergensis in Tunel Wielki cave in Małopolska was announced by the University of Warsaw.

October

- 12 – Discovery of a 1,600-year-old Roman-era mosaic, measuring 20 by 6 metres (66 ft × 20 ft), under a building in Al-Rastan, Syria, announced.
- 28 – Discovery of a second mosaic at a Roman villa site in Rutland, in the midlands of England, announced.

November

- 8 – Discovery of at least 24 Etruscan-Roman bronze statues from the site of a thermal sanactuary announced (The Bronzes of San Casciano dei Bagni).
- 14 – A study reports the oldest likely evidence (via heated fish teeth from a deep cave) of controlled use of fire to cook food by archaic humans ~780,000 years ago.

December

- A mosaic at Publius Vedius Pollio's villa is discovered in Pausylipon, Naples
- A viking grave has discovered in western Oslo, Norway.
- 168 more Nazca Lines were announced to have been identified by a joint Japanese-Peruvian team, bringing the total discovered to 358.
- A Roman pantheon is discovered in the Netherlands, in Zevenaar.

== Events ==
June

- Chickens were first tempted down from trees by rice at Neolithic Ban Non Wat in central Thailand, research suggests.
- 10 – A wreck located in 2007 off the Norfolk coast of England by divers is disclosed to be HMS Gloucester which ran aground on a sandbank in 1682 with the future King James II of England on board.

October

- 5/6 – Ancient DNA analysis of Updown Girl, a 7th century Anglo-Saxon child burial in south-east England discovered in 1989, indicates that she has West African ancestry in her paternal line, it is announced.

November

- 28 – The Horniman Museum in London formally returns ownership of the Benin Bronzes from its collection to Nigeria.

== Deaths ==
- January 2 – Richard Leakey, Kenyan palaeoanthropologist (b. 1944)
- February 4 – Neil Faulkner, British archaeologist (b. 1958)
- February 19 – Sergei Beletzkiy, Russian archaeologist and historian (b. 1953)
- November 3 – Lisa Lodwick, British archaeologist (b. 1988)
- December 8 – Peder Mortensen, Danish archaeologist (b. 1934)

== See also ==
- List of years in archaeology
