= Monte Cetona =

Mountain in Italy

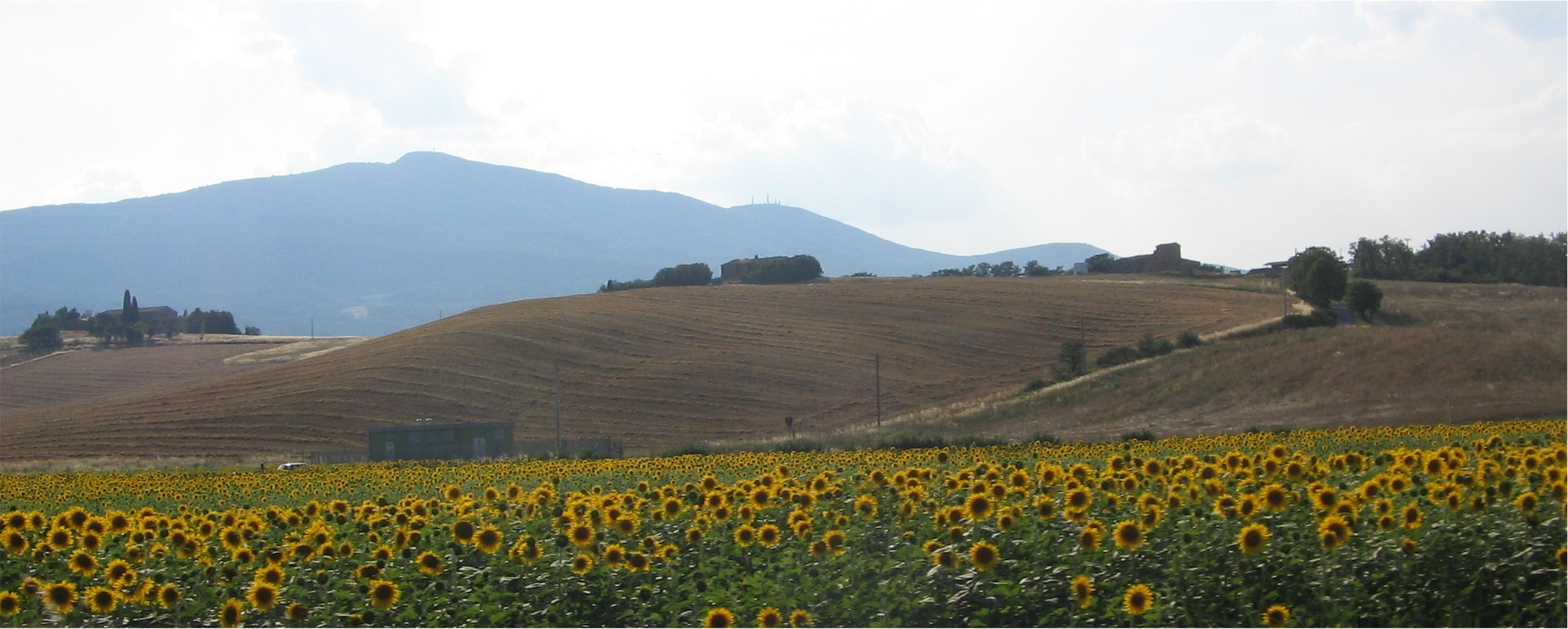
- Overall view

Highest point
- Elevation: 1,148 m (3,766 ft)
- Prominence: 551 m (1,808 ft)
- Isolation: 21.13 km (13.13 mi)
- Coordinates: 42°55′48″N 11°52′33″E

Geography
- Location within Italy
- Location: Tuscany, Italy
- Parent range: Tuscan Antiapennines

Geology
- Mountain type: limestone.

The Monte Cetona is a mountain located in the southern Tuscany region of Italy.

== Features ==
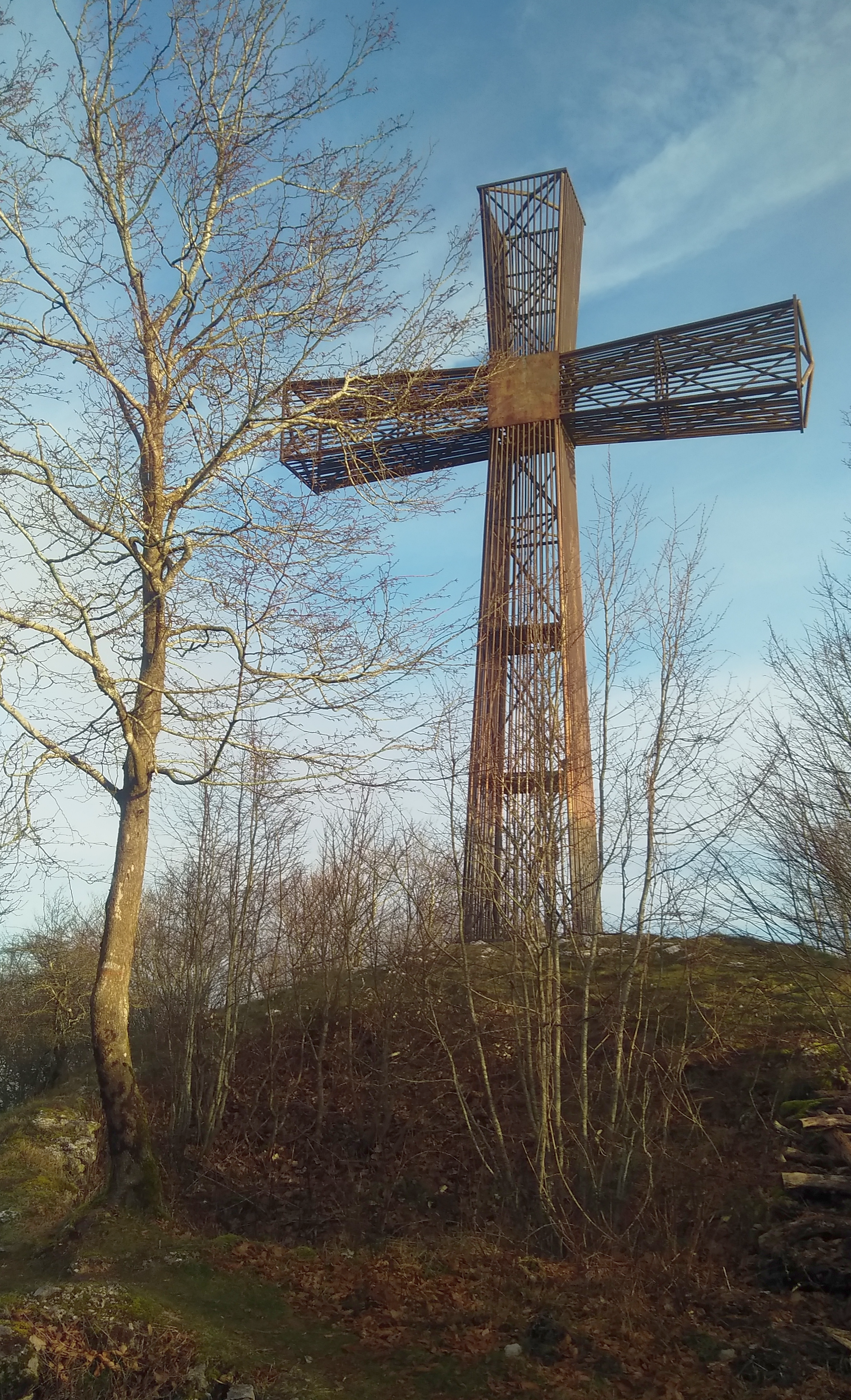
Summit cross

The mountain stands near the SE border of the province of Siena and closes the long, hilly ridge which divides val d'Orcia from val di Chiana. It belongs to the comuni of Cetona, San Casciano dei Bagni, Radicofani and Sarteano. On its SW slopes, on Poggio Gello, is located the spring of the river Orcia, while downstream of the mountain, South of the summit, stands the lago di San Casciano.

Not far from the summit there are several transmission masts whose broadcasts, due to the prominence and isolation of the mountain, can reach the areas of Perugia, Orvieto and Arezzo. The Monte Cetona belongs to a S.C.I. also named Monte Cetona (code IT5190012), which covers an area of 1604 ha.

=== Summit cross ===
On the mountain top stands a high metallic summit cross, built in 1967. It was realised to replace smaller crosses settled there after the II World War. The realization of the project was promoted in 1965 by the parishes of the Diocese of Chiusi, after the return of the local bishop from Rome, where he took part in the Second Vatican Council. It was officially inaugurated on October the 1st of the same year by Brunetto Bucciarelli-Ducci, former president of the Italian Camera dei Deputati. The lighting system was turned on for the first time on June 29, 1968, at 9 o'clock in the evening, via radio control, by Pope Paul VI. The cross is 10 metres wide, and 15 metres high, and its weight is 6.200 tonnes.

== Geology ==
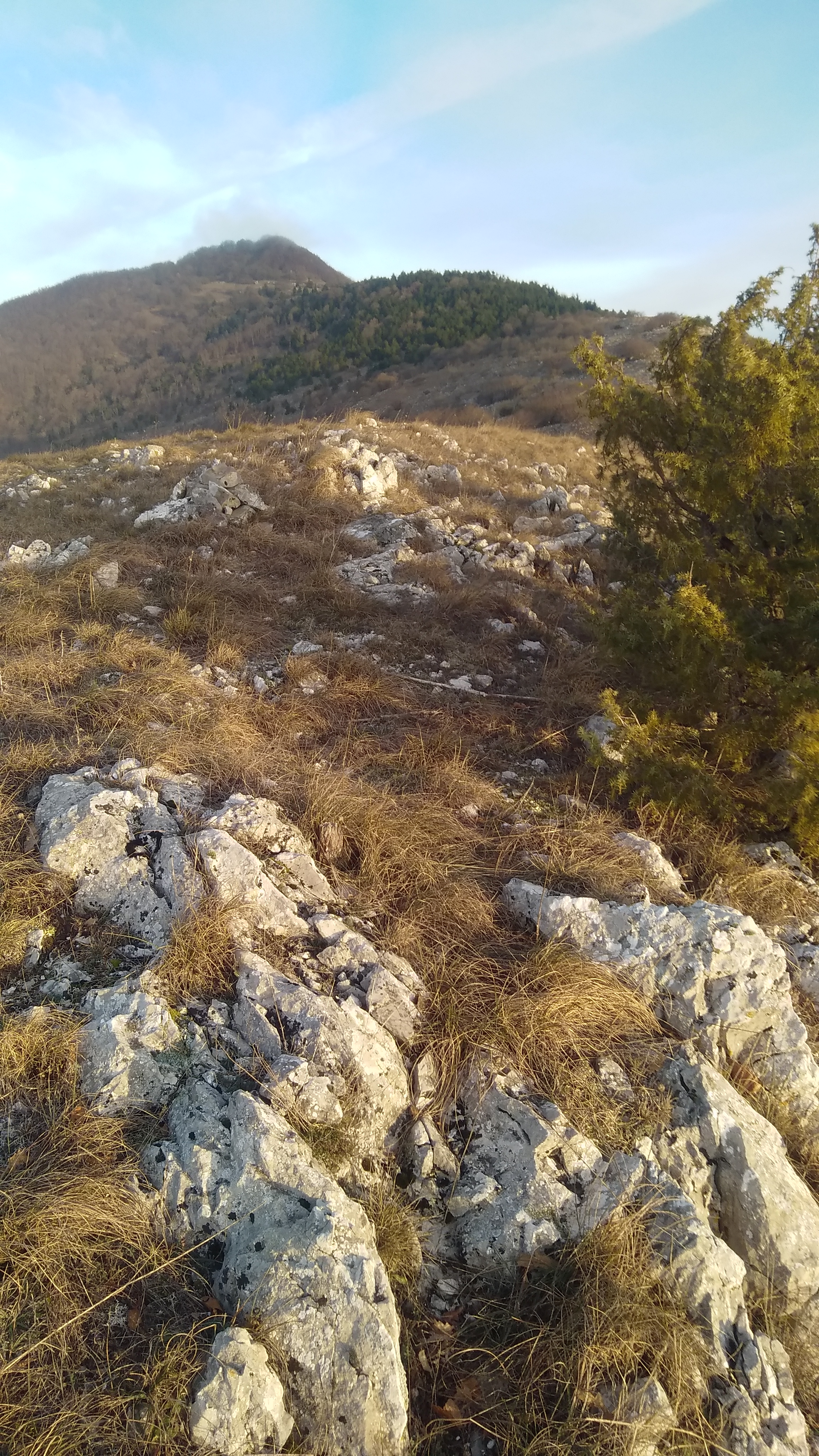
Limestone outcrops on the southern ridge

Both the slopes of Monte Cetona facing Val d'Orcia and Val di Chiana are covered by sands and clays up to about 800 metres of elevation. In the uppermost part of the mountain emerges the rocky substrate of a Karstic origin. The summit is partially made of dolomite. North of it some caves can be found. Among them are well known the Grotte del Belvedere (Belvedere caves), opened into the travertine and that were frequented by human beings during the prehistory.

== Access to the summit ==
The summit of Monte Cetona can be reached following several hiking itineraries. Can be mentioned the one starting from Camporsevoli (a small village in the comune of Cetona), which crosses the Valle Saccaia (Sacciaia Valley) and then climbs the Southern ridge up to the summit, and the one starting from Fonte Vetriana, on the W slopes of the mountain.
