= Trevinano =

- Frazione
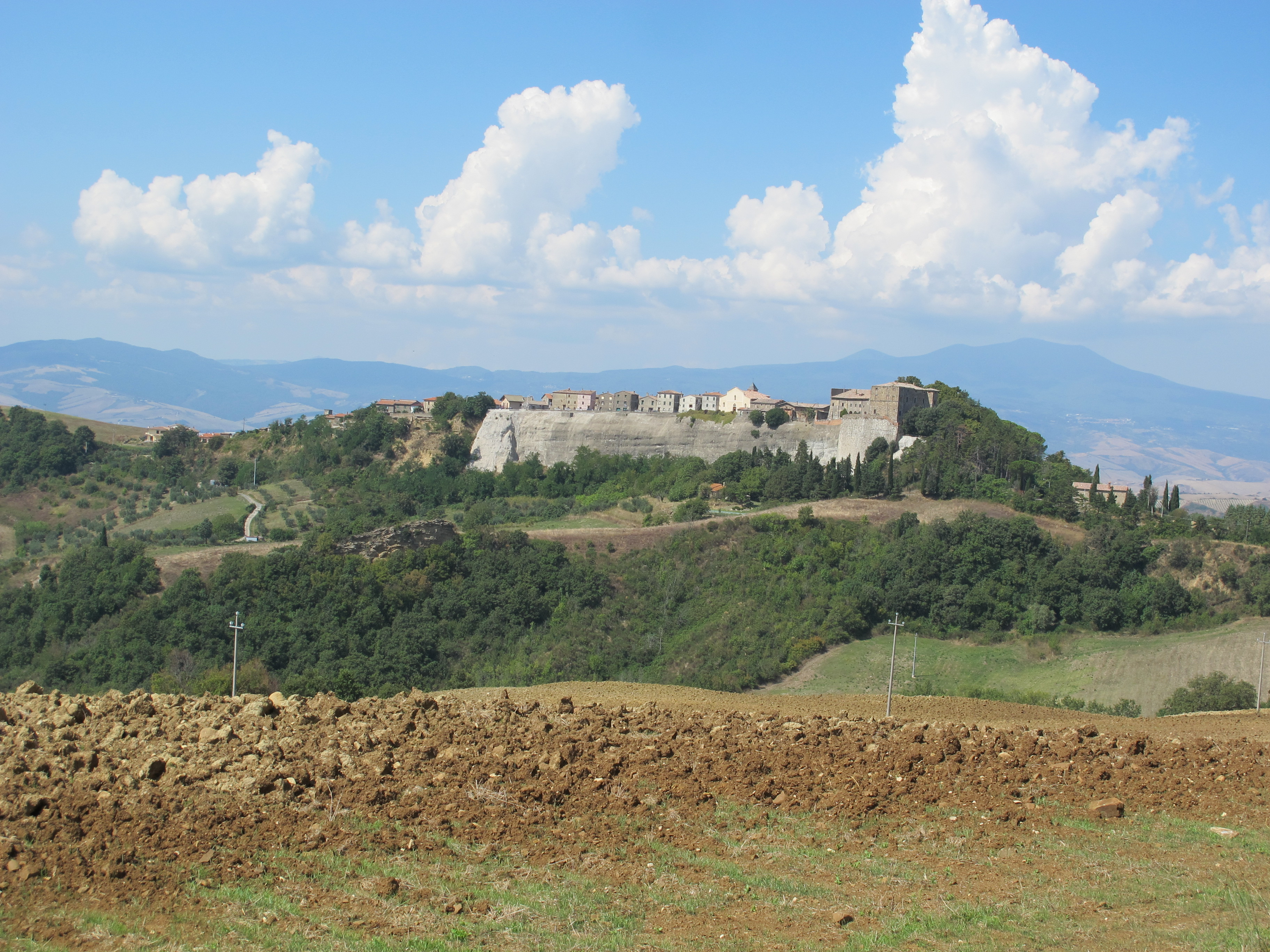

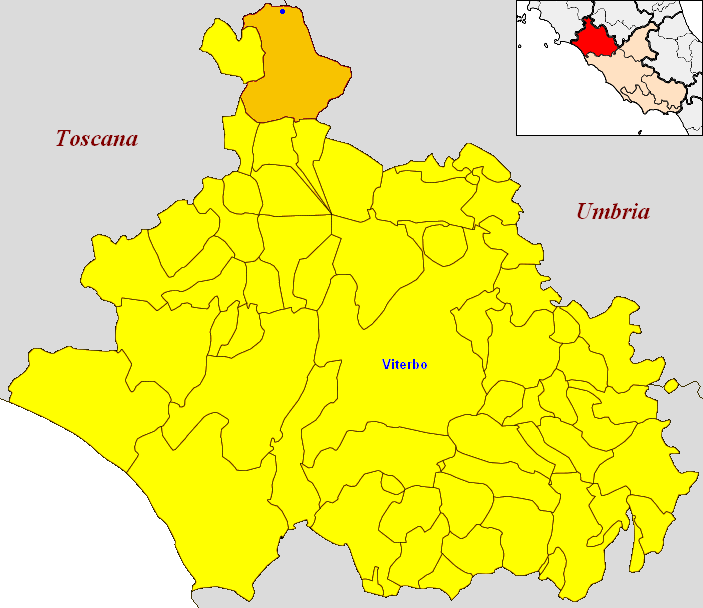
- Trevinano (blue spot) within the municipality of Acquapendente (orange) and the province

- Location of Trevinano in Italy
- Coordinates: 42°49′22.01″N 11°52′14.16″E
- Country: Italy
- Region: Lazio
- Province: Viterbo (VT)
- Comune: Acquapendente
- Elevation: 619 m (2,031 ft)

Population (2011)
  - Total: 142
- Demonym: Trevinanesi
- Time zone: UTC+1 (CET)
  - Summer (DST): UTC+2 (CEST)
- Postal code: 01021
- Dialing code: (+39) 0763
- Website: Trevinano info website

Trevinano is an Italian village, frazione of Acquapendente, in the Province of Viterbo, northern Lazio. As of 2011, its population was of 142.

== History ==
The village was part of a territory anciently settled by the Etruscans. Between 1500 and 1800 it was an autonomous municipality, not part of Acquapendente.

== Geography ==
Located upon a hill near the borders of Lazio with the province of Siena (Tuscany) and Terni (Umbria), Trevinano is the northernmost settlement of its region. It is situated near the Tuscan Lake of San Casciano, in the nearby municipality of San Casciano dei Bagni (9 km far). It is 12 km far from Allerona, 14 from Acquapendente, 30 from Orvieto, 33 from Bolsena and 65 from Viterbo.

Near the village flows a little river named Rio Tirolle and in the east of it is located the Monte Rufeno Natural Reserve.

== Main sights ==
- The medieval Boncompagni-Ludovisi Castle, first mentioned in the 11th century.
- Our Lady of the Oak Church (Madonna della Quercia), built in the 16th century.
- The parish church of Our Lady under the Mystery of Nativity (Madonna Santissima sotto il Mistero della Natività).

== Films ==
- Tucci in Italy, Season 1, Episode 5 (2025)

== Gallery ==
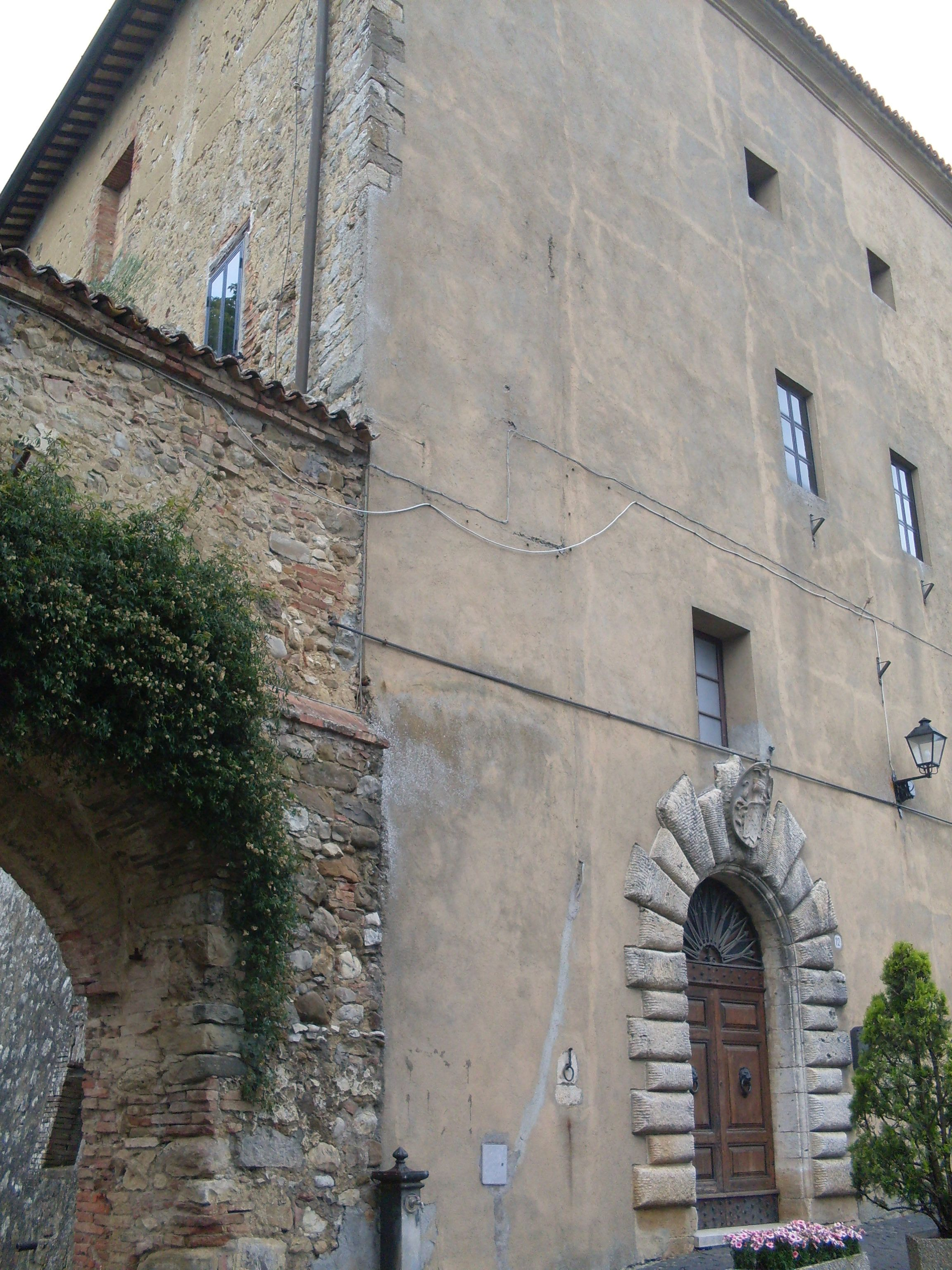
The Castle of Trevinano (1)

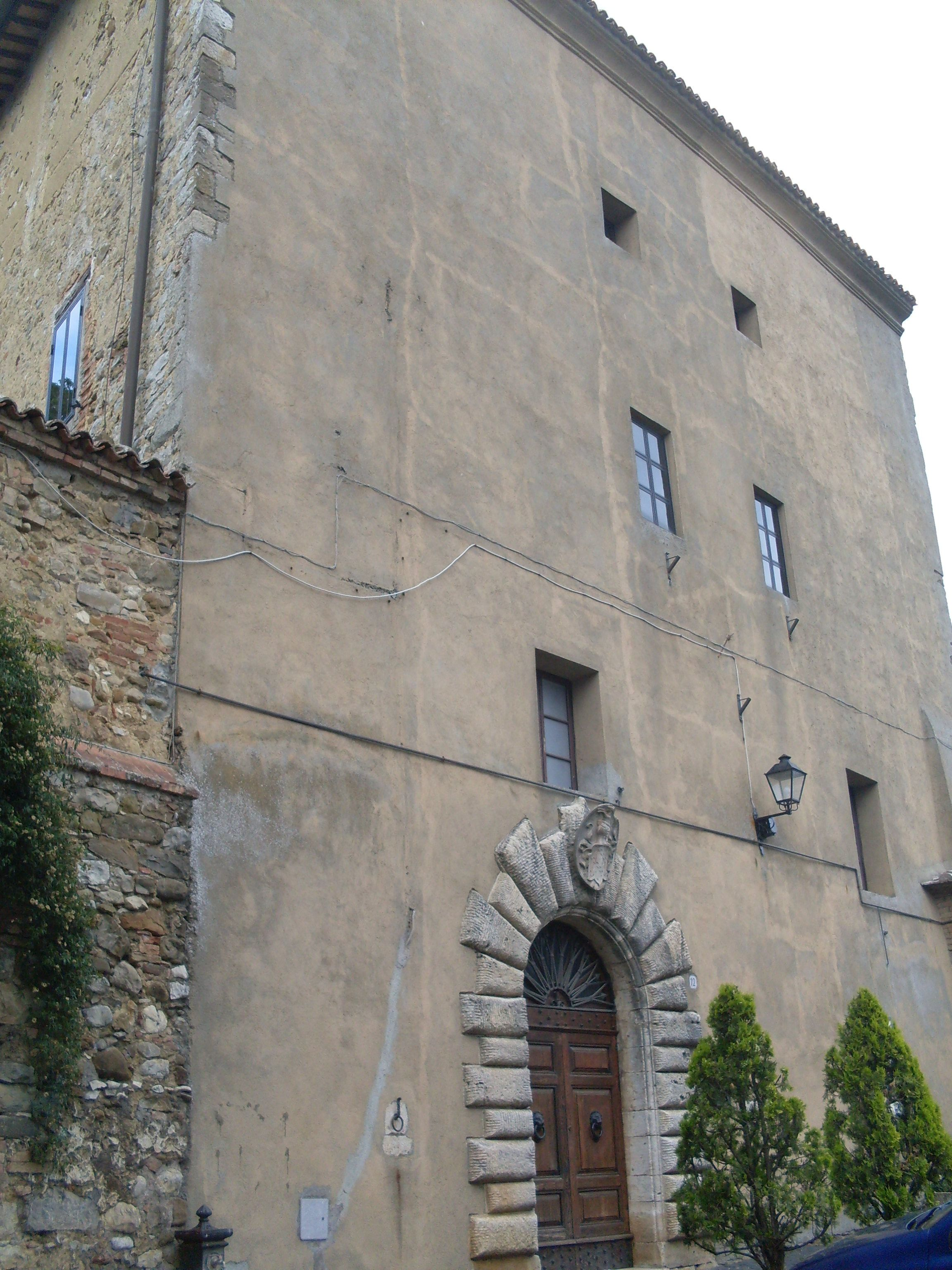
The Castle of Trevinano (2)
