= Piazze, Cetona =

Piazze
- Frazione
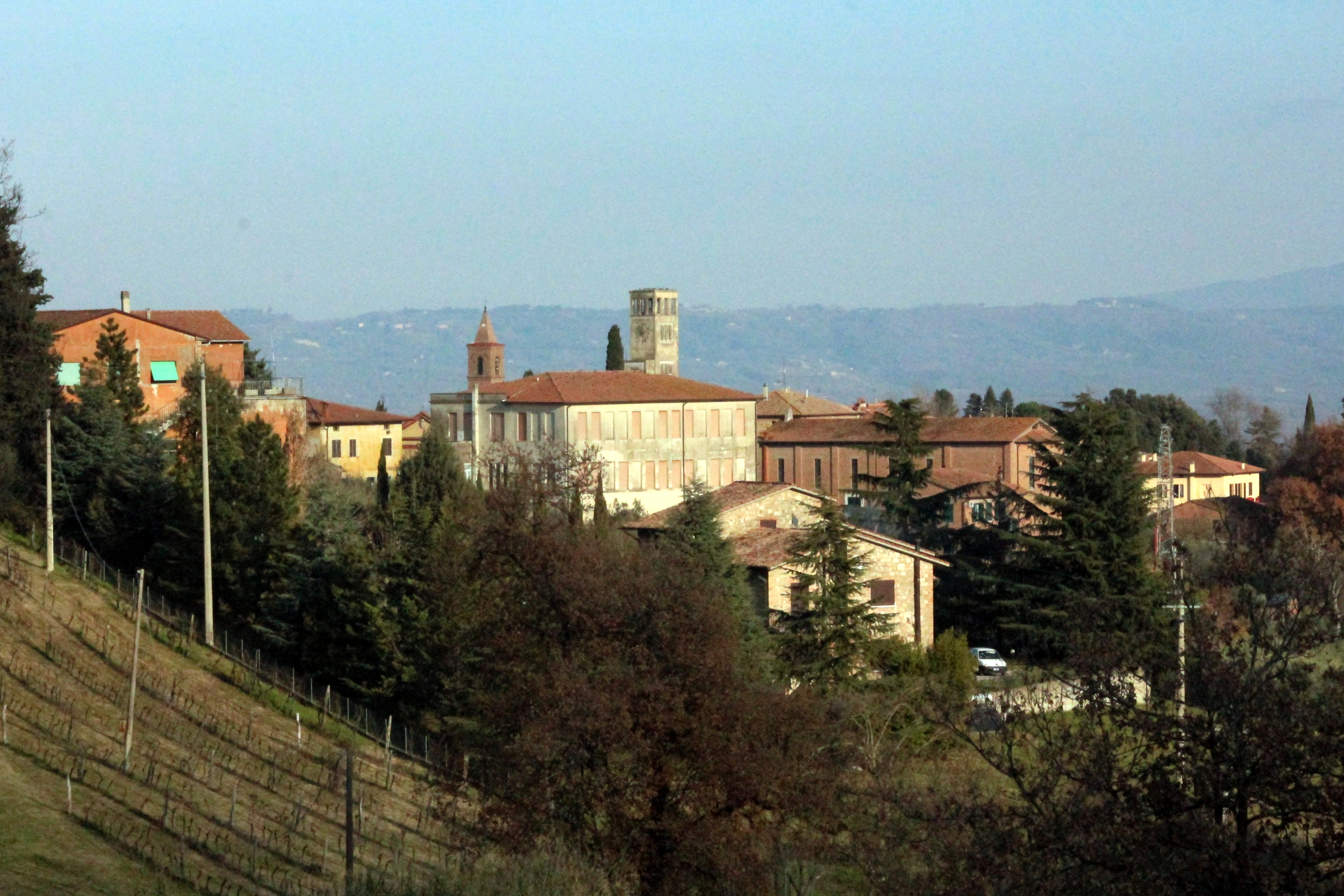
- View of Piazze

- Location of Piazze in Italy
- Coordinates: 42°54′27″N 11°55′00″E
- Country: Italy
- Region: Tuscany
- Province: Siena (SI)
- Comune: Cetona
- Elevation: 399 m (1,309 ft)

Population (2011)
  - Total: 704
- Demonym: Piazzesi / Piazzaioli
- Time zone: UTC+1 (CET)
  - Summer (DST): UTC+2 (CEST)

Piazze is a village in Tuscany, central Italy, administratively a frazione of the comune of Cetona, province of Siena. At the time of the 2001 census its population was 724.

Piazze is about 92 km from Siena and 9 km from Cetona.
