= Bureij mosaic =

Byzantine-era artwork discovered 2022 in Gaza Strip, Palestine

Coordinates: 31°25′56″N 34°24′49″E

The Bureij mosaic is a Byzantine-era mosaic floor discovered under an olive orchard in the Bureij refugee camp in the Gaza Strip, Palestine in 2022. It was part of a Byzantine church, and the mosaic was likely created between AD 390 and 634–636. It is described as a "sprawling grid" with cartouches containing 17 animals, including geese, ducks, dogs, insects, goats, deer, and an octopus. There are also geometric patterns and a border depicting a vine. The mosaic underlies a 500-square-metre (5,400 sq ft) area from which three sections of earth have already been removed, with more remaining to be excavated.

Farmer Salman al-Nabahin found the mosaic when he began investigating why his trees were not rooting properly. The French Biblical and Archaeological School of Jerusalem is assisting with the excavation. Archaeologist Rene Elter reported that the mosaic was in a "perfect state of conservation". Further research is needed to determine whether the mosaic floor was installed in a private villa, a religious structure, or for some other purpose.

The archaeological site is inaccessible due to the Israeli invasion of the Gaza Strip, and researchers are dependent on satellite imagery to monitor changes. A report compiling information collected between June and September 2024 noted that the site had been bulldozed and it is likely that such activity has damaged archaeological deposits close to the surface.

== See also ==
- Early Byzantine mosaics in the Middle East
- 2022 in archaeology
- Destruction of cultural heritage during the Gaza war
- List of archaeological sites in the Gaza Strip
