= Celle sul Rigo =

- Frazione
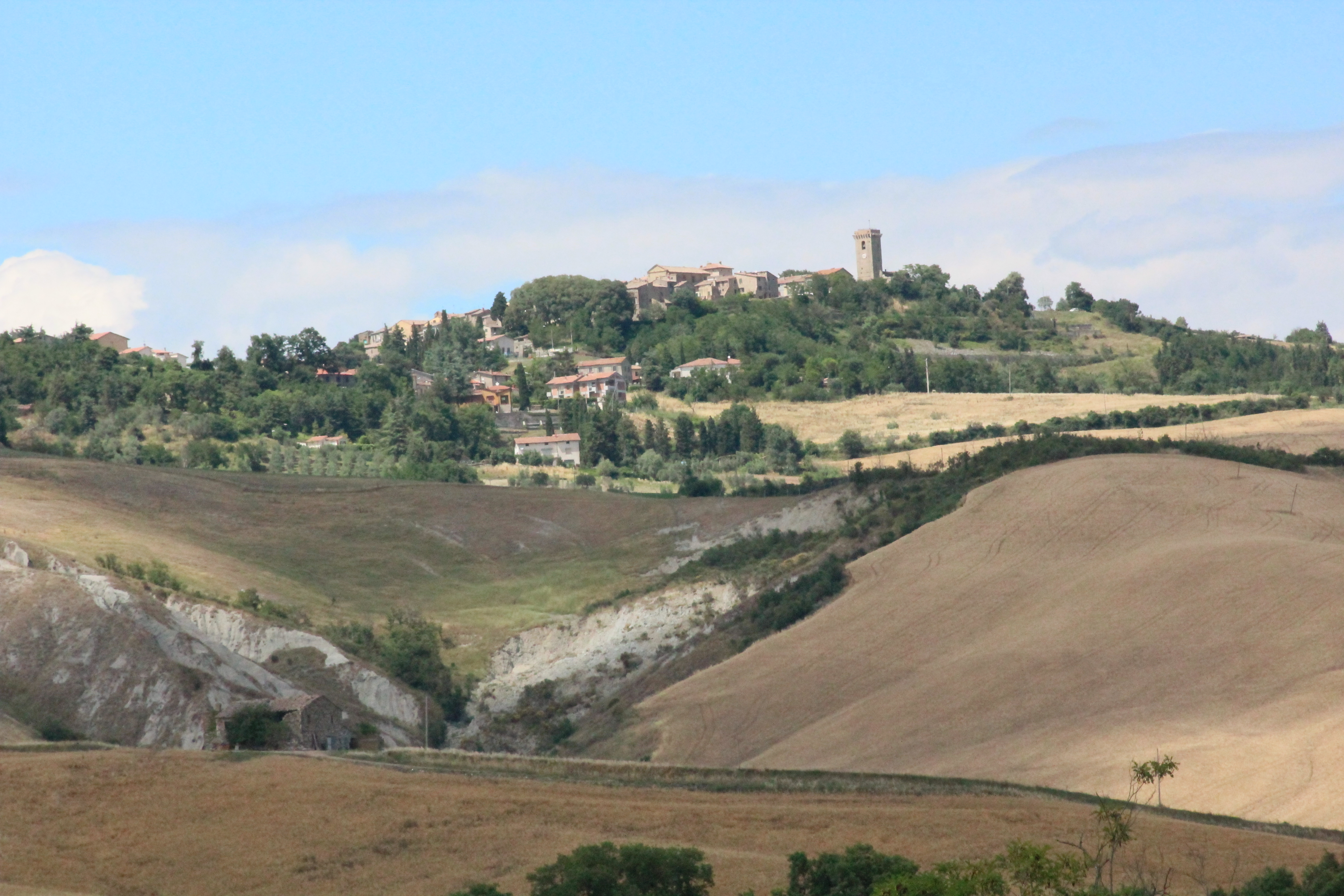
- View of Celle sul Rigo

- Location of Celle sul Rigo in Italy
- Coordinates: 42°51′45″N 11°49′18″E
- Country: Italy
- Region: Tuscany
- Province: Siena (SI)
- Comune: San Casciano dei Bagni
- Elevation: 598 m (1,962 ft)

Population (2011)
  - Total: 353
- Demonym: Cellesi
- Time zone: UTC+1 (CET)
  - Summer (DST): UTC+2 (CEST)

Celle sul Rigo is a village in Tuscany, central Italy, administratively a frazione of the comune of San Casciano dei Bagni, province of Siena. At the time of the 2001 census its population was 377.

Celle sul Rigo is about 80 km from Siena and 6 km from San Casciano dei Bagni.
