= Palazzone =

- Frazione
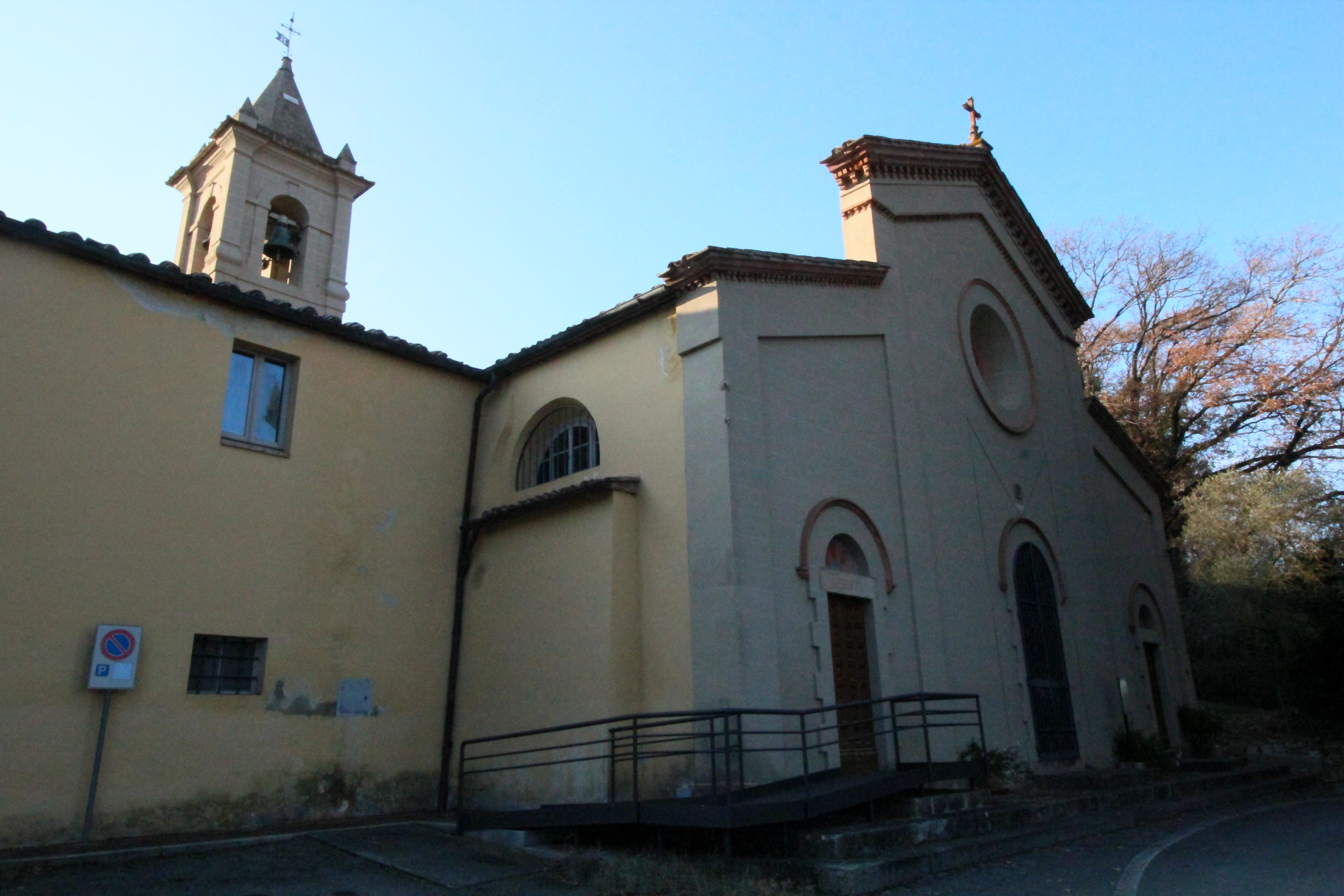
- The church of Santa Maria Assunta in Palazzone

- Location of Palazzone in Italy
- Coordinates: 42°52′59″N 11°55′59″E
- Country: Italy
- Region: Tuscany
- Province: Siena (SI)
- Comune: San Casciano dei Bagni
- Elevation: 408 m (1,339 ft)

Population (2011)
  - Total: 316
- Demonym: Palazzonesi
- Time zone: UTC+1 (CET)
  - Summer (DST): UTC+2 (CEST)

Palazzone is a village in Tuscany, central Italy, administratively a frazione of the comune of San Casciano dei Bagni, province of Siena. At the time of the 2001 census its population was 310.

Palazzone is about 102 km from Siena and 11 km from San Casciano dei Bagni.
