= Sergei Beletzkiy =

Russian archaeologist and historian (1953–2022)

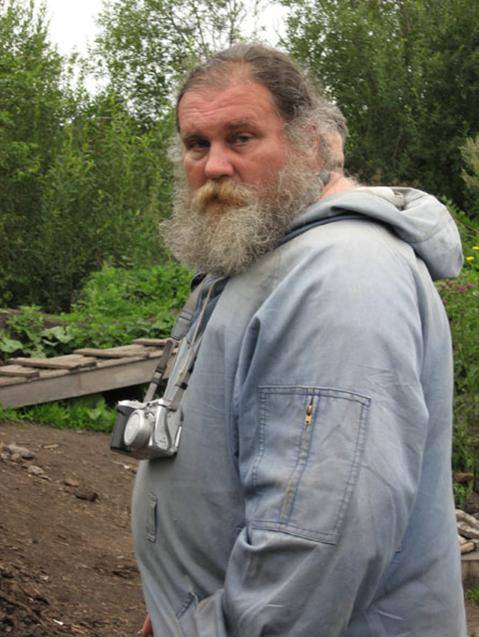
Sergei Beletsky

Sergei Vasilevich Beletsky Сергей Васильевич Белецкий (21 August 1953 Leningrad, USSR – 19 February 2022 Saint Petersburg, Russia) was a Russian archaeologist and historian. He was a Doctor of Historical Sciences and Leading Researcher of the Department of Slavic-Finnish Archeology for the Institute of the History of Material Culture of the USSR Academy of Sciences (RAS).

== Biography ==
Beletsky was born on 21 August 1953 in Leningrad, to Vasily Dmitrievich Beletsky and Alexandra Semyonovna Kostsova, Beletsky graduated from the Faculty of History of the Saint Petersburg State University in the Department of Archeology in 1976.

From 1970 to 1971, Beletsky worked at the Hermitage Museum, in the workshop for the restoration of monumental painting. From 1979 to 1989 he worked in the department of archaeological vaults of the Institute of Archeology of the Russian Academy of Sciences, since 1989 - at the Institute of the History of Material Culture of the Academy of Sciences of the USSR (RAS) and at the Department of Museum Studies at Saint-Petersburg State University of Culture and Arts.

He died from complications of COVID-19 in Saint Petersburg on 19 February 2022, at the age of 68.
