= Bronzes of San Casciano dei Bagni =

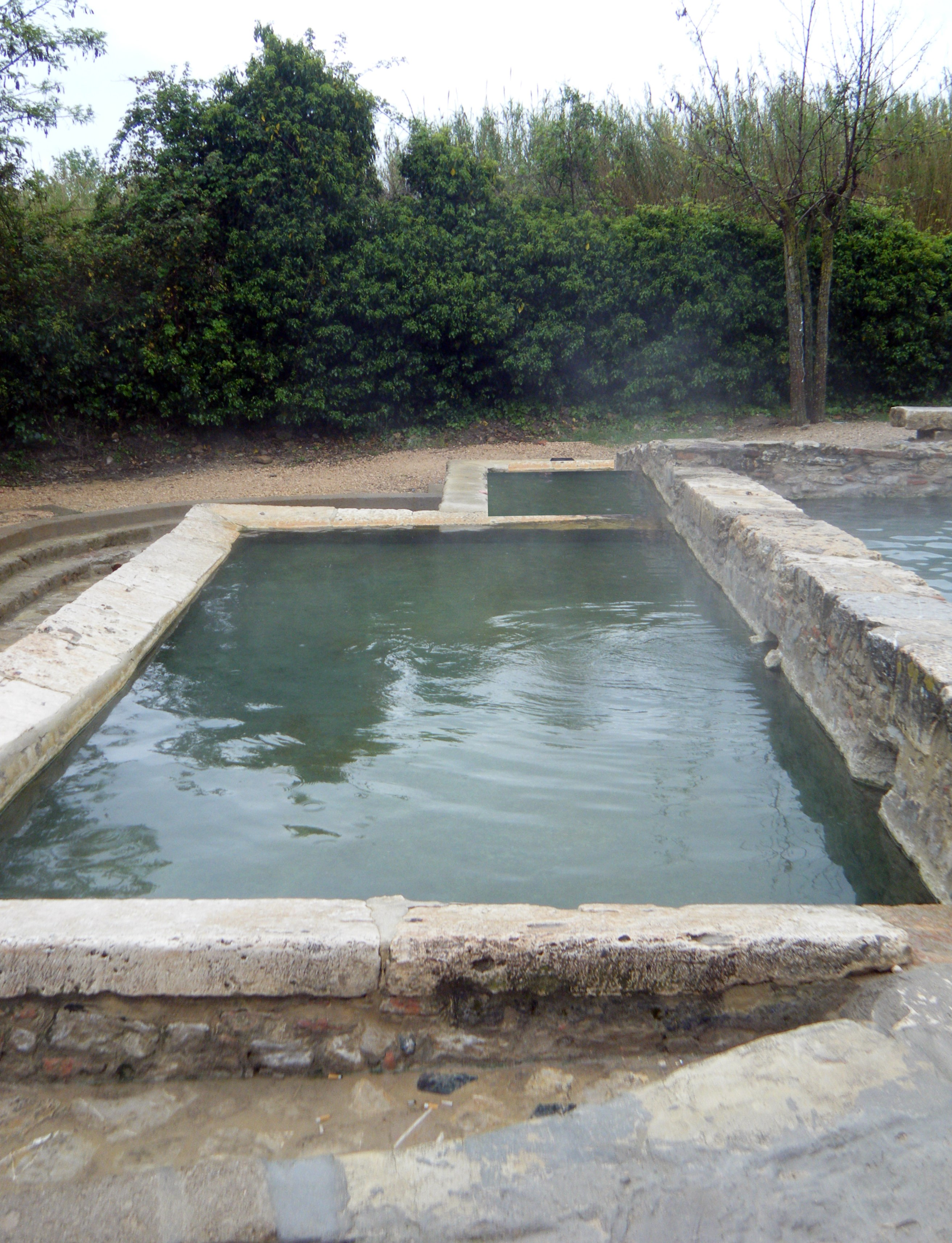
Modern pool with hot water, San Casciano Dei Bagni

In 2022, 24 ancient bronze statues were discovered in San Casciano dei Bagni in Italy. They are regarded as one of the most important archaeological discoveries of 2023 (albeit discovered one year before). Votive offerings and over 6000 coins have also been discovered at the site.

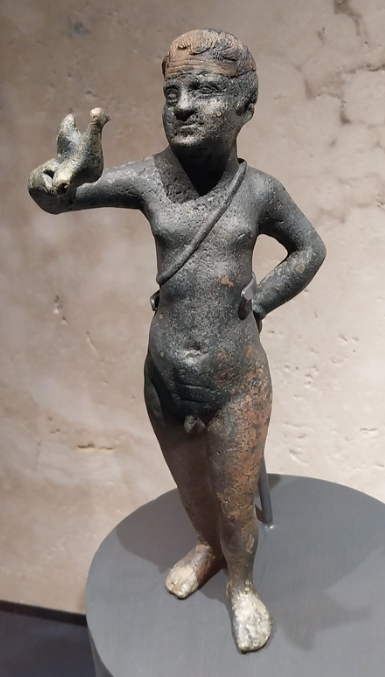
Statuette of a boy

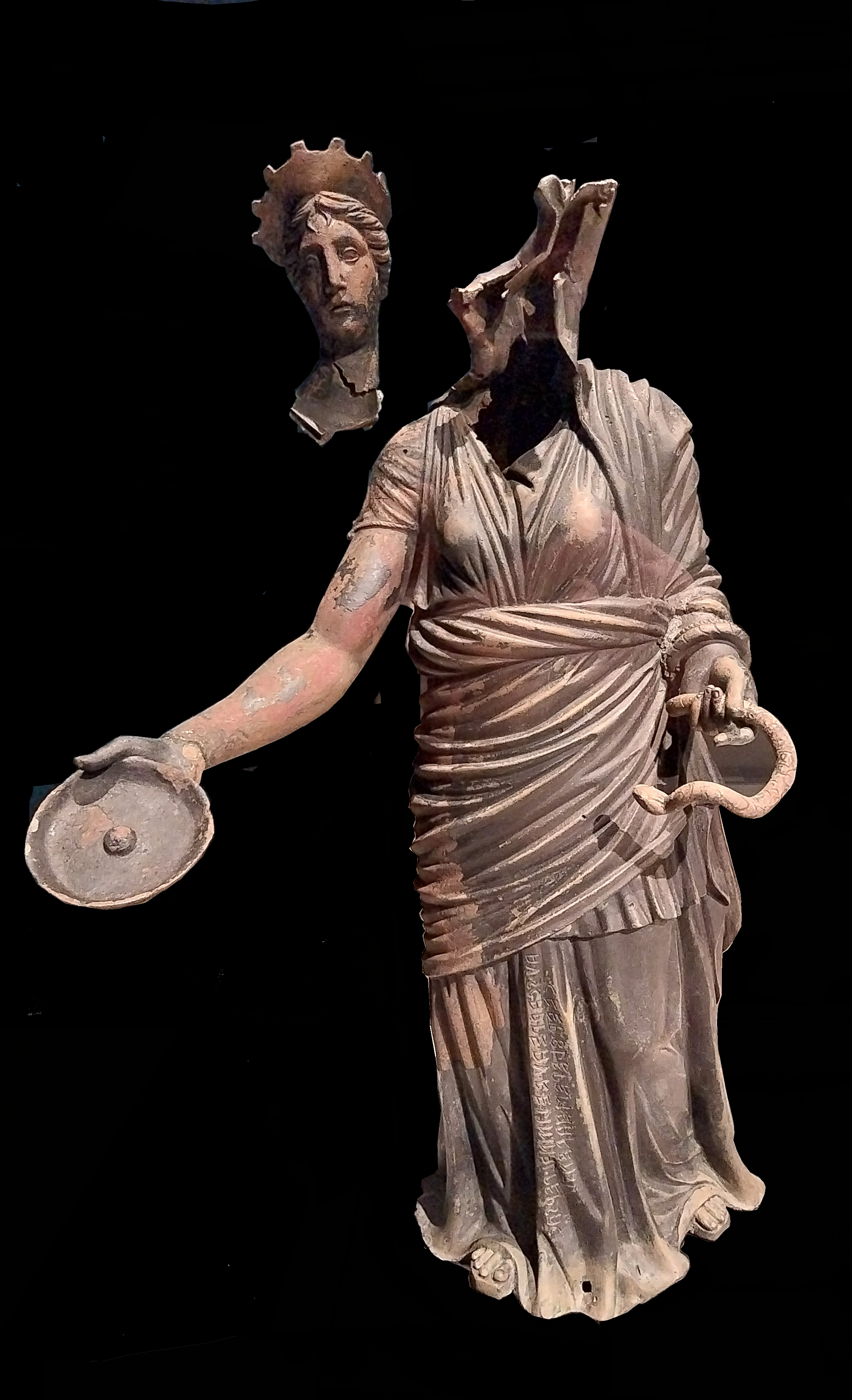
Statue of a woman

Recent archaeological excavations in the bath started in 2018. The bath was part of a sanctuary that was originally built by the Etruscans at a hot water spring and later extended under the Romans into a spa complex. The sanctuary was in use until the end of the fourth century. It consisted of a temple-like structure with two columns and a bath behind. The complex was adorned with marble statues. The largest of these (now missing its head) was an Apollo of the Sauroktonos type, a standing nude figure holding a lizard. Lizards were regarded as healers for eye problems, so this statue represents the god as healer. The spring is still used today and was renovated several times over the last centuries. Its ancient name was Flere Havens and is mentioned on the inscriptions of altars and statues found. It is also the name of the spring goddess. Fortuna Primigenia and Apollo were the gods that protected the spring. They are mentioned on altar inscriptions as well as on the bronzes found. Many of the bronzes found there show body parts or even the viscera, those body parts that got ill and should have been cured. Many inscription on these bronzes are in Etruscan and Latin and provide the names and origin of the people that came here to be cured. The bronzes were most likely made by local artists.

== Remarkable bronzes ==
- One striking figure shows one half of a male body split in the middle. Only the genitals are complete. The statue evidently showed that body part that needed healing. Similar examples are so far only known in terracotta. An inscriptions names Gaius Rosciius as donor.
- The largest bronze statue found shows Apollo as an archer, made around 100 BC. The god is depicted naked with his hands once holding a bow and an arrow (both gone now) in the position to shoot.
- Several statues bear inscriptions in Etruscan. One head was dedicated by Aule Marcni Clantisa. A second head was dedicated by Nufre, son of Aule. He most likley came from the Nufrzna family that was based in the Etruscan town of Perusia.
- One statue shows a naked man, with very slender arms and a malformed foot. It has been suggested that this shows an ill man. The inscription names the donor, who was Etruscan and called Lucious Marcius Grabillo. The text mentions also the donation of six further statues and six legs to the spring. Lucious Marcius Grabillo evidently suffered from foot or leg problems.
- A statuette from the 2nd century BC shows a child, wearing a tunic and holding a ball. The gender of the figure is unclear: the short hair points to a boy, but the jewellery worn rather points to a girl. An Etruscan inscription says that its donor was Arnth Fastntru from Chiusi.
- The statue of a woman dates to the second half of the second century BC. It is about one meter in height, that equals exactly three Roman feet. The head was found detached and deformed by a stone. In one hand she is holding a bowl for libations and in the other a snake. There is a dedication inscription in Etruscan. According to the text, the statue was dedicated by Aule Scarpe, son of Aule and by a woman from the Velimnei family from Perugia to Flere Havens, the name of the hot spring but also the deity of the hot spring who is most likely represented in this statue.
- Eight bronzes show tightly swaddled babies. One of them wears an amulet in shape of a crescent. These are typical for protection of children. The figures are evidence for bringing health and well being for infants.

== Literature ==
- Massimo Osanna and Jacopo Tabolli (eds) (2025)ː The bronzes from San Casciano dei Bagni : a sensation from the mud : James-Simon-Galerie, Museumsinsel Berlin, 5 July - 12 October 2025 in collaboration with Martin Maischberger and Agnes Schwarzmaier, Antikensammlung, Staatliche Museen zu Berlin, ISBN 9783795490423
