= Bureij =

Bureij Camp
- Refugee Camp

Arabic transcription(s)
  - Arabic: مخيّم البريج
  - Latin: Breij (official) al-Burayj (unofficial)
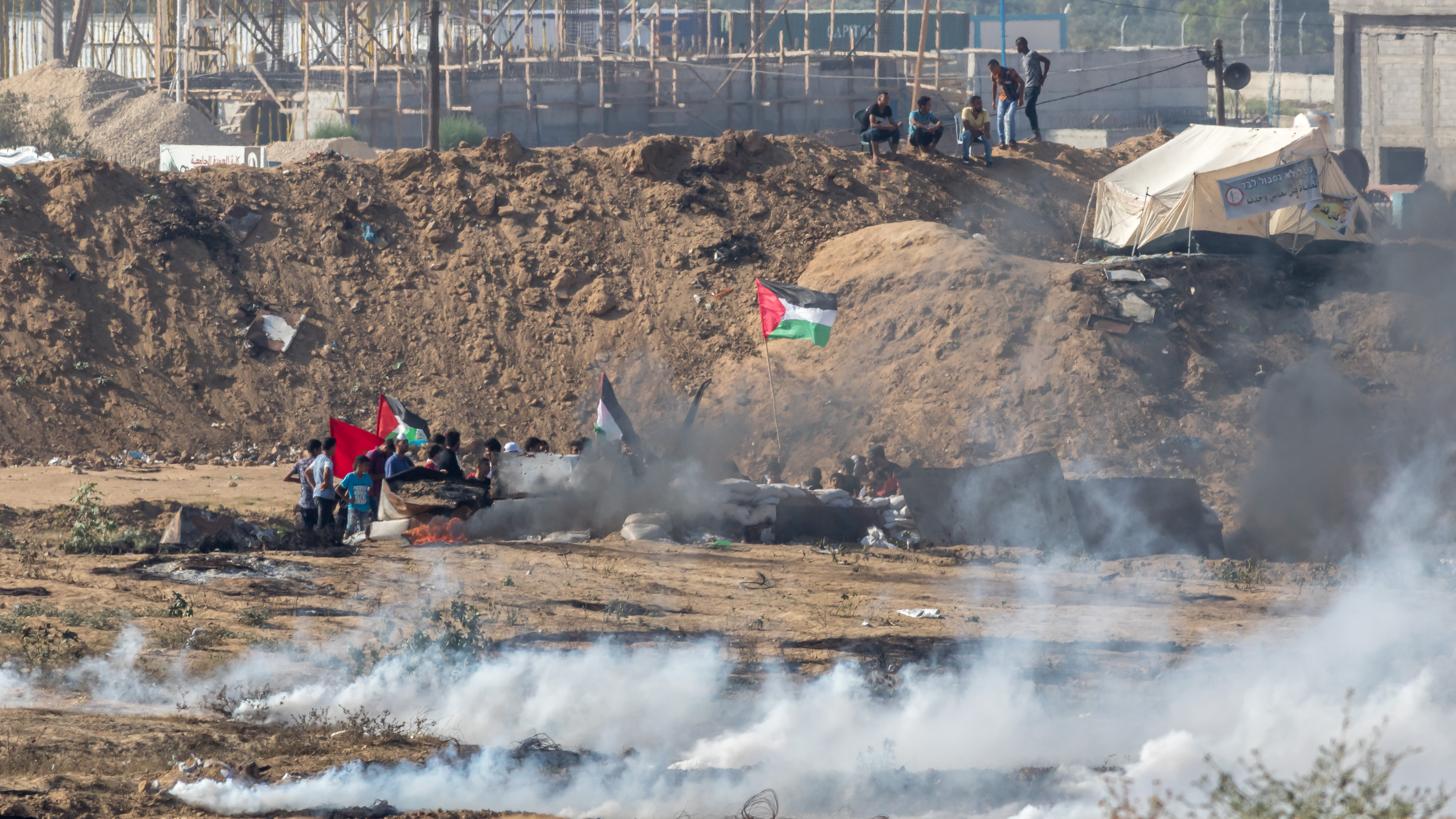
- 2018 Gaza border protests, Bureij

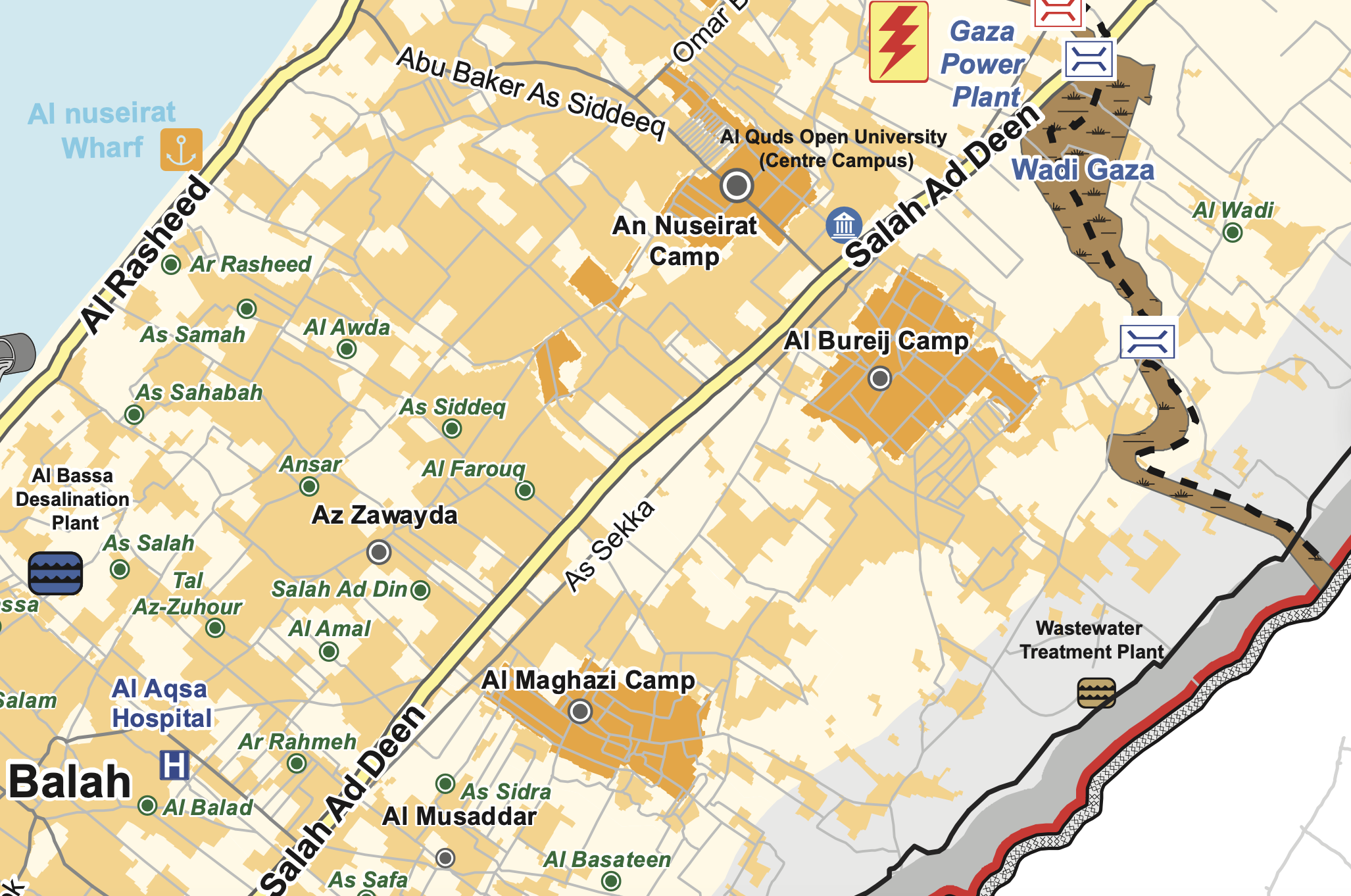
- Map of the camp, as well as the two other adjacent camps of Nuseirat and Maghazi

- Location of Bureij Camp within Palestine
- Coordinates: 31°26′22.31″N 34°24′10.58″E
- State: State of Palestine
- Governorate: Deir al-Balah

Government
  - Type: Refugee Camp (from 1949)

Area
  - Total: 0.5 km^{2} (0.19 sq mi)

Population (2017)
  - Total: 43,515
  - Density: 87,000/km^{2} (230,000/sq mi)
- Population total includes both the population of the camp and the Bureij municipality

Bureij (Arabic: البريج) is a Palestinian refugee camp located in the central Gaza Strip east of the Salah al-Din Road in the Deir al-Balah Governorate. The camp's total land area is 529 dunums and in 2017, it had a population of 28,024 with 28,770 registered refugees. The Palestinian Central Bureau of Statistics (PCBS) 2017 census listed a population of 15,491 in the surrounding Bureij municipality apart from the camp population.

The camp was established in 1949 with a population of 13,000 Palestinians from the broader Gaza area. A small percentage of the refugees were housed in the British army barracks but the bulk of them were housed in tents. The UNRWA built concrete homes in 1950 to replace the tents.

Most of the refugees today, like those in most camps in the Gaza Strip today, live in densely populated buildings. The camp does not have a sewage system and most waste accumulates in the Wadi Gaza, a stream north of the camp, and as a result poses a health hazard. Most of the camp's water comes from an Israeli water company.

Bureij has six primary and two secondary schools with a population of 9,306 pupils at the end of 2004. All schools are operated by the UNRWA.

== Incidents in the Israeli–Palestinian conflict ==
According to a UN report, on the night of 28 August 1953 bombs were thrown through the windows of huts in Bureij where refugees were sleeping and, as they fled, they were attacked by small arms and automatic weapons. According to Gelber, after one month of Unit 101 starting training "a patrol of the unit [] infiltrated into the Gaza Strip as an exercise, encountered [Palestinians] in al-Bureij refugee camp, opened fire to rescue itself and left behind about 30 killed Arabs and dozens of wounded." According to Bishara 43 Palestinian civilians with seven women amongst them were killed, and 22 wounded. The Mixed Armistice Commission report put the total at 20 killed, 27 seriously wounded, and 35 less seriously wounded. Unit 101 suffered two wounded soldiers. Ariel Sharon, who had personally led the attack wrote in his report:

"The enemy opened fire on me from the northwest. ... I decided that it was better to pass through the camp and slip out the other side than to go back the way I came, because crops, gardens, barbed wire and guards made it difficult to move in that direction. ... I also decided that offensive action was better than giving the impression that we were attempting to escape... Therefore I invaded the camp with my group."

The raid was heavily condemned by the Mixed Armistice Commission, who called it “an appalling case of deliberate mass murder”, the raid was publicly criticized in the Israeli cabinet by at least one minister. The Mixed Armistice Commission, in an emergency meeting, adopted by a majority vote a resolution according to which the attack was made by a group of armed Israelis. Major General Bennike Chief of Staff of the United Nations Truce Supervision Organization stated that it was "probable in view of the fact that a quarter of the Israel complaints during the preceding four weeks referred to infiltration in this area" that the likely explanation was a "ruthless reprisal raid".

On 22 August 1988, Hani al-Shami from Bureij was killed by Israeli soldiers from the Givati Brigade. Maher Mahmud al-Makadma was shot and killed by IDF troops while painting slogans on 4 October 1989. On 20 September 1990, an Israeli soldier, Amnon Pommerantz, took a wrong turn into Bureij, panicked when stones were thrown, hit and wounded two children in a waggon while reversing, accidentally rammed a mosque and then got out and laid his rifle down and begged for mercy. He had to get back into his vehicle to shield himself from stones, and was knocked unconscious. Three youths doused the car with petrol and set it alight, incinerating Pommeranz. The culprits were identified by photos, and one turned himself in when the Shin Bet kidnapped his 5-year-old brother and threatened to send the boy to a detention camp where he would be raped, unless his elder brother surrendered. In retaliation, a large part of the Bureij camp was bulldozed in a collective punishment measure.

On 11 March 2002, a mass round-up of Palestinians took place when tanks entered the Bureij refugee camp killing two people. An IDF raid on 6 December 2002 by Israeli tanks and helicopter gunships led to 10 people being killed. A UN investigation found that eight of those killed in the attack were unarmed civilians. Of those, two were UN employees. On 6 March 2004 an Israeli raiding force was ambushed and came under fire.

An IDF raid on Bureij refugee camp in July 2007 by approximately 10 tanks and two bulldozers backed by helicopters was ambushed by members of Hamas's armed wing, the Izz ad-Din al-Qassam Brigades killing an IDF soldier. On 6 October 2007, Israeli forces breaking into the eastern part of the camp with the cover of Israeli aircraft led to armed clashes in the camp.

An extrajudicial assassination occurred on 27 February 2008 in the camp. During the Israeli shelling of the Gaza Strip in January 2009 ten people were injured at a UN health centre in the Bureij refugee camp and four people killed with 16 others wounded in a market.

== See also ==
- Bureij mosaic – Byzantine-era artwork discovered 2022 in Gaza Strip, Palestine
- Heba Zagout – Palestinian artist from Bureij
