= Lago di San Casciano =

Lake in Tuscany, Italy

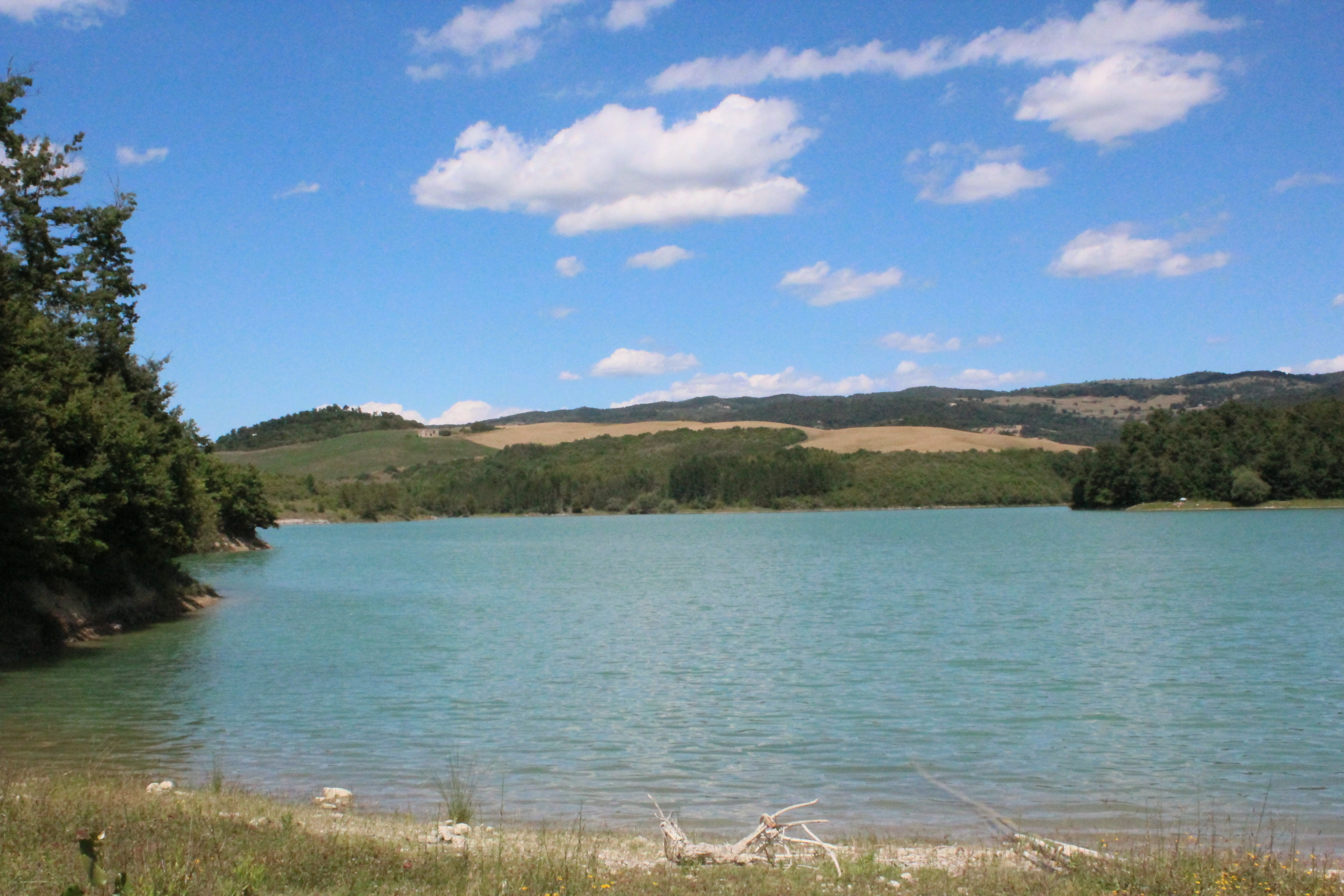

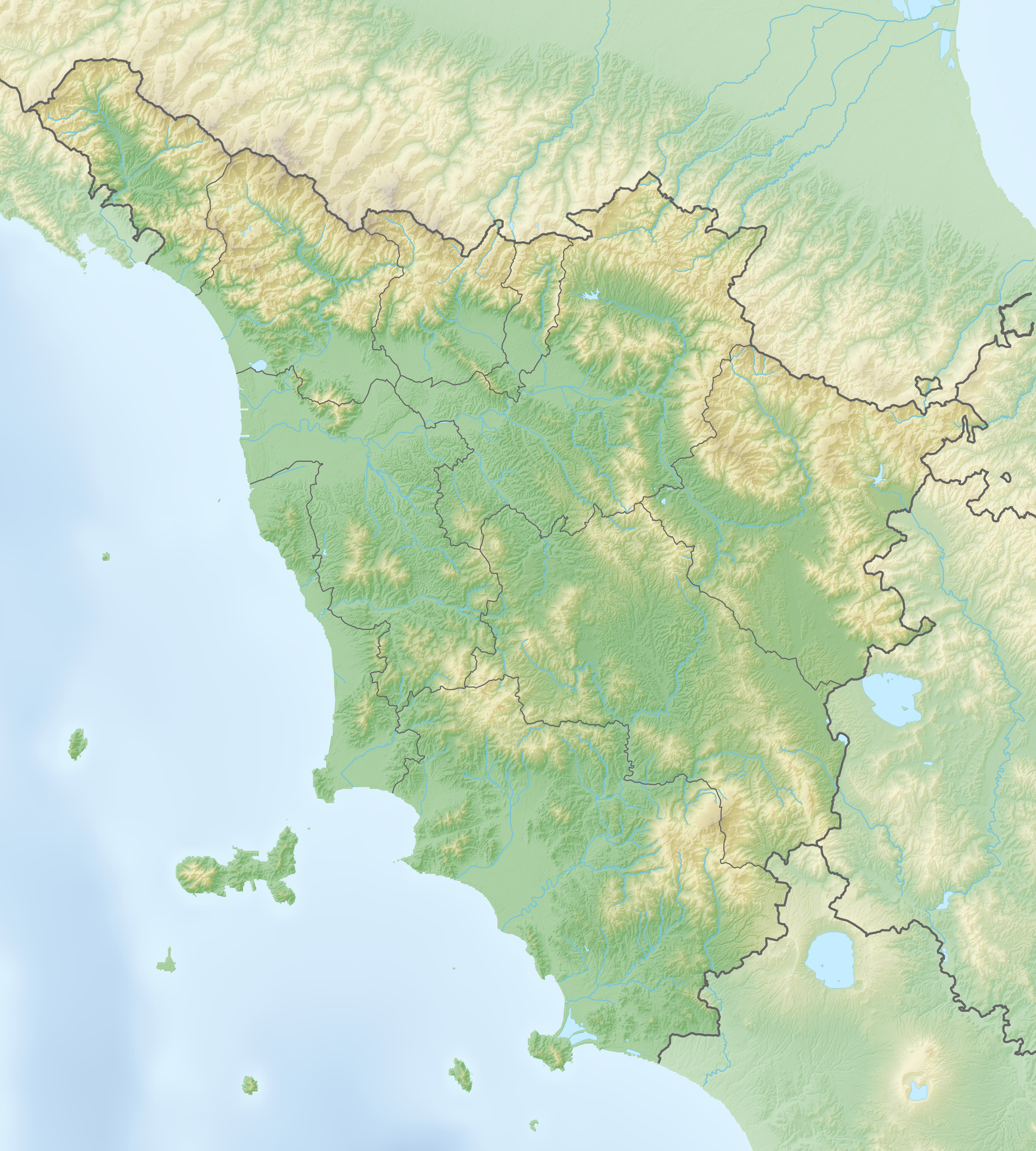
- Location within Tuscany
- Location: San Casciano dei Bagni (SI, Tuscany)
- Coordinates: 42.839771°N 11.849613°E
- Basin countries: Italy
- Surface area: 2 km^{2} (0.77 sq mi)
- Surface elevation: 383 m (1,257 ft)

Lago di San Casciano is a lake in the Province of Siena, Tuscany, Italy. At an elevation of 383 m, its surface area is 2 km^{2}.

== Geography ==
The lake is located in south of the municipality of San Casciano dei Bagni, near the borders with Lazio and the village of Trevinano. It is home to the Elvella Dam.
