= Dungeness Tudor ship =

Preserved 16th-century shipwreck in Kent, England

The Dungeness Tudor ship is a 16th-century ship whose remains were found in 2022 in a quarry at Dungeness, Kent, England.

== Discovery ==
The remains of the ship were found by Cemex workers dredging for aggregate in Denge quarry at Dungeness in April 2022. They were about 8 m (26 ft) below the water level and about 300 m (330 yd) inland from the modern coastline. A large part of the ship's hull was raised intact by the dredgers. The workers immediately contacted Wessex Archaeology, who recorded the find using laser scanning and digital photography, but the discovery was little publicised until the end of the year. The wreck will be reburied under the silt in the lake so that it can be preserved for further investigation by future archaeologists with new techniques.

== Investigation ==
More than 100 timbers from the hull have been found, and dendrochronological analysis dates them to between 1558 and 1580 and identifies them as English oak.

The ship was one of the discoveries shown in BBC Two's Digging for Britain in Series 10, Episode 1, first broadcast on 1 January 2023.
