= Cetona =

- Comune
- Comune di Cetona
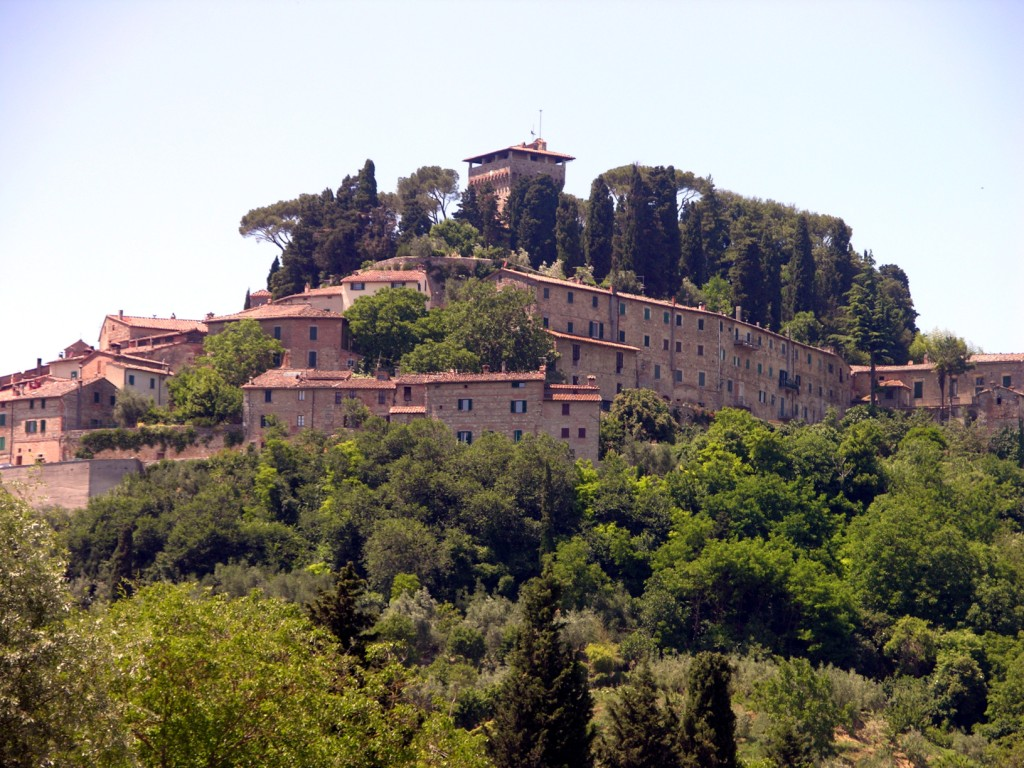

- Coat of arms

- Location within Italy Location within Tuscany
- Coordinates: 42°58′N 11°54′E
- Country: Italy
- Region: Tuscany
- Province: Siena (SI)
- Frazioni: Piazze

Government
  - Mayor: Roberto Cottini

Area
  - Total: 53.57 km^{2} (20.68 sq mi)
- Elevation: 385 m (1,263 ft)

Population (30 June 2017)
  - Total: 2,689
  - Density: 50.20/km^{2} (130.0/sq mi)
- Demonym: Cetonesi
- Time zone: UTC+1 (CET)
  - Summer (DST): UTC+2 (CEST)
- Postal code: 53040
- Dialing code: 0578
- Patron saint: Saint Stephen
- Website: Official website

Cetona is a town and comune in the southern part province of Siena, Tuscany, in an area where Umbria and Lazio meet. It is one of I Borghi più belli d'Italia ("The most beautiful villages of Italy").

The geographical elevation is between 250 metres (820 ft) and the 1,148 metres (3,766 ft) of Monte Cetona itself, at the base of which the town is situated at around 350 metres (1,150 ft).

== History ==
Some of the oldest human settlements of central Italy were discovered at the base of Monte Cetona, such as the early neo-Paleolithic Gosto cave (40–80th century BC) and Lattaia cave (9–10th century BC). The Belverde park hosts 25 prehistoric and Bronze Age caves, such as the San Francesco cave. There are several sites of Etruscan finds.

The town of Cetona developed on the hillside around the rocca fortress, containing a square tower (about 900 AD) and an inner fortress wall. It became known as the Scitonia castle. In the first mention of the comune, at the end of the 11th century, Pope Gregory VII granted feudal rights to a member of his family, the Aldobrandeschi. The family's heirs sold the rights, and in the 14th century, Cetona was alternatingly ruled by Siena and Orvieto (until 1354), and, after a brief rule by Perugia, was annexed by Siena. An outer wall was built, containing two round towers (1458). Grand Duke Cosimo I de' Medici of Tuscany sold Cetona in 1556, to the marchese Chiappino Vitelli (1519–75), who made the fortress into a private residence, and built the piazza below it, today named Piazza Garibaldi. His descendants also erected Palazzo Vitelli in the late 17th century. Cetona was connected to Sarteano (1772–1840), and annexed to Italy in 1861.

The place name of Cetona or Citonia (local variation) probably comes from the Latin word caedita, "felled, deforested" with regard to a deforested and cultivated place. An early Christian baptistery, now a parish church, mentioned in documents as baptisterium Sancti Johannis de Queneto or de Queteno, may have been named in reference to the Chieteno stream that flows just south of Cetona.

== Main sights ==
Archeological finds are on display in Museo Civico per la Preistoria del Monte Cetona (in Town), which also administers the Parco Archeologico Naturalistico del Monte Cetona (three km towards Monte Cetona). The Rocca is still privately owned; the other significant hill is occupied by Palazzo a Parco Terrosi (1750), owned by Valentino.

Churches in Cetona are the Chiesa di San Michele Arcangelo (built 1155) and the Chiesa la Collegiata della San Trinita church (1475), as well as the Convento di San Francesco (since 1212) and Convento di Santa Maria a Belverde (frescoes by Cola Petruccioli of Orvieto).

== Economy ==
Cetona today is traditionally agricultural (vine, olive), but increasingly basing its economy on agritourism.
