= San Casciano dei Bagni =

- Comune
- Comune di San Casciano dei Bagni
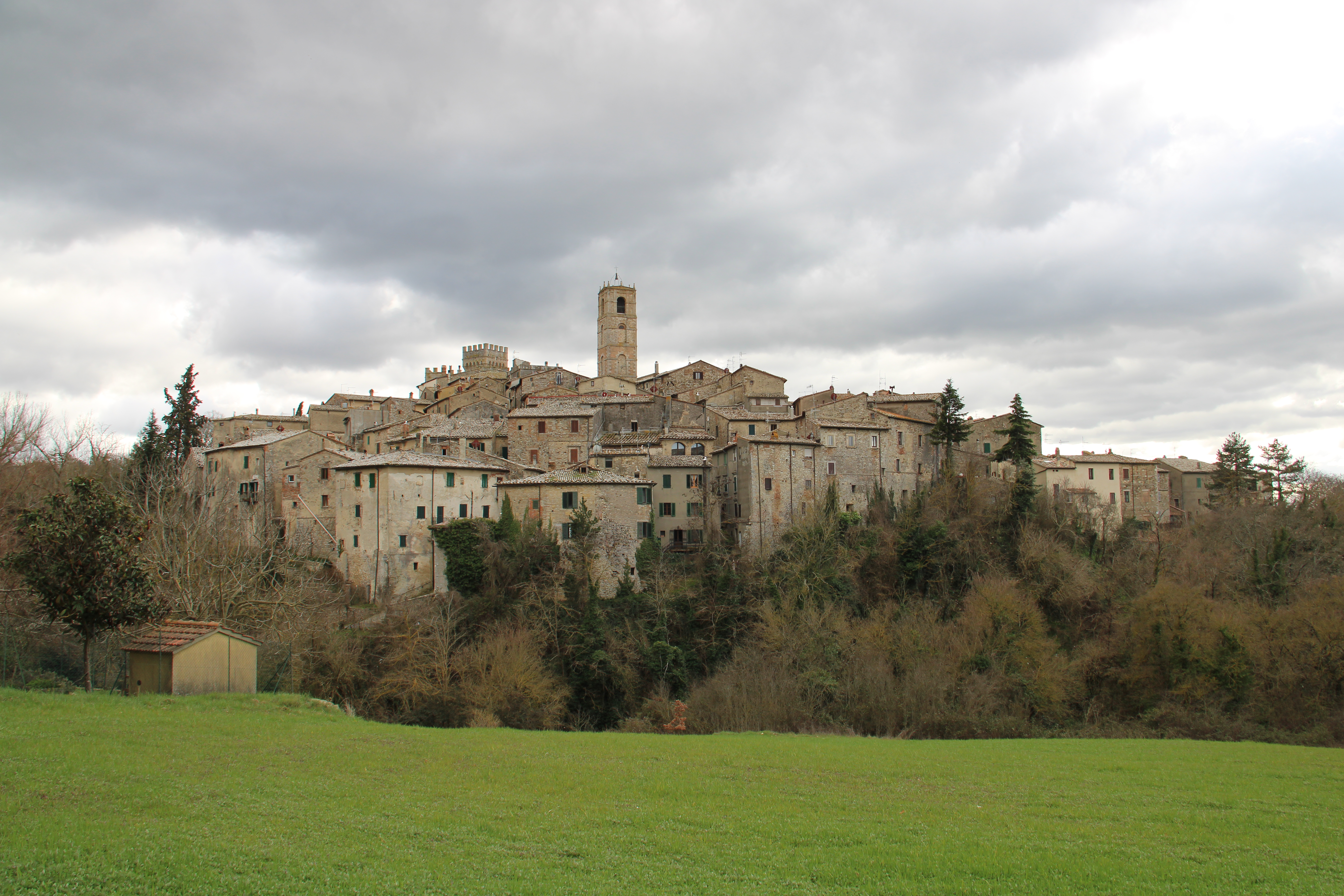

- Location within Italy Location within Tuscany
- Coordinates: 42°52′13″N 11°52′36″E
- Country: Italy
- Region: Tuscany
- Province: Siena (SI)
- Frazioni: Palazzone, Fighine, Celle sul Rigo, Ponte a Rigo

Area
  - Total: 92.14 km^{2} (35.58 sq mi)

Population (2018-01-01)
  - Total: 1,573
  - Density: 17.07/km^{2} (44.22/sq mi)
- Time zone: UTC+1 (CET)
  - Summer (DST): UTC+2 (CEST)
- Patron saint: San Cassiano
- Saint day: August 13
- Website: Official website

San Casciano dei Bagni is a comune (municipality) in the Province of Siena in the Italian region of Tuscany, located about 110 km (68 mi) southeast of Florence and about 70 km (43 mi) southeast of Siena. It is one of I Borghi più belli d'Italia ("The most beautiful villages of Italy").

== Geography ==
San Casciano dei Bagni borders the following municipalities: Abbadia San Salvatore, Acquapendente, Allerona, Cetona, Città della Pieve, Fabro, Piancastagnaio, Proceno, Radicofani, Sarteano.

A destination for travelers during ancient times, San Casciano dei Bagni is a member of a group of communities that are identified to modern tourists as the "prettiest Italian villages" (borghi piu belli d'Italia).

== History ==
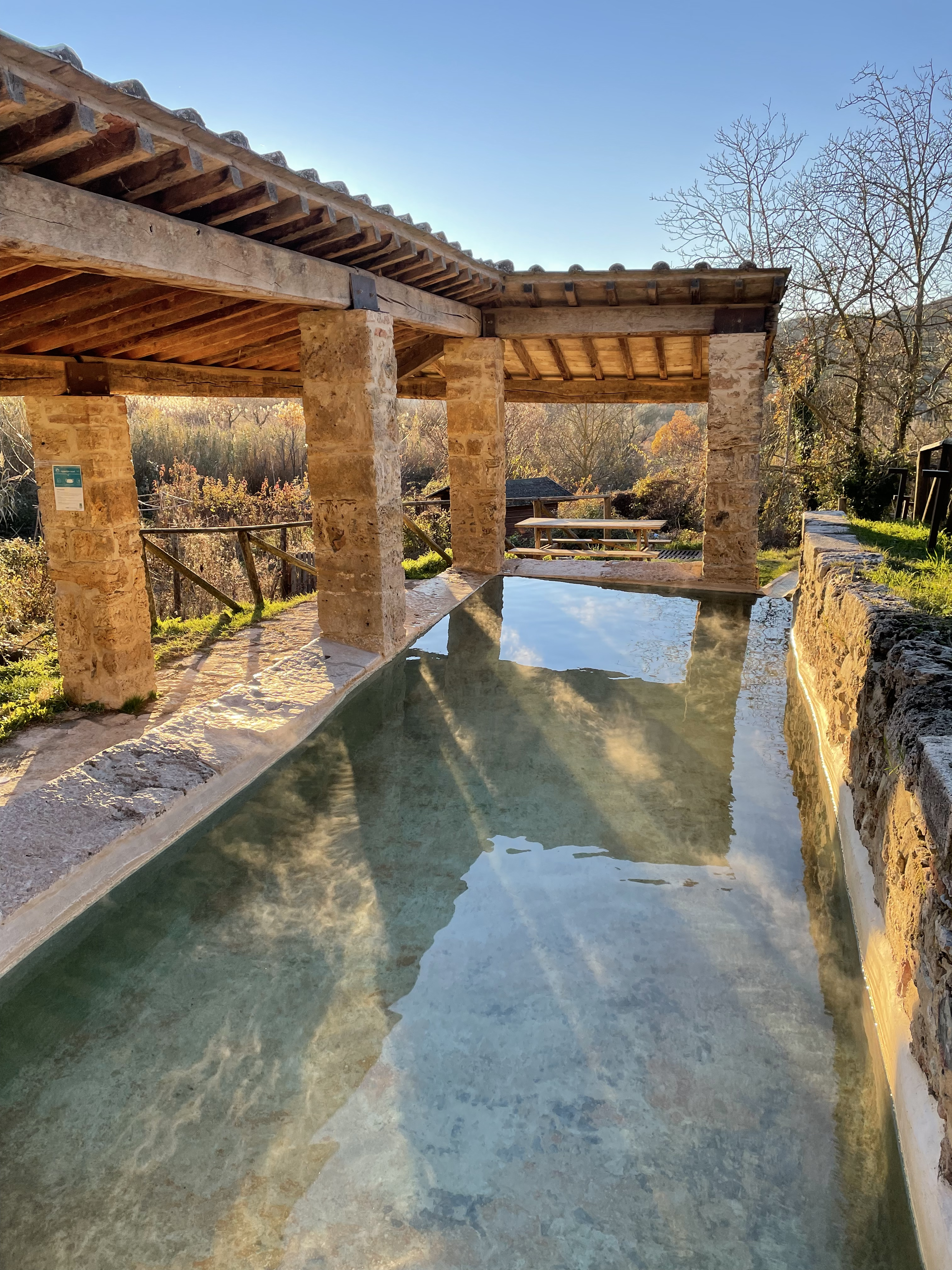
Ancient Roman baths built on an older, Etruscan sanctuary

The history of San Casciano is closely connected to the 42 hot springs with a mean temperature of 42 °C (108 °F) and a daily delivery of 5.5×10^{6} L (1,500,000 US gal) (third in Europe).

According to Livy, the thermal baths of Balnea Clusina were founded by Porsenna, an Etruscan king of Chiusi whom Roman sources date to the sixth century BC. Excavations in 2025 found objects that date the baths to the end of the 5th century BC, rather than the 3rd century BC previously believed. The finds, particularly the many anatomical votive objects in terracotta, also revealed that the baths were a major thermal healing sanctuary and also one of the foremost medical centres for the Etruscans which may have included an organised medical school. These votive finds were found in a sacred deposit, or favissa, used after their removal from active use and covered an extraordinary range of anatomical replicas whose quantity and accuracy are unparalleled elsewhere in the ancient world. Outstanding among these is a model from about 400 BC of human internal organs with striking accuracy suggesting advanced medical knowledge and practice. It also suggests that the sanctuary was a regional centre for medical knowledge, and artisans capable of producing the models in terracotta and bronze were part of the organisation and shared expertise with healers.

Other finds were closely associated with important religious ceremonies and suggest that a monumental sanctuary was near or above the thermal springs. A monumental Etruscan enclosure wall was found dating from the 3rd c. BC or earlier.

The baths continued to be popular during the ensuing Roman era, Augustus being said to have been amongst those using the baths.

Objects found from the end of the sanctuary’s life such as a bronze lightning bolt show that pagan worship ceased in the late 5th century after the Theodosian edict and after an abandonment ritual which included ancient altars being broken and moved to form a platform between the main spring and one to the south.

Also in the third to fourth centuries a Christian Pieve of St. Mary ad balneo existed in San Casciano.

During the Middle Ages it was initially under Lombard rule, and later under the Visconti di Campiglia and the Abbey of San Salvatore. Troops of San Casciano took part in the Battle of Montaperti in 1260. The last Visconti ruler was Monaldo, who also was podestà of Florence in 1389.

San Casciano was acquired by the Republic of Siena in 1412.

In Renaissance times its thermal baths attracted visitors from all over Europe, but visits began to decline in the nineteenth century, recovering only during the early twenty-first century.

== Main sights ==
- Ancient Roman hot baths
- Lago di San Casciano

== Archaeological excavations ==
=== The treasure of the baths ===
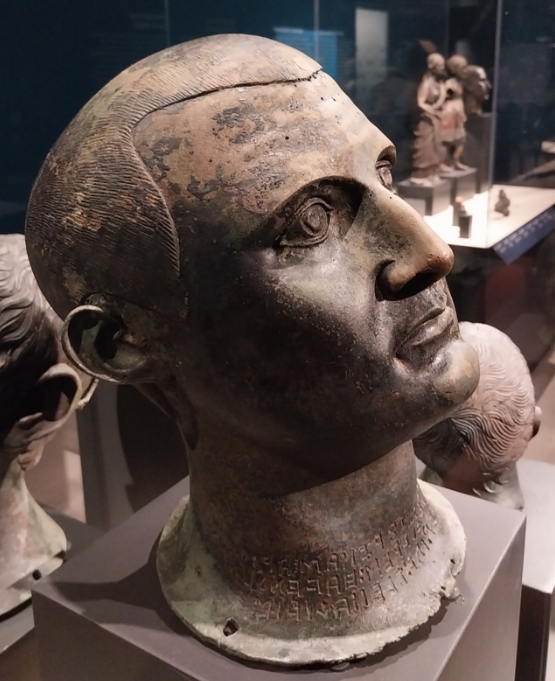
Bronze head with Etruscan inscription found in the bath

In 2022 a trove of 24 bronze Etruscan statues was discovered during archaeological excavations that began in 2019 at the ancient thermal baths. The baths date from the second century BC, a period of transition from Etruscan to Roman rule. The artifacts had decorated an earlier sanctuary that had existed and were buried in new construction by the Romans, likely in a rededication ritual.

The statues were covered by approximately 6,000 ancient bronze, silver, and gold coins and the artifacts were in an excellent state of preservation. They were hailed as the most significant archaeological find of their kind in 50 years, as most surviving objects from the period are in terracotta.

The discovery is also considered important since, in the period it covers, several wars were waged yet the statues, which bear inscriptions in both Etruscan and Latin, indicate that Etruscan and Roman families worshipped the statues' deities peacefully together here.

In 2024 more bronze statues were discovered as well as a total of 10,000 coins in perfect condition whose value is estimated to be several hundred million euros.
