= Città della Pieve =

- Comune
- Comune di Città della Pieve
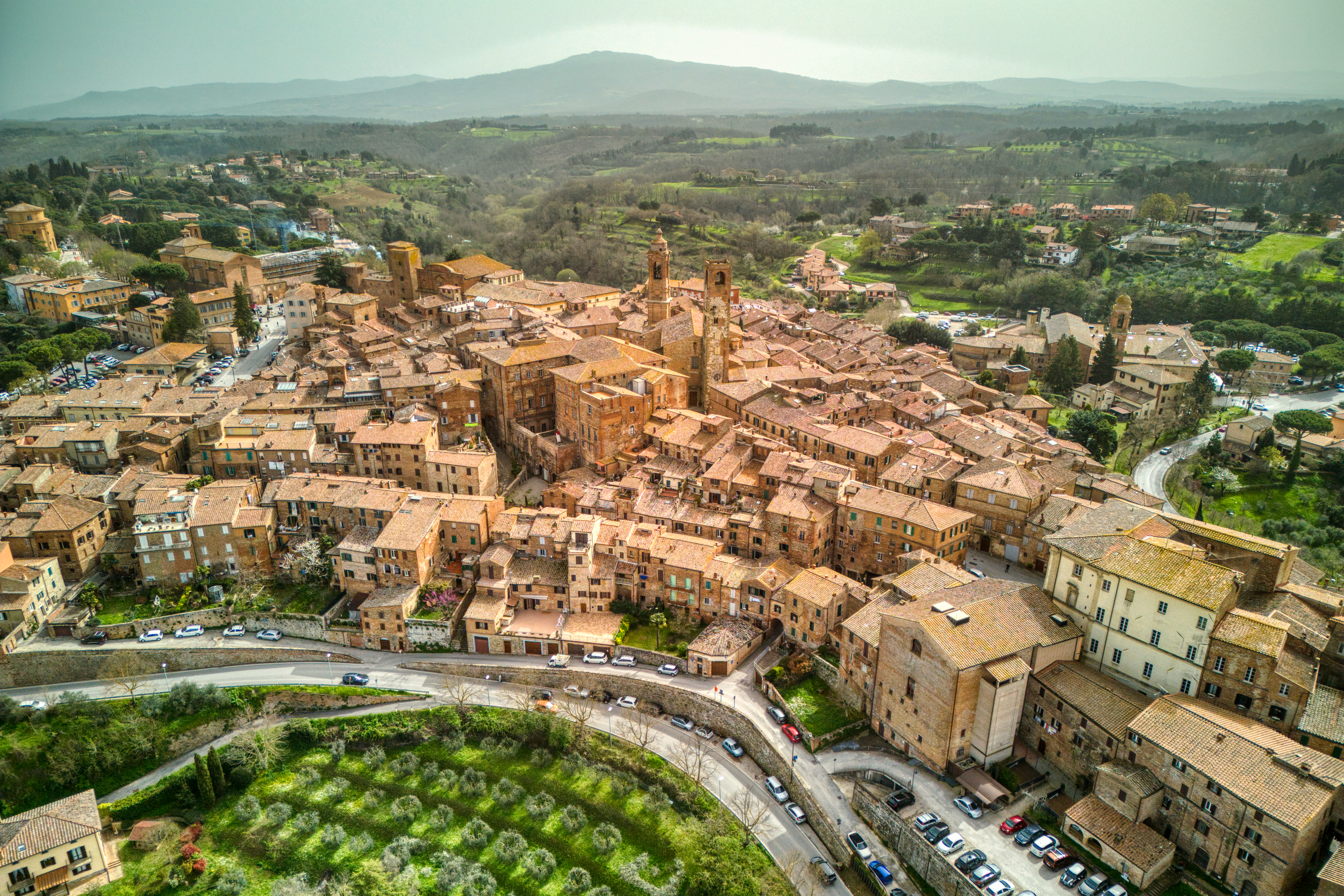
- Città della Pieve

- Location within Italy Location within Umbria
- Coordinates: 42.95215°N 12.002532°E
- Country: Italy
- Region: Umbria
- Province: Perugia

Government
  - Mayor: Fausto Risini

Area
  - Total: 111.5 km^{2} (43.1 sq mi)
- Elevation: 508 m (1,667 ft)

Population (1 January 2025)
  - Total: 7,388
  - Density: 66.26/km^{2} (171.6/sq mi)
- Demonym: Pievesi
- Time zone: UTC+1 (CET)
  - Summer (DST): UTC+2 (CEST)
- Postal code: 06062
- Dialing code: 0578
- Patron saint: Gervasius and Protasius
- Saint day: June 19
- Website: Official website

Città della Pieve is a comune (municipality) in the Province of Perugia in the Italian region Umbria, located in Valdichiana a few kilometres from the border between Umbria and Tuscany.

The town lies aabout 50 km (31 mi) southwest of Perugia and 11 km (7 mi) southeast of Chiusi in Tuscany.

== Etymology ==
The name of the town derives from its medieval designation Plebs Sancti Gervasii, attested around the 12th century, referring to the parish (pieve) dedicated to Saints Gervasius and Protasius. This evolved into Castrum Plebis in the later Middle Ages, then Castel della Pieve, and finally, after the grant of city status in 1600, into the modern name Città della Pieve.

Before becoming a Christian city it certainly had other names: Monte di Apollo, Castelforte di Chiuscio, Salepio or Castrum Salepia.

== History ==
=== Antiquity ===
Città della Pieve originated as an Etruscan settlement, probably a colony of Chiusi. The settlement later became a Roman municipium. According to tradition, the settlement grew after the victory of Sulla over Carbo in 85 BC in the nearby Chiana valley, when a Roman colony was established there.

=== Middle Ages ===
By the 7th century, the settlement was a fortified outpost of the Lombard Duchy of Chiusi. In the 8th century a parish church dedicated to Saints Gervasius and Protasius was built outside the walls. The settlement was granted to the papacy in 773 by Charlemagne.

The city was heavily affected by the conflicts between Guelphs and Ghibellines, locally known as the partito di sotto and the partito di sopra. In 1080 the town was involved in the wider conflict between Pope Gregory VII and Emperor Henry IV. In 1091 it was spared by the emperor, who devastated the surrounding countryside, but in 1099 it was sacked by Ghibelline forces from Siena. The repeated attacks and resulting damage led the bishop to abandon the see, which in 1100 was united with the diocese of Chiusi.

In 1170 Castel della Pieve allied itself with Orvieto and in the following year submitted to it. Subsequently, seeking greater security, it placed itself under the protection of Perugia, while retaining its status as a free municipality governed by its own magistrates with republican institutions.

By the 13th century the town was effectively under the authority of the Church. In 1228 Emperor Frederick II occupied several territories of the Papal States, including Castel della Pieve, but after his defeat in 1230 he refrained from further occupation and, in 1243, granted the town privileges and an expansion of its territory.

Control of the town shifted during the century. Under the podestà Raniero Bulgarelli it was brought back under Perugian authority, an arrangement confirmed in 1251 by imperial and papal approval.

In 1284 Pope Martin IV stayed in the town for several months due to illness while travelling between Orvieto and Perugia. In 1288 the alliance with Perugia was renewed, and the inhabitants were tasked with completing the construction of the tower known as Beccati quello on Lake Chiusi.

In the early 14th century further efforts were made to control factional violence, including the construction of a fortress in 1306. Despite this, internal conflicts continued. Later in the century the town briefly passed out of Perugian control, being granted by Pope Gregory XI to a member of the Turenne family, though this arrangement was short-lived. By the late 14th century the town had regained its freedom and entered into alliances with Florence and with Barnabò Visconti of Milan, while maintaining relations with Perugia.

In 1393 Perugia attempted to impose a podestà, prompting a popular uprising led by Neruccio di Oddo. The inhabitants seized the fortress and placed themselves under the leadership of Biordo Michelotti, who assumed the title of count of the Pieve with the support of the Visconti of Milan. This arrangement was temporary, and the town soon returned to the authority of the Church, though members of the Michelotti family retained control for a limited period under papal terms.

The town came under the control of Braccio Fortebracci in 1420, but after his death it returned to an alliance with Perugia. Pope Martin V later worked to restore direct papal authority over the territory.

During the 15th century the town faced external threats from the Visconti of Milan and Francesco Sforza, as well as conflicts with nearby Cetona. In 1462 it was struck by a severe plague. In 1464 municipal statutes were reformed to prohibit the display of party symbols and clothing that signaled political affiliation.

=== Early Modern era ===
In the early 16th century Città della Pieve witnessed notable events, including the passage of Cesare Borgia and, in 1510, a visit by Pope Julius II. In 1527 the town suffered a devastating sack by troops of Charles V, returning from Rome after the Sack of Rome, resulting in the deaths of about 800 inhabitants and widespread destruction.

Following these events, Pope Clement VII placed the town under direct papal control, appointing cardinal governors beginning in 1529. In the 16th century it was granted to the Marquises Della Corgna, before Pope Pius V abolished the arrangement in 1566. In October 1600 Pope Clement VIII elevated Castel della Pieve to the rank of city, giving it the name Città della Pieve and restoring its episcopal seat.

In 1642, troops of Odoardo Farnese, marching toward the War of Castro, caused significant damage and carried out a sack of the city. The following year, after a failed defense organized under papal authority, the town was besieged and taken by forces led by Mattias de' Medici; significant destruction followed before it returned to papal control after peace was concluded.

Long-standing disputes over boundaries with Cetona and Chiusi along the river Chiana continued into the 18th century. These were resolved by agreements in 1778 and 1780, which also led to the drainage and reclamation of the Val di Chiana. The works, begun in 1783, improved agricultural land and reduced unhealthy marsh conditions. A prefecture of waters was established in the town in connection with these hydraulic works.

In 1778 and 1780 agreements between the Papal States and Tuscany resolved long-standing boundary disputes along the Chiani river and led to the drainage and reclamation of the Valdichiana. The works, begun in 1783, improved agricultural land and reduced unhealthy marsh conditions. A Prefettura delle acque was established in the town in connection with these hydraulic works.

=== Modern era ===
During the French period, Città della Pieve formed a canton within the French Empire, and after the Restoration it was included in the Delegation of Perugia.

A provisional government was established in 1859, followed by annexation to the Kingdom of Italy in 1860.

== Geography ==
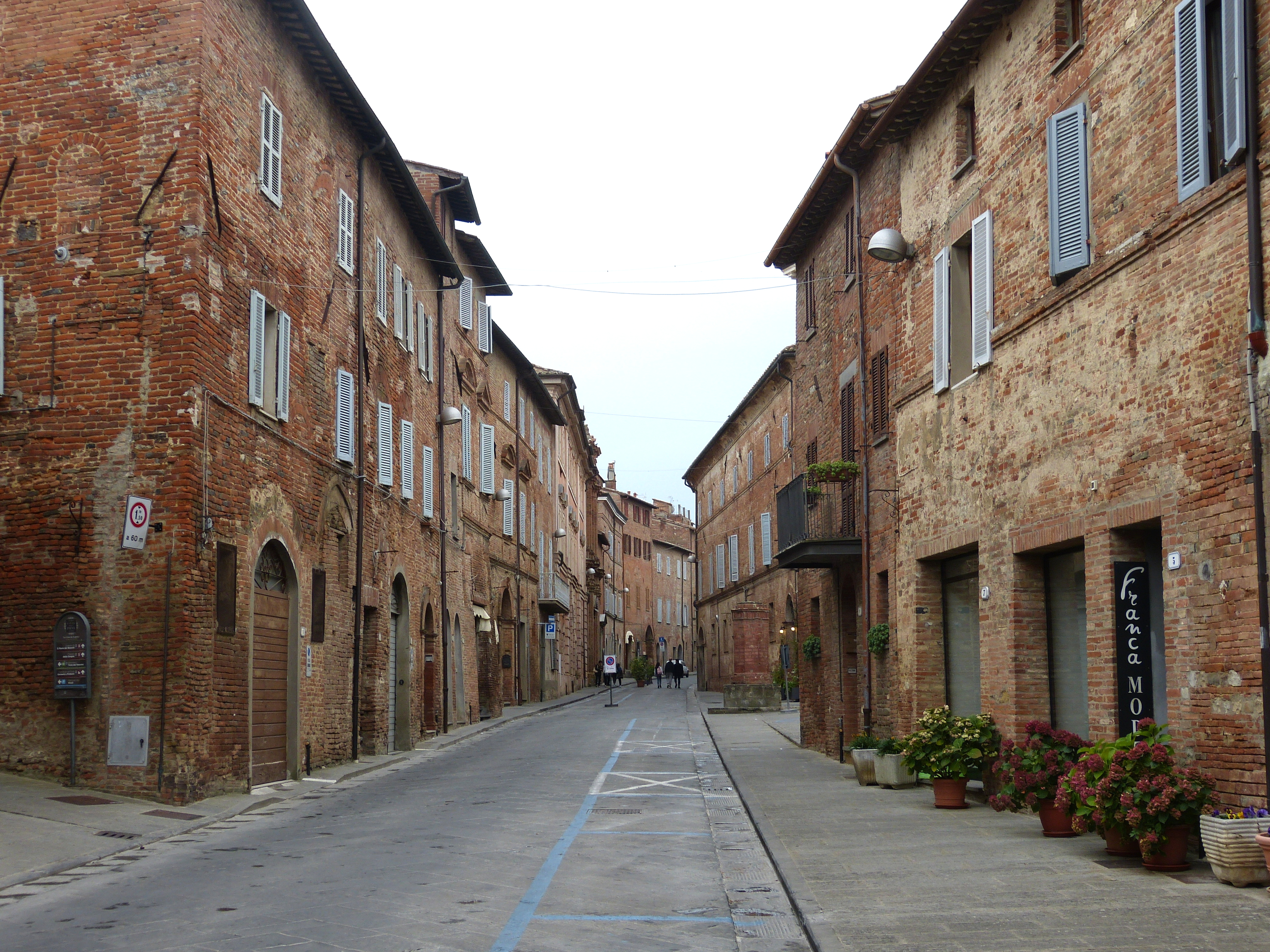
Via Vannucci, the main street in Città della Pieve

Città della Pieve stands on a hill at about 508 metres (1,667 ft) above sea level and approximately 260 metres (850 ft) above the Valdichiana. It occupies a position overlooking Lake Trasimeno, with views toward Cortona to the north, Perugia to the east, Orvieto and Viterbo to the south, and Montepulciano to the west.

At the foot of the hill flow the Tresa, which enters the lake of Chiusi and contributes to the Arno basin, as well as the Chiani and the Astrone, which flow into the Paglia.

Città della Pieve borders the following municipalities: Allerona, Castiglione del Lago, Fabro, Monteleone d'Orvieto, Paciano, Piegaro in Umbria, and Cetona, Chiusi and San Casciano dei Bagni in Tuscany.

=== Subdivisions ===
The municipality includes the localities of Casaltondo, Case Lunghe, Caticciano, Città della Pieve, Concello, Lagarello, Madonna della Sanità, Maranzano, Moiano, Paiccio, Palazzolo, Pò Bandino, Poggetto, Poggio San Litardo, Ponticelli, Popoltaio-Schiacciato, Ravigliano, San Biagio, San Donato, San Litardo, Sigliano, Valdilucciole.

In 2021, 1,057 people lived in rural dispersed dwellings not assigned to any named locality. At the time, the most populous localities were Città della Pieve proper (3,152), Po' Bandino (1,002), and Moiano (755).

== Religion ==
=== Cathedral ===
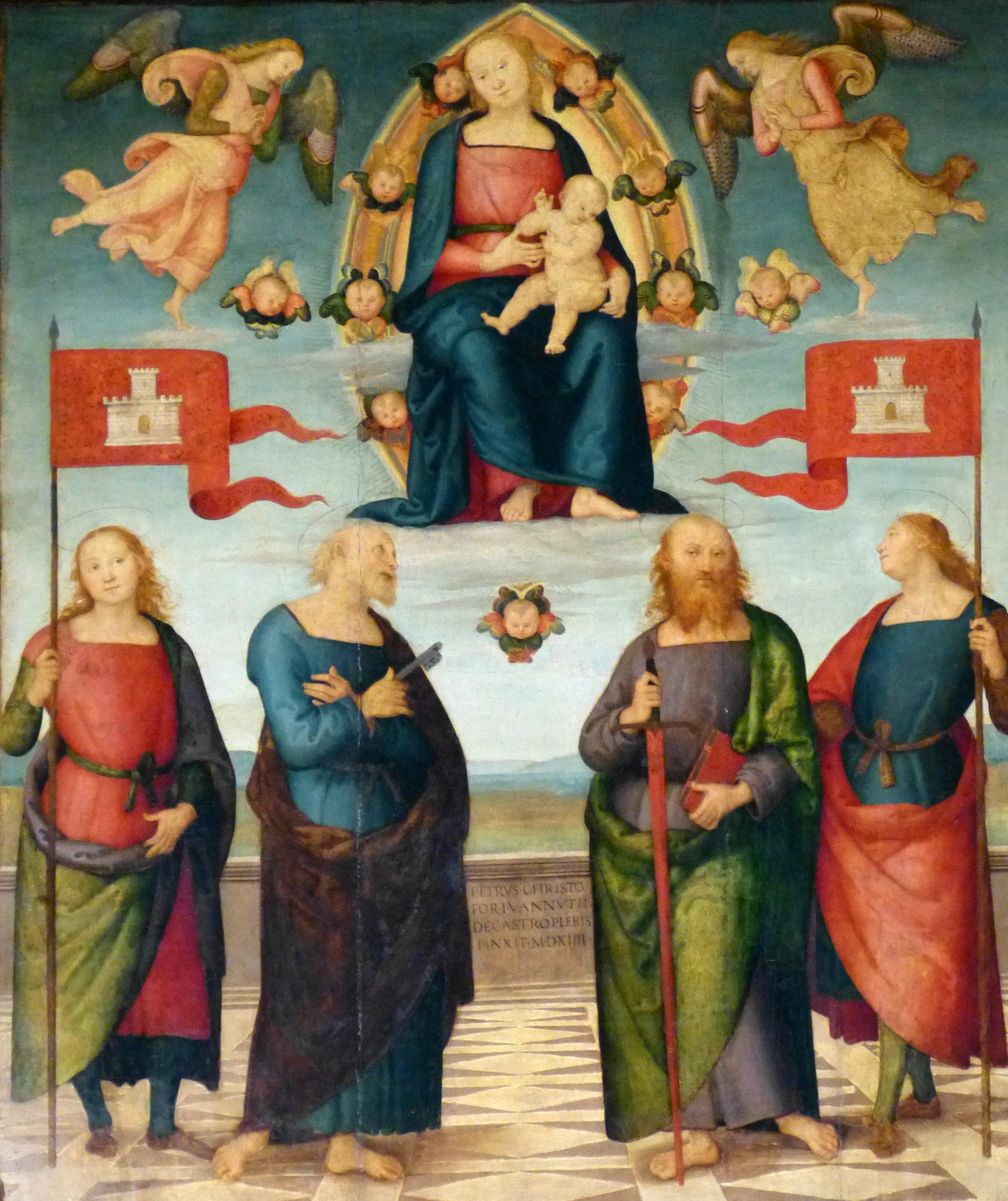
The high-altar painting Madonna with Child and Saints, executed by Perugino in 1514

The Cathedral of Città della Pieve, dedicated to Saints Gervasius and Protasius, occupies the site of an earlier parish church, possibly founded in the 8th century, enlarged in the mid-13th century, and completely rebuilt in the 16th century. It was reconsecrated in 1584 and later elevated to cathedral status.

From the medieval structure remain parts of the façade with Gothic arcading, the lower section of the bell tower, and a substructure beneath the church, possibly a crypt. In the 16th century the floor level was raised and the apse rebuilt in 1574. After the collapse of the roof in 1667, it was replaced by a brick vault in 1679.

The interior has a single nave in the form of a Latin cross with side chapels. Works of art include paintings by Domenico Alfani, Giannicola di Paolo, and Perugino, whose works include a Madonna with Child and Saints dated 1514 and a Saint John the Baptist dated 1510.

The feast of the patron saints is celebrated on 19 June, and the relics of Saint Pontianus are also venerated.

=== Sant'Agostino ===
The original church existed before the 13th century in the locality of San Leonardo along the road to Piegaro, and was later transferred to its present site. The current building retains 15th-century architectural features.

The high altar contains a fresco of Christ blessing, surrounded by seraphim, with figures of Saint Anthony Abbot and other saints, attributed to Perugino. The sacristy houses a painting of Saint Jerome in the desert attributed to Muziano, while the former chapter room preserves frescoes in the style of the Giotto school.

=== Santa Maria dei Servi ===
The Gothic church of Santa Maria dei Servi stands just outside the medieval walls near Porta Romana. A church dedicated to the Madonna della Stella is recorded on the site from the 13th century, when the Servite Order established a convent and parish there. The complex was expanded throughout the century and further enlarged between 1486 and 1487. Following the suppressions after the Unification of Italy, the convent was converted into a civil hospital.

The church has a single nave with a square apse and ribbed vaulting. Gothic elements remain visible on the façade, including trilobed arches in brick. Around the mid-19th century a bell tower in Neoclassical style was added, designed by Giovanni Santini.

The interior, refurbished in the 17th century, features Baroque stucco decoration. An earlier fresco of the Madonna della Stella with Saints, of Peruginesque style, has been uncovered on the first altar to the right.

The church preserves a fragmentary Deposition from the Cross by Perugino, dated 1517, among the final works of the artist. The fresco was rediscovered in 1834 and subsequently attracted the attention of 19th-century artistic movements. A painting of the Resurrection of Lazarus in the sacristy is attributed to Pomarancio.

=== Santa Maria dei Bianchi ===
The Church of Santa Maria dei Bianchi, formerly the oratory of the Disciplinati, is attested from the 14th century and originally had a hospital attached. In the 18th century a new church was constructed on the structure of the earlier building; the interior was completed in 1743, while work on the façade began in 1772 and was finished around 1780, showing both Rococo and Neoclassical influences.

In the sacristy is a fresco by Antonio Circignani, dated 1606, depicting the Presentation of Mary at the Temple, though it has been damaged by humidity. In 1504 Pietro Vannucci painted the entire back wall with the Adoration of the Magi. The composition includes numerous figures, with particular care given to the central group, while the lateral figures were likely executed with the assistance of his workshop.

=== Church of the Blessed Giacomo ===
This church contains a painting of the Assumption attributed to Circignani, known as Pomarancio.

=== Church and Convent of San Francesco ===
The church contains paintings attributed to Orazio Alfani and Muziano. In the adjoining convent are frescoes, including a large Crucifixion with saints and other works from the Giotto school.

== Culture ==
=== Palazzo dei Duchi della Corgna ===
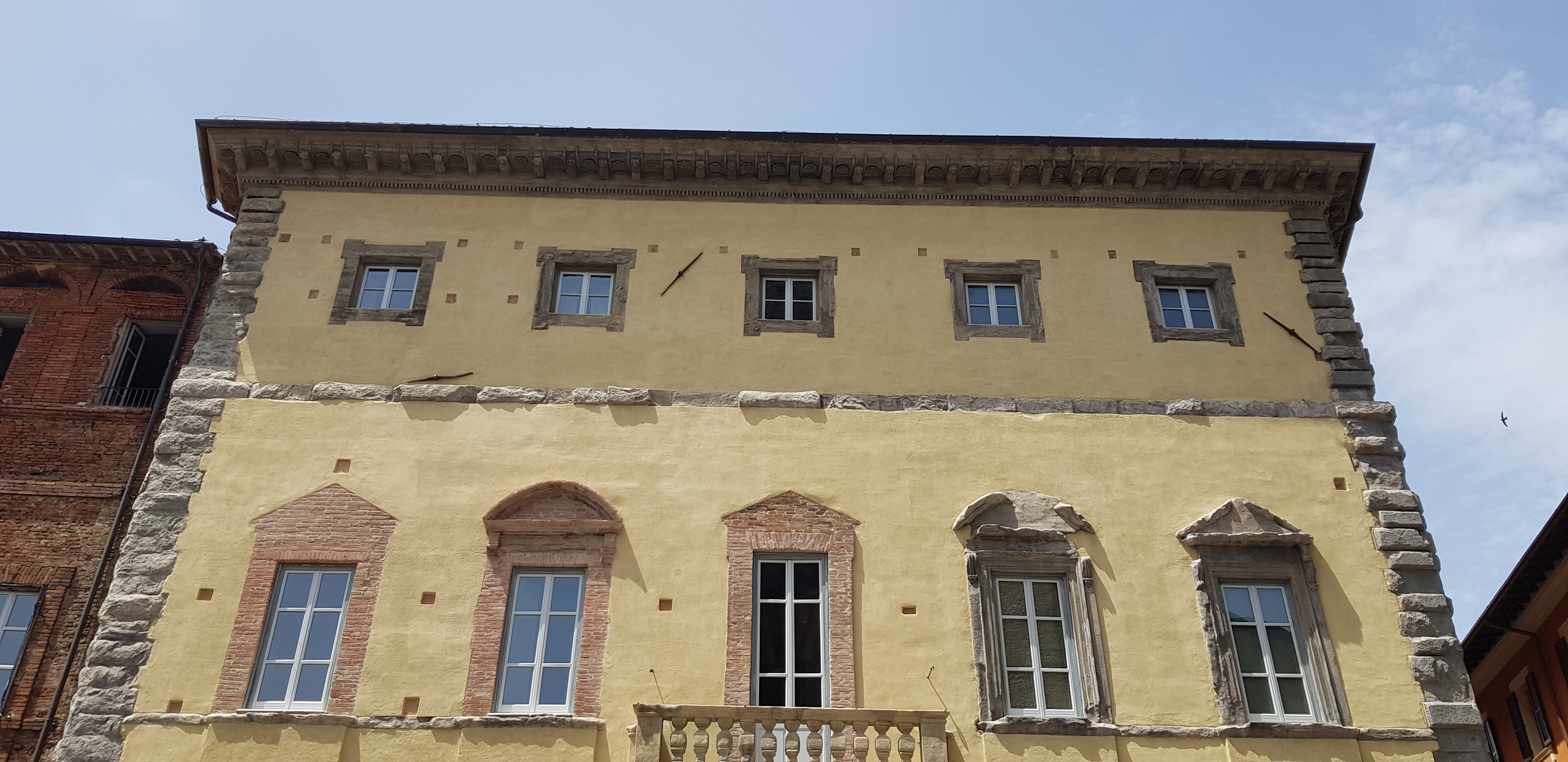
Central bay of the palace façade with windows framed in brick and stone, accompanied by a balcony with balustrade marking the piano nobile

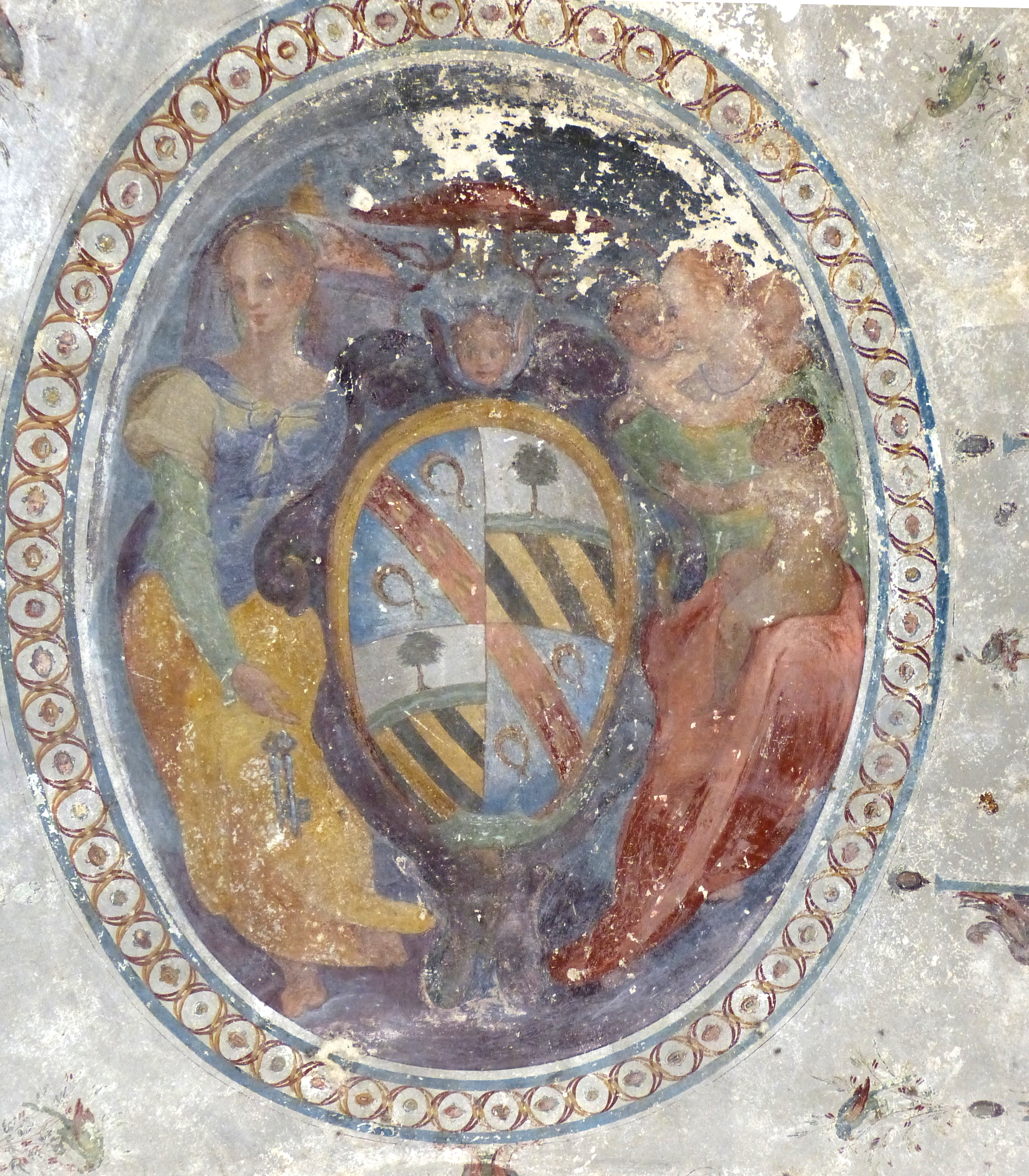
Allegorical female figure and a putto flanking the Heraldic shield of the Della Corgna

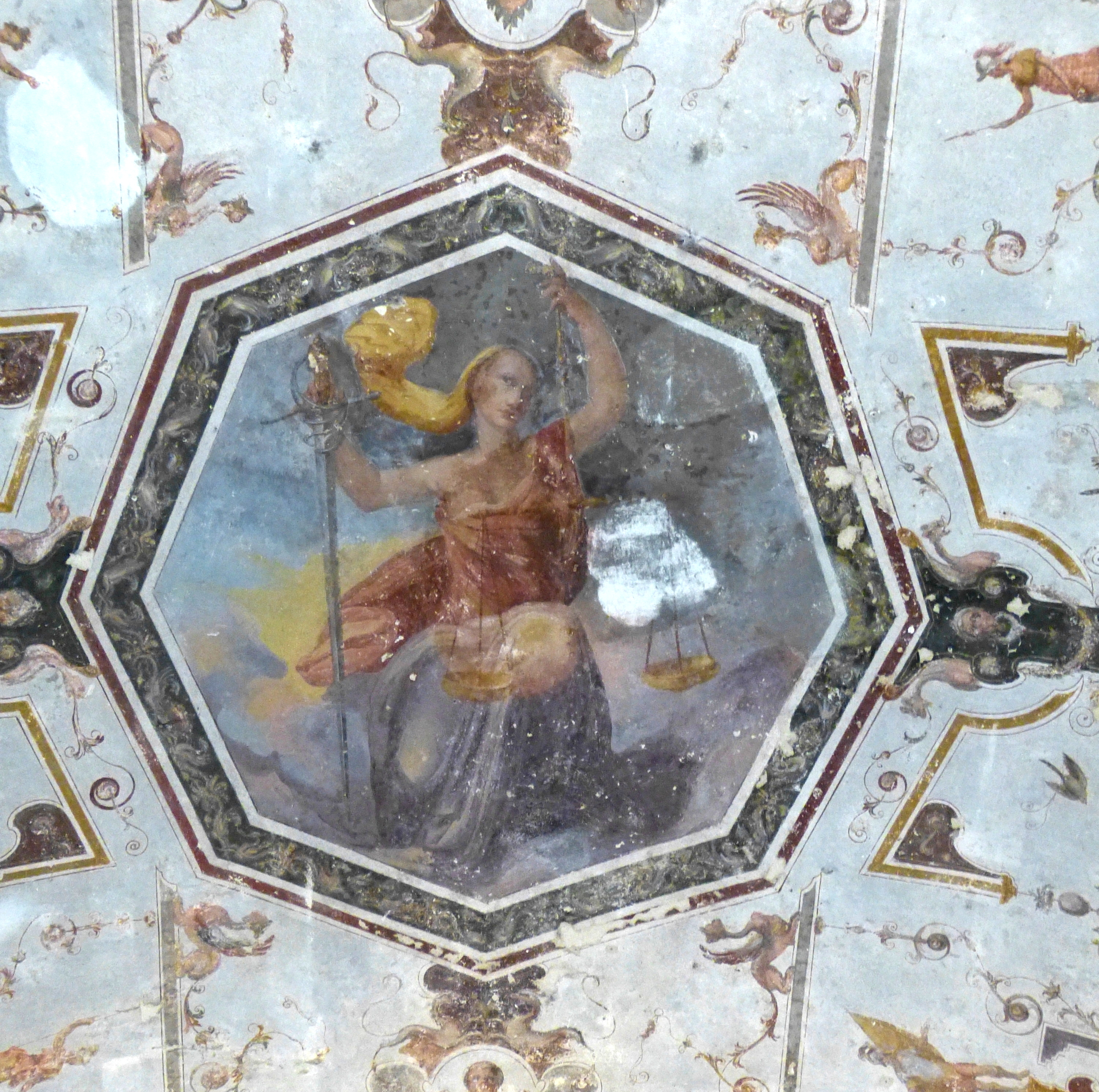
Ceiling fresco depicting Justice holding sword and scales

Palazzo della Corgna is the most significant aristocratic residence in Città della Pieve. It was built in the mid-16th century in the central square, opposite the cathedral, under the direction of Galeazzo Alessi for Ascanio della Corgna. The structure incorporated an earlier hunting lodge belonging to the Baglioni family, itself derived from medieval tower houses.

The palace once included a notable garden, of which little remains. The building, now municipally owned, has undergone restoration of both its structure and decorative elements. The façade is decorated with reliefs in pietra serena.

The interior is richly frescoed. On the first floor, the representative rooms and the apartment of Ascanio della Corgna contain frescoes by Niccolò Circignani, dated 1564, depicting a Concert of Muses. The ground floor, formerly used as a more private space, is attributed to Salvio Savini, who painted a Banquet of the Gods.

Its lower floors and staircase are decorated with frescoes by the Zuccari, and it housed paintings attributed to Caravaggio and Subleyras, as well as a 17th-century tapestry.

=== Other secular buildings ===
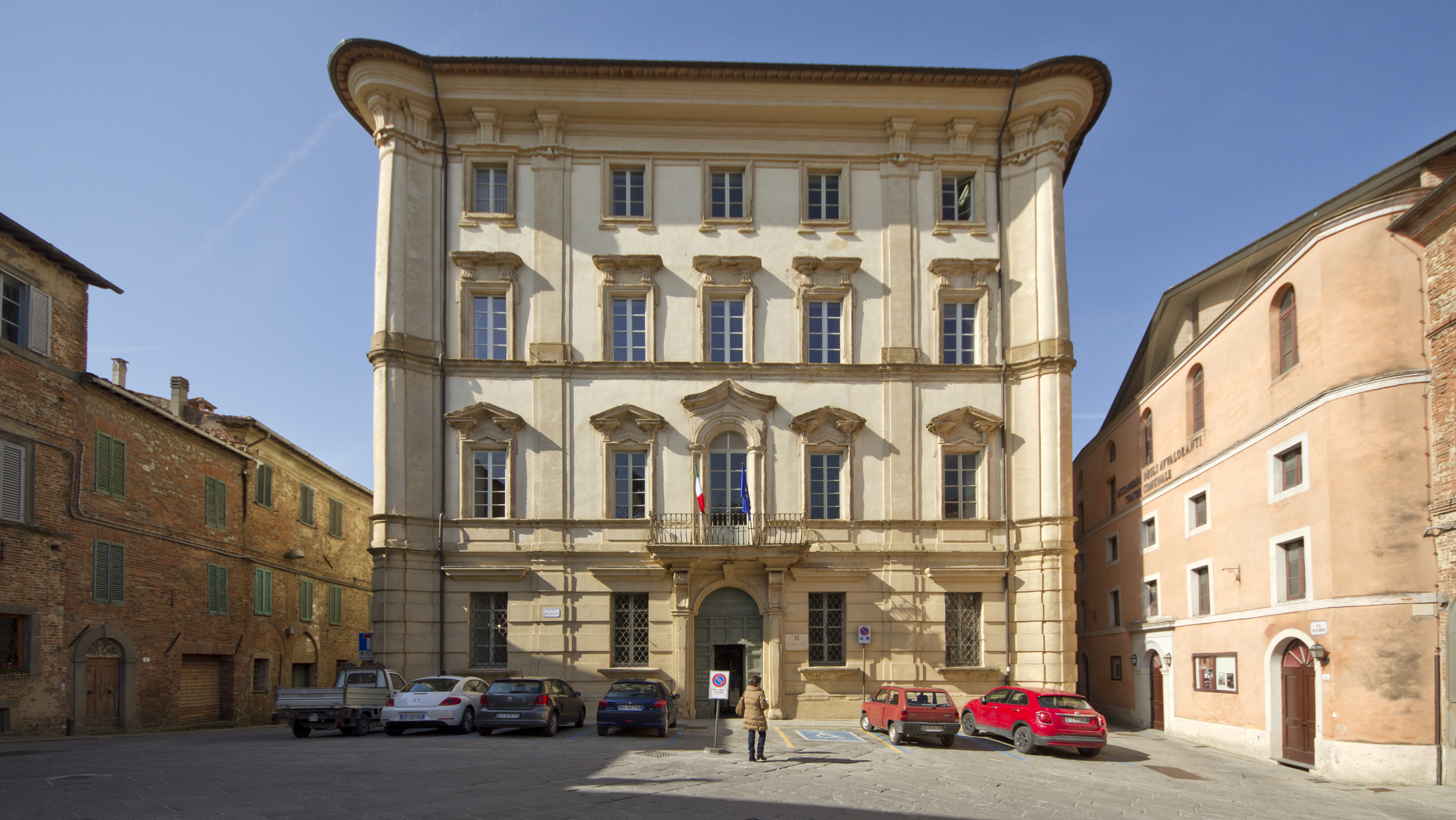
Palazzo della Fargna

The Rocca dates to the 13th century and originally featured multiple defensive enclosures connected by towers, of which three survive, later adapted for use as prisons. It was subsequently modified for residential use by Cardinal Coppi and later altered under Pope Pius VII.

The Palazzo Vescovile was built on the ruins of the ancient palace of the bishops of Chiusi and includes a chapel with a painting attributed to Perugino.

Other notable palaces include those of the Fargna di Laval family, in Baroque style; the Rinaldi palace, formerly belonging to the Bandini family, restored from the 16th century; and the Cartoni, Smaghi, and Taccini palaces, the latter said to stand on the site of the house of Perugino.

=== Other cultural aspects ===
The Teatro degli Accademici Avvalorati was constructed in 1834 under the direction of the architect Santini, funded by local families. Built in Ionic style, it has a capacity of 700 spectators and features interior decorations by the Perugian scenographers Angelini and Baldini.

=== Archeology ===
Numerous archaeological finds related to the Etruscans have been discovered in the surrounding territory, including tombs and funerary objects such as alabaster and travertine urns with reliefs and Etruscan inscriptions. Notable discoveries include tombs found in 1864 at a place known as Palazzaccio, and a chamber tomb uncovered in 1880 about 1 kilometre (0.62 mi) from the town, containing urns, bronze mirrors, fibulae and other grave goods.

== Notable people ==
Città della Pieve is the birthplace of the painter Pietro Vannucci, known as Perugino, master of Raphael.

Among military figures were Biordo Michelotti; Bandino Bandini, a general of the Papal forces; Vanne di Galasso Bandini, a condottiero; Ranieri Bandini, defender of Castel della Pieve; and Lazzaro Bandini, who served the Republic of Venice. Other captains included members of the Oddi family, Giotto di Gnotto, Poccio di Neri, Placido Moscatelli, and Nanni di Castel della Pieve.

In the fields of law and scholarship, notable figures include Paolo Brizi, Francesco della Fargna, Pietro and Giambattista Paolini, Silvio Coscetti, and Niccolò Rinaldi.

In the arts and architecture, figures include Matteo di Giuliano Balducci, Fabio della Corgna, architect Girolamo Rinaldi, and Girolamo Scaccia. Other artists from Città della Pieve include Antonio Circignani and Cesare Sermei, both painters; Andrea Basili, a composer and music theorist; and Cesare Orlandi, a writer.

Among other notable figures associated with Città della Pieve are the poet Francesco Melosio, and the 19th-century figures Luigi Baldenti and engineer Giuseppe Bolletti.

In the field of sport, notable figures include middle-distance runner Giacomo Peppicelli, as well as Olympic shooter Diana Bacosi and shooter Katiuscia Spada.
