= Ponticelli (disambiguation) =

Ponticelli may refer to:

- Ponticelli, an eastern suburb of Naples, Italy
- Lazare Ponticelli (1897 – 2008), the last surviving official French veteran of the First World War
- Ponticelli (Città della Pieve)
