= Pò Bandino =

Po' Bandino
- Frazione
- Location within Italy
- Coordinates: 43°00′12″N 11°58′18″E
- Country: Italy
- Region: Umbria
- Province: Perugia
- Comune: Città della Pieve
- Elevation: 252 m (827 ft)

Population (2001)
  - Total: 834
- Time zone: UTC+1 (CET)
  - Summer (DST): UTC+2 (CEST)
- Postcode: 06062
- Area code: 0578

Po' Bandino is a frazione of the comune of Città della Pieve in the Province of Perugia, Umbria, central Italy. It stands at an elevation of 252 metres above sea level. At the time of the Istat census of 2001 it had 834 inhabitants.
