= Cesare Orlandi =

Italian writer and historian

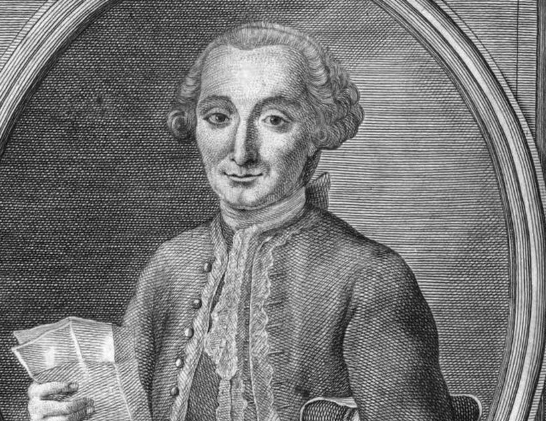
- Picture of Cesare Orlandi, taken from the first volume of his work Delle città d'Italia e sue isole adjacenti compendiose notizie (1770-1778)
- Born: July 26, 1734
- Died: December 20, 1779; Perugia
- Writing career
- Language: Italian

Cesare Orlandi (Città della Pieve, 26 July 1734 – Perugia, 20 December 1779) was an Italian writer and historian. He was a nobleman of Fermo, Atri and Città della Pieve, and he's known only for his work Delle città d'Italia e sue isole adjacenti [sic] compendiose notizie (1770-1778), which contains comprehensive details and high-quality landscape views of many Italian cities (a landscape view is attached at the beginning of each section and for each city). It was published in volumes over almost a decade (1770-1778). He is likely to be the "Abatte Cesare Orlandi" who edited and published an edition of Cesare Ripa's "Iconology" in 1764, which contains a portrait.

The work was unfinished at his death in 1779, and the Italian cities covered in his work span from letter A (Volume I) to letter C (Volume V). The work is often a valuable source of information about the structure, architecture, history and social organization of many Italian cities up to the XVIII century.

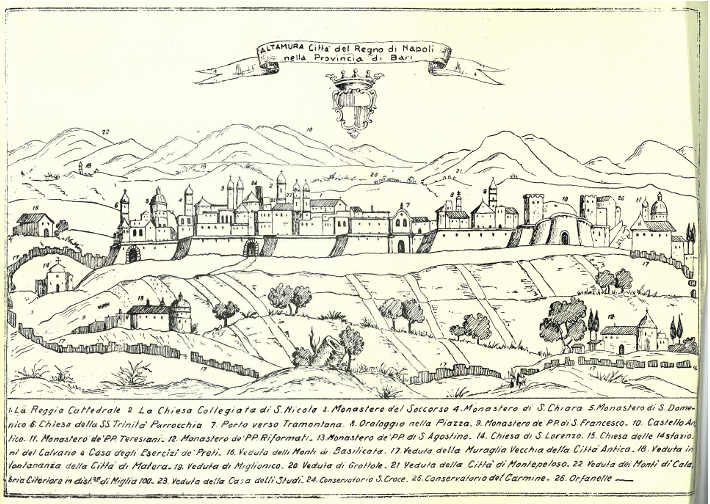
A picture taken from Cesare Orlandi's work, a landscape view of Altamura

== Works ==
- Orlandi, Cesare (1770). Delle città d'Italia e sue isole adjacenti [sic] compendiose notizie - Volume I. Perugia: Stamperia Augusta, presso Mario Riginaldi.
- Orlandi, Cesare (1772). Delle città d'Italia e sue isole adjacenti [sic] compendiose notizie - Volume II. Perugia: Stamperia Augusta, presso Mario Riginaldi.
- Orlandi, Cesare (1774). Delle città d'Italia e sue isole adjacenti [sic] compendiose notizie - Volume III. Perugia: Stamperia Augusta, presso Mario Riginaldi.
- Orlandi, Cesare (1775). Delle città d'Italia e sue isole adjacenti [sic] compendiose notizie - Volume IV. Perugia: Stamperia Augusta, presso Mario Riginaldi.
- Orlandi, Cesare (1778). Delle città d'Italia e sue isole adjacenti [sic] compendiose notizie - Volume V. Perugia: Stamperia Augusta, presso Mario Riginaldi.

== See also ==
- Città della Pieve
- Perugia
