= National Archaeological Museum of Chiusi =

- Museo archeologico nazionale di Chiusi
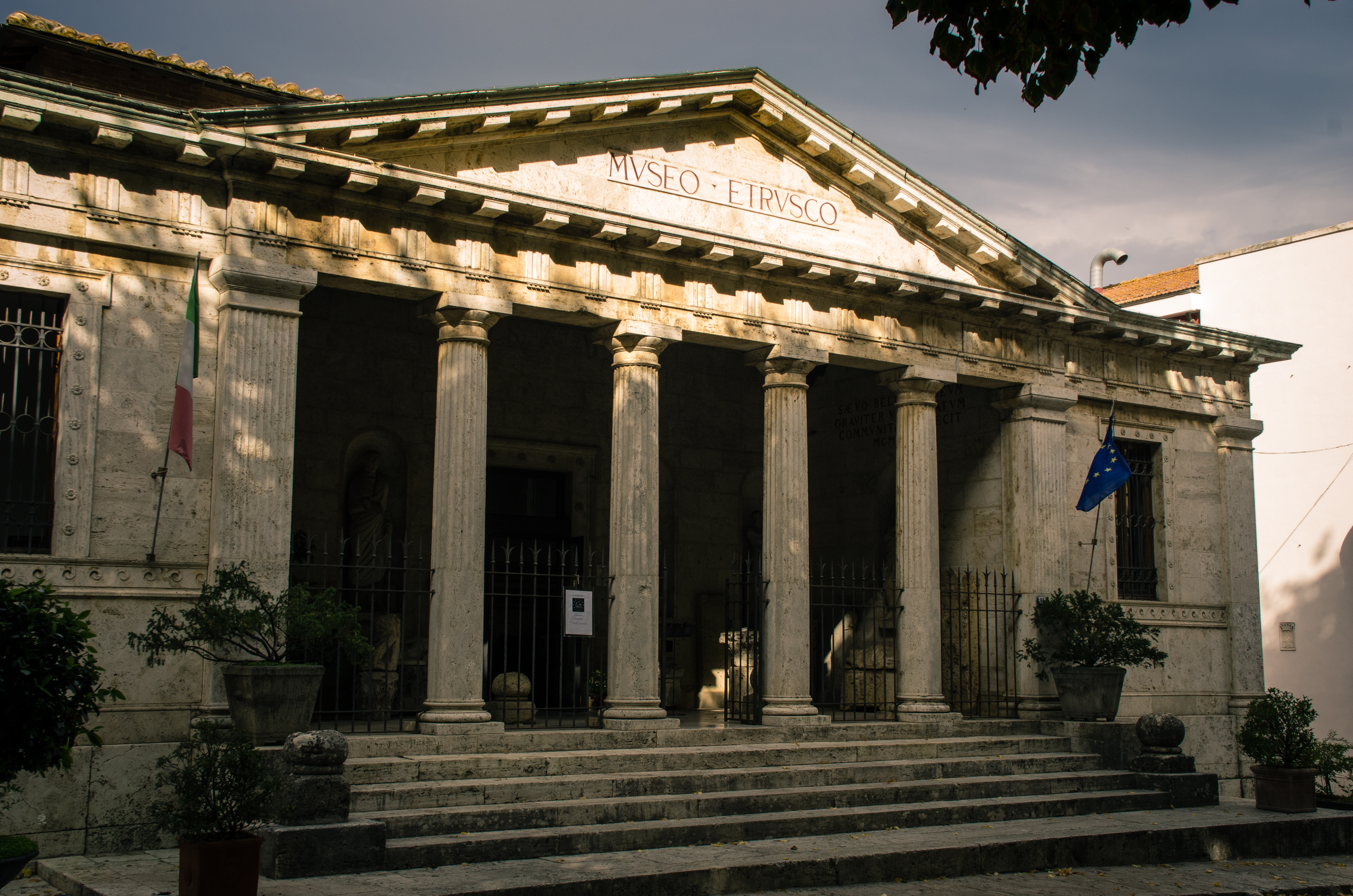
- Location: Chiusi, Italy
- Coordinates: 43°00′58″N 11°56′58″E
- Type: museum

The National Archaeological Museum of Chiusi is a museum in Chiusi, Siena, Italy. It contains Ancient Greek, Etruscan, Ancient Roman and Lombard items, many of which have been excavated in the surrounding province. The museum also has a restoration laboratory, specializing in archaeological materials.

== Some excavated items ==
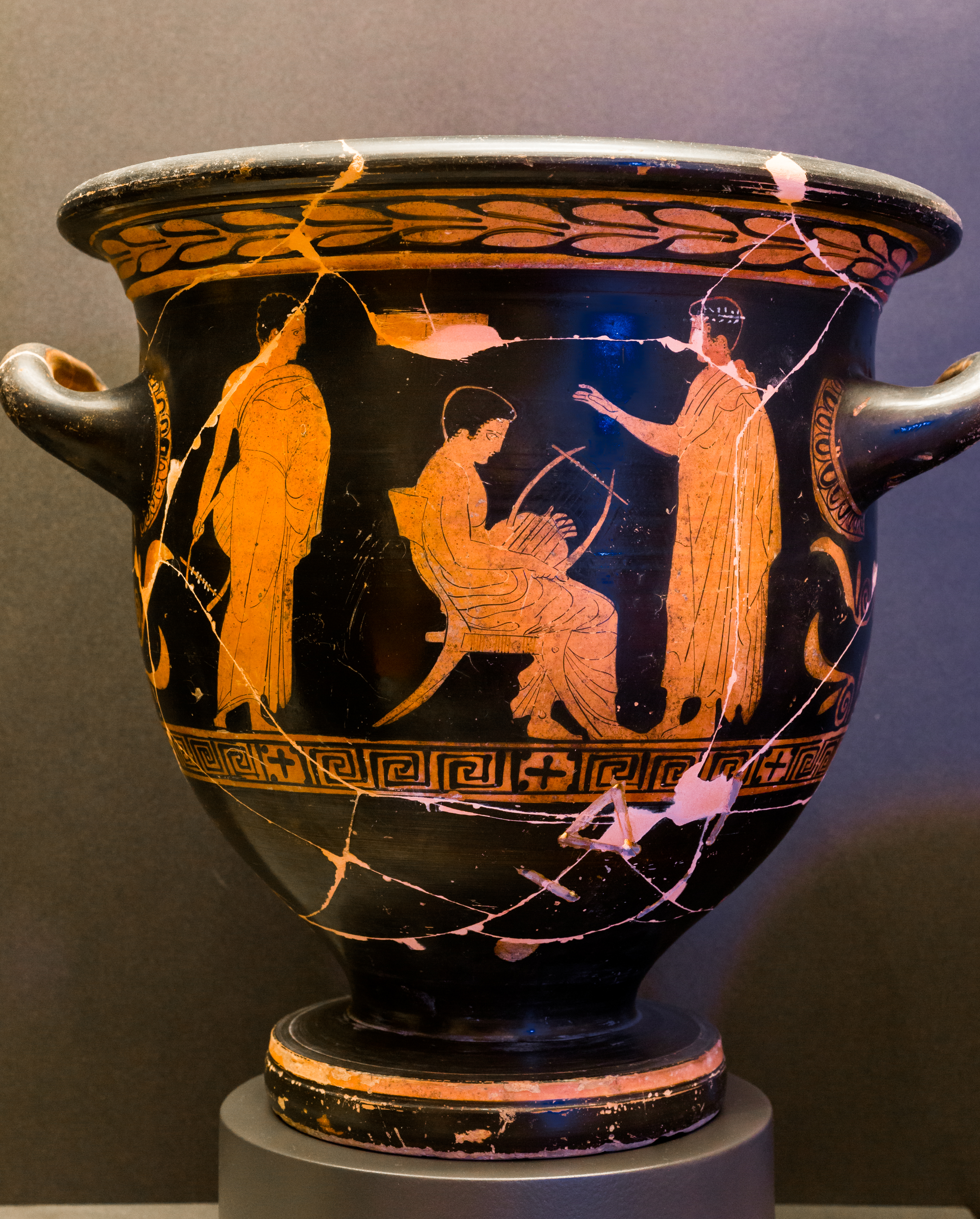
A Greek vase

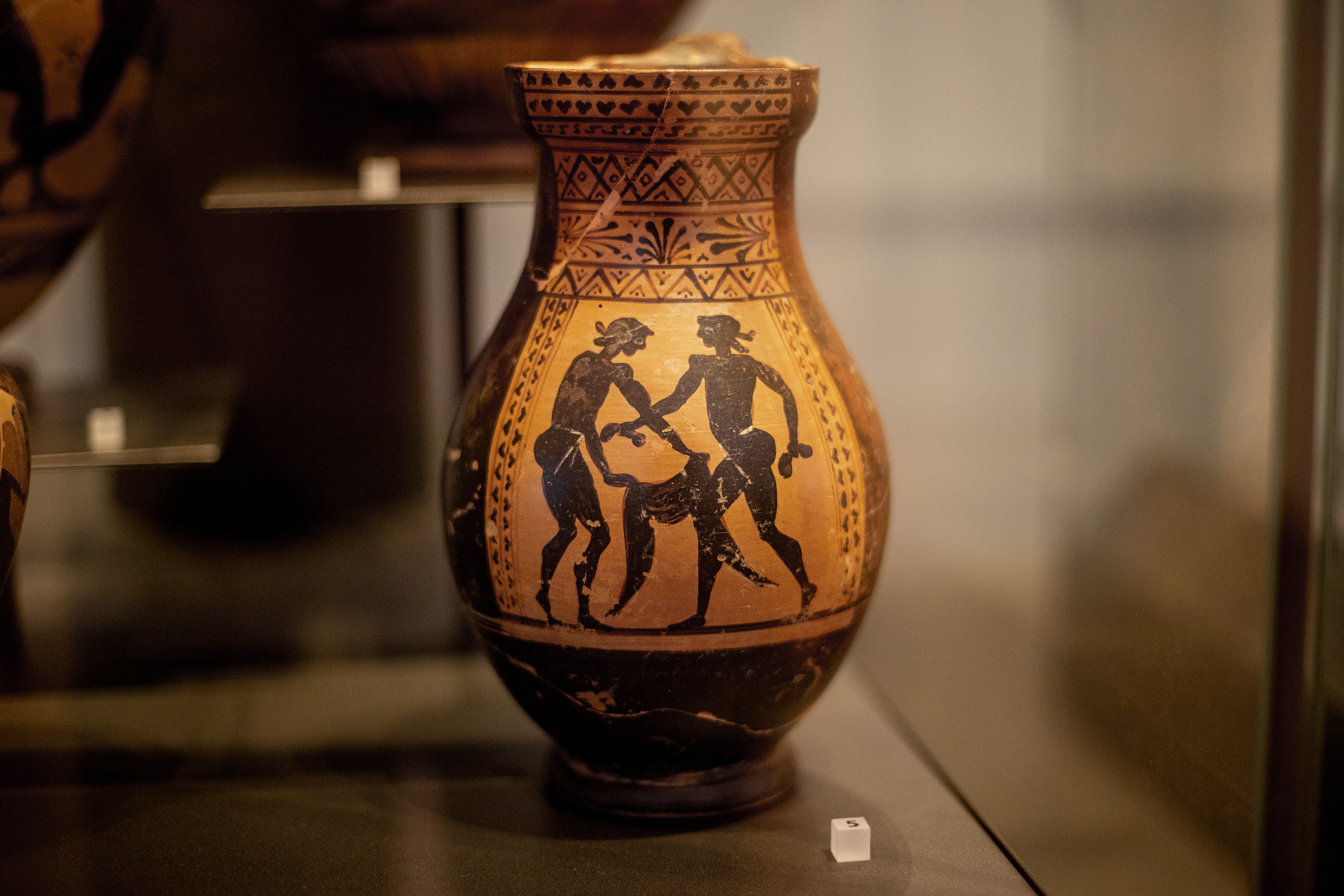
An Etruscan vase

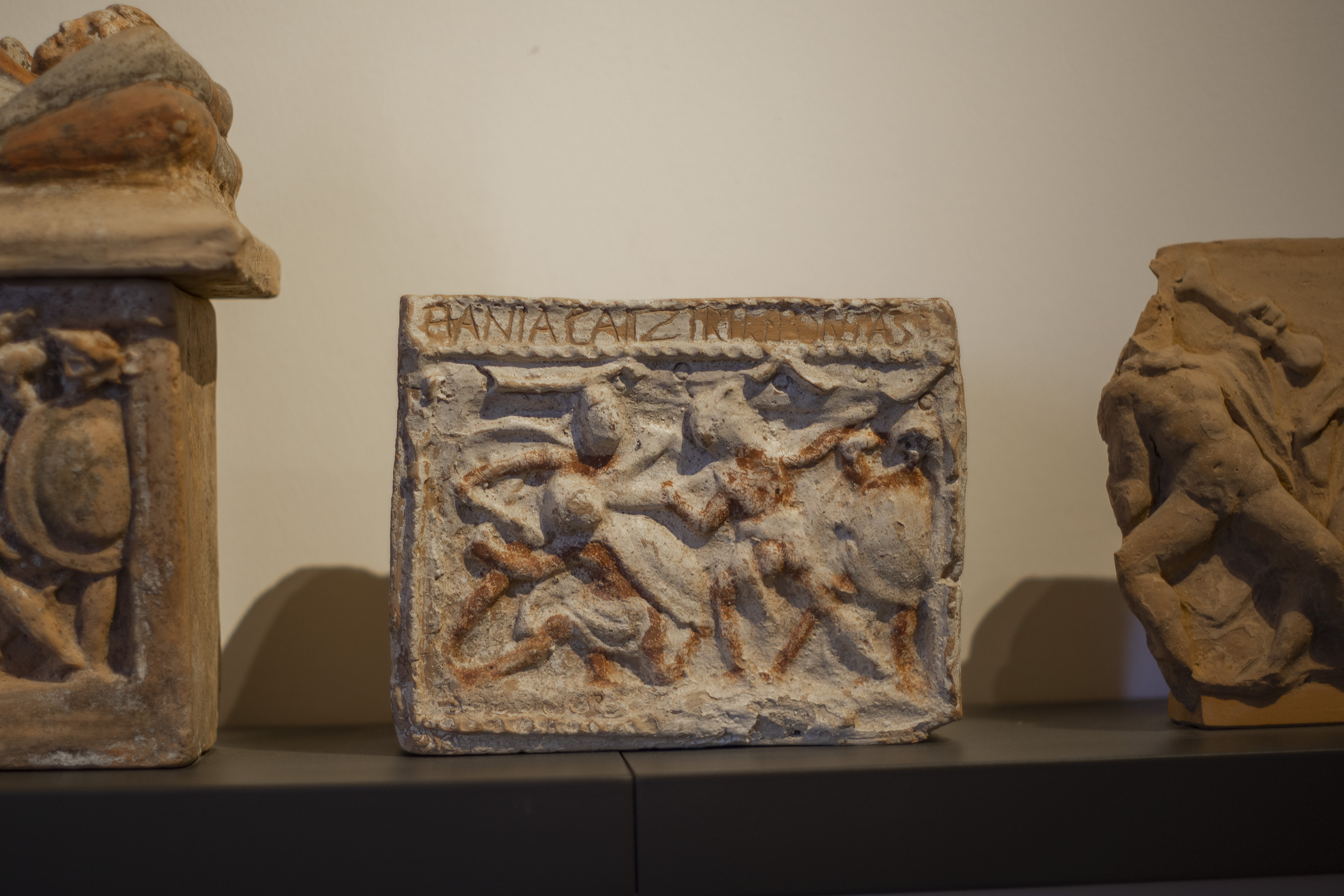
An Etruscan urn

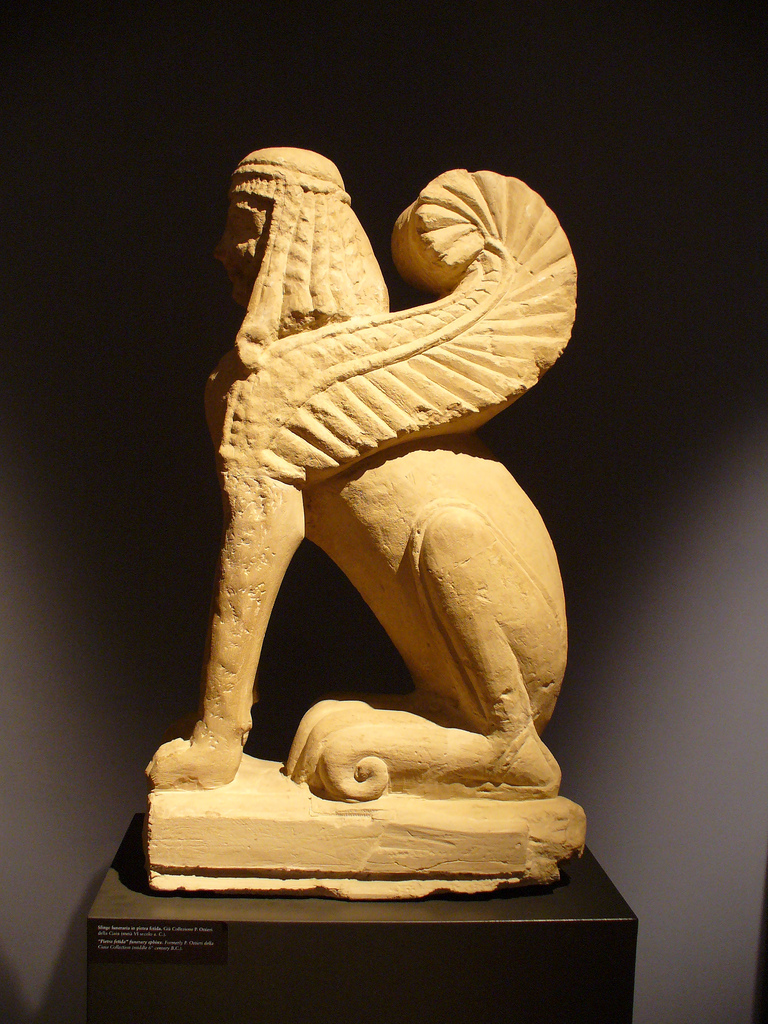
An Etruscan phoenix
