= Moiano, Città della Pieve =

Moiano
- Frazione
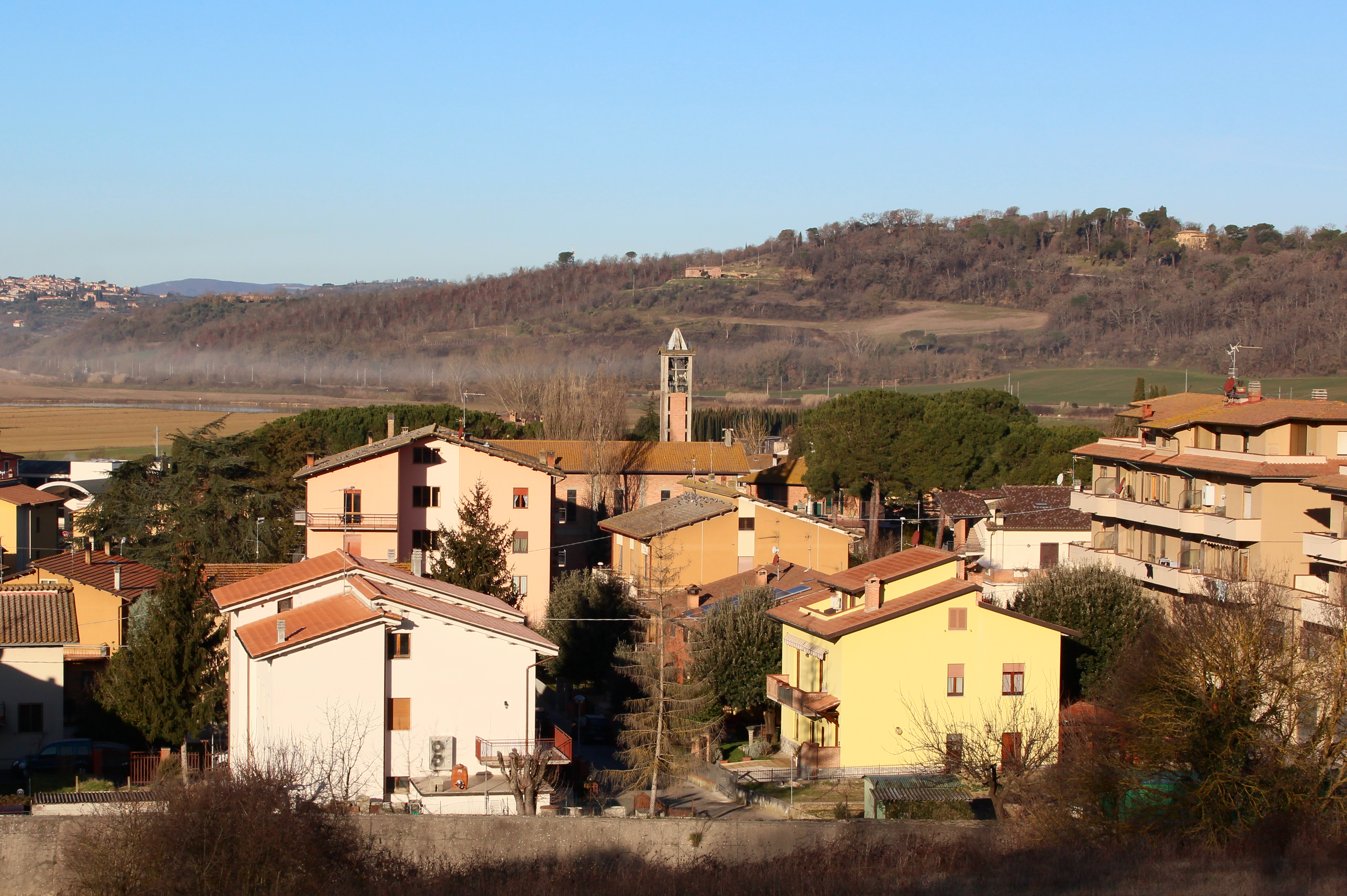
- Moiano

- Location within Italy
- Coordinates: 43°00′49″N 12°01′00″E
- Country: Italy
- Region: Umbria
- Province: Perugia
- Comune: Città della Pieve
- Elevation: 261 m (856 ft)

Population (2001)
  - Total: 815
- Time zone: UTC+1 (CET)
  - Summer (DST): UTC+2 (CEST)
- Postcode: 06062
- Area code: 0578

Moiano is a frazione of the comune of Città della Pieve in the Province of Perugia, Umbria, central Italy. It stands at an elevation of 261 metres above sea level. At the time of the Istat census of 2001 it had 815 inhabitants.

Churches in Moiano

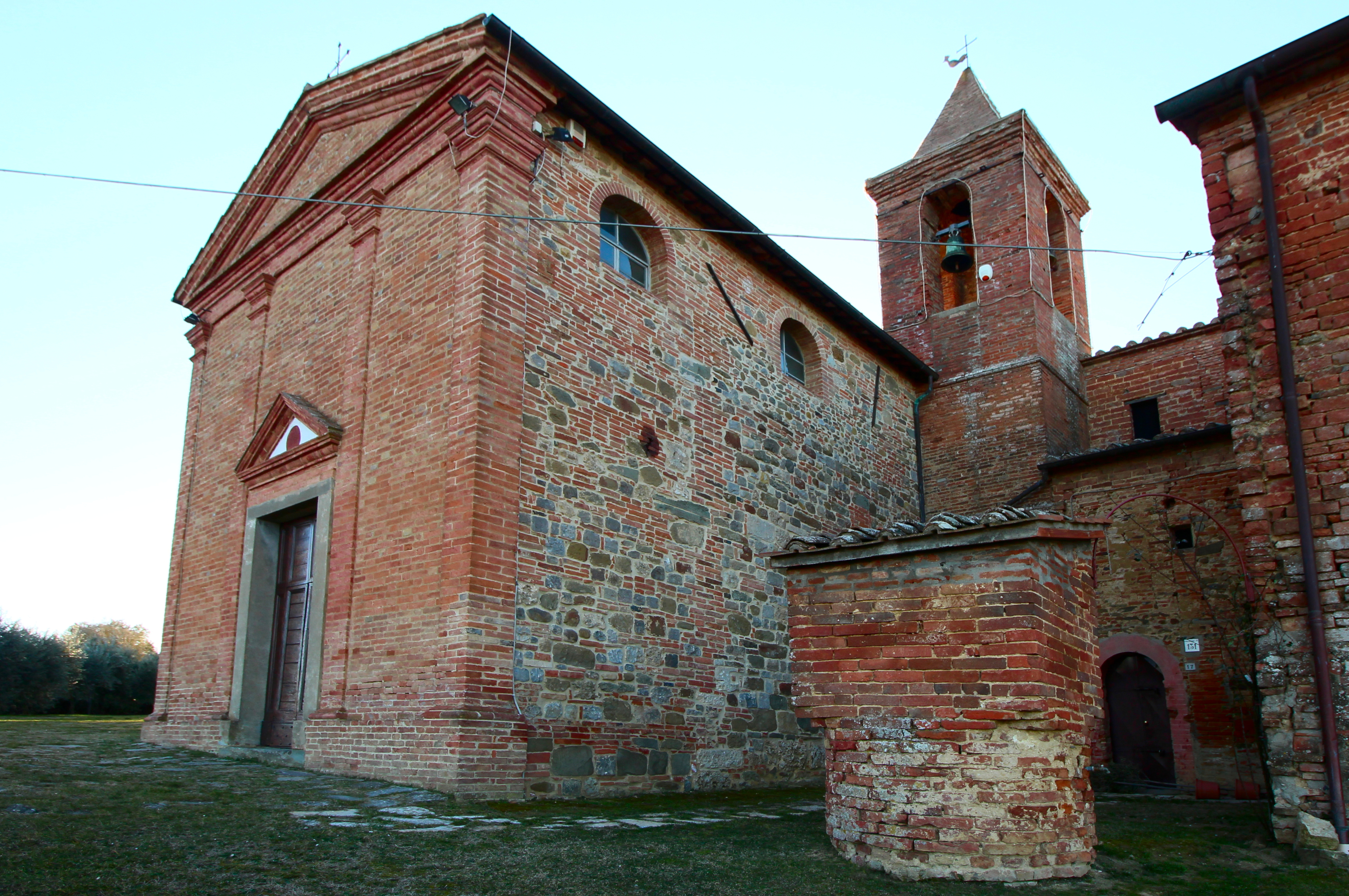
San Biagio in Caticciano

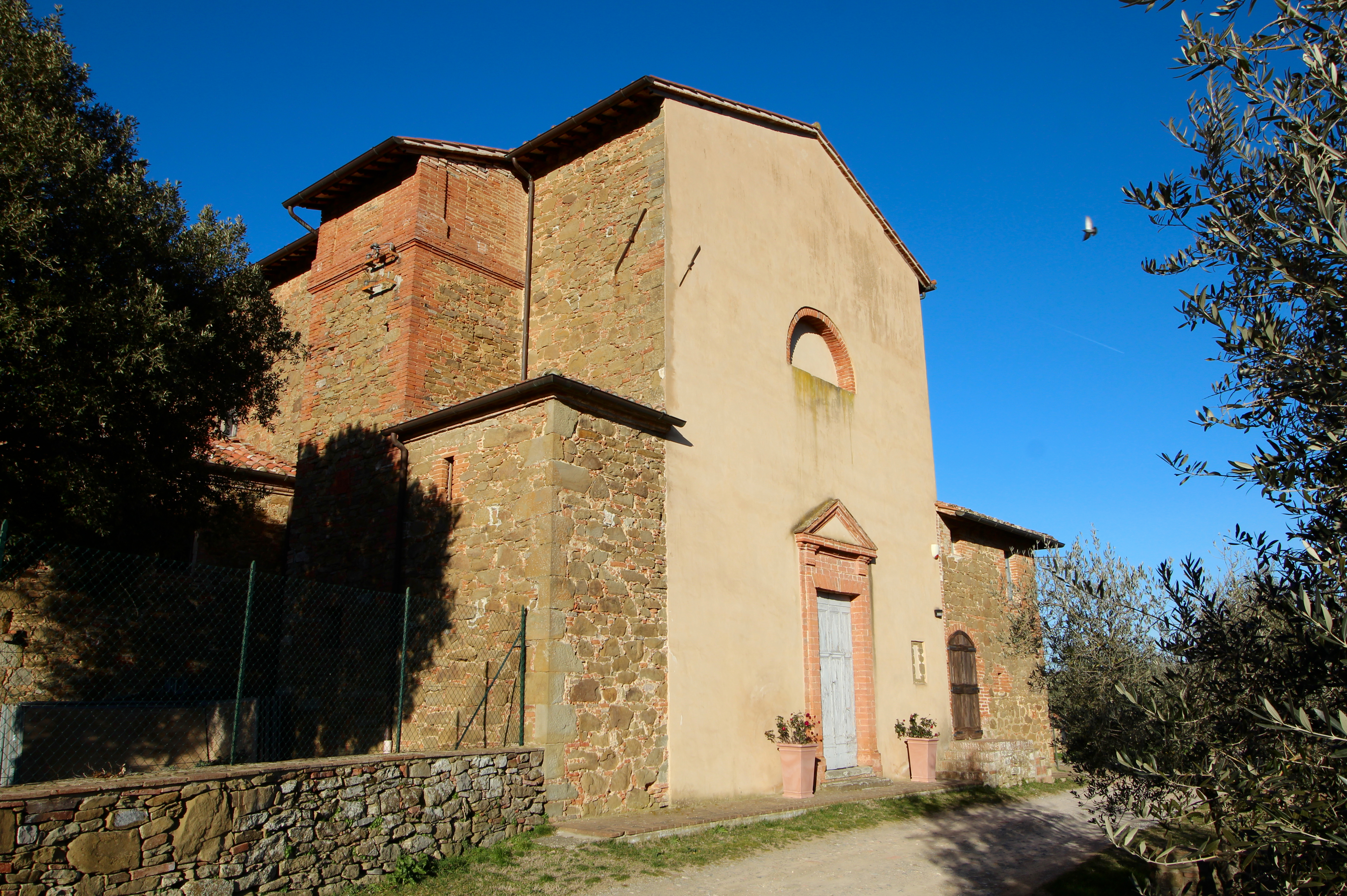
San Donato in Ravigliano
