= Chiusi =

- Comune
- Città di Chiusi
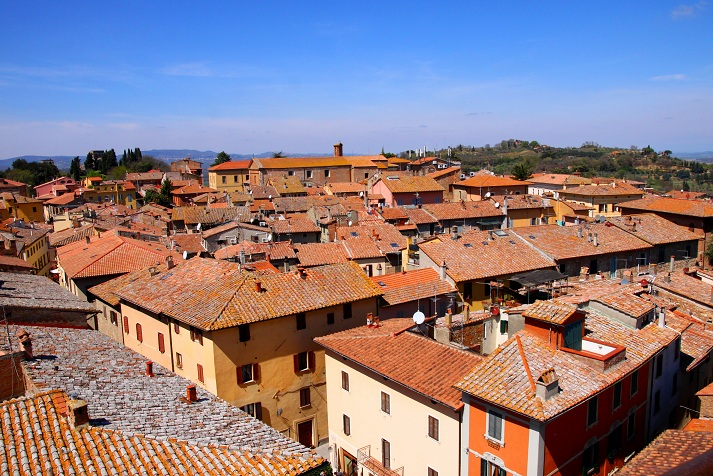

- Coat of arms

- Location within Italy Location within Tuscany
- Coordinates: 43°01′N 11°57′E
- Country: Italy
- Region: Tuscany
- Province: Siena (SI)
- Frazioni: Chiusi Scalo, Macciano, Montallese, Querce al Pino

Government
  - Mayor: Gianluca Sonnini

Area
  - Total: 58.15 km^{2} (22.45 sq mi)
- Elevation: 398 m (1,306 ft)

Population (31 December 2017)
  - Total: 8,558
  - Density: 147.2/km^{2} (381.2/sq mi)
- Demonym: Chiusini
- Time zone: UTC+1 (CET)
  - Summer (DST): UTC+2 (CEST)
- Postal code: 53043, 53044, 53040
- Dialing code: 0578
- Patron saint: St. Mustiola and St. Secondianus
- Saint day: 17 June
- Website: Official website

Chiusi (Etruscan: Clevsin; Umbrian: Camars; Ancient Greek: Klysion, Κλύσιον; Latin: Clusium) is a town and comune in the province of Siena, Tuscany, Italy.

== History ==
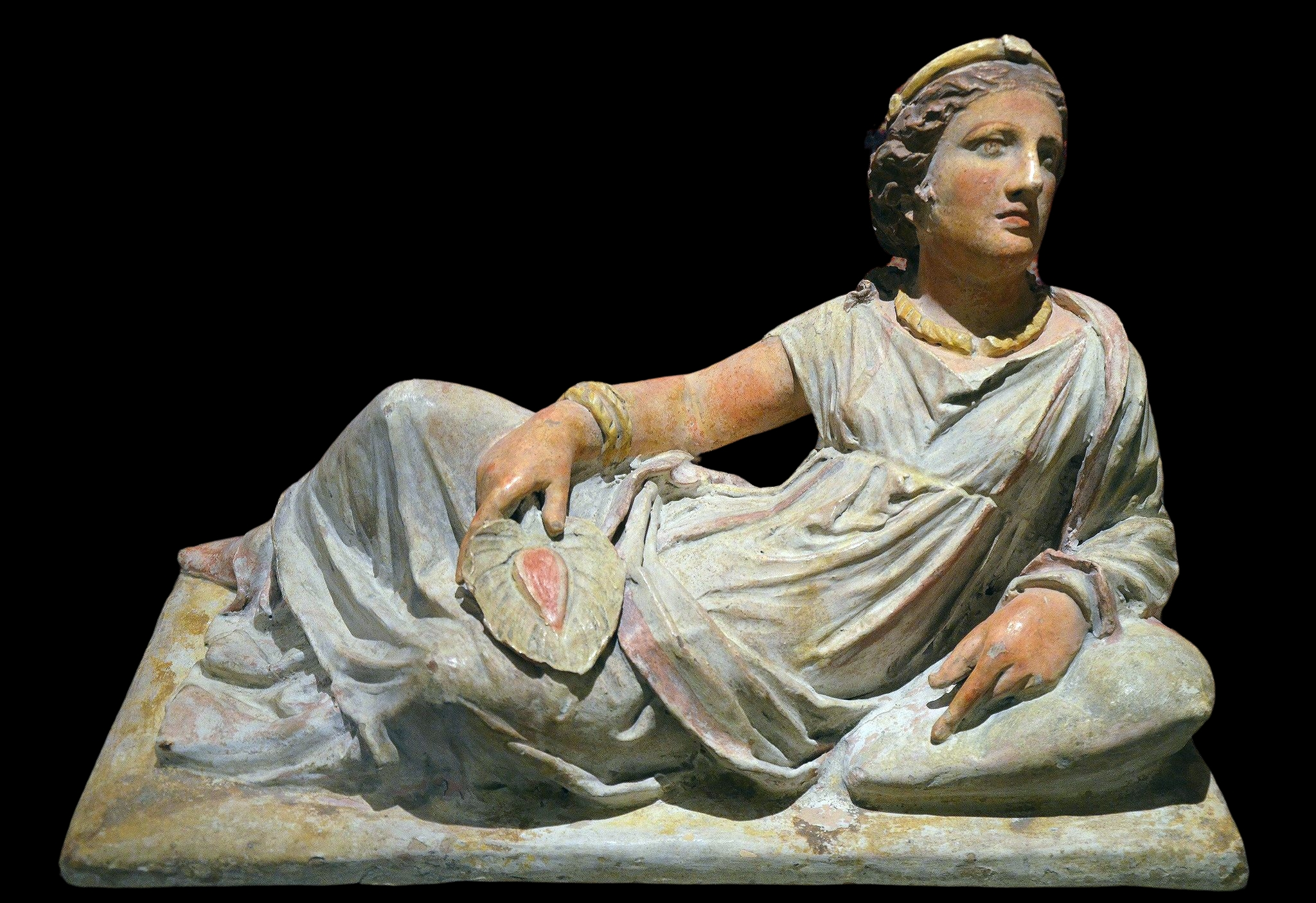
Figure from Chiusi in Badisches Landesmuseum Karlsruhe, Germany

Clusium (Clevsin or Camars in Etruscan) was one of the more powerful cities in the Etruscan League of twelve peoples. Chiusi came under the influence of Rome in the 3rd century BC and was involved in the Social War. According to a Roman historical tradition Arruns of Clusium invited Gaul mercenaries from the Po Valley into Clusium to seek revenge for a domestic conflict concerning his wife. However the Gauls sacked the city instead and settled in the region.

In 540 AD it was occupied by the Ostrogoths and was later seat of a Lombard duchy. From the 11th century it was under the rule of the local bishop, and was later contended for by Orvieto and, from 1231, Siena, belonging to the latter until 1556, when it was annexed to the Grand Duchy of Tuscany.

The region was devastated by malaria in the Middle Ages, and did not recover until the Valdichiana was drained in the 18th century.

== Main sights ==
The lowlands around Chiusi house numerous troves of tombs for this civilization. The Etruscan Museum of Chiusi is one of the most important repositories of Etruscan remains in Italy.

Other sights include:

- The Romanesque Cathedral (Duomo) of San Secondiano, built around 560 AD over a pre-existing basilica, and renovated in the 13th century. It has a nave and two aisles supported by antique columns made from marble taken from ancient buildings. The Sacrament Chapel houses a Nativity and Saints by Bernardino Fugai. It has a separated bell tower which was turned into a defence tower in 1585. Under the tower is a Roman cistern dating from the 1st century BC.
- The so-called "Labyrinth of Porsenna", a series of tunnels under the town, built in the 6th-5th century BC and probably utilized in Etruscan-Roman times for drainage of rain waters. According to Pliny the Elder (Naturalis historia, XXXVI, XIX, 91-93), the Labyrinth was part of a monument including the sepulchre of the King Porsenna.
- National Archaeological Museum of Chiusi

== Transportation ==
Chiusi is served by an interchange of the Autostrada A1. It is also served by Chiusi-Chianciano Terme station on the Florence–Rome railway, which connects Chiusi to major cities in Italy.

== Twin towns ==
- Andrézieux-Bouthéon, France
- Neu Isenburg, Germany

== See also ==
- Lars Porsena
- Tomb of Lars Porsena
- Roman Catholic Diocese of Chiusi-Pienza
- Lago di Chiusi
