= Macciano =

- Frazione
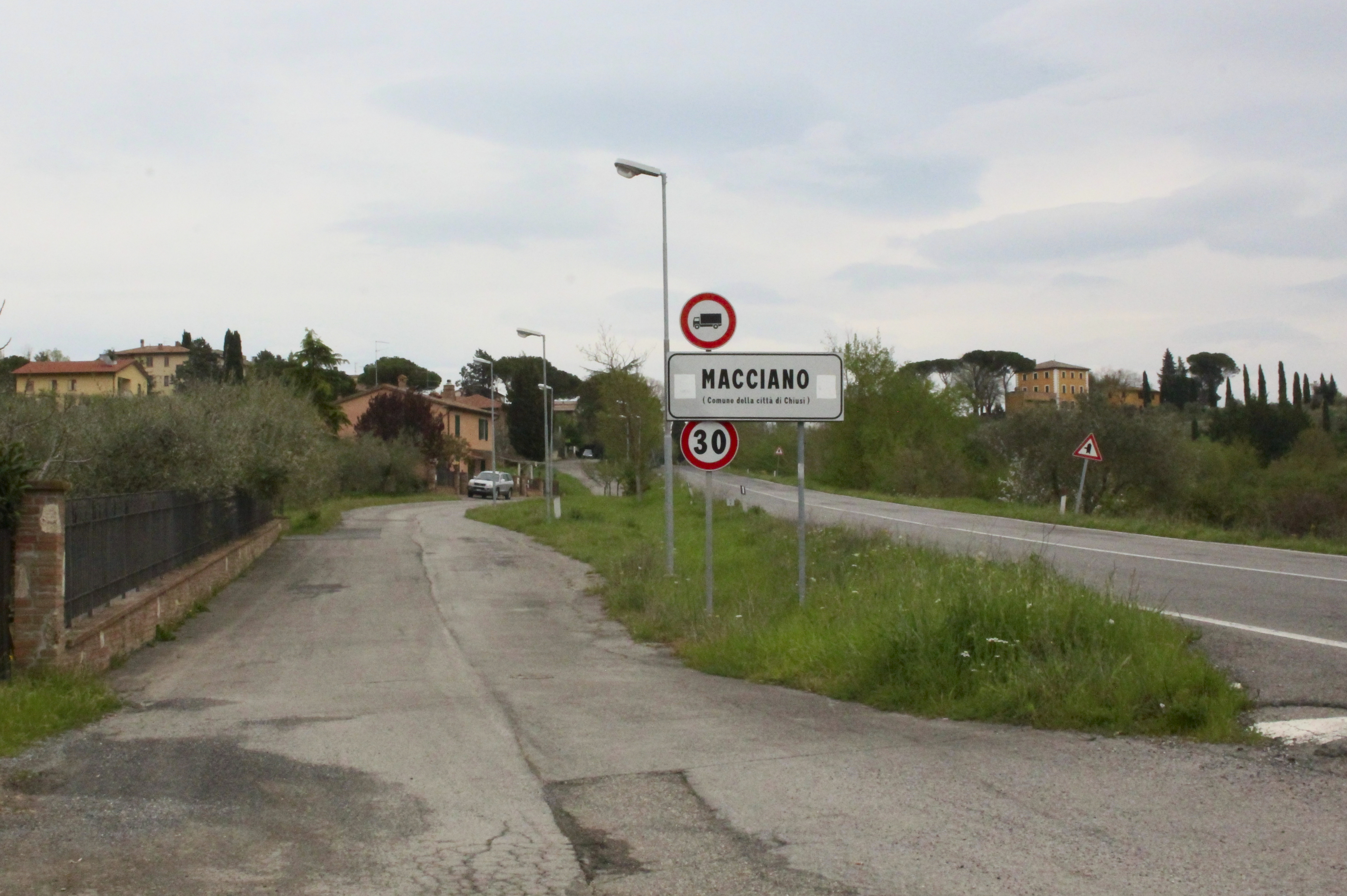
- Macciano, April 2018

- Location of Macciano in Italy
- Coordinates: 43°2′4″N 11°53′11″E
- Country: Italy
- Region: Tuscany
- Province: Siena (SI)
- Comune: Chiusi
- Elevation: 335 m (1,099 ft)

Population (2011)
  - Total: 13
- Time zone: UTC+1 (CET)
  - Summer (DST): UTC+2 (CEST)

Macciano is a village in Tuscany, central Italy, administratively a frazione of the comune of Chiusi, in the province of Siena. At the time of the 2001 census, its population was 54.
