= Montallese =

- Frazione
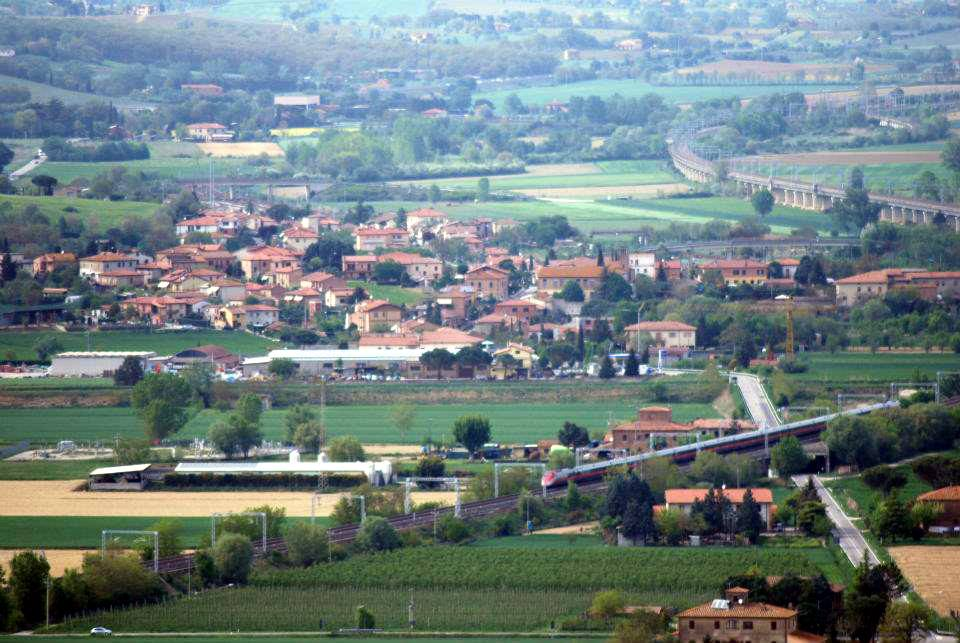
- View of Montallese

- Location of Montallese in Italy
- Coordinates: 43°3′31″N 11°54′53″E
- Country: Italy
- Region: Tuscany
- Province: Siena (SI)
- Comune: Chiusi
- Elevation: 263 m (863 ft)

Population (2011)
  - Total: 529
- Demonym: Montallesani
- Time zone: UTC+1 (CET)
  - Summer (DST): UTC+2 (CEST)

Montallese is a village in Tuscany, central Italy, administratively a frazione of the comune of Chiusi, province of Siena. At the time of the 2001 census its population was 559.
