= Querce al Pino =

- Frazione
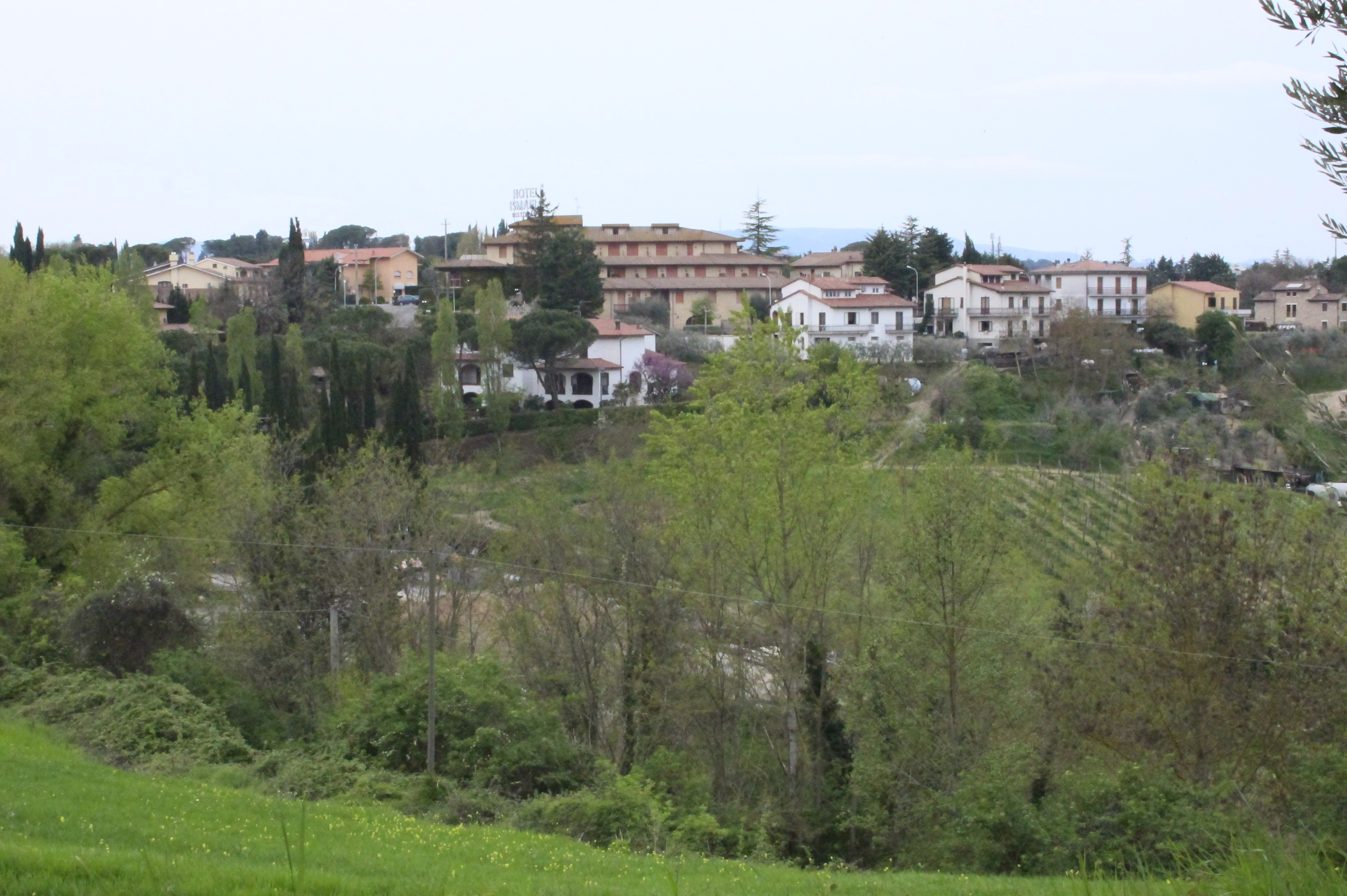
- View of Querce al Pino

- Location of Querce al Pino in Italy
- Coordinates: 43°1′1″N 11°54′24″E
- Country: Italy
- Region: Tuscany
- Province: Siena (SI)
- Comune: Chiusi
- Elevation: 328 m (1,076 ft)

Population (2011)
  - Total: 105
- Time zone: UTC+1 (CET)
  - Summer (DST): UTC+2 (CEST)

Querce al Pino is a village in Tuscany, central Italy, administratively a frazione of the comune of Chiusi, province of Siena. At the time of the 2001 census its population was 104.
