= Lago di Chiusi =

Lake in Tuscany, Italy

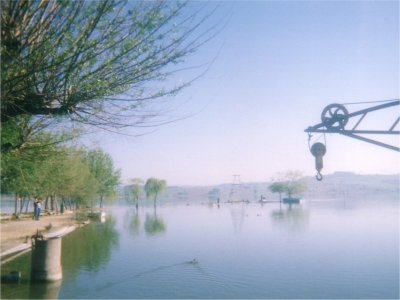

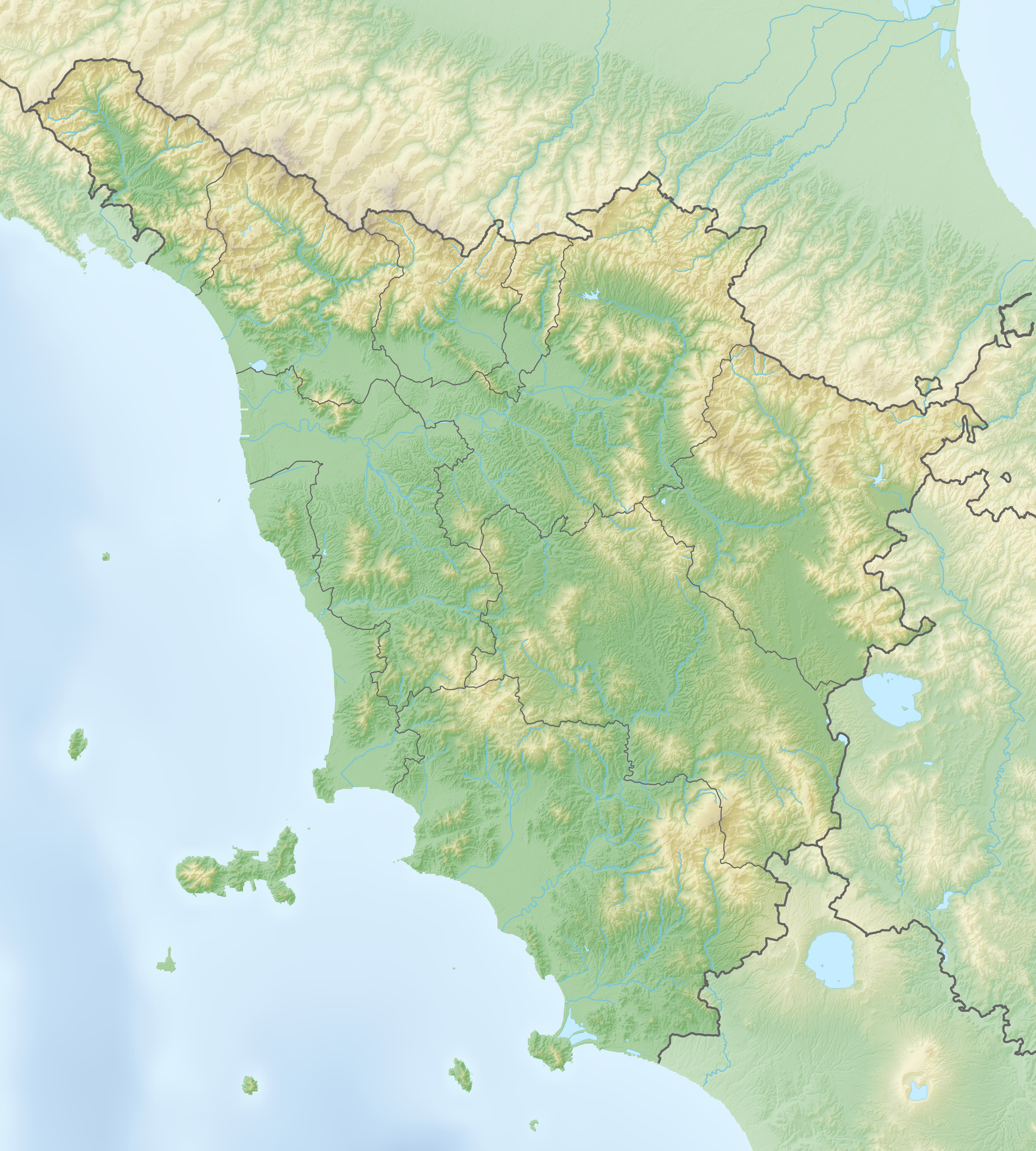
- Location within Tuscany
- Location: Province of Siena, Tuscany
- Coordinates: 43°3′22.11″N 11°57′55.79″E
- Primary inflows: Tresa
- Primary outflows: Canale Maestro della Chiana
- Basin countries: Italy
- Surface area: 3.87 km^{2} (1.49 sq mi)
- Surface elevation: 251 m (823 ft)

Lago di Chiusi is a lake in the Province of Siena, Tuscany, Italy. At an elevation of 251 m, its surface area is 3.87 km².

Like other lakes in Etruria, such as Lake Bolsena and Lake Vico, it was formed from a volcanic crater.
