= Alessandro Guarini =

Italian Renaissance humanist

- Born: c. 1563; Ferrara, Duchy of Ferrara
- Died: August 15, 1636; Ferrara, Papal States
- Burial place: Santa Maria degli Angeli (Ferrara)
- Occupations: Poet; Renaissance humanist; Diplomat
- Spouse: Virginia Palmiroli (m. 1586)
- Father: Giovanni Battista Guarini

Academic background
- Education: University of Perugia
- Influences: Dante Alighieri; Torquato Tasso

Academic work
- Era: Renaissance
- Institutions: University of Ferrara

Alessandro Guarini (c. 1563 – 15 August 1636) was an Italian writer, jurist and diplomat. He is famous for his dialogue Il farnetico savio overo il Tasso (1610).

== Biography ==
Alessandro was the eldest of the four sons of Giovanni Battista Guarini, author of the Pastor fido, and Taddea Guarini (née Bendidio). He belonged to the family established in Ferrara by his ancestor Guarino da Verona. The date of his birth is uncertain. Sent at an early age to study at the University of Perugia, he promptly returned to Ferrara, complaining of poor health and bad treatment at the hands of his fellow students. His father commanded him to go back to Perugia. He respectfully declined (as he says), and had finally to take refuge from his angry parent at the home of an uncle at Parma. A reconciliation was effected in 1584. Two years later, his father married him to a wealthy heiress, Virginia Palmiroli, whose father was recently dead, and himself took over the management of her property. Soon, the young couple found courage to dispute this arrangement, and were driven from the house. They resorted to the law; but Duke Alfonso II d'Este, to avoid scandal, appointed an arbiter. Seemingly, his decision was too favorable to the son, for the old poet soon after gave up his offices at Court and retired from Ferrara. In 1593, father and son once more were reconciled in a meeting at the Court of the Gonzaga at Mantua. Alessandro soon after began to reside in Padua. Trouble again broke out in 1601. This time Alessandro left Italy, accompanying Guido Bentivoglio to Brussels; but he was compelled to hasten back to meet the lawsuit his father had set in motion against him in his absence. In 1610, Giovanni Battista Guarini published a pamphlet attacking his son. Alessandro had won the suit.

Alessandro Guarini seems at one time to have been professor of literae humaniores in Ferrara, and Secretary to the Duke. He was one of the founders of the Accademia degli Intrepidi of Ferrara. He died in Ferrara on August 15, 1636.

== Works ==
Besides minor verses, which appear never to have been collected, he published a tragicomedy, Bradamante Gelosa (Ferrara, 1616), and three prose works: a Trattato del vero, e real fondamento della catolica fede (1635), an Apologia di Cesare (ibid., 1632), and Il farnetico savio overo il Tasso (ibid., 1610), a dialogue on literary theory between the poet Cesare Caporali and Torquato Tasso, whom Alessandro had known since his childhood. His Lettere were published in Ferrara in 1611.

== Bibliography ==
- Diffley, P. (2002). "Guarini, Alessandro". The Oxford Companion to Italian Literature. Oxford University Press.
- Tiraboschi, Girolamo (1785). Storia della letteratura italiana. Vol. VII Part III. Rome: Luigi Perego Salvioni.
- Croce, Benedetto (1931). "Alessandro Guarini storico e critico". Nuovi Saggi Sulla Letteratura Italiana del Seicento. Bari: Laterza: 106–114.
- Di Benedetto, Arnaldo (1967). "Un paragrafo della storia della cultura ferrarese tra Cinque e Seicento: Alessandro Guarini". Giornale Storico della Letteratura Italiana. 144: 261–291.
- Di Benedetto, Arnaldo (1970). "Guarini, Alessandro". Enciclopedia Dantesca. Istituto dell'Enciclopedia Italiana.
- Cerroni, Monica (2003). "GUARINI, Alessandro, il Giovane". Dizionario Biografico degli Italiani (in Italian). Vol. 60: Grosso–Guglielmo da Forli. Rome: Istituto dell'Enciclopedia Italiana. ISBN 978-88-12-00032-6.
