= Panicale =

- Comune
- Comune di Panicale
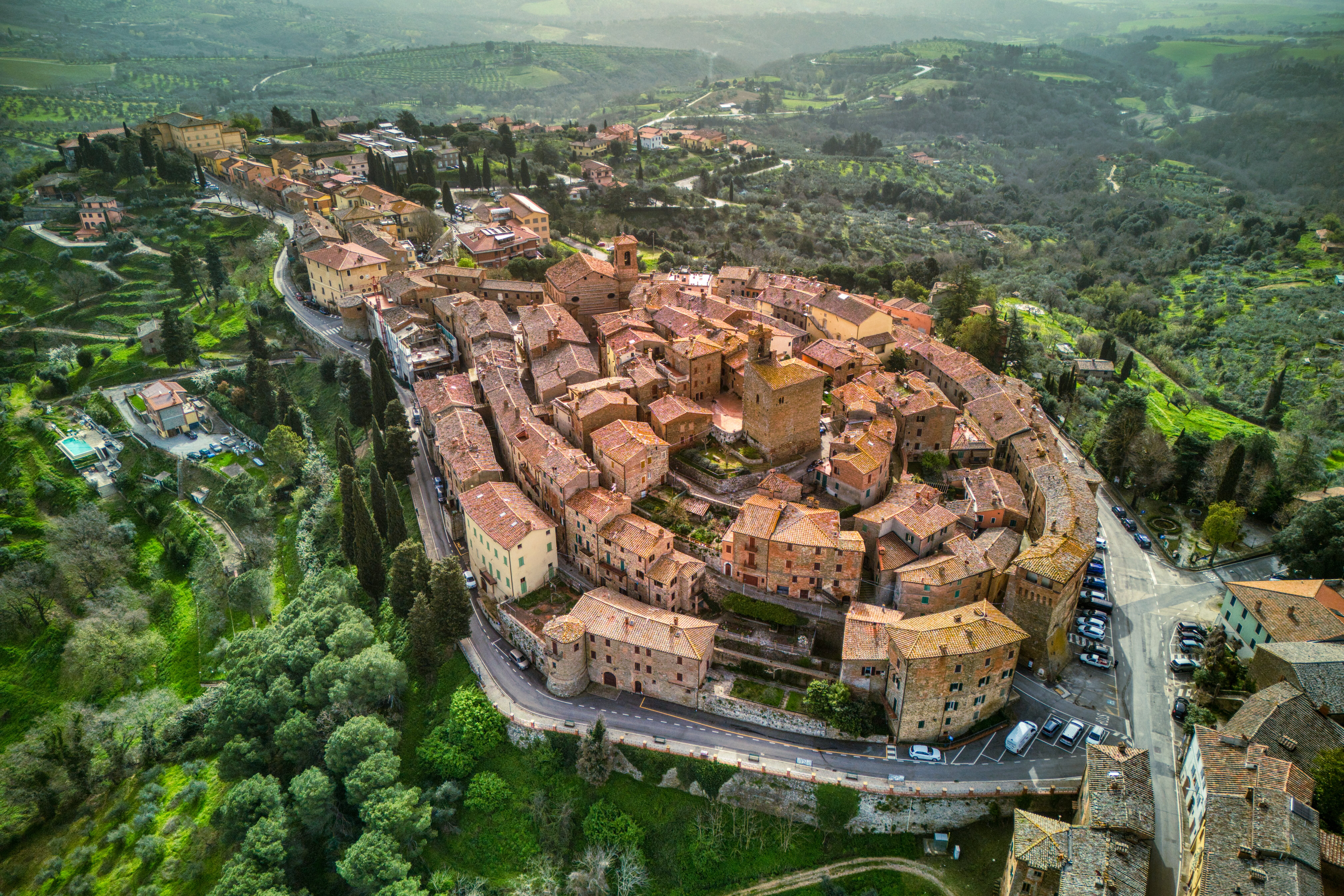
- View of Panicale

- Location within Italy Location within Umbria
- Coordinates: 43.029406°N 12.100035°E
- Country: Italy
- Region: Umbria
- Province: Province of Perugia (PG)

Government
  - Mayor: Giulio Cherubini (Partito Democratico)

Area
  - Total: 78.8 km^{2} (30.4 sq mi)
- Elevation: 441 m (1,447 ft)

Population (1 January 2025)
  - Total: 5,312
  - Density: 67.4/km^{2} (175/sq mi)
- Demonym: Panicalesi
- Time zone: UTC+1 (CET)
  - Summer (DST): UTC+2 (CEST)
- Postal code: 06064, 06068
- Dialing code: 075
- Patron saint: Michael
- Saint day: September 29
- Website: Official website

Panicale is a comune (municipality) in the Province of Perugia in the Italian region Umbria. Located on the eastern slope of Mount Petrarvella, in the southeast of Valdichiana, it overlooks Lake Trasimeno and is about 35 km from Perugia.

As of 1 January 2025, it had a population of 5,312 and an area of 78.8 km^{2}. It is one of I Borghi più belli d'Italia ("The most beautiful villages of Italy").

== Etymology ==
The origins of the name of Panicale are uncertain. A local tradition recorded in 19th century sources holds that the name derives from a temple dedicated to the god Pan, the pastoral and rustic divinity of classical mythology.

A 19th century account from Adone Palmieri attributes the name to the Achaeans, legendary founders of Perugia, who are said to have called it Pan-calon in reference to the pleasantness of its position.

== History ==
Archaeological evidence indicates that the area was already settled in the 2nd millennium BC. By the 7th century BC an Etruscan presence is documented. During the Roman period the site is believed to have hosted a military camp and to have served as a refuge during the Perusine War between Lucius Antonius and Octavian in the 1st century BC.

In 917 Berengar I confirmed the village as a fief to Marquis Uguccione II Bourbon del Monte. Various nobles of Arezzo later bore the title of Counts of Panicale. In 1037 the community achieved independence from Uguccione II, marking the emergence of a free commune.

In 1131 the settlement suffered damage during the passage of imperial troops and from subsequent factional strife and civil wars.

In the 13th century it submitted to the Signoria of Perugia, while retaining a measure of local autonomy. Civic institutions developed during this period: in 1316 the first municipal statute was compiled in Latin, and it was subsequently revised in 1356 and again in 1386.

In 1355 the Emperor Charles IV stayed overnight in Panicale while travelling from Rome to Pisa under the escort of Perugian ambassadors; on that occasion he granted the lordship to Guillaume III Roger de Beaufort, nephew of Pope Clement VI and brother of Gregory XI.

In 1416 Panicale was subjected by Braccio Fortebraccio, who retained control until 1425, when the allied forces of the Sforza and Cardinal Vitelleschi compelled him to withdraw to defend Montone.

In 1484 the municipal statute was translated into the vernacular.

In 1540, following the Salt War, Perugia was definitively subjected to the Papal State, and new legal and administrative structures were introduced.

In 1642 the army of the Duke of Parma, aided by troops of the Grand Duke of Tuscany, sacked Panicale and demolished its fortress and fortifications. From that time the town experienced a documented phase of economic and civic decline.

The late 18th and early 19th centuries were marked by the upheavals associated with Jacobin and Napoleonic rule, which temporarily interrupted papal authority. In 1817 the commune was placed under the government of Castiglione del Lago. Between 1827 and 1833 it held the status of podesteria. Throughout the 19th century it formed part of the District of Perugia, and in 1860 it was annexed to the Kingdom of Italy.

In 1859 Panicale, including its hamlets, had a total population of 2,496 inhabitants. Of these, 437 resided in the main town and 2,059 in the surrounding parishes and countryside.

== Geography ==
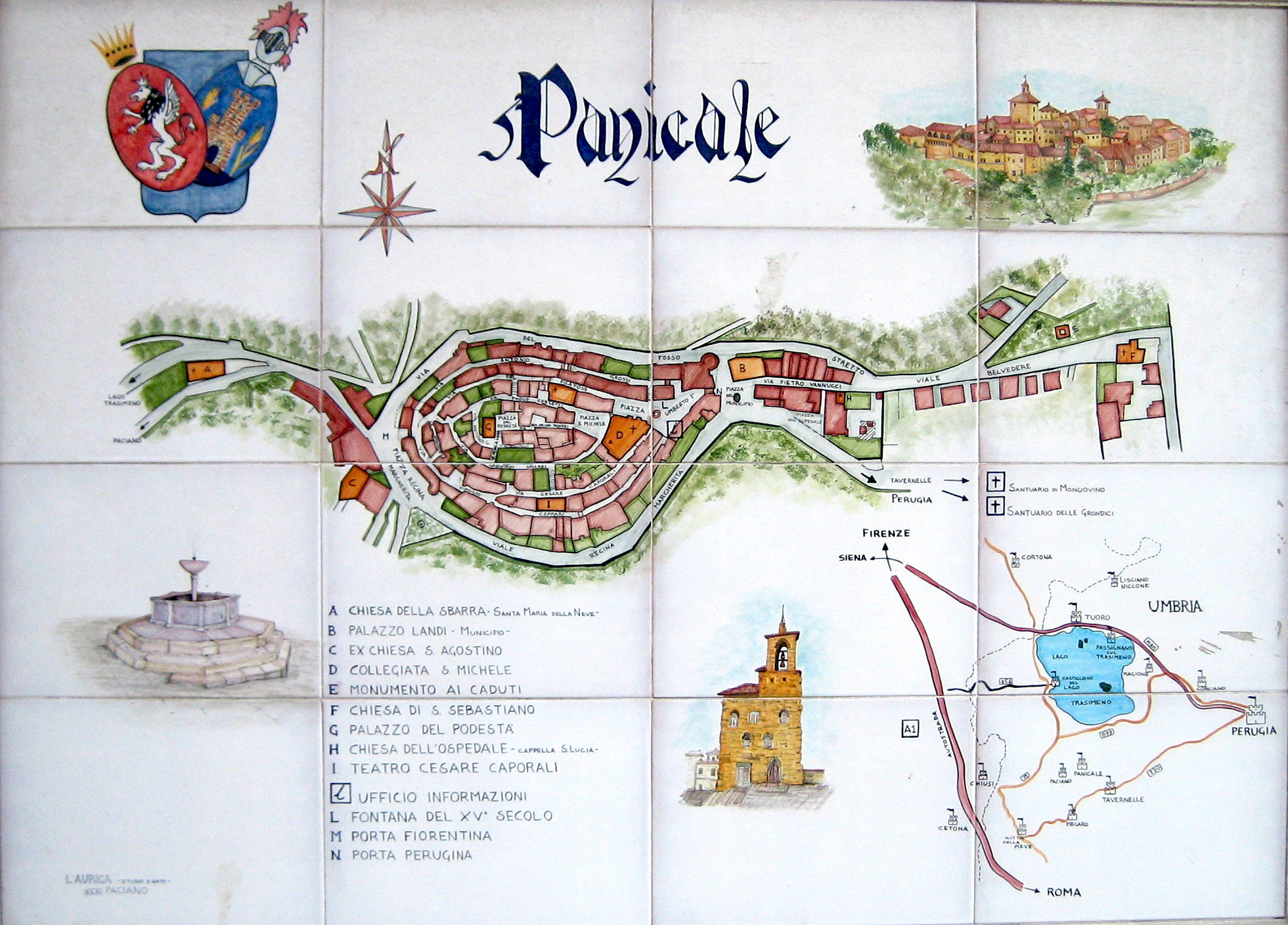
Ceramic-tile map of Panicale

Panicale stands on a hill overlooking the surrounding countryside near the southern shore of Lake Trasimeno. The town has an oval layout and is encircled by fortifications with two principal gates: Porta Perugina to the east, and Porta Fiorentina to the west. From its elevated position, Panicale commands extensive views, particularly toward the north-west and north, including Lake Trasimeno at a distance of about 3 miles (4.8 km), the plain of Castiglione del Lago, the Valdichiana, and as far as Cortona, Montepulciano, and Chiusi.

The climate is described as temperate, though influenced by the proximity of the lake.

Panicale borders the following municipalities: Castiglione del Lago, Magione, Paciano, Perugia and Piegaro.

=== Subdivisions ===
The municipality includes the localities of Casa Paolinami, Casalini, Cerreto, Chiesa Mongiovino Vecchio, Colgiordano, Colle Calzolaro, Gioveto, Lemura, Macereto Basso, Migliaiolo, Mirabella, Missiano, Olmini, Palazzi, Panicale, Potassa, San Pietro, Tavernelle, Terrazzella, Via delle Parti, Via Larga.

In 2021, 841 people lived in rural dispersed dwellings not assigned to any named locality. At the time, the most populous locality was Tavernelle (2,931), while Panicale proper had a population of 477.

== Religion and culture ==
=== San Michele Arcangelo ===
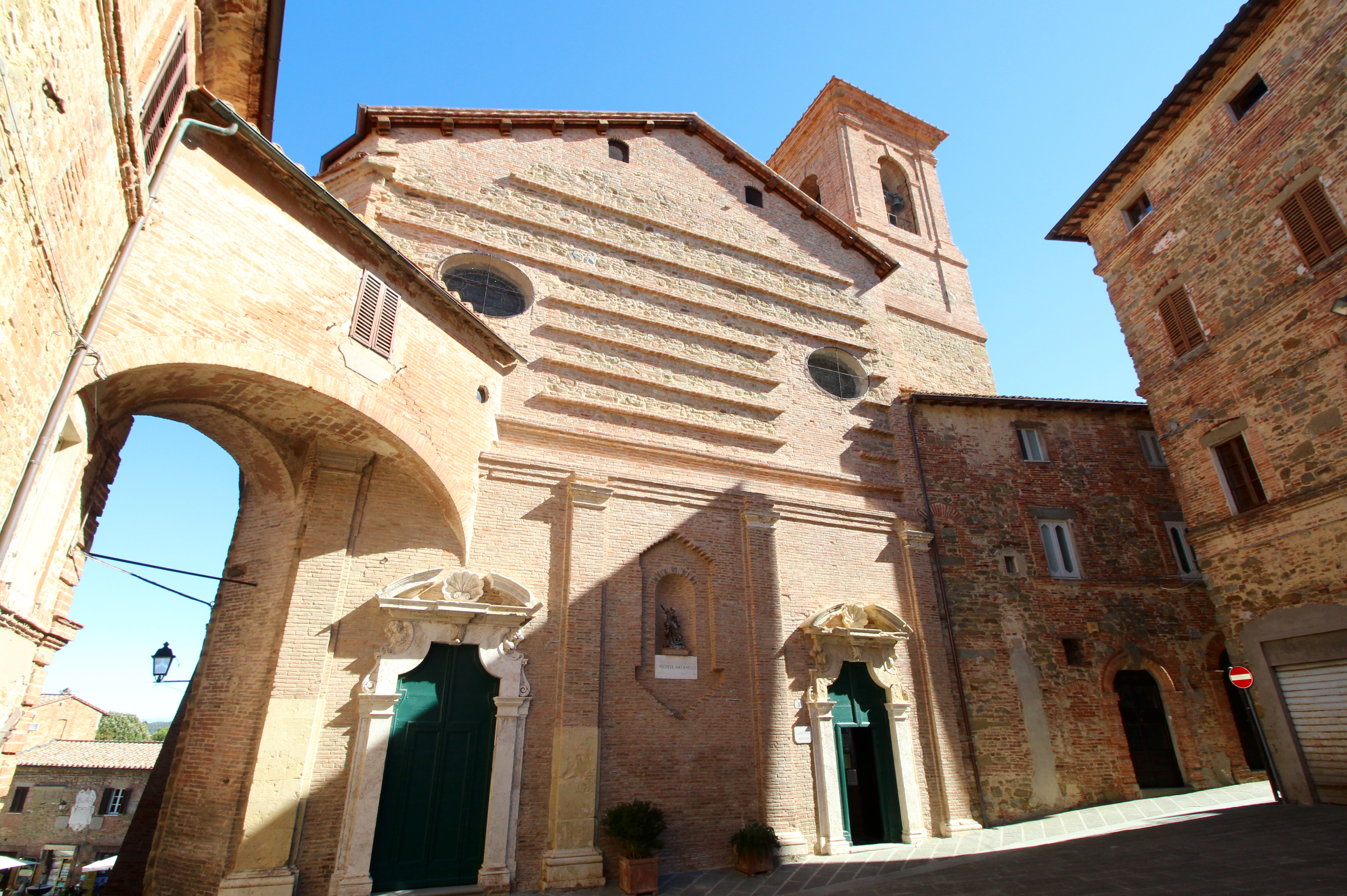
Church of San Michele Arcangelo

The collegiate church of San Michele Arcangelo is the parish church of Panicale. It was built in 1618 over a pre-existing Romanesque church, from which it still retains the façade, and it was restored in 1696. The building is largely of brick, with door frames in travertine and sandstone, and a sandstone tabernacle set on the rear side. Inside it preserves a painting of the Madonna and Saints by Perugino, a panel by Giovan Battista Caporali and a Nativity scene with God the Father.

The church contains an organ built in 1836 by Angelo Morettini of Perugia. The body of Saint Pellegrino, venerated as the town's patron, is preserved there in a gilded urn.

=== San Sebastiano ===
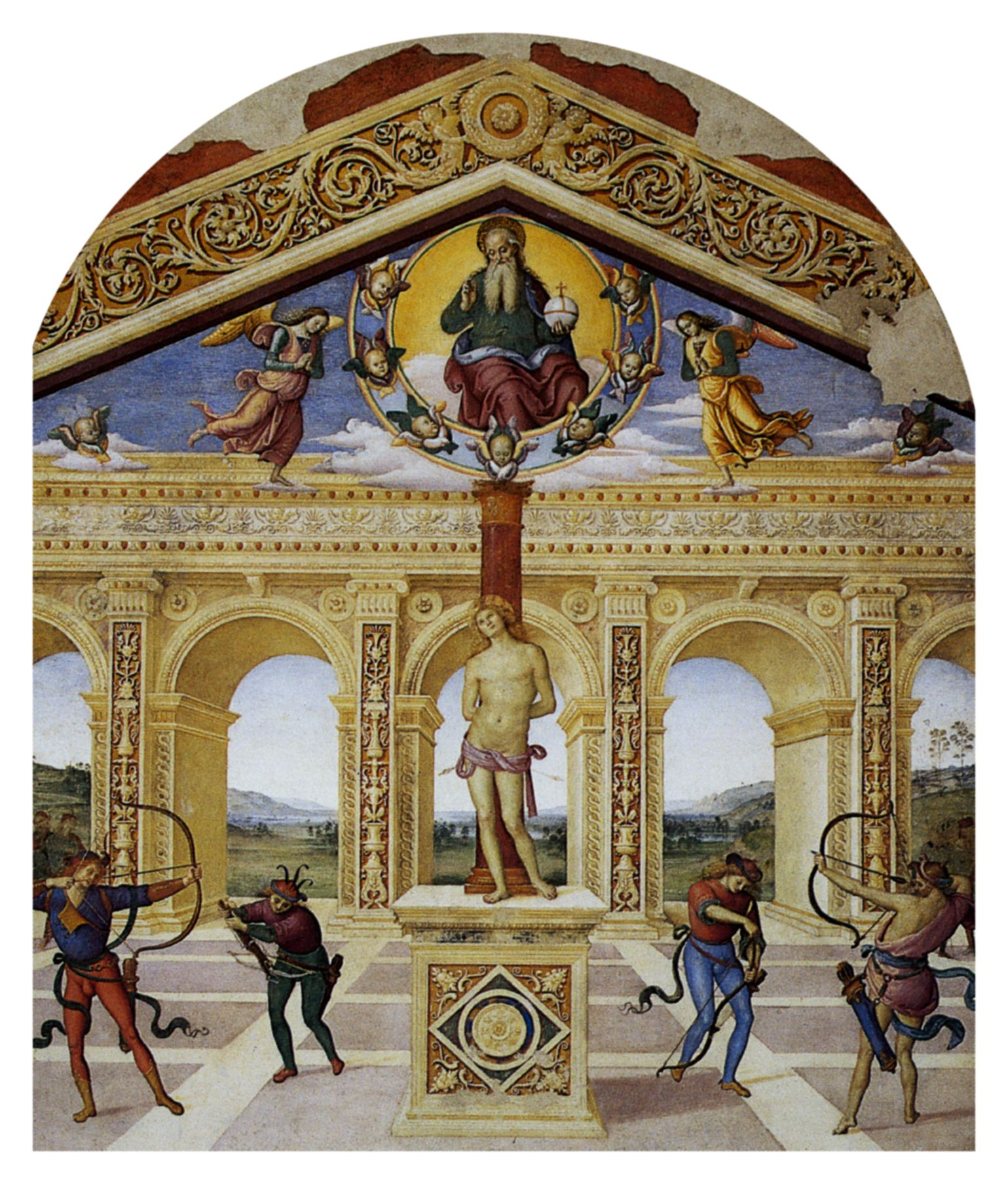
The Martyrdom of St Sebastian (1505) by Perugino

The church of San Sebastiano was built between the late 14th century and the 15th century and was reshaped into its present form in 1623, when it was furnished with capitals, cornices, two altars and two small choir galleries.

The church contains a fresco of The Martyrdom of Saint Sebastian (1505), considered among the masterpieces of Perugino. The church also contains Madonna enthroned with musical angels. On the exterior, terracotta plaques on the upper left side bear the dates 1690 and 1725, while the outer wall of the garden area bears the date 1692.

=== Sanctuary of the Madonna di Mongiovino ===
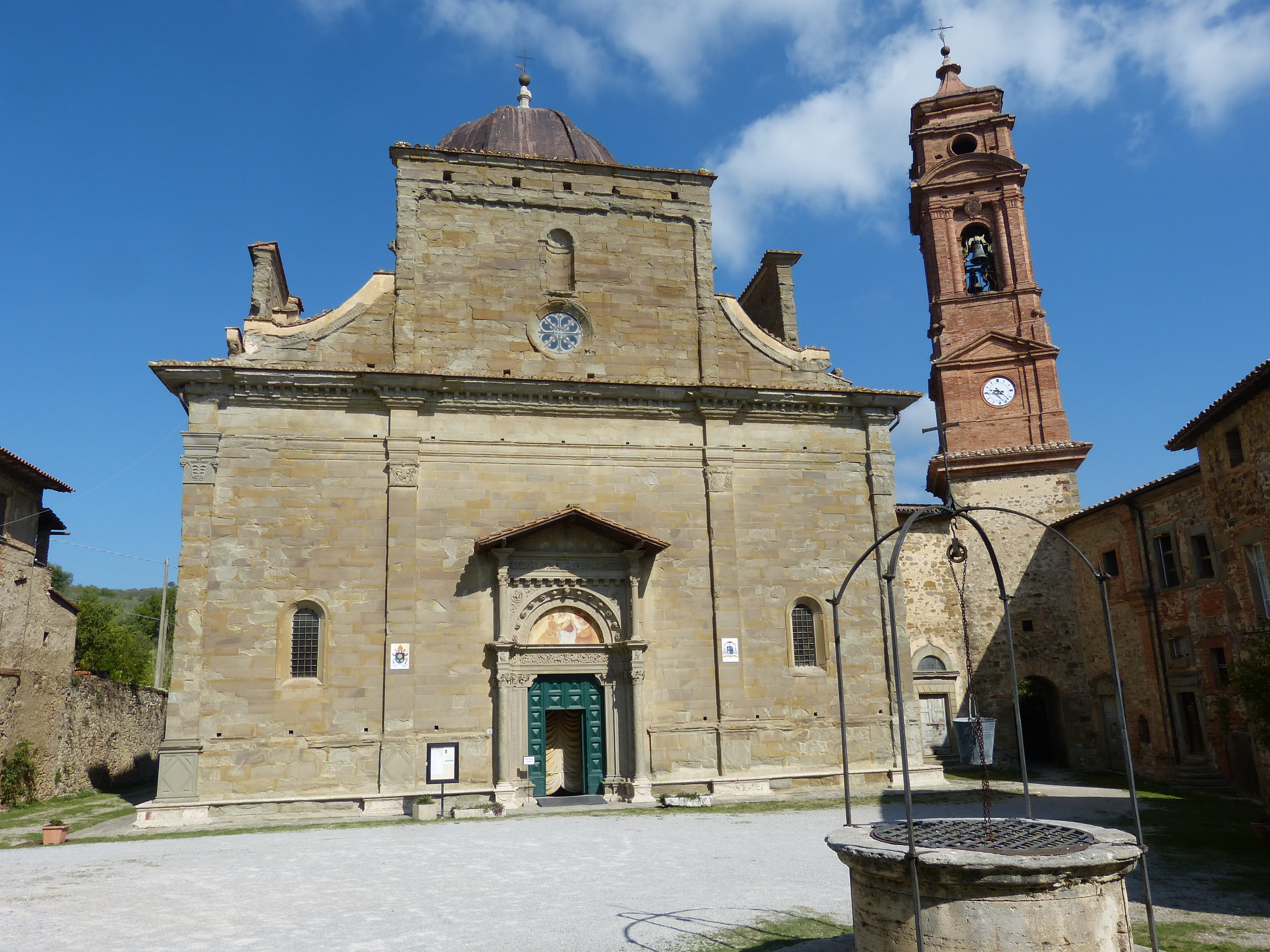
Madonna di Mongivino

The Sanctuary of the Madonna di Mongiovino lies about 7 kilometres (4.3 mi) from Panicale, just below the castle of Mongiovino. It was built in 1524 by Rocco da Vicenza to replace an older chapel that housed a miraculous image of the Madonna. Built in sandstone, it has a Greek-cross plan and an octagonal dome supported internally by four pillars. Its portals are attributed to Rocco himself and to Giuliano da Verona, Bernardino da Siena and Lorenzo da Carrara.

The interior is arranged around a square plan with four corner chapels and a main chapel containing the miraculous painting. Among the works mentioned are a Deposition from the Cross by Arrigo Fiammingo, a Resurrection by Nicolò Pomarancio, and an Coronation of Mary painted on the dome by Mattia Battini, alongside other sacred images including the miraculous Madonna and Child dated to the 14th century. The high altar in stone and terracotta statues placed in the organ niches, attributed to Bevignate da Perugia and Arrigo Fiammingo, are also noted.

The interior includes notable liturgical silverwork, among them a finely worked silver cross traditionally attributed to Rosso, and chalices bearing the arms of the Vibi family dating from the 15th century.

=== Sanctuary of the Madonna delle Grondici ===
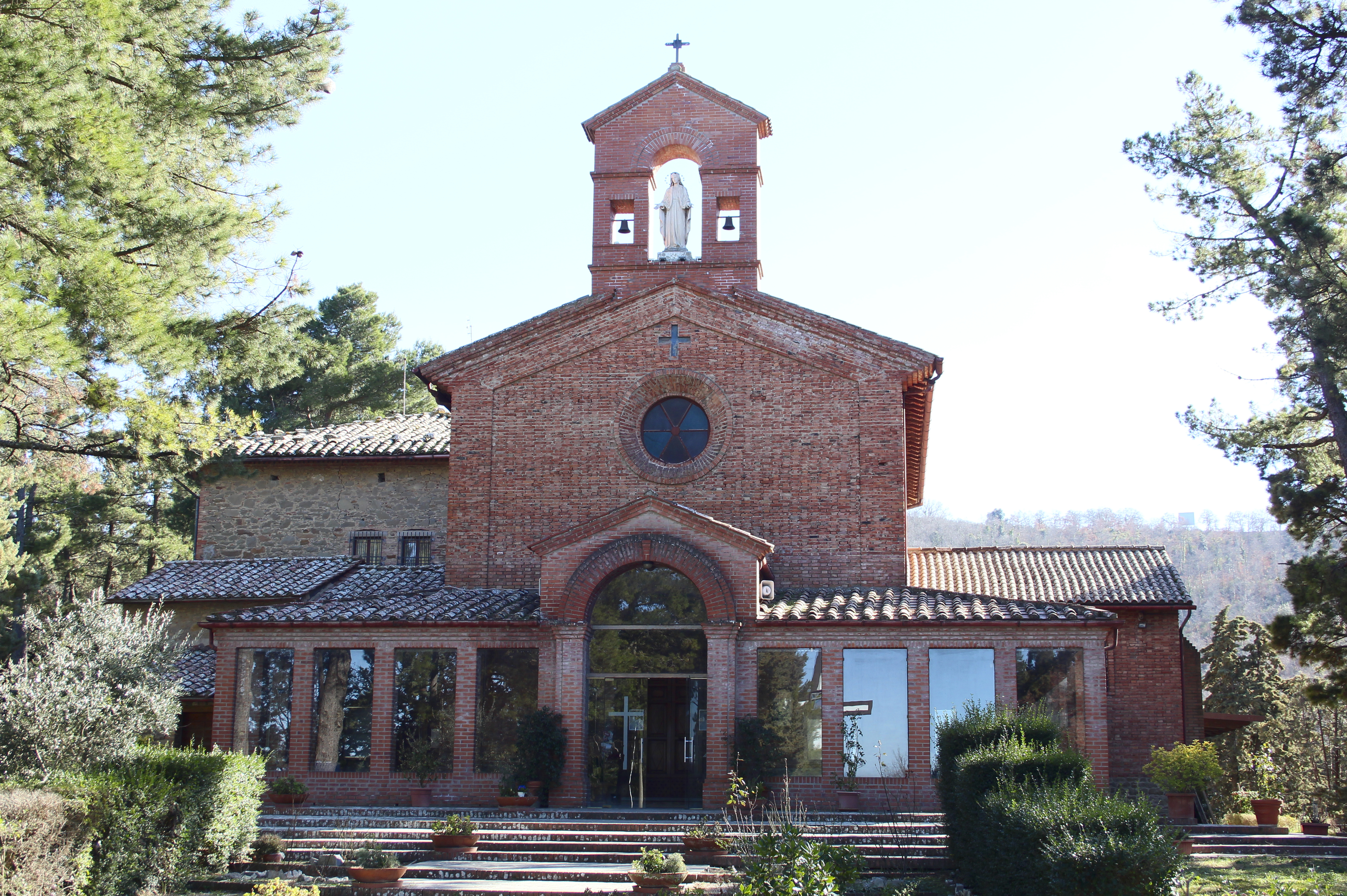
Madonna delle Grondici

The Sanctuary of the Madonna delle Grondici stands in the frazione of Tavernelle. It originated in the 15th century to protect an image of the Madonna painted on a roadside shrine, associated in local tradition with the resurrection of a child.

The name Grondici is linked to suggrunda, the part of a roof projecting from an exterior wall, in relation to the fact that unbaptized infants could not be buried in consecrated ground, leading to burials under the eaves (sub grunda) and, over time, to the sanctuary's epithet. The building was cared for by hermits until the beginning of the 20th century. Inside is the Virgin enthroned between Saints Sebastian and Roch by Gregorio Gregori, dated 1295, from Castel della Pieve.

=== Other religious buildings ===
The baroque church of the Madonna della Sbarra was built to house a sacred image of the Virgin Mary discovered in the 16th century in a tabernacle hidden among vegetation near the settlement.

The Church of San Salvatore in Ceraseto, built on the site of an ancient pagan temple, preserves an altarpiece of the Perugian school depicting Christ blessing, with Saints John the Baptist and Paul.

A Capuchin convent was founded in 1554 about 1 mile (1.6 km) to the south-east, and to the west, at a similar distance, stood the convent of Sant'Antonio delle Carceri near Paciano.

=== Palazzo del Podestà ===
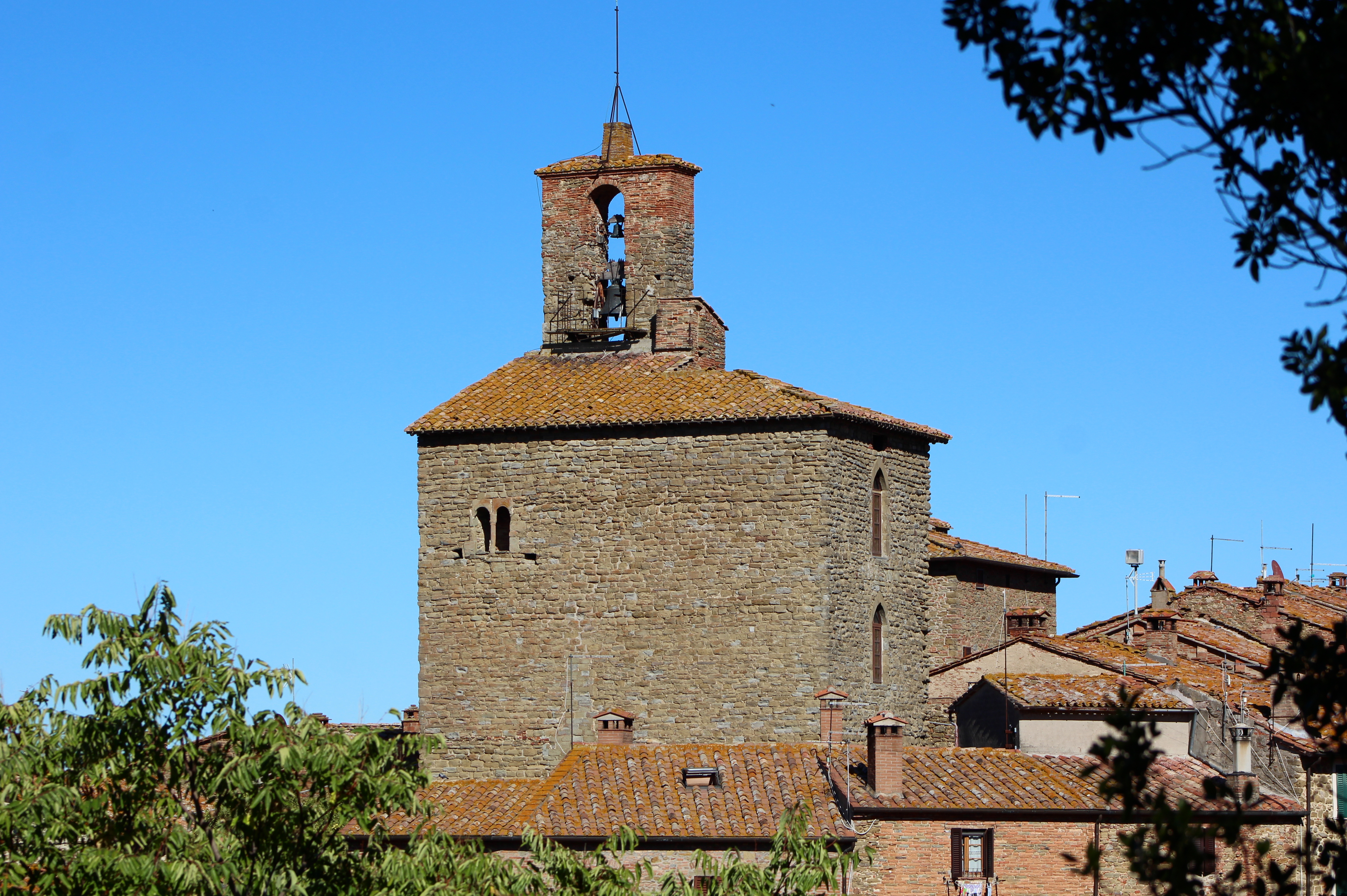
Palazzo del Podestà

The Palazzo del Podestà dates to between the 12th and 14th centuries and is attributed to the Maestri Comacini. The building is characterized in the text by its prominent bell tower, which can be seen from the surrounding valley.

=== Teatro Caporali ===
The municipal theatre, Teatro Cesare Caporali, originates from a local Società filodrammatica founded in 1694, which became the Accademia Teatrale in 1786. The academy commissioned a small wooden theatre by F. Tarducci, known as the Teatro del Sole.

In 1856 the theatre was enlarged and remodeled to a new design by the architect Giovanni Caproni, who expanded the stage, increased the number of boxes and added a gallery with a cast-iron railing. Decorative work was planned by the Perugian Alceste Ricci, and the main curtain was painted by Mariano Piervittori with a scene showing the condottiero Boldrino Paneri of Panicale receiving the keys of Perugia. The theatre reopened to the public in the carnival of 1858 under its current name.

=== Museo del Tulle ===
The Museo del Tulle is housed in the 16th-century church of Sant'Agostino, which was restored to conserve and display tulle embroidery works previously kept in private hands and in local churches.

The technique was practiced by the nuns of the Collegio delle Vergini in Panicale and taught to pupils until at least 1872, when the institution closed. From the 1930s Belleschi Grifoni founded a school and established the Ars Panicalensis mark. The work became well known, and examples are said to have been sold to the House of Savoy and to the Torlonia princes.

The church contains frescoes depicting Christ and the Virgin enthroned, Saint Lucy, Saint Catherine, Saint Anthony and Saint Clare, attributed to the school of Giotto. On the left wall above the altar is an Incoronation of the Virgin, attributed to Pietro Perugino.

=== Other secular buildings ===
The Pinacoteca Mariottini is located within the town hall. It holds 31 paintings consisting of celebratory portraits of men from the town.

== Notable people ==
Among the prominent families of Panicale in the 19th century were the Mancini, Cherubini, Orsini, Laudi, Zucchetti, Crescenzi, Rossini, Pepi, Mecucci, and Porcari, as well as the Montesperelli counts and the Marchesi Venuti and Misciattelli in the surrounding territory.

Panicale is linked by tradition to the Vannucci family, from which descended Pietro Vannucci, known as Perugino. Other distinguished natives include the 14th-century condottiero Boldrino Paneri, reputed instructor of Francesco Sforza; the poet Cesare Caporali; and the Jesuit Virgilio Cepari.

Other notable people include the painter Masolino da Panicale; the theologian Gregorio Sellari; and the composer Sante Maria Romitelli.
