= Tavernelle =

Tavarnelle may refer to places in Italy:

- Tavernelle, Licciana Nardi, a populated place in Licciana Nardi, Lunigiana
- Tavernelle (Veneto), a populated place in province of Vicenza, Veneto
- Tavernelle (Colli al Metauro), a populated place in Colli al Metauro, Marche
- Tavernelle, Panicale, a populated place in Panicale, Umbria
- Tavernelle or Colle del Sole, a populated place in Rome

== See also ==
- Tavarnelle (disambiguation)
