= Music of Umbria =

There are 70 community bands, 110 community choirs, and about 20 secondary music schools. The region is famous for its music festivals, including the Festival dei Due Mondi (Festival of Two Worlds) in Spoleto and the Umbria Jazz Festival.

== Musical venues and activities ==
The city of Perugia has the Oreste Trotta Phonoteque, a collection of autographed recordings donated by many of the musicians who have performed in Perugia over the last 50 years. Perugia also hosts the autumnal Sagra Musicale Umbra, an annual music festival. Auditoriums include the Sala dei Notari, the Teatro della Sapienza, the Oratorio di Santa Cecilia and the Teatro Moriacchi. The town of Città di Castello, in the province, is the site of the Francesco Morlacchi music conservatory. Spoleto, is the home of the Two Worlds Festival. Other towns in the province—Foligno, Gubbio, Marsciano, Narni, Norcia, Panicale, Spello—all have theaters as venues for music. The town of Todi also sponsors a new annual music festival, TodiMusicFest. The Umbria Jazz Festival takes place at various sites throughout the region.

Since 1999 in Foligno there is a small concert hall, called "Feedback" (now closed), which every year brought from 50 to 100 live music events (most of them with free admittance). Many important artists had a gig, such as Fennesz, Verdena, Explosions in the Sky, Liars, and most of the Italian artists of the alternative scene.

Terni's original Teatro Verdi was destroyed in World War II but was rebuilt and reopened in 1948. It is the main "music place" in the province of Terni and hosts its own provincial jazz festival as well as symphony concerts and opera. It is also the site for the annual Casagrande International Piano Competition. Also, a Roman amphitheater, in Terni, is the site of outdoor concerts.
