= Paciano =

- Comune
- Comune di Paciano
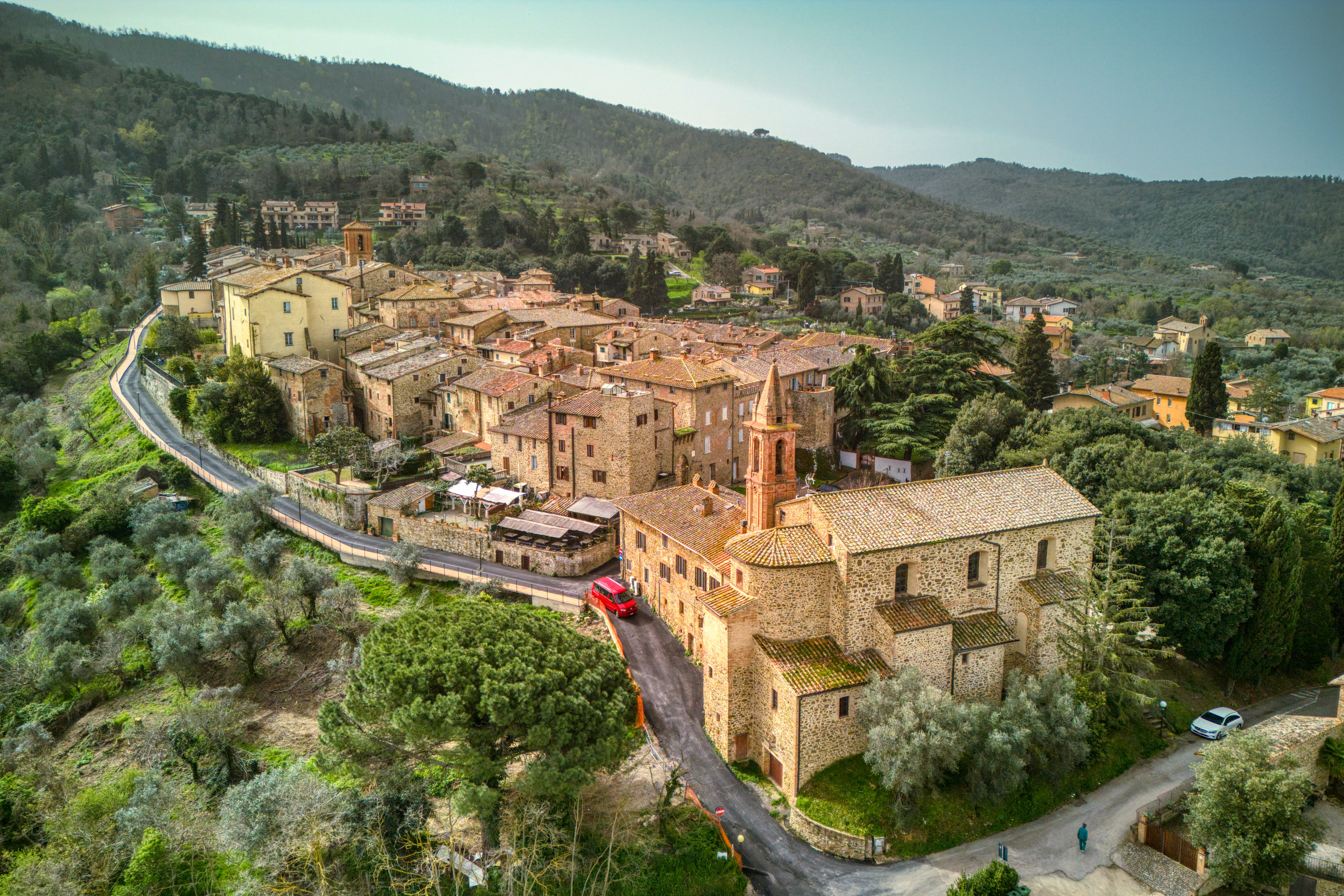
- Panorama of Paciano

- Location within Italy Location within Umbria
- Coordinates: 43.022343°N 12.070797°E
- Country: Italy
- Region: Umbria
- Province: Province of Perugia (PG)

Government
  - Mayor: Riccardo Bardelli

Area
  - Total: 16.8 km^{2} (6.5 sq mi)
- Elevation: 391 m (1,283 ft)

Population (1 January 2025)
  - Total: 937
  - Density: 55.8/km^{2} (144/sq mi)
- Demonym: Pacianesi
- Time zone: UTC+1 (CET)
  - Summer (DST): UTC+2 (CEST)
- Postal code: 06060
- Dialing code: 075
- Website: Official website

Paciano is a comune (municipality) in the Province of Perugia in the Italian region Umbria, located about 30 km southwest of Perugia.

Paciano borders the following municipalities: Castiglione del Lago, Città della Pieve, Panicale, Piegaro. It is one of I Borghi più belli d'Italia ("The most beautiful villages of Italy").

== Etymology ==
According to Adone Palmieri, the name Paciano is said to derive either from Pace di Giano ("peace of Janus") or from the Roman Paccia gens.

== History ==
Paciano is first mentioned in 917 in an imperial charter of Berengar I. In its early history it appears as an estate granted to Uguccione II of Bourbon.

By 1258 Villa Paçani is recorded as a settlement under Perugia, and in 1260 it is described as Castrum Pacani, a fortified site. In 1282 it is listed as a "new castle" (Castrum Novum) with 44 households.

In the early 14th century the original fortress was destroyed and rebuilt nearby. In 1313 the inhabitants were exempted from participating in a military campaign against Todi.

In 1371 Paciano was granted as a perpetual fief to William of Beaufort. It was taken in 1416 by Braccio da Montone, and in 1443–1444 it was occupied and harassed by Ciarpellone.

Between 1461 and 1473 the walls were restored and the main tower was constructed. In the late 15th century the area was affected by conflict between the Baglioni and Degli Oddi families, during which members of the Oddi took refuge there. In 1489 Paciano returned under the authority of Perugia and the Papal States.

In 1672 it was raised to the rank of county by Pope Clement X, a status later revoked under Pope Gregory XVI.

In 1798 Paciano came under the Roman Republic, during which a civic guard was established; in 1799 Papal rule was restored. Papal authority was again suspended during the Napoleonic period under French control.

In 1803, Paciano was a feudal domain of the Conte della Staffa. By 1818, ownership is recorded under Conte Francesco Connestabile della Staffa.

In 1816 Paciano became an autonomous municipality. In 1860 it was annexed to the Kingdom of Sardinia, and subsequently became part of the Kingdom of Italy.

In the mid-19th century Paciano had a population of 1,018 inhabitants. Of these, 255 resided within the town and 826 in the countryside.

== Geography ==
Paciano stands on a hill at about 400 metres (1,300 ft) above sea level and lies 14 kilometres (8.7 mi) from Città della Pieve, 2 miles (3.2 km) from Panicale, about 3 miles (4.8 km) from Lake Trasimeno, and 1 mile (1.6 km) from the Tresa stream. The climate is described as temperate, with prevailing southern winds.

The settlement consists of the main village, still enclosed by ancient walls restored in the 15th century, and an external borgo.

=== Subdivisions ===
The municipality includes the localities of Borgarucci, Caselle, Le Case, Mazzarelli, Paciano, Peschiera, Poderaccio Basso.

In 2021, 202 people lived in rural dispersed dwellings not assigned to any named locality. At the time, the most populous locality was Paciano proper (523).

==== Paciano vecchio ====
The present settlement is sometimes referred to as Paciano nuovo, to distinguish it from Paciano vecchio. The earlier settlement of Paciano Vecchio survives only in part, notably in the form of a crenellated tower called the Torre d'Orlando, situated on a height about 1 mile (1.6 km) from the present town.

The designation nuovo for Paciano does not appear before the 14th century.

== Economy ==
In the 19th century the inhabitants were chiefly engaged in agriculture. The land produced cereals, oil, wine, chestnuts, and acorns.

== Religion and culture ==
=== Santa Maria Assunta ===
The principal church is Santa Maria Assunta, the parish church, described as very ancient and located outside Porta Chiusina, and holding the title of prepositure.

=== San Giuseppe ===
The church of San Giuseppe preserve a painted processional banner on canvas, executed in tempera and attributed to Bonfigli. It depicts Christ above, with the archangels Raphael and Gabriel, and the Virgin sheltering the faithful, flanked by saints including Sebastian and Nicholas of Tolentino; a view of Paciano appears at the center. The church also houses two 15th-century tempera panels on gold ground representing Saint Peter and Saint Mustiola, as well as a large fresco of the Crucifixion bearing an inscription dated 1548 and signed by Francisco de Castro Plebis.

=== Sant'Antonio da Padova ===
The church of Sant'Antonio da Padova, dating to the 15th century and located near the town, preserves in its sacristy a large double-sided tempera panel. One side shows scenes of Christ's life including the Crucifixion and Deposition, while the other depicts the Virgin enthroned with the Child, accompanied by saints including Michael, Francis, Clare, and Peter.

=== Other religious buildings ===
Other churches include Santa Maria della Stella and a church dedicated to the Blessed Virgin and Saint Joseph, situated near the communal palace and adjoining the clock tower.

The church of the Compagnia della Morte contains, on the high altar, an oil painting depicting the Crucifixion with the Virgin, Saint John, Saint Francis, and Saint Charles Borromeo, attributed to the Bolognese school.

In the surrounding area are additional ecclesiastical jurisdictions, including San Michele Arcangelo, partly belonging to another parish of Panicale; San Donato, partly dependent on Città della Pieve; and San Salvatore di Ceraseto, also partly under Panicale.

The church of Ceraseto, located about 1 mile (1.6 km) north of Panicale and 1 mile (1.6 km) east of Paciano, is described as very ancient and is traditionally said to have been a pagan temple later converted into a church, where Saint Mustiola took refuge in 270.

A convent of Sant'Antonio degli Osservanti stands nearby and contained a painting by Luca Signorelli.

=== Palazzo Baldeschi ===
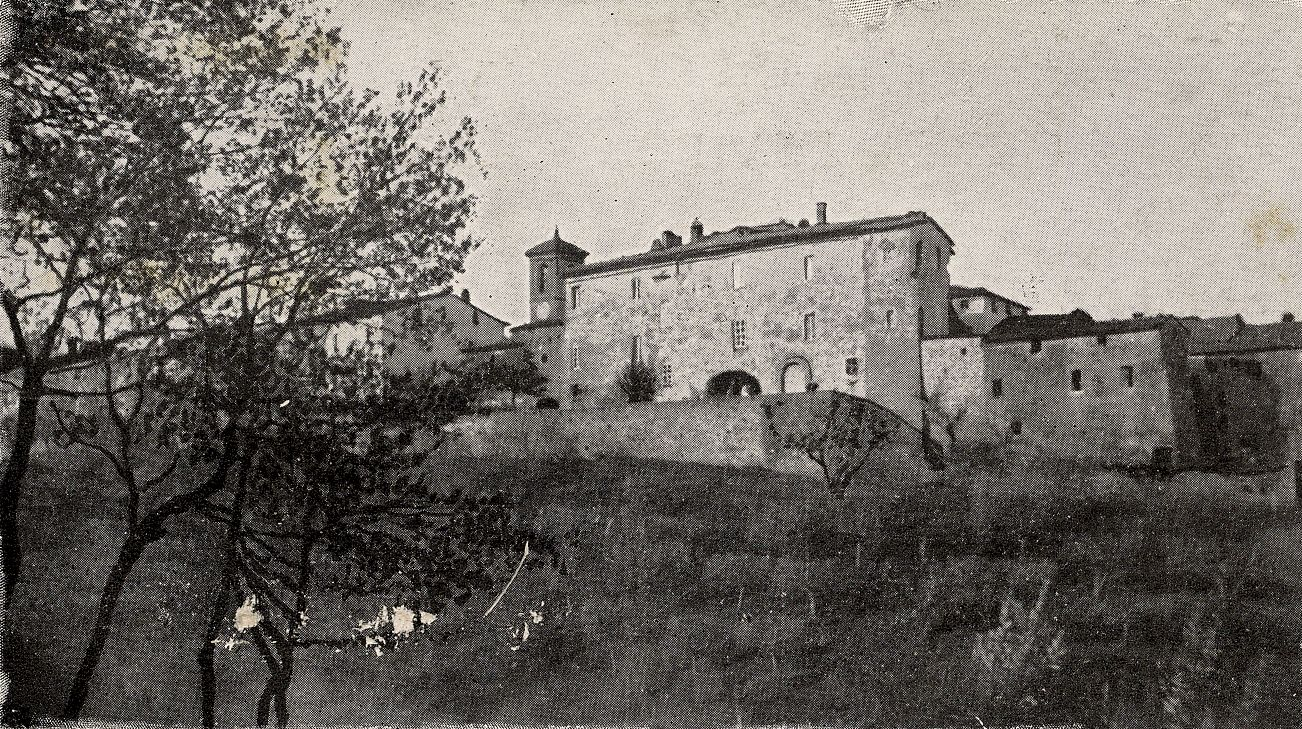
Palazzo Baldeschi in 1905

Palazzo Baldeschi was built in the 17th century through the integration of several tower houses. The structure is characterized by a simple and compact appearance, with predominant use of brick and sandstone. The main portal is surmounted by a travertine coat of arms, while the interior features a large staircase attributed to Jacopo Barozzi da Vignola.

The building houses TrasiMemo, a museum documenting traditional knowledge related to artisanal, agricultural and food production activities of the Lake Trasimene area.

=== Other cultural sites ===
Among the most prominent secular buildings is a palace formerly belonging to the Vitelli family and later to the Cennini.

An academy known as the Filopedici was established locally by a Monsignor Severa.

== Notable people ==
Among notable individuals from Paciano are Ser Cristofaro, a diplomat associated with the Baglioni family; Tarquinio Bonci, a theologian in Perugia; Giacinto Grazi, a librarian in the same city; and Jesuit figures including Francesco Secchini in the 16th century and Giulio Polidori.

Other notable families associated with the town include the della Staffa, Danzetta, and Baldeschi.
