= Martyrdom of Saint Sebastian (Perugino) =

Fresco by Pietro Perugino

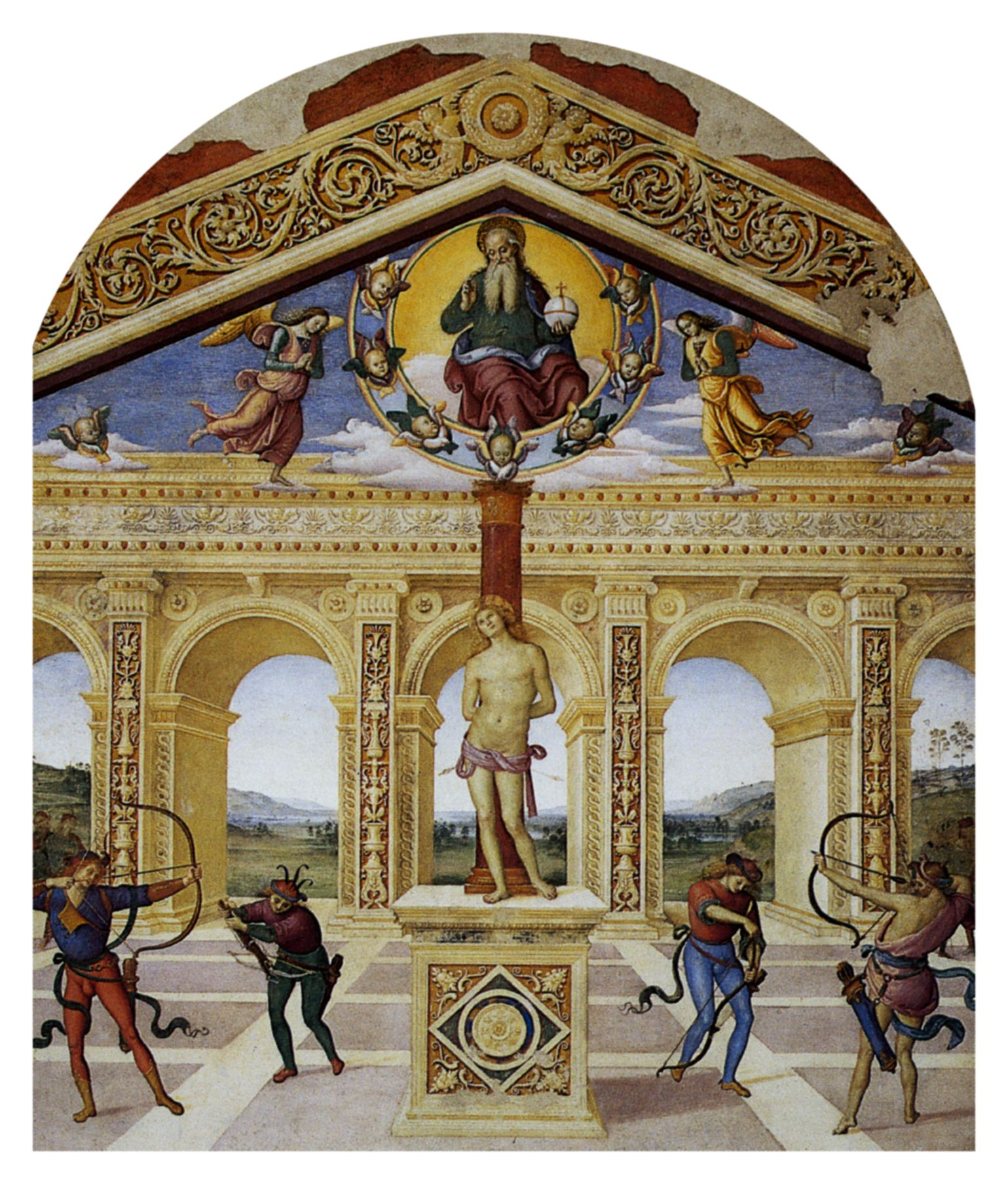
The Martyrdom of St Sebastian (1505) by Perugino

The Martyrdom of St Sebastian is a 1505 fresco painting by Perugino in the church of San Sebastiano in Panicale. It shows the martyrdom of St Sebastian in an ancient Roman setting, with God the Father in a tondo above.

== Theme ==
The subject depicted, according to Christian iconography, is the martyrdom of Saint Sebastian, a Roman saint who was supposedly killed during the persecutions of Diocletian in the early 4th century. He is often represented in art, tied to a post, his body pierced with arrows. This theme was frequently explored by Perugino and his circle, as well as by numerous other painters.

== Description ==
The martyrdom of Saint Sebastian, a Roman soldier condemned to be shot with arrows because of his Christian faith, takes place in a sort of porticoed square, with a series of solemn ancient arches in the background and a floor of squares in perspective. At the center of the square is a large plinth where Sebastian is tied to a column, while all around, in balanced symmetrical positions, four executioners are shooting him with arrows. Above, beneath a sort of tympanum decorated with painted bas-reliefs, stands the Eternal Father surrounded by two angels, cherubim, and seraphim within a luminous halo, blessing the saint who gazes upon him.

== Analysis ==
Numerous elements are drawn from classical architecture, albeit imaginatively reinterpreted. In the distance, beyond the arches, a gentle landscape stretches out, fading as far as the eye can see according to the laws of aerial perspective. Saint Sebastian is depicted in a now conventional manner, with his semi-nude body elegantly balanced in a "contrapposto" pose, inspired by ancient statuary. The movement of the archers, with the two angels seemingly rushing toward them, is the only hint of movement in the scene, which is otherwise dominated by a sense of calm tranquility, striving for an ideally perfect form.
