= Tavarnelle =

Tavarnelle may refer to places in Italy:

- Barberino Tavarnelle, a commune
  - Tavarnelle Val di Pesa, a part of Barberino Tavarnelle
- A.S.D. San Donato Tavarnelle, an Italian association football club

== See also ==
- Tavernelle (disambiguation)
