= Romeo Gallenga-Stuart =

Italian politician (1879–1938)

Romeo Gallenga Stuart
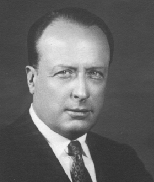
- Romeo Gallenga Stuart

Senator of the Kingdom of Italy
- In office 2 March 1929 – 11 January 1938

Member of the Chamber of Deputies of the Kingdom of Italy
- In office 1909–1921

Personal details
- Born: February 27, 1879 Rome, Kingdom of Italy
- Died: January 11, 1938 (aged 58) Rome, Kingdom of Italy
- Party: Italian Nationalist Association; National Fascist Party
- Education: Sapienza University of Rome
- Occupation: Politician, sports official, journalist

Romeo Gallenga Stuart (27 February 1879 – 11 January 1938) was an Italian politician, sports executive, and journalist who served as a Deputy, Senator, and Undersecretary for Foreign Propaganda during World War I.

== Biography ==
Gallenga Stuart was born in Rome, the son of Romeo Gallenga Sr. and Mary Montgomery Stuart, who was descended from the House of Stuart. He graduated in literature and philosophy from the Sapienza University of Rome.

Active in early 20th-century Italian sports administration, he served as President of the Italian Pedestrian Union and the Italian Sports Athletics Federation (predecessors of FIDAL) between 1906 and 1912. In 1910, he organized the first Italian university sports championships in Perugia and became the first president of A.C. Perugia Calcio. In November 1910, he co-founded the first Scout group in Umbria.

Elected to the Chamber of Deputies for Perugia in 1909, he co-founded the parliamentary group of the Italian Nationalist Association in 1913. During World War I, he served as a cavalry officer. In November 1917, Prime Minister Vittorio Emanuele Orlando appointed him Undersecretary of State for Foreign Propaganda and Press to manage foreign public diplomacy.

In 1922, Gallenga Stuart co-founded the Automobile Club of Rome, serving as its president until 1931. Appointed a Senator of the Kingdom on 2 March 1929, he served as Secretary of the Senate from 1934 until his death in 1938.

In 1926, he donated his family's palace, Palazzo Gallenga Stuart in Perugia, to the municipality. The building later became the headquarters of the University for Foreigners Perugia.

== Honours ==
- (Kingdom of Italy) Grand Officer of the Order of the Crown of Italy (1925)
- (Kingdom of Italy) Grand Officer of the Order of Saints Maurice and Lazarus (1934)
