= Tavernelle, Panicale =

Tavernelle
- Frazione
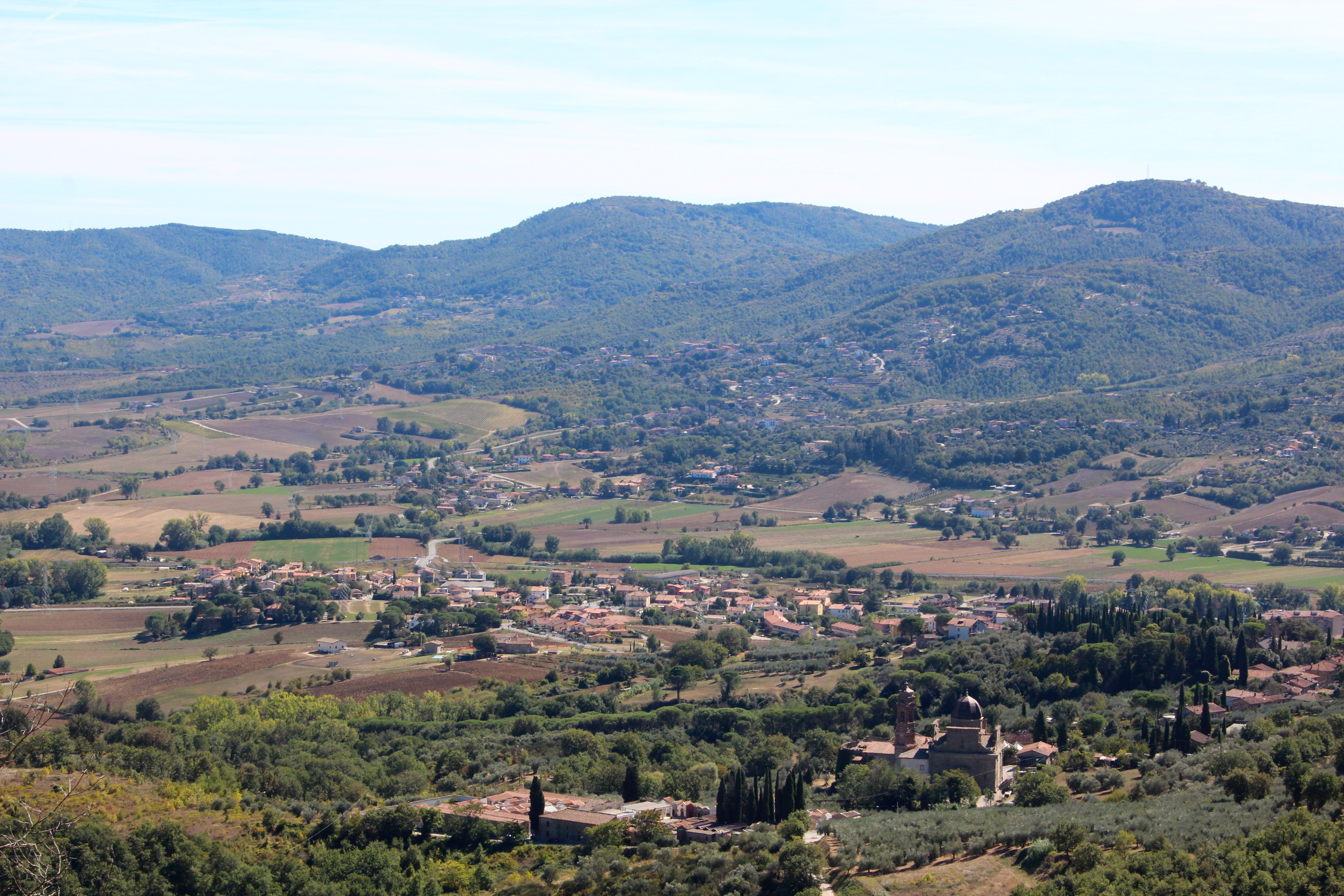
- View of Tavernelle

- Location of Tavernelle in Italy
- Coordinates: 43°0′N 12°8′E
- Country: Italy
- Region: Umbria
- Province: Perugia (PG)
- Comune: Panicale
- Elevation: 236 m (774 ft)

Population (2021)
  - Total: 2,931
- Time zone: UTC+1 (CET)
  - Summer (DST): UTC+2 (CEST)

Tavernelle is a frazione of Panicale, in the province of Perugia. With more than 2,800 inhabitants, it is the most populated place in the comune and main economic centre.

== History ==
In 1354 the army of Fra Moriale established its quarters at Tavernelle. In 1361 the locality belonged to the count of the Mecche family, whose residence was burned by the inhabitants.

In 1395 it was enlarged with the approval of the council of Perugia.

In 1490 a hospital for the poor was founded by Amico di Meo, Salvator di Meo, parish priest, and Gregorio di Bartolo di Vanera. In 1582 this institution was reduced to a chapel by Pope Gregory XIII.

On 28 September 1841 Pope Gregory XVI, travelling from Perugia toward Piegaro along the provincial road, stopped at Tavernelle.

== Main sights ==
- Castello di Mongiovino
- Palazzo dell'Orologio
- Chiesa di San Rocco
- Chiesa di San Luigi Gonzaga
- Santuario della Madonna di Mongiovino, built from 1524 to 1728.
- Santuario della Madonna delle Grondici, XV century
- Fontana del Leone
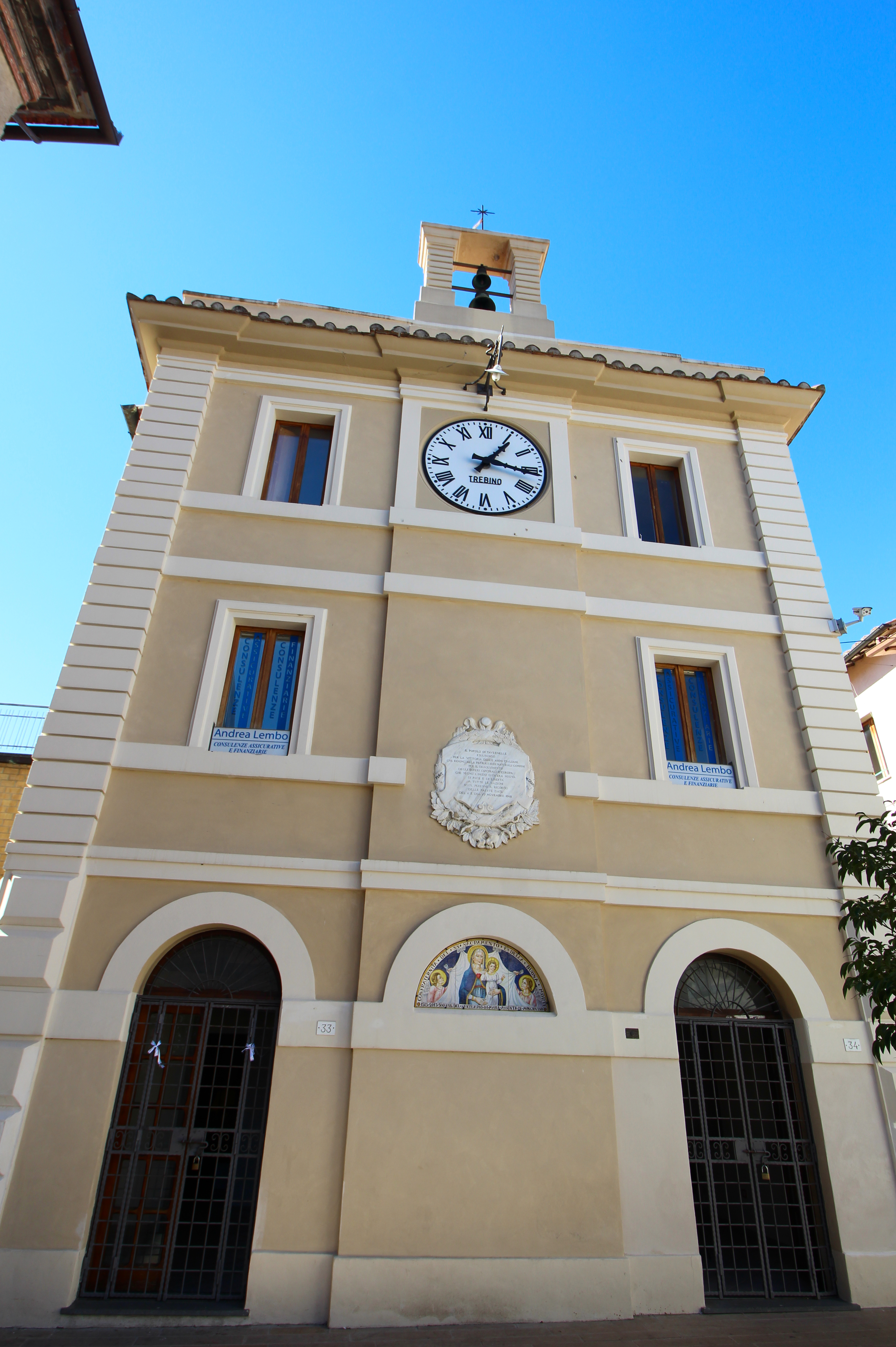
Palazzo dell'Orologio

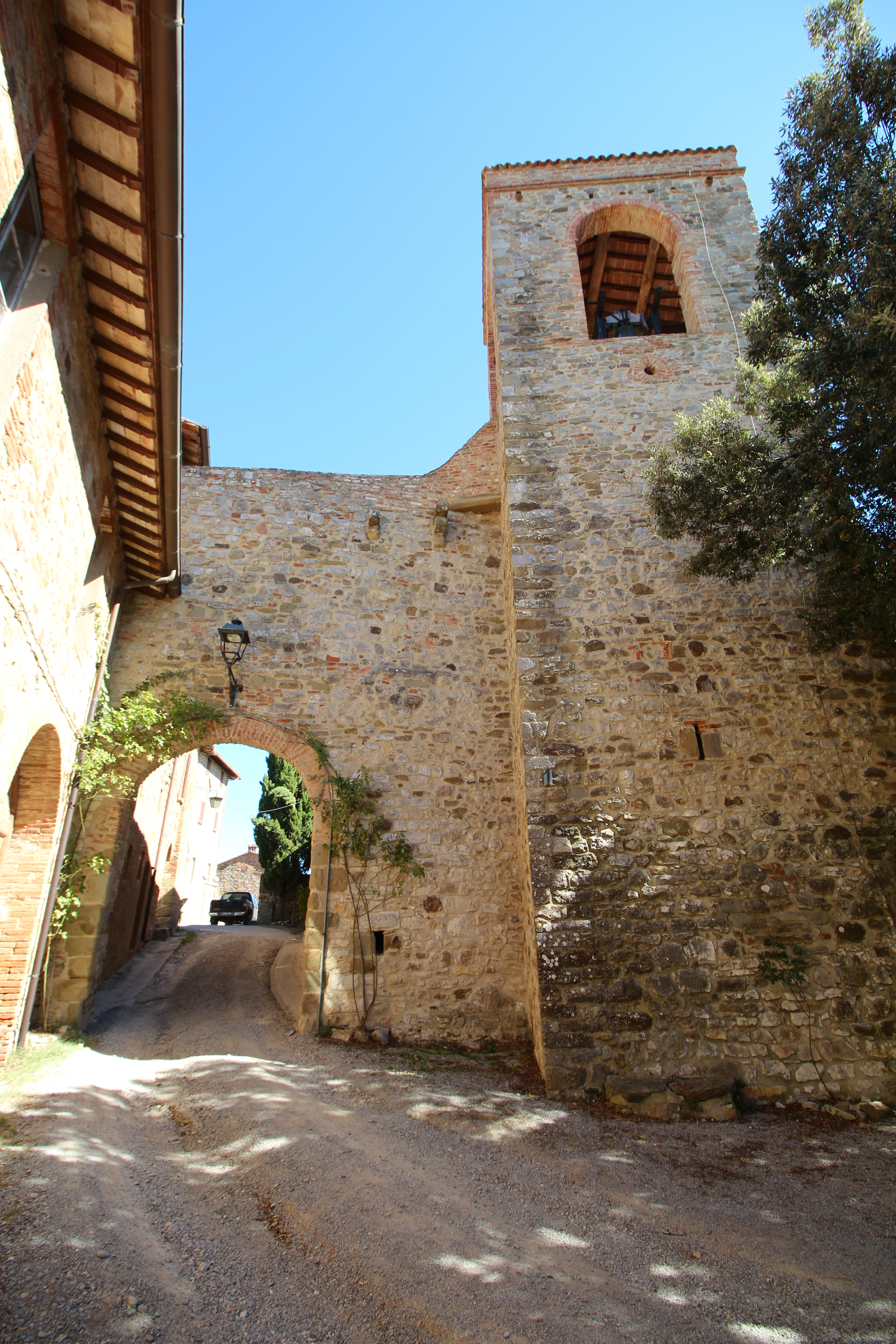
Castle
