= Cesare Caporali =

Italian Renaissance writer

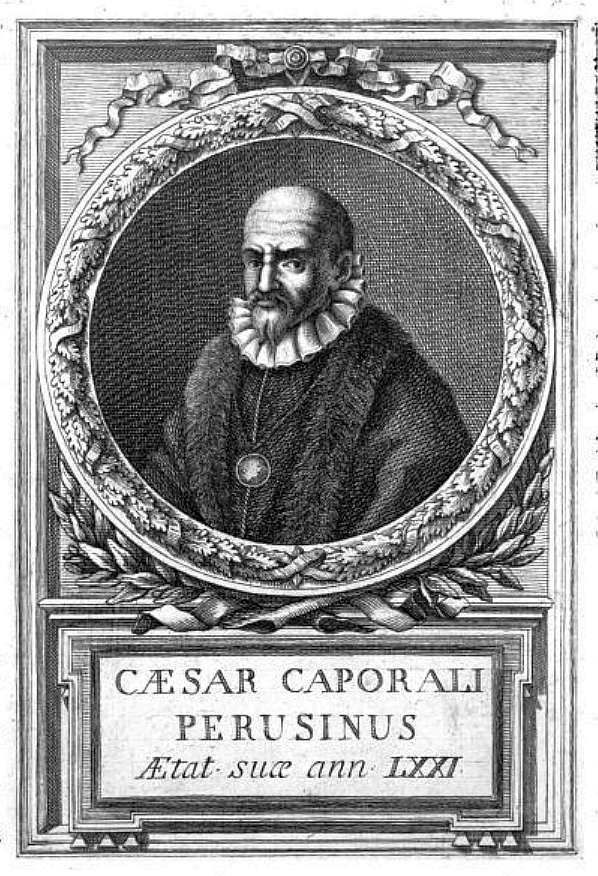
- Cesare Caporali
- Born: 20 June 1531; Perugia, Papal States
- Died: December 1601 (aged 70); Castiglione del Lago, Papal States
- Occupations: Poet; Intellectual; Civil servant
- Father: Camillo Caporali
- Writing career
- Language: Italian
- Notable works: Viaggio in Parnaso; Avvisi di Parnaso
- Movements: Renaissance; Petrarchism

Cesare Caporali (Italian: [ˈtʃeːzare ka.poˈra.li]; 20 June 1531 – December 1601) was an Italian Renaissance poet.

== Biography ==
Caporali was born in Perugia on 20 June 1531. He lived some years at Rome in the service of cardinal Fulvio Giulio della Corgna. In Rome he attended literary clubs, striking up a friendship with Annibale Caro and Jacopo Sadoleto, as well as the large group of Umbrian scholars, including Trifone Benci, to whom he dedicated his famous capitolo della corte, composed after his break with Della Corgna and at the time when he entered service of his new patron Ferdinando de' Medici. Caporali followed Ferdinando de' Medici in Florence and was afterwards in the service of cardinal Ottavio Acquaviva in Naples. He was a member of the Accademia degli Insensati and governor of Atri and Giulianova, two small towns in Abruzzo. Caporali died in 1601 in Castiglione del Lago, in the house of Ascanio Della Cornia, one of his patrons.

== Works ==
In his youth Caporali was passionately fond of reading and translating Horace. His early works imitated the style of Francesco Berni. Caporali published two satirical poems in Berni’s style, Viaggio in Parnaso (Voyage to Parnassus) and Avvisi di Parnaso (News from Parnassus). The poems, written in approximately 1580, were published for the first time in Parma in 1582, in the volume entitled Rime piacevoli. The two works were hugely influential and inspired Miguel de Cervantes's Viaje al Parnaso, Trajano Boccalini's Ragguagli di Parnaso and Carlo de' Dottori's Il Parnaso. Among his other works the most notable are the poems Vita di Mecenate and Esequie di Mecenate, poetic versions of the history of Rome centred on Gaius Maecenas, the model patron of literature.

== Bibliography ==
- Cavallucci, Vincenzio (1770). "Vita di Cesare Caporali". Rime di Cesare Caporali Perugino Diligentemente Corrette, Colle Osservazioni di Carlo Caporali. Perugia: nella Stamperia Augusta di Mario Riginaldi: 1–35.
- Gallenga Stuart, Romeo A. (1903). Cesare Caporali. Perugia: Donini.
- Croce, Benedetto (1911). "Due illustrazioni al "Viaje de Pernaso" del Cervantes. Il Caporali, il Cervantes e Giulio Cesare Cortese". Saggi di Letteratura Italiana del Seicento. Bari: Laterza: 123–135.
- Firpo, Luigi (1946). "Allegoria e satira in Parnaso". Belfagor. I (6): 673–699.
- Mutini, Claudio (1975). "CAPORALI, Cesare". Dizionario Biografico degli Italiani (in Italian). Vol. 18: Canella–Cappello. Rome: Istituto dell'Enciclopedia Italiana. ISBN 978-88-12-00032-6.
- Cacciaglia, Norberto (1993). "Il viaggio di Parnaso" di Cesare Caporali. Perugia: Guerra Edizioni.
- Davie, M. (2002). "Caporali, Cesare". The Oxford Companion to Italian Literature. Oxford University Press. ISBN 978-0-19-818332-7.
- Ciri, Filippo (2007). "Verso il Seicento: Cesare Caporali". Autorità, modelli e antimodelli nella cultura artistica e letteraria tra Riforma e Controriforma. Atti del Seminario internazionale di studi Urbino-Sassocorvaro, 9-11 novembre 2006. Manziana: Vecchiarelli Editore: 213–224. ISBN 9788882472092.
