= Adone Palmieri =

Italian physician and scholar

Adone Palmieri (fl. 1831–1863) was an Italian physician, surgeon, and scholar from Bevagna, Umbria.

== Biography ==
Palmieri graduated in philosophy, medicine, and surgery, later becoming professor of anatomy, physiology, and obstetrics. From 1831 he served as health officer of the Pontifical militias. He received several honors, including a gold medal from the Papal government for his publications, a silver medal for his work on vaccination, and medals for his free medical care to the poor in Rome. He was a prolific writer on medicine, natural sciences, and local history.

Palmieri served with the Papal forces as a medical officer during the First Italian War of Independence of 1848. He authored a contemporary account of the Second Battle of Vicenza, published in 1848 under the title Alcune parole sulla battaglia di Vicenza o disinganno per molti, in which he described the course of the fighting and the eventual capitulation.

Palmieri was a member of numerous academies in Italy and abroad, including the Accademia dei Lincei, the Accademia dei Georgofili, and the Société des sciences physiques, chimiques et arts agricoles of Paris. His career also included contributions to major medical and technological dictionaries published in Venice, and collaborations with scientific journals in Bologna, Verona, and Rome.

== Works ==
- Dizionario portatile sui mezzi più efficaci e meno dispendiosi utili a fugare i principali insetti (1836)
- Vita di San Cesario Medico (1850)
- La rosa di Gerico, o Maria della salute. Libro d’istruzione popolare (1855)
- Topografia Statistica dello Stato Pontificio (1857)
- Piccolo manuale di medicina popolare (1863)
