= Chiaravalle (family) =

The Chiaravalle were an Italian noble family prominent in Umbria during the Middle Ages and Renaissance. Originating in the region around Todi, they became lords of the castles of Canale and Lacuscello.

Known as fierce Ghibelline partisans, the family engaged in prolonged feuds with the rival Atti of Todi, the city of Amelia, and the Papal States. Their history is marked by acts of violence, raids, assassinations, and repeated exiles, interspersed with periods of dominance through military prowess and strategic alliances.

By the late 15th century, their power waned following decisive papal and communal interventions. Later branches integrated peacefully into the aristocracy of Amelia and Terni, producing notable military leaders and religious figures.

== Origins ==
The precise origins of the Chiaravalle remain obscure. 17th-century chroniclers attempted to trace them to ancient or foreign roots, but contemporary documents provide no confirmation. The family first appears in records in the 13th century as a potent force holding fortified castles on the unstable borders between Amelia and Todi.

By 1208, members such as Offreduccio di Canale, Federico di Lacuscello, and Messer Chiaravalle are documented as consuls of Todi and witnesses to acts of submission by Amelia. At this stage they were not yet fully in possession of Canale, which passed to them later through cessions by the Annibaldi of Rome in the mid-14th century.

== Rise amid Guelph–Ghibelline conflicts ==
The Chiaravalle aligned decisively with the Ghibelline faction, opposing Papal authority and the Guelf party led by the Atti. During the turbulent reign of Frederick II, they exploited regional instability to expand influence through piracy, sackings, and seizures of territory. In 1250 they began open conflict with the Atti. By 1257, street fighting and castle raids in Todi and surrounding areas escalated, and Pope Alexander IV threatened excommunication and intervention.

After defeats, the family withdrew to their strongholds but regrouped to Acquasparta. In 1267 they were readmitted to Todi through Ghibelline podestà Savelli.

Repeated skirmishes over the castle of Canale prompted Papal bulls from Pope Nicholas IV in 1291, urging the Bishop of Amelia to end the war between the citizens of Canale — specifically involving Massaruzio di Roberto di Offeduccio di Canale and Montagina, daughter of the captain of the castle — and authorizing the two relatives to contract marriage despite their kinship.

In 1272, the Chiaravalle burned the village of Collevalenza, reportedly killing even the children there, and were subsequently banished from Todi, stripped of offices, and declared enemies of the homeland.

== 14th century ==
Despite bans, the family repeatedly returned when political winds shifted. In 1297, Pope Boniface VIII, who had long lived in Todi and favored the Chiaravalle, appointed a Chiaravalle, Enrico, to be Bishop of Zara. His relatives purchased the abandoned castle of Montemarte together with Montemileto and Monteguidano, greatly expanding their possessions around Todi.

Their repeated raids in the territory of Amelia prompted the city to construct the fortress of Colcello (Colcellum) specifically to counter the Chiaravalle stronghold at Canale. During this period the family continued their alliances with the Narni while engaging in conflicts with Amelia and Spoleto.

In 1307 they were defeated by the Trinci, who allied with the Atti and the Guelphs of Todi.

They persistently sought to regain power in Todi. In 1322, attempting to end their exile in the countryside, they tried to seize Todi through a stratagem but were repelled. In 1324, they retaliated by burning Casigliano, though they failed to advance on Todi itself.

The arrival of Louis the Bavarian in 1324 briefly revived Ghibelline hopes. The Chiaravalle occupied San Gemini, and burned the bishop's palace in Todi. However, the condottiero Giannotto d'Alviano subsequently re-established control.

Under Cardinal Albornoz (1350s–1360s), their power was curtailed: Canale was razed and later rebuilt under Papal control. In 1377 they sold the fortress of Canale to the Anguillara; by 1380 they briefly handed Todi to the Duke of Bavaria (nephew of Bernabò Visconti). In 1395 they surrendered all internal and external fortresses to Biordo Michelotti.

== Renewed wars with Amelia ==
At the beginning of the 15th century the Chiaravalle resumed hostilities against Amelia. Incendiary raids and robberies became daily occurrences. In response, Amelia reinforced Colcello with new walls and towers (still visible today). By 1400 it had grown into a formidable double-walled fortress with robust bastions, underground stores, and a central keep designed for prolonged sieges. Todi remained neutral initially, but King Louis of Anjou and condottieri such as Tartaglia di Lavello enforced temporary truces (1414).

Braccio da Montone temporarily reinstated the family in Todi (1416) but later stripped them of Canale, granting it to Piccinino in 1423.

In 1449, facing encirclement, the Chiaravalle submitted the castle of Canale and other territories to Terni, paying an annual tribute for protection, yet they renewed attacks on Amelia the following year. Papal captains Braccio Baglioni and Giacomo Fortebraccio were dispatched in 1453 to pacify the region.

== Destruction of Canale ==
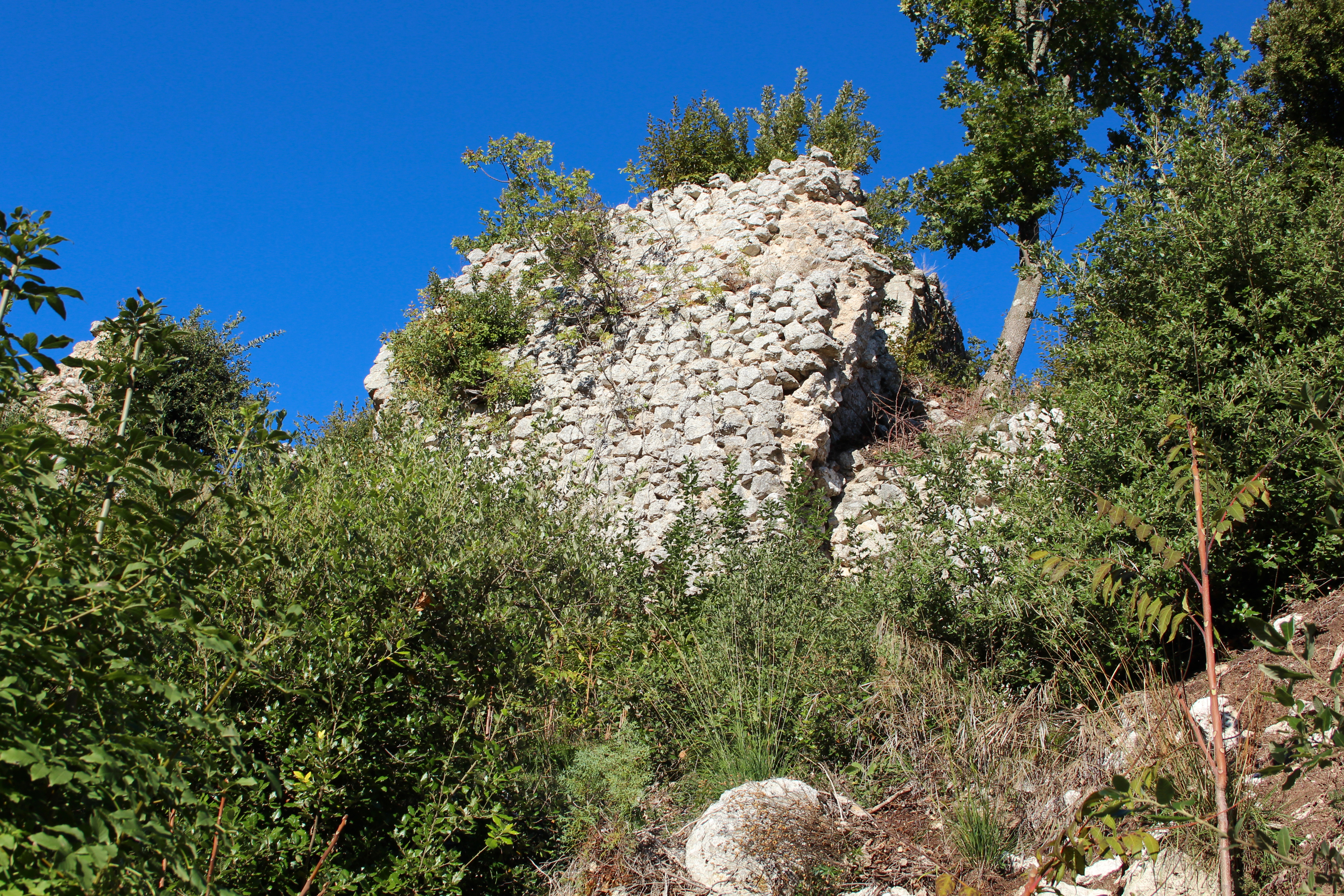
Ruins of the castle of Canale

Tensions peaked in the 1450s–1460s. Despite oaths of peace, the Chiaravalle resumed raids. In 1459 the Council of Todi exiled them again. Forces of Amelia, aided by Bishop Cretense (Vice-Chamberlain), inflicted a devastating defeat at Colcello in 1460–1461, massacring most of the Chiaravalle present.

Pope Pius II responded with a 1462 bull ordering the complete destruction of Canale. After negotiations led by representatives from Todi and Amelia, the castles were reassigned: Canale to Todi and Lacuscello to Amelia, with the explicit prohibition that neither could ever be rebuilt. The Chiaravalle received compensatory estates in the Diocese of Sora (Casa Olivieri and Castello) plus properties in Civita Castellana. A few retained minor holdings such as Castel dell'Aquila and Torre di Lamberto.

== Final rebellions ==
Violence persisted. Under Pope Sixtus IV, Giuliano della Rovere (future Julius II) restored peace in 1479, but the Chiaravalle continued operations. In 1480 the family assassinated the elderly Andrea Atti by throwing him from a palace window in Todi. They fortified Collevalenza and Rosceto for further raids. Alviano forces drove them back to Acquasparta in 1481. Assassinations in Rome targeting Atti relatives prompted Todi to issue severe bans (cutting tongues or hanging for naming either faction).

The most notorious figure was Altobello Chiaravalle, a daring condottiero who achieved fame in sieges at Montecchio and the fortress of Todi. In 1492 they massacred 20 Atti supporters. Allied with Colonna and Orsini forces, they clashed with Giovanni Paolo Baglioni and Bartolomeo d'Alviano.

In 1499 Amelia hired Altobello to defeat Orte mercenaries raiding Porchiano. He won a complete victory near Attigliano, taking 61 prisoners. Yet his growing arrogance led to his downfall. A coalition including Orsini, Vitelli, Baglioni, Alviano, and Papal troops besieged him at Acquasparta. After bombardment breached the walls, the castle was sacked and burned. Altobello was captured, publicly mutilated, quartered, and his remains fed to dogs—an act recorded with horror by contemporary chroniclers.

== Decline and later branches ==
The dramatic execution of Altobello in 1499 effectively ended the family's military dominance. Surviving members dispersed to Amelia, Terni, and Orvieto. Agostino Chiaravalle, an Augustinian hermit in Montefalco, wrote in 1515 of the "bellicose Chiaravalle" entering their declinatio.

Some branches settled permanently in Amelia, intermarrying with local houses (Geraldini, Nacci, Ceracchini, Cansacchi, Artenisi, Venturelli) and even making restitution for wartime seizures. They held the gentile chapel with tombs in the Amelia Cathedral from 1471 and the priory of S. Giovanni di Canale.

A Terni branch produced governors, condottieri, and cardinals (Saverio, Cavalier of Malta, 1695). Other descendants became counts (Verolengo, 1664) and marquesses (Altavilla, 1635). By the 18th century the aggressive lineage had transformed into respected local notables.

== Bibliography ==
- Paradisi, Agostino Ateneo dell'uomo nobile opera legale, storica, morale, politica, e Kavalleresca, Venezia, 1725.
- Paradisi, Agostino Raccolta di notizie storiche, legali, e morali per formar il vero carattere della nobiltà, Ferrara, 1740.
- Pennazzi, Paolo Sambucetole. Cronache di un Castello sulla Via Amerina tra Amelia e Todi. Edizioni dell'Anthurium. 2013, Collana “La Storia e le Tradizioni” 8, pp. 304, cm. 17 x 24, ill. (CD allegato) ISBN 978-88-89552-36-0
- Simonetti, Aurelia Capitolato per l'Inclusione in Sanfocetole di 34 famiglie de Schiavi in Memoria Storica, n. 11 giugno 1997, Thyrus, Terni.
- Alvi, Giovan Battista (1765), Dizionario topografico tudertino, manoscritto, Archivio Storico Comunale, Todi.
- Alvi, Giovan Battista, Genealogie di famiglie tuderti, Archivio Storico Comunale, Todi.
- Cansacchi, Carlo, I Chiaravallesi nobili di Todi, Signori di Canale e Laguscello, Rivista Araldica 1935.
- Corradi, Marco (2005), Castrum Farnectae: le famiglie, la storia, le cronache di un castello umbro, Del Gallo, Spoleto.
- Cerquaglia, Zefferino (1999), Il comune di Montecastrilli: da Napoleone all'Unità d'Italia, Ediart, Todi.
- Cerquaglia, Zefferino (2002), Il Comune di Montecastrilli dall'Unità d'Italia alla Prima Guerra Mondiale, Ediart, Todi.
