= Jürgen Petersohn =

German historian

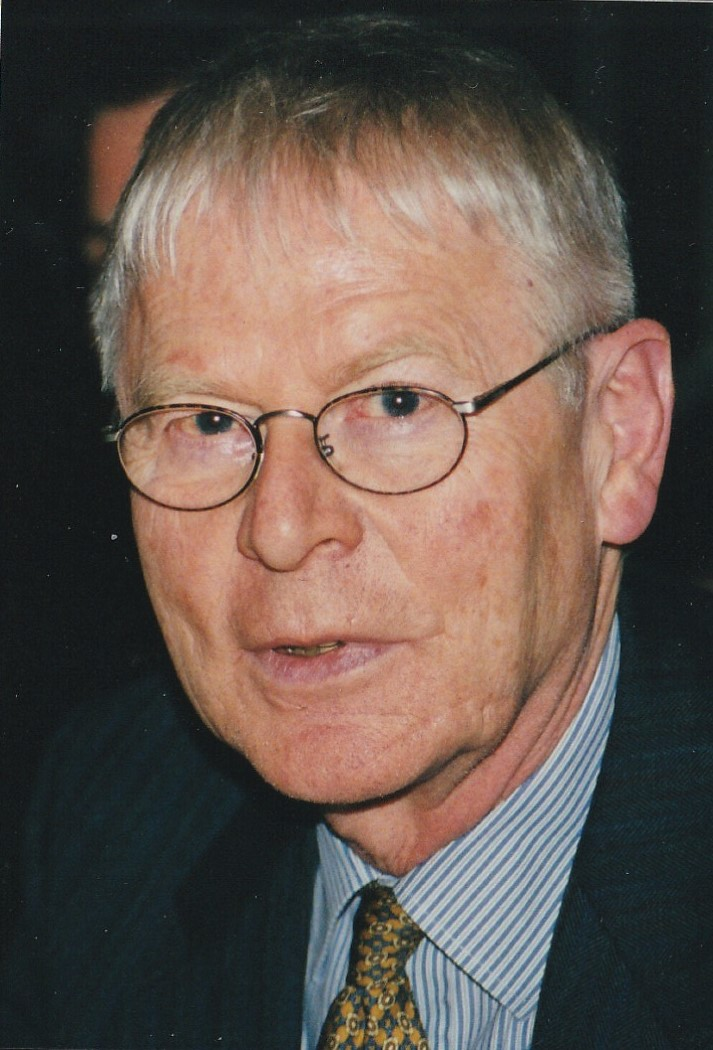
Jürgen Petersohn, photographed in 2000 by Werner Maleczek

Jürgen Petersohn (8 April 1935 – 20 July 2017) was a German historian best known for his researches on medieval history and the provincial history of Northeast Germany. He served as a professor of medieval history at Marburg University from 1981 to 2000.

Born in Merseburg, Petersohn was renowned for his contributions to the study of political intellectual history, history of Rome and the papacy including papal diplomacy in the Quattrocento, and the provincial histories of Franconia and Pomerania. He made significant contributions to the Monumenta Germaniae Historica as an editor and commentator, notably through his work on the earliest biography of Otto of Bamberg, known as the "Prüfening Vita".

== Life ==
Born in 1935 in Merseburg, Petersohn was the son of a senior official in the Prussian educational administration. In 1936, his family relocated to Koszalin in Pomerania, where he spent his early childhood and began his schooling. The town, a former residence of the Bishops of Cammin, profoundly influenced his worldview. Following the Second World War, his family fled to the West. During the escape, Petersohn, then in his fourth year of school, the only book he carried with him was Fritz Treichel's Geschichte der Stadt Köslin (History of the City of Köslin). In 1946, the family settled in Coburg in Upper Franconia, where they found refuge with relatives. Petersohn completed his secondary education at the Ernestinum Gymnasium in Coburg, passing his Abitur in 1954.

Between 1954 and 1960, Petersohn studied history, German studies, and philosophy at the universities of Würzburg, Marburg (under Heinrich Büttner), and Bonn (under Helmut Beumann). In Würzburg, he joined the Landsmannschaft Teutonia Würzburg, a student fraternity. From the summer semester of 1955, he received a scholarship from the German Academic Scholarship Foundation. In 1959, he earned his doctorate in Bonn under Walther Hubatsch with a dissertation on early modern history titled Markgraf Georg Friedrich von Brandenburg-Ansbach und Bayreuth als Herzog in Preußen 1578–1603 (Margrave Georg Friedrich of Brandenburg-Ansbach and Bayreuth as Duke in Prussia 1578–1603). He passed his first state examination for advanced teaching in German and history in January 1960.

From 1961 to 1964, Petersohn was a research fellow of the German Research Foundation. Between 1964 and 1970, he served as a research assistant at the Historical Seminar of the University of Würzburg, where Otto Meyer became a formative academic mentor, steering his research towards the Middle Ages. In 1970, he completed his habilitation in medieval history and auxiliary sciences of history in Würzburg with a study titled Sakralstruktur und Kultgeschichte des südlichen Ostseeraums (Sacred Structure and Religious History of the Southern Baltic Region). From 1970 to 1972, he was a senior assistant at Würzburg's Institute of History. His academic career progressed slowly; he held a temporary position at the University of Tübingen from 1971 to 1973, filling the chair vacated by Horst Fuhrmann. In Würzburg, he taught as an adjunct professor from 1975 and as an associate professor from 1978. A permanent appointment at Tübingen in 1976 fell through due to budget cuts.

At the age of 46, Petersohn succeeded Helmut Beumann as Professor of Medieval History at the University of Marburg in 1981. During the early 1980s, his lectures faced boycotts from Marxist student groups protesting societal issues like the NATO Double-Track Decision, nuclear power plants, and the Startbahn West runway expansion. At Marburg, he served as dean of the Faculty of History in 1985–86 and 1993–94, and mentored 16 doctoral students, including Holger Berwinkel, Otfried Krafft, Jörg Schwarz, and Peter Wiegand, as well as the habilitations of Matthias Thumser and Irmgard Fees. He built a significant academic following only in the 1990s.

From 1983, Petersohn was a member of the Konstanz Working Group for Medieval History, serving as its chairman from 1998 to 2001. He organised the group's 50th anniversary in 2001, publishing a bio-bibliographical documentation of its members and their works, along with the conference volume Mediaevalia Augiensia. Forschungen zur Geschichte des Mittelalters (Studies in Medieval History). He initiated conferences on "Politics and Saint Veneration in the High Middle Ages" held on Reichenau Island in 1990 and 1991, editing the resulting volume as the 42nd issue of Vorträge und Forschungen. Petersohn also wrote an extensive obituary for Helmut Beumann, a founding member and long-serving chairman of the group, published in the 43rd special issue of Vorträge und Forschungen. He coordinated the Hessian section of the working group in Marburg, Giessen, and Frankfurt for nearly two decades.

Petersohn was a member of the Historical Commission of Pomerania (1959), the Society for Franconian History (1968), the Johann Gottfried Herder Research Council (1973), and the Historical Commission of Hesse (1985). He became a corresponding member in 1991 and a full member in 1998 of the Academic Society at the Goethe University Frankfurt. In 1976, he received an honorary award associated with the Georg Dehio Cultural Prize, and in 1988, he was awarded the Pomeranian Cultural Prize. A festschrift in his honour, published on his 65th birthday, addressed themes such as imperial and papal history, the history of Rome, Quattrocento literature, and constitutional and legal history.

Petersohn became emeritus at the Marburg University in 2000 and continued to publish seven independent works. He maintained a strong connection to Würzburg, both biographically and through his research. After retirement, he returned to Würzburg, where, in 2007, he delivered a lecture on Franz Xaver von Wegele as Organiser of Historical Studies in Würzburg in the 19th Century to mark the 150th anniversary of the Würzburg Historical Seminar. In 2008, he published a seminal work, Franken im Mittelalter. Identität und Profil im Spiegel von Bewußtsein und Vorstellung (Franconia in the Middle Ages: Identity and Profile in the Mirror of Consciousness and Imagination). His final article, published in 2016 in the Mitteilungen des Instituts für Österreichische Geschichtsforschung, explored Franz Xaver Wegele and the appointment of the Carinthian Matthias Lexer to the University of Würzburg (1868/69).

Petersohn married in December 1964 and had three sons. He died on 20 July 2017 at the age of 82 in his home in Würzburg.

== Researches ==
Petersohn's research encompassed political intellectual history, educational and church history, Rome and the empire in the High Middle Ages, the provincial histories of Franconia and Northeast Germany, Humanism, the Christianization of Pomerania, the history of canonization and its instrumentalisation by emperors, and the conciliar movement in the 15th century. His work spanned a broad range, from the Northumbrian uncial script of the 8th century to the history of the Prussian estates in the 16th and early 17th centuries, and the history of science of the 19th and 20th centuries. His findings were published in 18 monographs and over 100 articles. Initially focused on early modern history, Petersohn produced around a dozen articles between 1957 and 1963, primarily on Prussian history, with his first two published during his student years. A six-month research stay in Rome in 1960–61 shifted his focus towards medieval themes.

=== Provincial History ===
==== Northeast German, Particularly Pomeranian, History ====
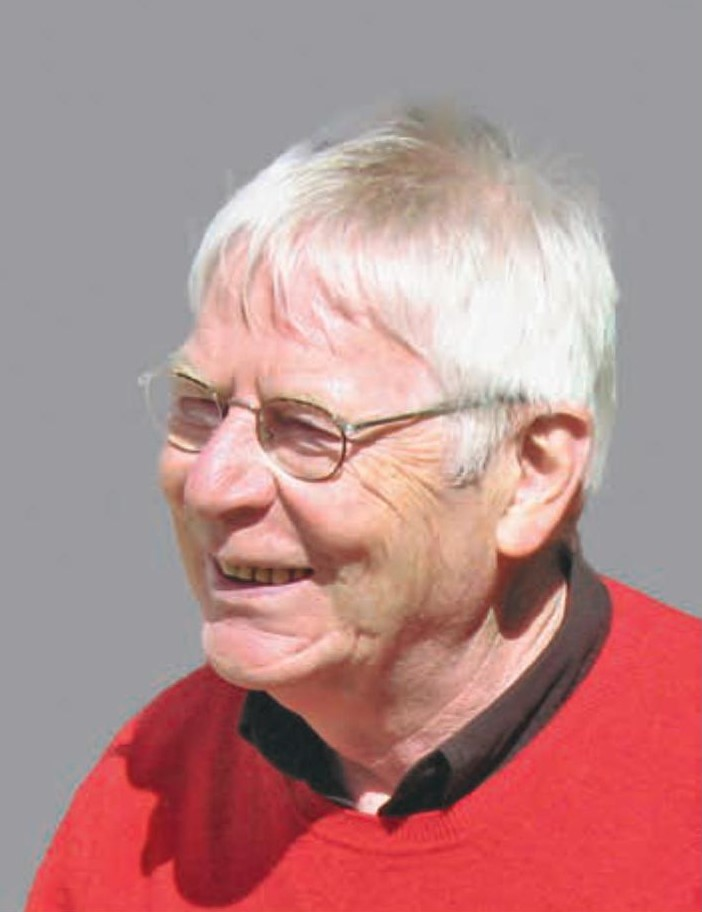
Jürgen Petersohn during an excursion of the Pomeranian Church History Association near Tallinn, Estonia, on 9 June 2006

From the early 1960s, Petersohn concentrated on the church history of Pomerania in the Middle Ages, reflecting his childhood connection to the region. His habilitation thesis explored the southern Baltic region within the ecclesiastical and political dynamics of the Empire, Poland, and Denmark from the 10th to the 13th centuries. It examined the emergence of the Obotritian and Pomeranian sacred spaces, focusing on mission activities, diocesan foundations, and the development of ecclesiastical structures. Published in 1979, this work became a standard reference for Pomeranian history during the missionary period. Petersohn defined the "sacred space" as ecclesiastical jurisdictions created in alignment with the political and tribal structures of the late Slavic period. He explored the gradual ecclesiastical penetration of the region, discussing the establishment of church organisation, the agents of mission, and the legal and cultural foundations of early ecclesiastical life. His analysis highlighted Henry the Lion as a key figure in shaping the Obotritian sacred space and traced the influence of Bolesław III Wrymouth and Otto of Bamberg in initiating Pomerania's Christianization, with Magdeburg later shaping it as a "religious daughter province". He also examined whether church patronages were introduced through German eastward settlement, concluding that religious influences played a secondary role to political and ecclesiastical developments. According to Rudolf Schieffer, the significance of the work lies in the fact that the author no longer views the topic one-sidedly from the perspective of German immigration, but rather focuses on the political entanglements, especially the genesis of regional identities through the shared veneration of saints in sacred spaces. The study was received more quickly and widely in Poland than in the Federal Republic of Germany.

In 1979, at a conference of the German-Polish Textbook Commission, Petersohn provided an overview of "Pomerania's constitutional relationship with neighbouring powers" up to the end of the Middle Ages, published in 1980 and translated into Polish in 1987. He also produced numerous studies on Pomeranian provincial and religious history, particularly in the 12th century, highlighting the significance of the castle hill and urban settlement of Usedom for the Duchy of Pomerania and its church.

His research extended to Mecklenburg and Holstein. In a 2003 article, he re-analysed Otto III's policies towards the Slavic tribes of the Baltic, Oder, and Elbe, focusing on events in 995, such as the Mecklenburg campaign, the privilege for the Diocese of Meissen, and the massacre of the Slavnikids.

==== Ethnogenesis and Identity of Franconia's Inhabitants in the Middle Ages ====
Petersohn also studied the ethnogenesis and identity of the Main region Franconia's inhabitants, referred to in medieval sources as East Franks (Franci orientales). His work began with an invitation from Andreas Kraus to update Franz-Josef Schmale's contribution on education, Latin literature, and intellectual currents for the revised edition of Max Spindler's Handbuch der bayerischen Geschichte (Handbook of Bavarian History) (1997). In 2008, after years of work, he published a comprehensive study on the evolving concept of Franconia from the Carolingians to the 16th century, dedicated to his mentor Otto Meyer. Drawing on onomastics, hagiography, legal history, and other fields, Petersohn also linked his findings to contemporary ethnogenetic questions, exploring the "cultural memory" as defined by Jan Assmann to delineate Franconia's identity. He structured his analysis into three periods: the formation of Franconian identity in the early and high Middle Ages, including the historical context of this development, and the emergence of a regional consciousness in the late Middle Ages, followed by identity challenges at the onset of the early modern period. He argued that Franconia emerged as a distinct spatial-ethnic entity by the late 8th century, solidified by the turn of the 10th century, and developed independently thereafter. His study, heavily focused on Würzburg, highlighted the central role of the veneration of Saint Kilian in shaping Franconian identity, with Würzburg remaining a focal point of a broader Franconian saint cult. The work, considered a foundational study on Franconian identity, sold out quickly.

=== Biographies and Legacy of Bishop Otto I of Bamberg ===
Another focus was the biographies and legacy of Otto of Bamberg, a prominent 12th-century prelate who christianized Pomerania. In 1966, Petersohn published a study on Otto's epithet "Apostolus Pomeranorum". In the 1960s, he proposed a new edition of Otto's earliest biography, the "Prüfening Vita", to the Monumenta Germaniae Historica. This work, composed between 1140 and 1146 at Prüfening Abbey, survives in four manuscripts of the late 12th-century Magnum Legendarium Austriacum. Petersohn critically reviewed Polish editions of Otto's biographies published between 1966 and 1974. He presented an initial version of his edition in Munich in 1988 but paused the project due to disagreements with an MGH collaborator. Resuming in the mid-1990s, he published the edition in 1999, clarifying the stemmatic relationships and questioning the presumed authorship of Wolfger of Prüfening and the potential identity of the author with the anonymous writer of the Vita Theogeri Mettensis. He attributed the numerous variants in the Zwettl manuscript to the scribe's dyslexia.

Petersohn analysed the content and structure of the Prüfening Vita, noting its omission of Otto's relations with the emperor and princes and his role in the imperial and universal Church, instead focusing on liturgical regulations, contemplation, Otto's organisational achievements, and his missionary work. In 2011, he published a study on fragments of an unknown version of Otto's biographies. Due to age and health issues, he abandoned plans to edit other biographies.

The canonized Bishop Otto was central to Petersohn's studies on mission, cult, and church in medieval Pomerania. Using Vatican documents, he demonstrated that Henning Iven, Bishop of Cammin, initially supported the Council of Basel during the conciliarism dispute but switched to the papal side in 1447 to strengthen his position against Kolberg. Petersohn extensively researched the Bishops of Cammin, contributing biographies to Erwin Gatz's volumes on the bishops of the Holy Roman Empire. In 2015, he published a study on the Bishops of Cammin, covering Adalbert and his 31 successors up to 1556.

=== Politics and Saint Veneration ===
In 1959, at a meeting of the Historical Commission for Pomerania, Petersohn presented methodological considerations for studying medieval saint veneration in Pomerania. He continued this research, extending beyond Pomerania to explore saint veneration, relic cults, and church patronages. In 1990 and 1991, he organised interdisciplinary conferences on "Politics and Saint Veneration in the High Middle Ages" on Reichenau Island, with the findings published in 17 articles in the 42nd volume of Vorträge und Forschungen. His own contribution examined emperorship and cultic acts in the Hohenstaufen era, and he concluded with a call for future research, including a typology of medieval city patrons.

=== History of Rome and the High Medieval Empire ===
Petersohn dedicated decades to the history of Rome, working at the German Historical Institute in Rome and accessing unpublished sources in the Vatican Apostolic Archive and Vatican Apostolic Library. From 1974, he published significant studies on Rome and the empire during the Salian and Hohenstaufen periods, including a foundational 1974 study on the 1188 treaty between the Roman Senate and Pope Clement III.

At a 1997 conference on the Wartburg, Petersohn discussed the only surviving golden bulla of the antiking Henry Raspe IV. He also examined a letter from the Romans to King Lothair III dated 18 May 1130, urging recognition of Anacletus II during the schism following Pope Honorius II's death. Petersohn highlighted the letter's significance for Rome's social and constitutional history, providing a new edition to facilitate further research.

He refuted Johannes Fried's hypothesis that Henry the Lion encountered the Tusculum bronze figure in Rome in 1155, potentially inspiring the Braunschweig Lion, citing a lack of evidence for Henry's visit. In 2009, Petersohn explored Rome's role under Henry V and its impact on imperial-Roman relations. His 2010 study, Kaisertum und Rom in spätsalischer und staufischer Zeit (Emperorship and Rome in Late Salian and Hohenstaufen Times), examined the interplay of Roman ideology and politics among the emperor, pope, and city commune, identifying Henry V as the initiator of this relationship.

=== The Basel Conciliar Attempt of Andreas Jamometić and Reactions from Emperor and Pope ===
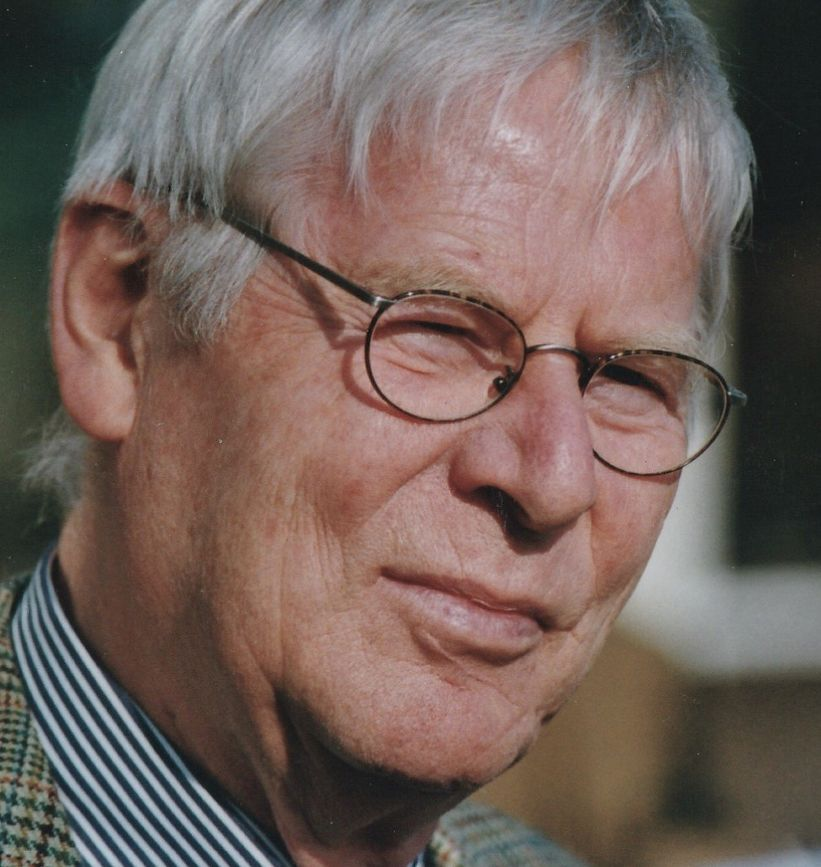
Jürgen Petersohn, photographed in 2004 by Werner Maleczek

At the 1974 German Historians' Conference, Petersohn proposed defining prosopography as the systematic collection of data on individuals within a defined spatial and temporal context. For the Late Middle Ages, he argued that prosopographical research required preliminary evaluation, creating an interplay between method and subject matter. His definition remains widely cited. Using this approach, he addressed questions in late medieval imperial and papal history.

During archival research in Italy and the Vatican, Petersohn focused on the papal diplomat Angelo Geraldini and the rebellious Croatian archbishop Andrea Jamometić. From 1979–80, with support from the German Research Foundation, he gathered material in Basel, Innsbruck, Vienna, Venice, and Florence on Jamometić's 1482 attempt to revive the Council of Basel and the responses from Emperor Frederick III and Pope Sixtus IV. His 1985 biography of Geraldini, who managed the Diocese of Cammin from 1482 to 1485 and countered Jamometić's conciliar activities, was followed by a 1987 edition of seven documents addressed to Sixtus IV and the College of Cardinals. In 2004, he published a study on Jamometić with an edition of 18 previously unpublished sources from 1479 to 1484, laying the groundwork for a biography of this controversial figure.

Petersohn compared a 1479 memorandum by Frederick III with an instruction for the legate Peter Knauer, highlighting differences that shed light on Frederick's curial policy. His 2015 monograph, Reichsrecht versus Kirchenrecht (Imperial Law versus Church Law), examined the dispute over jurisdiction concerning Jamometić, described as the "last great emperor-pope conflict of the Middle Ages". The conflict, conducted discreetly, revealed Frederick III's resolve to assert his authority against the papacy, challenging his historical depiction as the "arch-sleepyhead of the Empire".

=== Barbarossa's Governance Policy ===
Petersohn explored Frederick Barbarossa's governance in Germany and Italy. At a 1989 Reichenau conference, he proposed viewing Barbarossa as a "cipher" representing the driving force behind political actions, even when decisions were collective or anonymous. This concept faced criticism for implying interpretive ambiguity.

=== Royal Insignia and Ceremonial ===
Petersohn challenged the historiographical assumption that the imperial regalia were essential for a legitimate coronation. In the early 1990s, he argued that the correct coronation site and consecrator were more critical than the imperial crown in disputed coronations (1198 or 1314). The regalia provided a distinct form of legitimacy, symbolising a general claim to the empire rather than defining the start of rule.

=== History of Medieval Studies ===
Petersohn examined the impact of the emigration of Jewish and politically undesirable medievalists after 1933 on historiography, legal history, and Humanism research. He noted that émigré scholars in the Anglo-American sphere advanced intellectual and church history, influencing German research only marginally post-1945. He also analysed a 1938 letter by Otto Meyer to Edmund Ernst Stengel, addressing Meyer's draft obituary for Ulrich Stutz, which referenced Stutz's defense of Harry Bresslau against Paul Kehr's antisemitic critique, a passage omitted from the published version.

=== Memoria and Princely Self-Understanding in the High Middle Ages ===
Petersohn researched memorial culture and princely identity in the High Middle Ages, focusing on the Griffin dynasty's memoria in the 12th and early 13th centuries and the Ludovingians' self-understanding after their elevation to Thuringian landgraves in 1131. He identified a break in Ludovingian tradition under Hermann I (1190–1217) and Henry Raspe IV, particularly in their burial choices. The veneration of Saint Elisabeth of Hungary did not unify Ludovingian identity. His study of the De ortu principum Thuringie, likely written by a Reinhardsbrunn monk around 1180, highlighted its aim to trace the Ludovingians' rise to landgrave status.

== Selected works ==
A bibliography was published in: Thumser, Matthias; Wenz-Haubfleisch, Annegret; Wiegand, Peter (2000). Studien zur Geschichte des Mittelalters: Jürgen Petersohn zum 65. Geburtstag [Studies on the History of the Middle Ages: Jürgen Petersohn on his 65th birthday] (in German). Stuttgart: Kommissionsverl. K. Theiss. ISBN 978-3-8062-1448-2.

=== Monographs ===
- Petersohn, Jürgen (1963). "Fürstenmacht und Ständetum in Preußen während der Regierung Herzog Georg Friedrichs 1578-1603" [Princely Power and the Estates in Prussia during the Reign of Duke Georg Friedrich, 1578–1603]. Marburger Ostforschungen (in German). 20. Würzburg: Holzner-Verlag: 196.
- Petersohn, Jürgen (1963). "Das Breviarium Caminense der 2. Hälfte des 15. Jahrhunderts in der ehemaligen Preußischen Staatsbibliothek" [The Breviarium Caminese from the second half of the 15th century in the former Prussian State Library]. Veröffentlichungen der Historischen Kommission für Pommern. Reihe V: Forschungen zur pommerschen Geschichte (in German). VI (3). Böhlau Verlag: 91.
- Petersohn, Jürgen (1979). Der Südliche Ostseeraum im kirchlich-politischen Kräftespiel des Reichs, Polens und Dänemarks vom 10. bis 13. Jahrhundert: Mission, Kirchenorganisation, Kultpolitik [The Southern Baltic Region in the ecclesiastical and political power struggle between the Empire, Poland and Denmark from the 10th to the 13th century: mission, church organisation, cult politics]. Ostmitteleuropa in Vergangenheit und Gegenwart (in German). Vol. 17. Köln Wien: Böhlau. ISBN 978-3-412-04577-7.
- Petersohn, Jürgen (1985). Ein Diplomat des Quattrocento: Angelo Geraldini, 1422-1486 [A diplomat of the Quattrocento: Angelo Geraldini, 1422–1486] (in German). Tübingen: M. Niemeyer. ISBN 978-3-484-82062-3.
- Petersohn, Jürgen (1994). Rom und der Reichstitel Sacrum Romanum Imperium [Rome and the imperial title Sacrum Romanum Imperium]. Sitzungsberichte der Wissenschaftlichen Gesellschaft an der Johann Wolfgang Goethe-Universität Frankfurt am Main (in German). Stuttgart: Steiner. ISBN 978-3-515-06562-7.
- Petersohn, Jürgen; Schwarz, Jörg; Früh, Martin; Beumann, Helmut (1997). Helmut Beumann (1912–1995). Vorträge und Forschungen / Konstanzer Arbeitskreis für Mittelalterliche Geschichte Sonderband (in German). Sigmaringen: Thorbecke. ISBN 978-3-7995-6751-0.
- Petersohn, Jürgen (2002). Heinrich Raspe und die Apostelhäupter oder die Kosten der Rompolitik Kaiser Friedrichs II: vorgelegt am 4. Mai 2002 in einer Sitzung der Wissenschaftlichen Gesellschaft an der Johann Wolfgang Goethe-Universität Frankfurt am Main [Heinrich Raspe and the Apostle Heads, or the Costs of Emperor Frederick II's Policy Towards Rome: presented on 4 May 2002 at a meeting of the Scientific Society at Johann Wolfgang Goethe University in Frankfurt am Main]. Sitzungsberichte der Wissenschaftlichen Gesellschaft an der Johann Wolfgang Goethe-Universität Frankfurt am Main (in German). Stuttgart: F.Steiner. ISBN 978-3-515-08211-2.
- Petersohn, Jürgen (2008). Konstanzer Arbeitskreis für Mittelalterliche Geschichte Sonderband (ed.). Franken im Mittelalter: Identität und Profil im Spiegel von Bewußtsein und Vorstellung [Franconia in the Middle Ages: Identity and profile reflected in consciousness and imagination]. Vorträge und Forschungen (in German). Ostfildern: Thorbecke. ISBN 978-3-7995-6761-9.
- Petersohn, Jürgen (2010). Kaisertum und Rom in spätsalischer und staufischer Zeit: Romidee und Rompolitik von Heinrich V. bis Friedrich II [The Empire and Rome in the late Salian and Hohenstaufen periods: the idea of Rome and Roman politics from Henry V to Frederick II]. Monumenta Germaniae Historica (in German). Hannover: Hahnsche Buchhandlung. ISBN 978-3-7752-5762-6.
- Petersohn, Jürgen (2015). Reichsrecht versus Kirchenrecht: Kaiser Friedrich III. im Ringen mit Papst Sixtus IV. um die Strafgewalt über den Basler Konzilspronuntiator Andreas Jamometić 1482 - 1484 [Imperial law versus canon law: Emperor Frederick III in conflict with Pope Sixtus IV over jurisdiction over the Basel Council pronouncer Andreas Jamometić, 1482–1484]. Forschungen zur Kaiser- und Papstgeschichte des Mittelalters (in German). Köln Weimar Wien: Böhlau. ISBN 978-3-412-22375-5.

=== Editions ===
- Petersohn, Jürgen (1999). Die Prüfeninger Vita Bischof Ottos von Bamberg nach der Fassung der Grossen österreichischen Legendars [The Prüfeninger Vita of Bishop Otto of Bamberg according to the version of the Great Austrian Legendary]. Scriptores rerum germanicarum in usum scholarum ex Monumenta germania historicio separatim editi (in German). Hannover: Hahnsche Buchhandlung. ISBN 978-3-7752-5471-7.
- Geraldini, Angelo (1987). Petersohn, Jürgen (ed.). Diplomatische Berichte und Denkschriften des päpstlichen Legaten Angelo Geraldini aus der Zeit seiner Basel-Legation (1482–1483) [Diplomatic reports and memoranda by Papal Legate Angelo Geraldini from the period of his legation to Basel (1482–1483)]. Historische Forschungen (in German). Stuttgart: Steiner-Verl.-Wiesbaden. ISBN 978-3-515-05026-5.

=== Edited volumes ===
- Petersohn, Jürgen (1994). Politik und Heiligenverehrung im Hochmittelalter [Politics and the veneration of saints in the High Middle Ages]. Vorträge und Forschungen (in German). Sigmaringen: J. Thorbecke. ISBN 978-3-7995-6642-1.
- Schwarz, Jörg; Petersohn, Jürgen (2001). Der Konstanzer Arbeitskreis für mittelalterliche Geschichte 1951-2001: die Mitglieder und ihr Werk eine Bio-bibliographische Dokumentation [The Constance Working Group for Medieval History 1951–2001: its members and their work a bio-bibliographical documentation]. Veröffentlichungen des Konstanzer Arbeitskreises für mittelalterliche Geschichte aus Anlass seines fünfzigjährigen Bestehens 1951-2001 (in German). Stuttgart: J. Thorbecke. ISBN 978-3-7995-6906-4.
