= François Louis Ganshof =

Belgian medievalist

- Born: 14 March 1895; Bruges, Belgium
- Died: 26 July 1980 (aged 85); Brussels, Belgium

François Louis Ganshof (14 March 1895 – 26 July 1980) was a Belgian medievalist.

== Life ==
After studies at the Athénée Royal, he attended the University of Ghent, where he came under the influence of Henri Pirenne. After studies with Ferdinand Lot, he practiced law for a period, before returning to the University of Ghent. Here, he succeeded Pirenne in 1930 as professor of medieval history, after Pirenne left the university as a result of the enforcement of Dutch as language of instruction. He remained there until his retirement in 1961.

== Scholar ==
Ganshof's work was primarily on Flanders in the Carolingian period. His most well known book is Qu'est-ce que la féodalité? (1944). Here, he defines feudalism narrowly, in simple legal and military terms. Feudalism, in Ganshof's view, existed only within the nobility. This contrasts with Marc Bloch, where feudalism encompasses society as a whole, and Susan Reynolds, who questions the concept of feudalism in itself.

Though Ganshof's definition is not always accepted today, this book was not his only work. He contributed greatly to his field, mostly through articles. Among the few books he published were Les Destinées de l'Empire en occident de 395 à 888 (1928) and Flandre sous les premiers comtes (1943). In 1946, he received the Francqui Prize for Human Sciences.

Ganshof was renowned as the greatest European expert on the Frankish kingdoms, particularly under the Carolingian dynasty; he never wrote the definitive biography of Charlemagne that everyone expected of him, but his contributions to Frankish history continue to be fundamental. The best English-language introduction to this (very major) aspect of his work is in F.L. Ganshof, The Carolingians and the Frankish Monarchy. Studies in Carolingian History, tr. Janet Sondheimer (London: Longman, 1971). This collection of major articles ends with an exhaustive bibliography of Ganshof's writings on Merovingian and Carolingian history down to 1970.

== Selected works ==
- 1926. Étude sur les ministeriales en Flandrie et en Lotharingie. Brussels.
- 1928 (with Ferdinand Lot and Christian Pfister). Les Destinées de l'Empire en occident de 395 à 888. In Histoire du Moyen Âge.
- 1937. "Die mittelalterlichen Städte Flanderns und Brabants." Forschungen und Fortschritte 13. 170–2.
- 1937. De staatsinstellingen van Vlaanderen en Brabant.
- 1938. "Die Rechtsprechung des gräflichen Hofgerichtes in Flandern vor der Mitte des 13. Jahrhunderts." Zeitschrift der Savigny-Stiftung für Rechtsgeschichte. Germanist. Abt. 58 = Festschrift Ulrich Stutz zum siebzigsten Geburtstag. 163–77.
- 1938. "Die mittelalterlichen Städte Flanderns und Brabants." Forschungen und Fortschritte 13. 170–2.
- 1938. "The Mediaeval Cities of Flanders and Brabant." Research and progress 4.2. 62–6.
- 1941. Voorstel tot voorbereiding en uitgave van een Historisch Woordenboek der Nederlandsche Rechtstaal. Met een verslag door E.I. Strubbe. Mededelingen van de Koninklijke Vlaamse Academie voor wetenschappen, letteren en schone kunsten van België. Kl. der letteren (henceforward abbreviated to Mededelingen) 3.3. Brussels.
- 1941. Over stadsontwikkeling tusschen Loire en Rijn gedurende de Middeleeuwen. Antwerpen. 2nd ed.: Antwerp, 1944.
- 1941. Pages d'histoire. Brussels.
- 1943. Étude sur le développement des villes entre Loire et Rhin au Moyen Âge. Paris.
- 1943. Flandre sous les premiers comtes. Brussels.
- 1944. Qu'est-ce que la féodalité. Translated into English as Feudalism by Philip Grierson, foreword by F.M. Stenton. 1st ed.: New York and London, 1952; 2nd ed: 1961; 3d ed: 1976.
- 1944. Vlaanderen onder de eerste graven. Antwerp.
- 1946-7. Geschiedenis van de Middeleeuwsche instellingen: de instellingen van West-Europa. Ghent.
- 1948. Het falen van Karel de Grote. Utrecht.
- 1949. The imperial coronation of Charlemagne: theories and facts. Lecture on the David Murray Foundation 16. Glasgow.
- 1951. Encyclopaedie van de geschiedenis: middeleeuwen. Ghent.
- 1953. Le moyen âge. Histoire des relations internationales 1. Paris.
- 1953. Over het idee van het Keizerschap bij Lodewijk de Vrome tijdens het eerste deel van zijn regering. Mededelingen 15.9. Brussels.
- 1955. Wat waren de capitularia?. Brussels.
- 1956. Het statuut van de vreemdeling in het Frankische Rijk. Mededelingen 18.3. Brussels.
- 1957. "Einwohnergenossenschaft und Graf in den flandrischen Städten während des 12. Jahrhunderts." Zeitschrift der Savigny-Stiftung für Rechtsgeschichte. Germanist. Abt. 74. 98-118.
- 1958. Het tolwezen in het Frankisch rijk onder de Merowingen. Mededelingen 20.4. Brussels.
- 1959. Het tolwezen in het Frankisch rijk onder de Karolingen. Mededelingen 21.1. Brussels.
- 1960. De internationale betrekkingen van het Frankisch rijk onder de Merowingen. Mededelingen 22.4. Brussels.
- 1961. Was ist das Lehnswesen?, tr. from the French by Ruth and Dieter Groh. Darmstadt.
- 1961. Was waren die Kapitularien? (with Birgit Franz), tr. Willem A. Eckhardt. Weimar.
- 1963. De internationale betrekkingen van het Frankisch rijk onder de Karolingen. Mededelingen 25.2. Brussels.
- 1963. Het "Iudicium crucis" in het frankisch Recht. Mededelingen 25.5. Brussels.
- 1965. Een kijk op de verhoudingen tussen normatieve beschikkingen en levend recht in het Karolingische rijk. Mededelingen 27.2. Brussels.
- 1965. "Note sur une charte de Thierry d'Alsace, comte de Flandre, intéressant la propriété foncière à Saint-Omer." Festschrift für Hektor Ammann. Wiesbaden. 84–96. Reproduced as monograph: Studia historica Gandensia 36. Ghent.
- 1966. Een historicus uit de VIe eeuw: Gregorius van Tours. Mededelingen 28.5. Brussels.
- 1966. "Note sur une charte de Baudouin V, comte de Flandre, pour Saint-Pierre de Lille." In Mélanges René Crozet. Vol 1. Poitiers. 293–306. Reproduced as monograph: Studia historica Gandensia 37. Ghent.
- 1967. Een kijk op het regeringsbeleid van Lodewijk de Vrome tijdens de Jaren 814 tot 830. Mededelingen 29.2. Brussels.
- 1967. "Note sur la preuve dans la procédure en cas de flagrant délit en droit franc." In Miscellanea mediaevalia in memoriam Jan Frederik Niermeyer. Groningen. 9-16. Reproduced as monograph: Studia historica Gandensia 77. Ghent.
- 1968. Frankish Institutions under Charlemagne. Translated from the French by Bryce and Mary Lyon. Providence (Rhode Island), 1968.
- 1969. Bekentenis en foltering in het Frankisch Recht. Amsterdam.
- 1970. Een historicus uit de VIIe eeuw: Fredegarius. Mededelingen 32.5. Brussels.
- 1971. The Carolingians and the Frankish monarchy. Studies in Carolingian history
- 1971. Een historicus uit de IXe eeuw: Nithard. Mededelingen 33.3. Brussels.
- 1972. Aantekeningen over het grondbezit van de Sint-Bertijnsabdij en in het bijzonder over haar domein te Poperinge tijdens de IXe eeuw. Mededelingen 34.1. Brussels.
- 1972. "Stämme als "Träger des Reiches?" Zu Walther Kienasts Studien über die französischen Volksstämme des Frühmittelalters." Zeitschrift der Savigny-Stiftung für Rechtsgeschichte. Germanist. Abt. 89. 147-60.
- 1975. Le polyptyque de l'abbaye de Saint-Bertin, 844-859.
