= Statue of Germanicus (Amelia) =

Ancient Roman sculpture

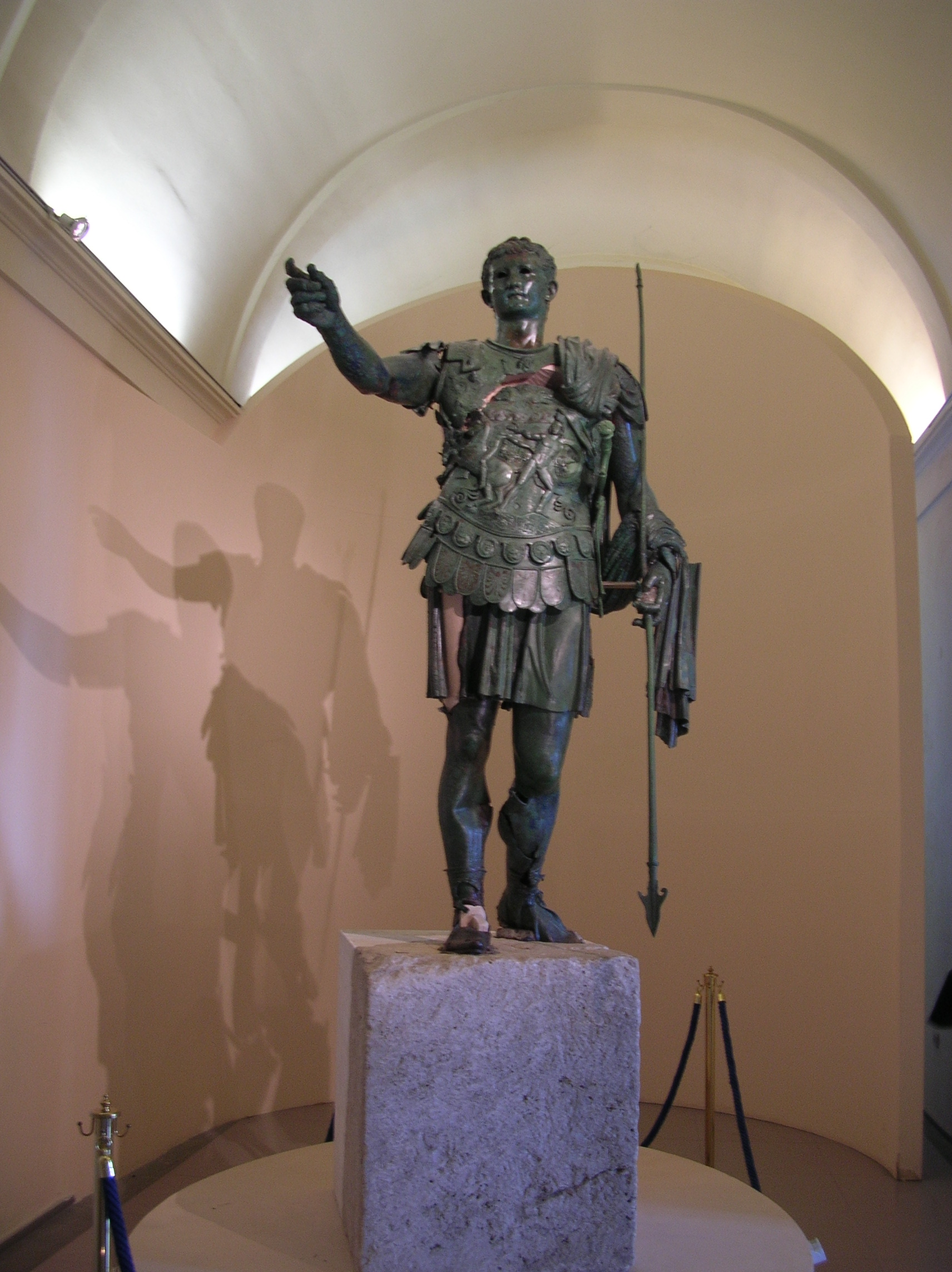
Statue of Germanicus on display at Museo civico di Amelia

The bronze statue of Germanicus is one of the most important Roman-period finds from Amelia, Italy. Discovered in 1963 during excavation work for a mill, the statue was found in many scattered fragments. Restoration later reassembled it.

It is now displayed in the archaeological museum of Amelia.

== Discovery ==
Excavation in August 1963 revealed numerous bronze fragments of the statue. Damage from the excavation machinery scattered and broke many pieces, making reconstruction difficult. A long restoration process recovered the overall form of the figure.

== Description ==
The figure is identified as Germanicus by its specific portrait features and hairstyle, corresponding to his third portrait type (Gabii type). This type is associated with the beginning of the reign of his son Caligula.

The head is a replacement: the original likely depicted Caligula, whose image was removed after his assassination in 41 AD, and replaced with that of Germanicus. The statue was produced using the indirect lost-wax method and likely made in Rome before being transported to Ameria.

The figure stands with its weight on the right leg, while the left leg is slightly bent at the knee. It wears leather sandals tied with straps around the ankles. Over a light linen tunic, visible at the shoulders and upper arms, the figure wears an anatomical cuirass with shoulder guards, decorated in relief on both the front and back.

Two rows of pteryges hang below the edge of the cuirass. The upper row is rounded and decorated with alternating lion and satyr heads. The lower row is longer, partly overlapping, and decorated with palmettes.

The head turns slightly to the right, in the direction of the raised right arm, which is held in a gesture of address. The left arm is bent, holding a spear and part of a cloak that falls from the shoulder. A sword in its sheath hangs at the left side.

The back of the cuirass, though damaged, shows two female figures beside a candelabrum. The front includes a scene of Scylla raising her right arm to throw a stone, surrounded by dog heads and waves below. The central scene depicts Achilles attacking Troilus. Achilles stands facing forward, helmeted, holding a shield with his left hand and grabbing Troilus by the hair with his right. Troilus, partly covered by a cloak, struggles on a rearing horse.
