= Luca Pellegrini (swimmer) =

Italian swimmer

Personal information
- Born: 31 March 1964 (age 62) Amelia, Terni, Italy

Sport
- Sport: Swimming
Medal record
Men's swimming
Representing Italy
Mediterranean Games
Gold medal – first place	1987 Latakia	1500 m freestyle

Luca Pellegrini (born 31 March 1964 in Amelia) is an Italian former swimmer who competed in the 1988 Summer Olympics.
