= Firmina =

4th-century Roman saint

Saint Firmina
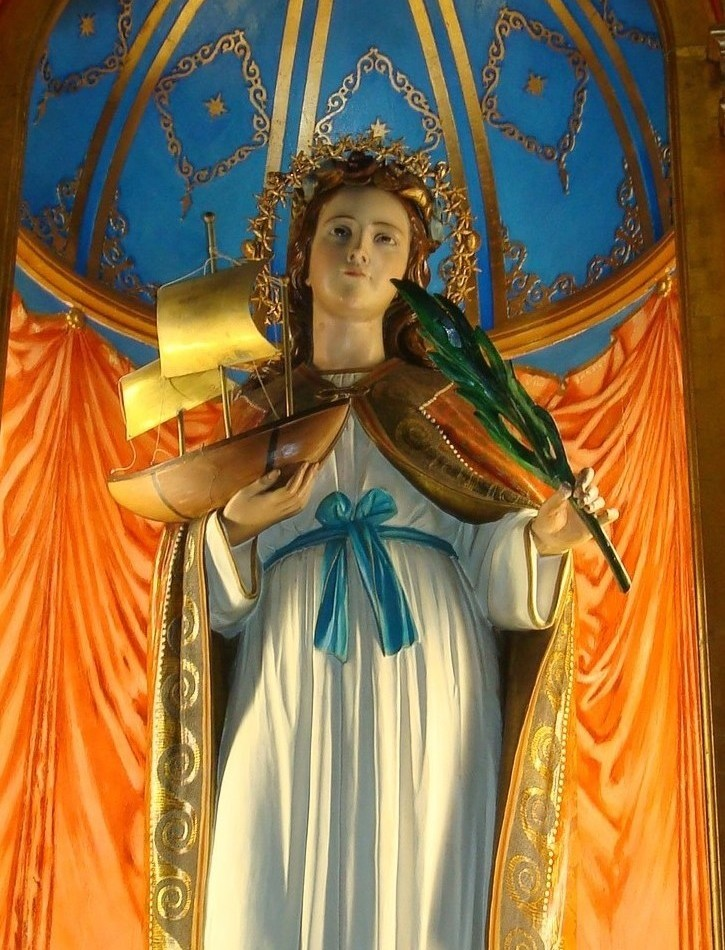
- Statue of Santa Fermina in St. Francis of Assisi Cathedral in Civitavecchia

Martyr
- Died: 3rd century
- Venerated in: Roman Catholic Church
- Major shrine: Amelia Cathedral
- Feast: 24 November; 20 December (translation, in Civitavecchia)
- Attributes: palm frond
- Patronage: Amelia, Italy; Civitavecchia, Italy

Firmina of Rome was an early-Christian virgin martyr and is venerated as a saint. She is the patron saint of Civitavecchia, and the Amelia Cathedral is dedicated to her.

== Life ==
Firmina is said to have lived in the 3rd century and to have suffered martyrdom during the persecution of Diocletian, but all information about her comes from a vita written not earlier than the 6th century. Later oral tradition has supplemented this with sometimes conflicting detail.

The simplest version of her legend is that she belonged to a family of high status: her father Calpurnius was prefect of the city of Rome (praefectus urbis). Olympiadis, a high official, attempted to seduce her but was converted by her to the Christian faith, for which he was martyred. She then left her family to devote herself to prayer in seclusion, near the city of Amelia in Umbria, where she suffered martyrdom during the persecution of Diocletian and was buried. Other versions claim that she was martyred and buried in Civitavecchia.

Many miracles are attributed to her, one of which occurred during a sea passage to Centumcellae, the present Civitavecchia, when a sudden violent storm was calmed by her miraculous intervention. Firmina is said to have lived for a time in a grotto near the port, over which was later built the Forte Michelangelo.

She is often linked with two other virgin martyrs of Umbria, Felicissima and Illuminata. It has been suggested that all three are local cults of a single saint, the African martyr Firmina commemorated in the Martyrologium Hieronymianum in October.

== Veneration ==
Firmina's burial in Amelia is celebrated on 24 November, but her burial in Civitavecchia on 20 December. Her iconographical attribut is the martyr's palm.

In Civitavecchia a procession in her honour is held on neither of the above dates but on 28 April. Firmina's statue is carried down to the harbour and put on board a ship which takes it to the site of the ancient lighthouse, while the other ships and fishing boats sound their horns in celebration.

== Sources and external links ==
- Santiebeati: Firmina (in Italian)
