= Giovanni Francesco Perini =

Italian painter

Giovanni Francesco Perini (active 15th to 16th centuries) was an Italian painter of the early Renaissance active mainly around Amelia, Umbria, Italy.

He was a pupil of Raphael at his workshop at the Vatican. He painted a Last Supper for the Amelia Cathedral. He also painted in Vitorchiano, Tuscanica and in Narni. He also completed stucco-work. He was a relative of the painters Giulio and Bartolomeo Perini.
