= Amelia, Umbria =

Amelia
- Comune
- Città di Amelia
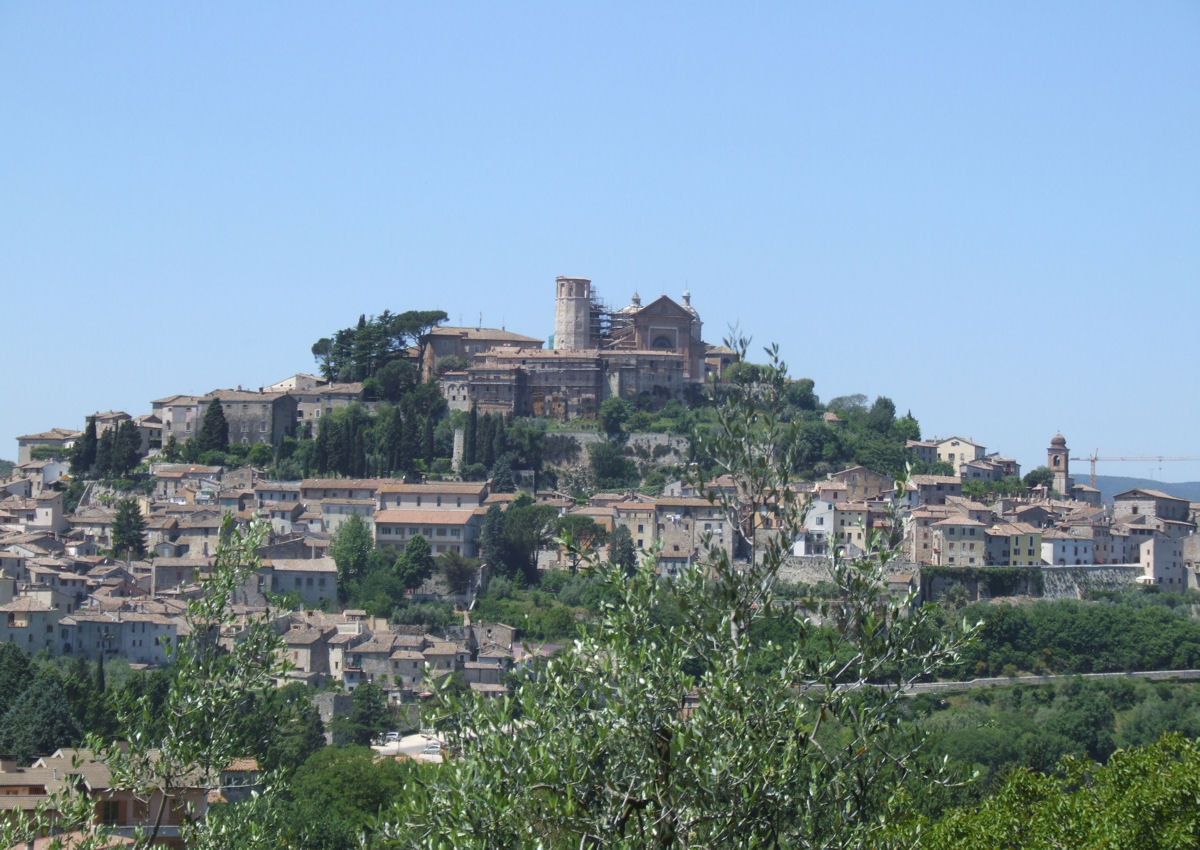
- View of Amelia, Umbria

- Coat of arms

- Location within Italy Location within Umbria
- Coordinates: 42.558862°N 12.411985°E
- Country: Italy
- Region: Umbria
- Province: Terni (TR)

Government
  - Mayor: Laura Pernazza

Area
  - Total: 132 km^{2} (51 sq mi)
- Elevation: 370 m (1,210 ft)

Population (1 January 2025)
  - Total: 11,474
  - Density: 86.9/km^{2} (225/sq mi)
- Demonym: Amerini
- Time zone: UTC+1 (CET)
  - Summer (DST): UTC+2 (CEST)
- Postal code: 05022
- Dialing code: 0744
- Patron saint: Saint Fermina
- Saint day: November 24
- Website: Official website

Amelia is a town and comune located in central Italy which is part of the province of Terni. The city is located in Umbria not far from the border with Lazio.

== Etymology ==
Amelia was known in antiquity by several names. It was called Αμερία and also Αμέριον by Stephanus of Byzantium, and Ameria by the Romans.

== History ==
=== Antiquity ===
According to Cato, the city was founded 964 years before the Third Macedonian War, corresponding to 1135 BC. Although this date cannot be assigned certain historical value, it attests to the great antiquity attributed to the city. Remains of its ancient walls, constructed in the polygonal or Pelasgian style, testify to its power in very remote times.

Some scholars attribute Amelia's origins to the Umbri or to the Aborigines. Another tradition, associated with Pliny the Younger, places its foundation in 1136 BC and ascribes it either to Amisio, said to be a king of the Aborigines, or to Amelia, presented as a supposed princess of Veii. The city later came under Etruscan influence.

A key stage in the town's development came in 240 BC with the opening of the Via Amerina. This road provided a direct route between Rome and Umbria through Faliscan and Etruscan territory. Around this time, the town began to take on an urban form.

During the wars against Hannibal, troops from Amelia under Piso fought to oppose Hannibal's advance. In the Roman period Amelia was a prosperous Roman municipium, enrolled in the Clustumina tribe.

The name Ameria does not appear during the wars of Rome against the Umbrians and is first encountered in the time of Cicero. Cicero repeatedly mentioned the city in his defense of Sextus Roscius, who had been born in Ameria, referring to it as a flourishing municipality whose fertile territory, rich in fruit and willow plants, extended to the Tiber.

Under Augustus its lands were divided among veterans, although the city did not receive the title of colony.

The Tabula Peutingeriana marks a road that branched from the Via Clodia at Baccano, passed through Nepi and Falerii, reached Ameria, and from there continued to Todi. This road corresponds to the Via Amerina, also known from inscriptions.

Amelia is said to have had many early Christian communities. It is recorded as a bishop's seat from the 4th century, and the diocese is dated to around 344. Among the candidates named as earliest bishops of Amelia are Ortodolfo, Ilario, and Mauro. A Roman council was held in Amelia in the year 415.

At a later stage the city was destroyed by the Goths.

=== Middle Ages ===
Under Pope Gregory II the city, freed from obedience to Leo the Isaurian, was placed under the Roman Church. In 731 Liutprand, king of the Lombards, seized the city, and although compelled to withdraw his forces from the lands of the Church and retreat to Pavia, he retained possession of Amelia and other Umbrian cities. Pope Zachary later recovered these territories for the Church. The city was one of the sixteen that formed the Duchy of Rome.

Pope Leo IV fortified Amelia and Orte against Saracen incursions.

The date at which Amelia became a self-governing city is stated to be unknown. In 1065 it fought alongside Todi and Foligno against Perugia, Orvieto, and Gubbio. Around this period it was ruled by consuls elected from the leading citizens.

In 1208 a peace agreement with Todi was concluded in front of the Abbey of San Secondo in Amelia. Todi interpreted the agreement as an act of submission, and efforts to control Amelia are described as recurring, linked to traffic along the Via Amerina.

In 1240 Amelia was sacked by the troops of Frederick II. After this, a decline is said to have begun, with Amelia drawn into Guelph–Ghibelline conflicts and with continued attempts by Todi to assert supremacy. In 1330 the city adopted municipal statutes.

In the fortress of Amelia Pope Urban VI imprisoned Cardinal Tommaso Orsini as punishment for having stirred up a sedition in Viterbo against the new papal legate. At the request of certain princes, Orsini was later released.

In the mid-14th century Amelia’s policy was influenced by Cardinal Gil Albornoz, who lifted various obligations that Amelia owed to Todi. In the late 14th and early 15th century Amelia suffered famine, worsened by taxes from Rome and by extortion by mercenary captains. Under Pope Martin V, privileges were confirmed and a recovery began.

In 1476, following a severe pestilence, Pope Sixtus IV took refuge in Amelia accompanied by six cardinals and was received as a guest by the noble Giraldini family, who later placed a commemorative inscription on the façade of their palace in memory of the event.

=== Early Modern and Contemporary era ===
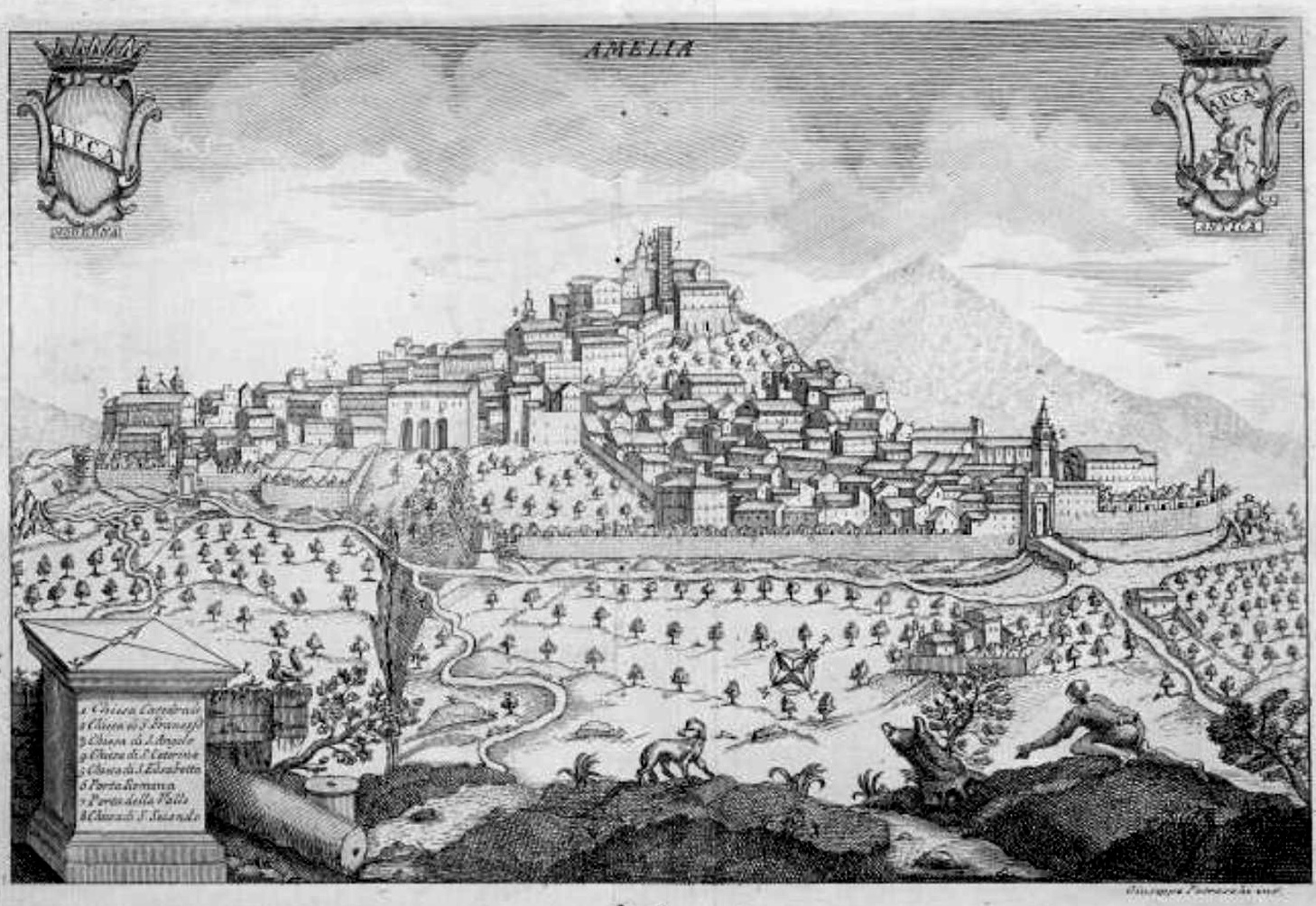
18th century view of Amelia

In its later history Amelia was tied entirely to the Papal States. In 1595 Antonio Maria Graziani, bishop of Amelia, held a diocesan synod in the city in which, among other matters, carnival festivities were condemned.

In the Napoleonic era it was raised to a canton in the Todi district, within the Department of Trasimeno, whose capital was at Spoleto. In 1816 Amelia was classed as a community with a resident governor and placed in the Delegation of Spoleto.

In the mid-19th century the city had 6,124 inhabitants. Of these, 2,289 resided within the city and 3,835 lived in the numerous rural hamlets of the countryside.

In 1848–1849 many volunteers from Amelia took part in the Roman Republic uprisings, and in 1859 local patriots joined insurrectionary movements. On 21 September 1860 Piedmontese troops under General Brignone entered Amelia, and the city became part of the new unified state.

In 1876 Porchiano del Monte, formerly an independent municipality, became a subdivision of Amelia.

== Geography ==
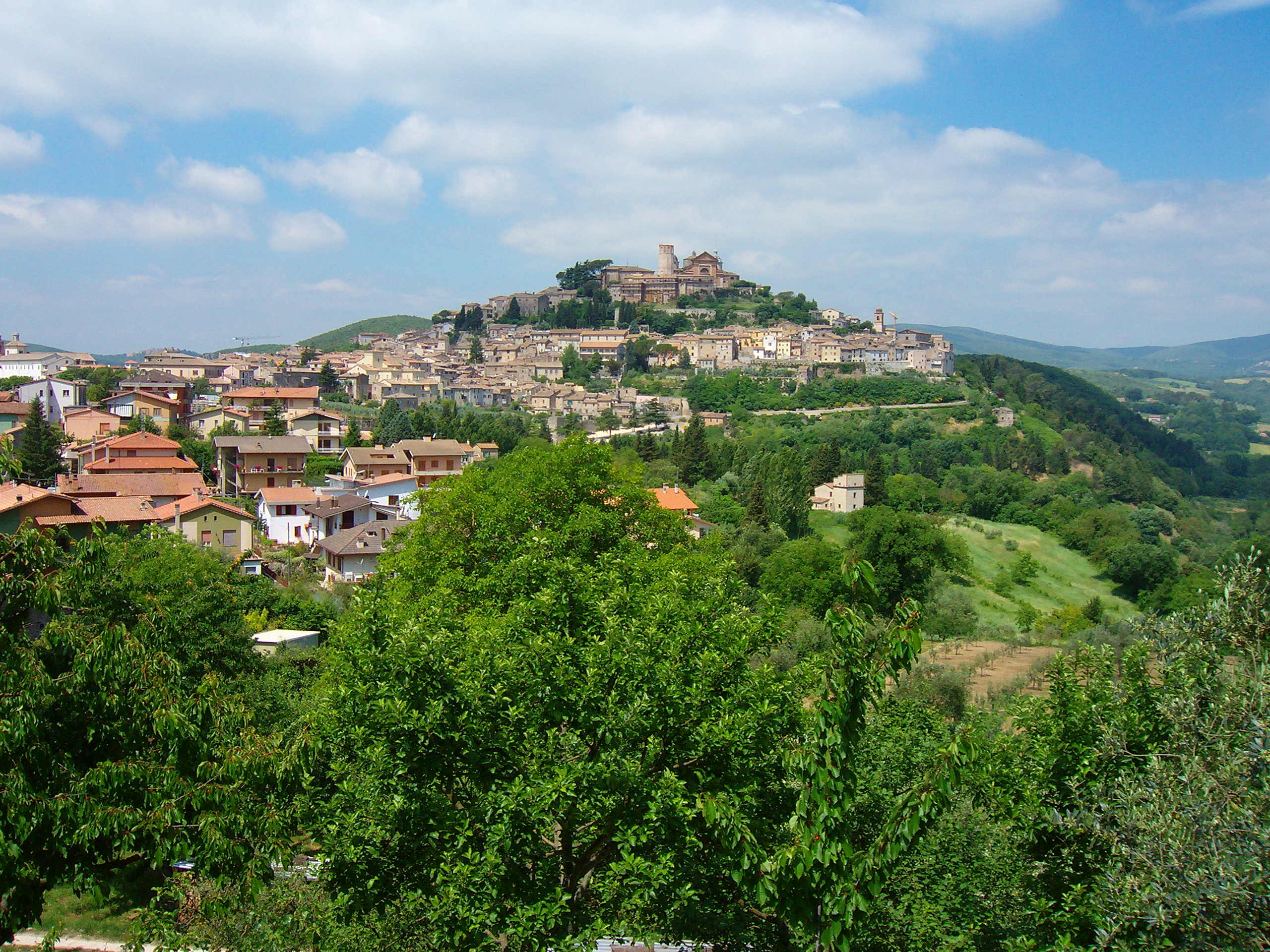
Panorama of Amelia

Amelia is situated 24 kilometres (15 mi) from Terni and 13 kilometres (8.1 mi) from Narni on the slope of a hill at an elevation of about 406 metres (1,332 ft) above sea level, between the valley of the Tiber and that of the Nera, not far from the point where these rivers meet. The town occupies a position with a difference in elevation of about 75 metres (246 ft) across the settlement.

Near the town is the Lago Vecchio ("Old Lake") formed by a dam on a small river, the Rio Grande. Rowing boats can be rented to come around in the shade of alder, poplar and willow trees, looking for sometimes surprised ducks and herons. There is a small park called La Cavallerizza, a former horse racing track, with a walking — or jogging — path around the track, now used for weekend dances and social gatherings.

=== Subdivisions ===
The municipality includes the localities of Amelia, Archileggi, Casetta, Collicello, Foce, Fornaci, Fornole, Macchie, Montecampano, Montenero, Porchiano, Sambucetole, Santa Maria, Testa di Lepre.

In 2021, 2,922 people lived in rural dispersed dwellings not assigned to any named locality. At the time, most of the population lived in Amelia proper (5,842), and Fornole (1,215).

Montecampano lies 4 miles (6.4 km) from the city and takes its name from its position on a mountain with an extensive outlook that from a distance resembles a large plain.

Foce lies about 3 miles (4.8 km) from Amelia on a steep and rugged hill with a wide horizon, and is surrounded by extensive forests.

Fornole stands on a small hill with an open outlook toward the west and south. Near Fornole runs the Cammartano stream, crossed by a bridge. Fornole is home to the Romanesque church of San Silvestro, with an interesting fresco cycle showing the saint freeing the town from the grasp of a dragon.

The village of Porchiano del Monte has Medieval walls featuring a number of guard towers, and a small Romanesque church, San Simeone. The church of S. Timoteo, also Romanesque, has 14th- and 15th-century frescoes.

== Economy ==
In the mid-19th century the surrounding territory was described as fertile, yielding abundant grain and maize, wine, oil, and various fruits. Almonds were produced, as well as the abundant pizzutello grape and other select varieties of grapes. Large woodlands served as pasture for numerous herds of swine that were exported abroad. The cultivation of silkworms and bees was well developed. The area was known for the preparation of dried plums and particularly fine dried figs. Potash was also manufactured.

=== Dried figs ===
Amelia is associated with the production of dried figs, known since antiquity. In the Middle Ages the inhabitants were said to deliver annually to the pope "centum pignatuli ficuum", or one hundred small pots of figs.

A local confection known as Fichi Girotti consists of dried figs filled with chocolate and dried fruit. The product has been manufactured by the Girotti family since 1830. The figs are prepared by selecting dried figs and filling them with almonds, walnuts, candied fruit and cocoa before pressing them into their characteristic wheel‑shaped form.

== Religion ==
=== Cathedral ===
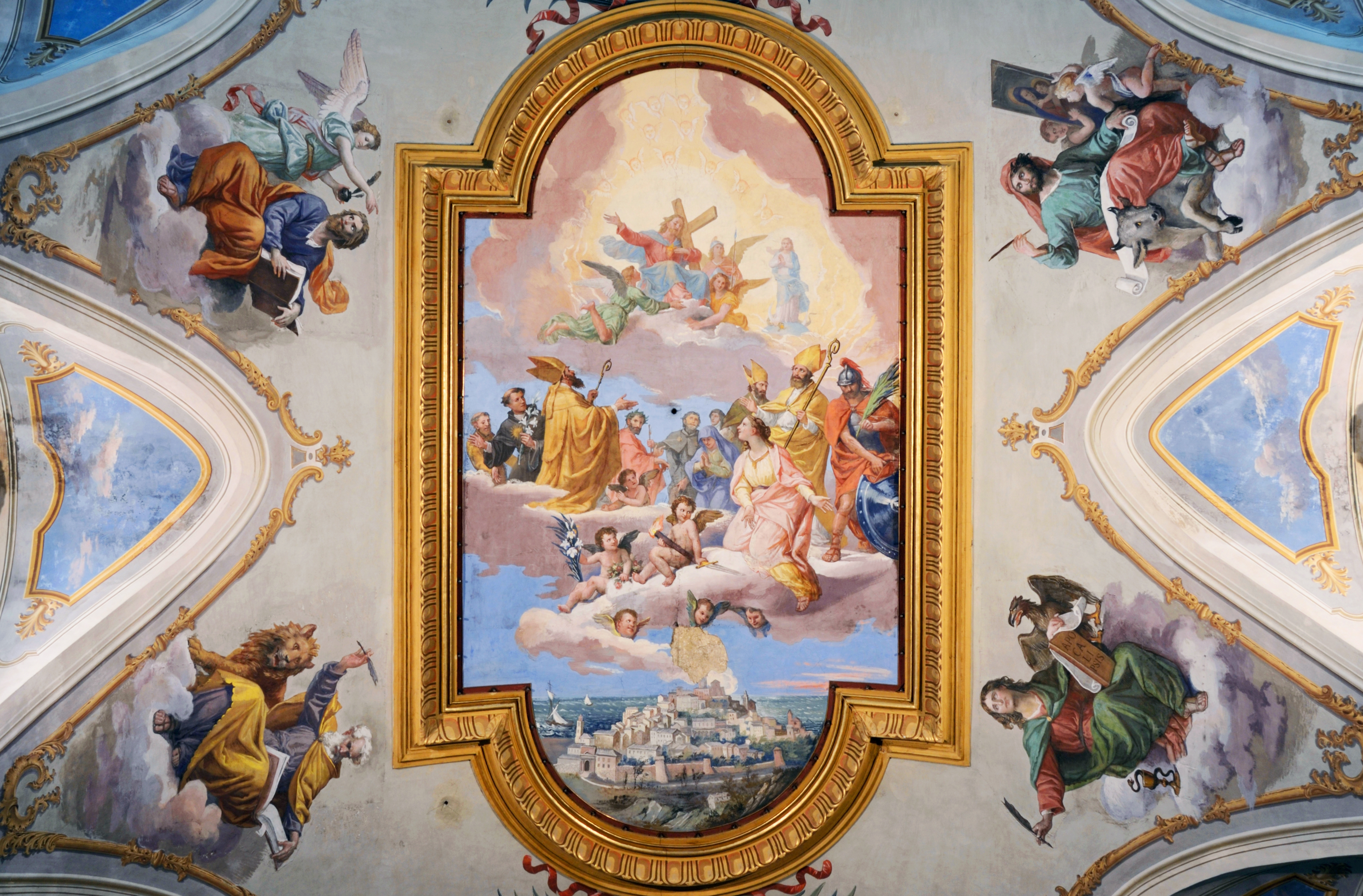
Baroque ceiling fresco of saints and angels above the city, cathedral of Amelia

The cathedral was erected in 872. A major fire in 1629 destroyed the earlier structure, after which it was rebuilt in Baroque forms. The façade, completed in the 19th century, is constructed of pinkish brick.

The interior contains paintings by Federico Zuccari, Giovanni Francesco Perini, and Niccolò Pomarancio. A gabled panel painting of the Sienese school was long attributed to Duccio di Buoninsegna and later to a local painter. Another panel depicting the Madonna and Child is attributed to Antoniazzo Romano.

The octagonal Chapel of the Santissimo Sacramento dates to the 16th century and contains a panel attributed to Taddeo Zuccari, as well as marble monuments to the bishops Bartolomeo and Baldo Farrattini, the latter executed by the Orvietan sculptor Ippolito Scalza. The walls are frescoed by Luigi Fontana. The cathedral also contains sculptures by Agostino di Duccio, Ippolito Scalza and Dosio. The baptismal font is in Renaissance style and includes a small marble statue of Saint John the Baptist associated with the school of Donatello. Beneath the altar are preserved the bodies of the patron saints of Amelia, Saint Fermina and Saint Olympias.

On the wall to the left of the altar is displayed a copy of the Croce dell’Evangelizzazione, originally blessed and raised in 1514 by Bishop Alessandro Geraldini, the first bishop to arrive on the island of Hispaniola. Two organs are preserved in the cathedral: a large instrument built in 1904 by Rieger Orgelbau within an 18th‑century case in the presbytery, and a 17th‑century wing organ that has been restored.

The bell tower was erected in 1050 and incorporates various ancient sculptures reused as building material. The middle bell dates to the time of Henry III. Beneath the tower run very ancient underground passages extending eastward from north to south and branching in various places into large chambers; toward the south they emerge about 0.5 kilometres (0.31 mi) outside the city.

=== San Francesco ===
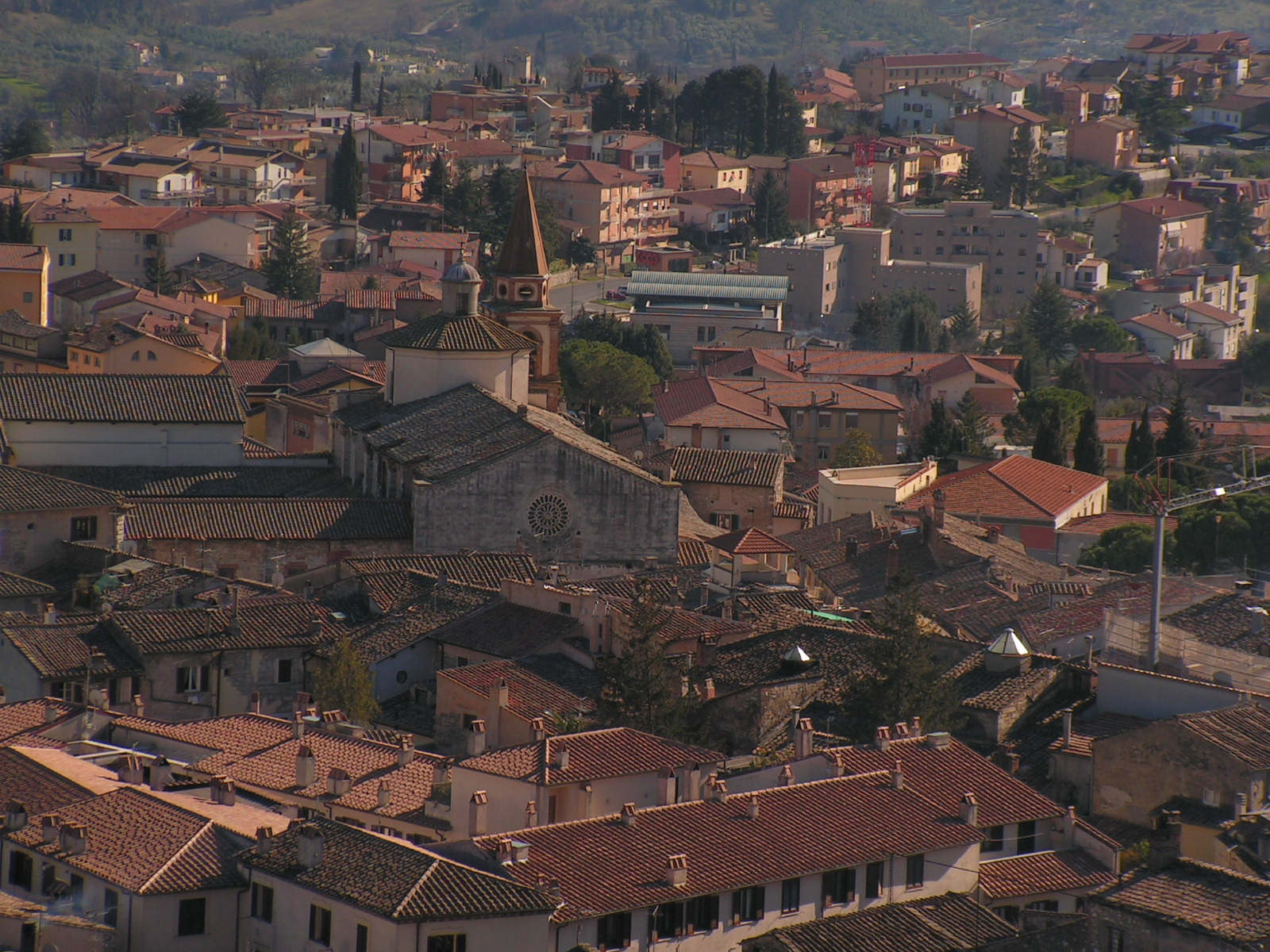
Historic center of Amelia with the church of San Francesco at the center

The church of San Francesco was founded in 1287 by Friar Bartolomeo da Amelia and was originally dedicated to Saints Philip and James. Construction work between 1401 and 1406 was carried out by Umbrian craftsmen, including Menucci of Amelia and Giovanni di Nicola of Castel dell'Aquila. In 1447 the bell tower was built by the Lombard masters Francesco and Guglielmo.

The church underwent modifications between the 16th and 17th centuries to construct the choir loft and to alter the lighting of the apse and nave. Further reconstruction took place in the 18th century, when the windows were raised above the original roofline. In 1942 the building was altered by the Salesians, when the convent was converted into a boarding school.

The exterior retains Late Romanesque forms with Gothic influences, particularly along the sides and the apse wall. The façade, built of travertine blocks, dates to 1401 and is divided by a dentilled cornice. The upper section contains a double concentric rose window and a decorative band of lobed arches forming the gable. The portal incorporates elements inserted during later modifications. The bell tower collapsed in the 1915 earthquake and was rebuilt in 1932.

The interior has a Latin cross plan and was restructured in 1767. On the right side is the Chapel of Saint Anthony, attributed to the Lombard Antonio Pini, which preserves its 15th‑century appearance. The church contains six tombs of the Geraldini family, including the monument of Matteo and Elisabetta created by Agostino di Duccio in 1477. Above the entrance is an 18th‑century organ façade; the original mechanism was replaced in the 1950s. A portion of a medieval fresco has been uncovered near the staircase leading to the choir loft.

=== Santi Filippo e Giacomo ===
The church of Santi Filippo e Giacomo was built in 1287. From the original structure remain the façade, part of the side walls, the doorway and the circular window, while the rest was remodeled in 1767. The interior has vaults and an apse decorated with frescoes by the Perugian painter Monotti.

At the first altar on the left is a painting of the Birth of Mary from the Aretine school of the 16th century. At the first altar on the right is a tempera panel representing Mary with Jesus in a manner recalling Taddeo Bartoli, dating to the 16th century. The chapel of Sant'Antonio contains three monuments of the Geraldini family, two from the 15th century and one from the 16th century.

=== San Pancrazio ===
The church of San Pancrazio dates to the 14th century. The entrance is large and decorated with bas‑reliefs, above which opens a large window. In the niche above is a fresco of the Virgin with Jesus and saints from the Sienese school. An inscription in the pediment records a restoration carried out in 1477.

The interior was completely modernized in 1747. On the left wall at the first altar is a painting of the Trinity surrounded by saints from the school of the Cavalier d'Arpino. At the third altar is a Deposition from the Cross by a pupil of Daniele da Volterra. The fresco of Saint Augustine in the center of the nave was painted by Appiani, who also executed the frescoes of the dome and the apse. In the sacristy remain fragments of a large marble sculpture representing the Nativity, dating to the 15th century.

=== Santa Maria Annunziata ===
About 5 kilometres (3.1 mi) southwest of Amelia stands the church of Santa Maria Annunziata. Its foundation dates to 1440, as recorded by an inscription in the cloister. The high altar contains an oil painting of the Annunciation recalling the manner of Orazio Alfani. In the choir are two sketches believed to represent the Assumption and the Visitation and attributed to Gherardo da Rieti. The church also preserves a finely worked metal processional cross engraved with a burin, dating to the 15th century. Before reaching the convent several remains of Roman buildings are visible, perhaps traces of a villa.

=== San Giovanni Battista ===
The entrance of the church of San Giovanni Battista is richly decorated in stone and dates to 1469. The high altar contains a tempera panel of the Perugian school representing Mary enthroned with Jesus and various saints. At the first altar on the right is a painting of the Marriage of the Virgin recalling the manner of Guido Reni. The sacristy preserves a chased copper processional cross from the 15th century and an illuminated choir book from the 15th century.

=== Santa Elisabetta ===
The altarpiece in the church of Santa Elisabetta shows the Virgin with the Child and saints, a work of the Roman school dated 1667. The ceiling of the church was painted by Pietro Carattoli. The adjoining convent contains an oil painting representing Mary, Jesus and several saints, and another painting of the Roman school also representing the Virgin and saints.

=== Other religious buildings ===
The church of San Giovanni Evangelista was built in 1593 and was significantly enlarged in 1603. On the wall of the high altar is an oil painting representing a miracle of Saint John, attributed to Circignani.

The entrance portal of the church of San Marino is an architectural work of the 16th century. The altarpiece representing the Death of Saint Benedict is said to be a painting of notable quality.

The chapel of San Tommaso has a terracotta façade. In the first chamber on the left remains a fragment of a fresco recalling the manner of Nicola da Siena.

At the altar of the church of the Misericordia on the left is a painting of the Virgin enthroned with Jesus and angels from the Sienese school. On the wall opposite the entrance hangs a painting representing the Baptism and preaching of Saint John with the date 1602, belonging to the school of the Zuccari.

The church of Santa Monaca contains a painting from the school of Guido Reni representing the Vision of Saint Rose of Lima and another painting of the Coronation of Mary signed by Bartolomeo Barbiani and dated 1642.

The church of San Giacomo lies 5 kilometres (3.1 mi) northeast of Amelia and preserves two paintings of the Roman school from the 17th century representing the Virgin with Jesus and saints.

The church of Sant'Agostino is counted among the finest churches of the city.

S. Magno is a Benedictine monastery along via Posterola for cloistered nuns. Inside its church is a restored double keyboard organ from 1680.

=== Religious buildings in nearby hamlets ===
The parish church of San Gregorio stands at Foce and is dedicated to its patron Saint Gregory. A popular feast takes place there on 16 January.

The church of Santa Maria delle Grazie stands at Foce and preserves a revered image of the same name regarded as miraculous. The church contains a Baroque altar richly decorated with gold.

The Convent of the Santissima Annunziata, founded by St. Francis' Friars Minor, has a planetarium. The Cistercians established a convent at Foce, the Sanctuary of the Virgin.

== Culture ==
=== Pre‑Roman walls ===
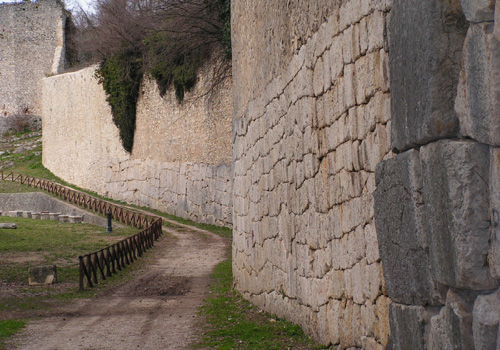
Polygonal masonry walls in Amelia

Amelia is almost entirely encircled by ancient polygonal walls dating between the 6th and 4th centuries BC. The earliest pre‑Roman walls lie within the historic center between the Teatro Sociale and Porta della Valle, marking an earlier perimeter dating to the 7th–6th centuries BC and composed of large limestone blocks.

A second and more external circuit dates to the 4th–3rd centuries BC, following urban expansion and the threat from Rome. This section extends on both sides of Porta Romana for about 800 metres (2,600 ft) and is built of large polygonal megalithic blocks. In the upper portions and other sections of the circuit, the defensive walls date to the late Roman and medieval periods. On the north‑east side is one of the original entrances to the wall circuit, raised above street level and known as Porta del Sole. In the 18th century European travelers attributed the walls to the Pelasgians.

The walls are among the most complete and best preserved constructions of this type. They rest upon a layer of tufa, and where the walls are absent the city was defended by steep and inaccessible cliffs.

Large segments of these were constructed using polygonal masonry of a type defined as "cyclopean", meaning they are characterized by limestone blocks of considerable size (sometimes exceeding 2 metres), cut with great precision in the shape of irregular polygons and then stacked without using mortar. The walls were further fortified and enlarged during Roman times and at various times during the Middle Ages.

=== Roman cisterns ===
The Roman cisterns were constructed between the 2nd and 1st centuries BC when Amelia became a municipium and was provided with new infrastructure including walls, terraces and roads.

The structure consists of a large rectangular space measuring 57.5 metres (189 ft) by 19.6 metres (64 ft), divided into ten parallel chambers covered with barrel vaults and averaging 5.7 metres (19 ft) in height. The chambers were excavated in limestone rock and later lined with masonry in opus incertum. The construction includes a concrete core with a facing of roughly shaped stones. The system preserves elements associated with the functioning of the complex, including water supply channels, a mechanism regulating the maximum water level, and a drainage system.

=== Porta Romana ===
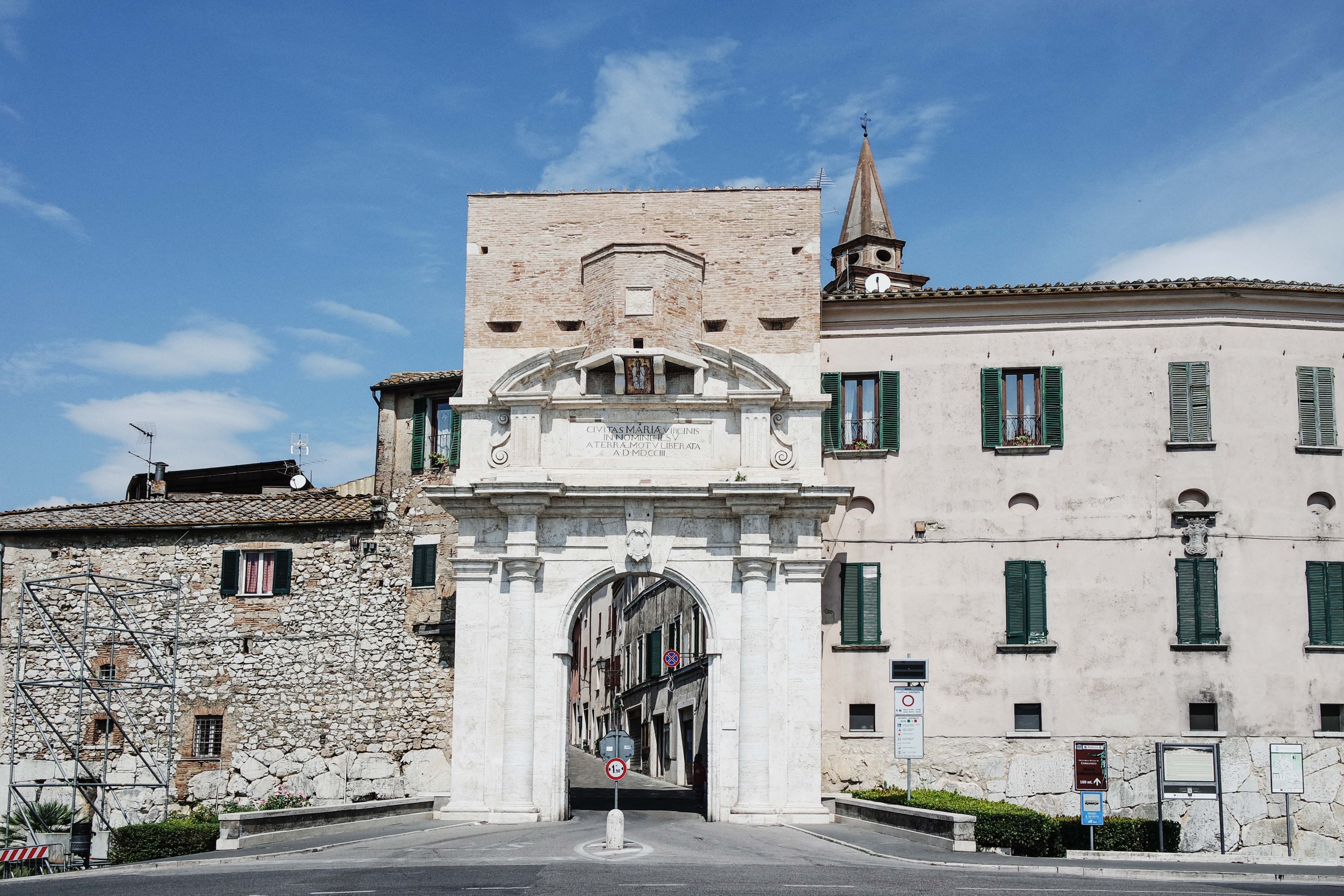
Porta Romana

Porta Romana is the most central of the four gates giving access to the historic center and also the most recent in its present form, which dates to modifications carried out in the 16th century using travertine. In the medieval period the gate was known as Busolina because the ballot box used for elections to the municipal magistracy was kept there.

After the 1703 Apennine earthquakes from which the city emerged unharmed, the inhabitants dedicated Amelia to the Madonna Assunta and placed a commemorative plaque on the gate. The structure is topped by a Renaissance brick machicolation. The original wooden door remains visible on its hinges. The barrel‑vaulted passage displays a fresco bearing the city's coat of arms and the inscription "A.P.C.A." (Antiani Populi Civitatis Ameriae), referring to the governing body of the free municipality established by the statutes of the 14th century.

=== Palazzo Nacci ===
Palazzo Nacci shows several phases of construction. Work began in the 14th century with the incorporation of three earlier buildings and was completed in the following century. The façade is divided by two horizontal stringcourses, one decorated with an egg motif of Roman origin and the other dentilled. On the upper floors are traces of Guelph‑type windows with the coat of arms of the Nacci family carved in relief on the lintels.

The entrance on Via Pellegrino Carleni has a travertine portal decorated with reliefs. The interior courtyard contains a staircase and a loggia supported by Corinthian columns. The palace is privately owned.

=== Palazzo Petrignani ===
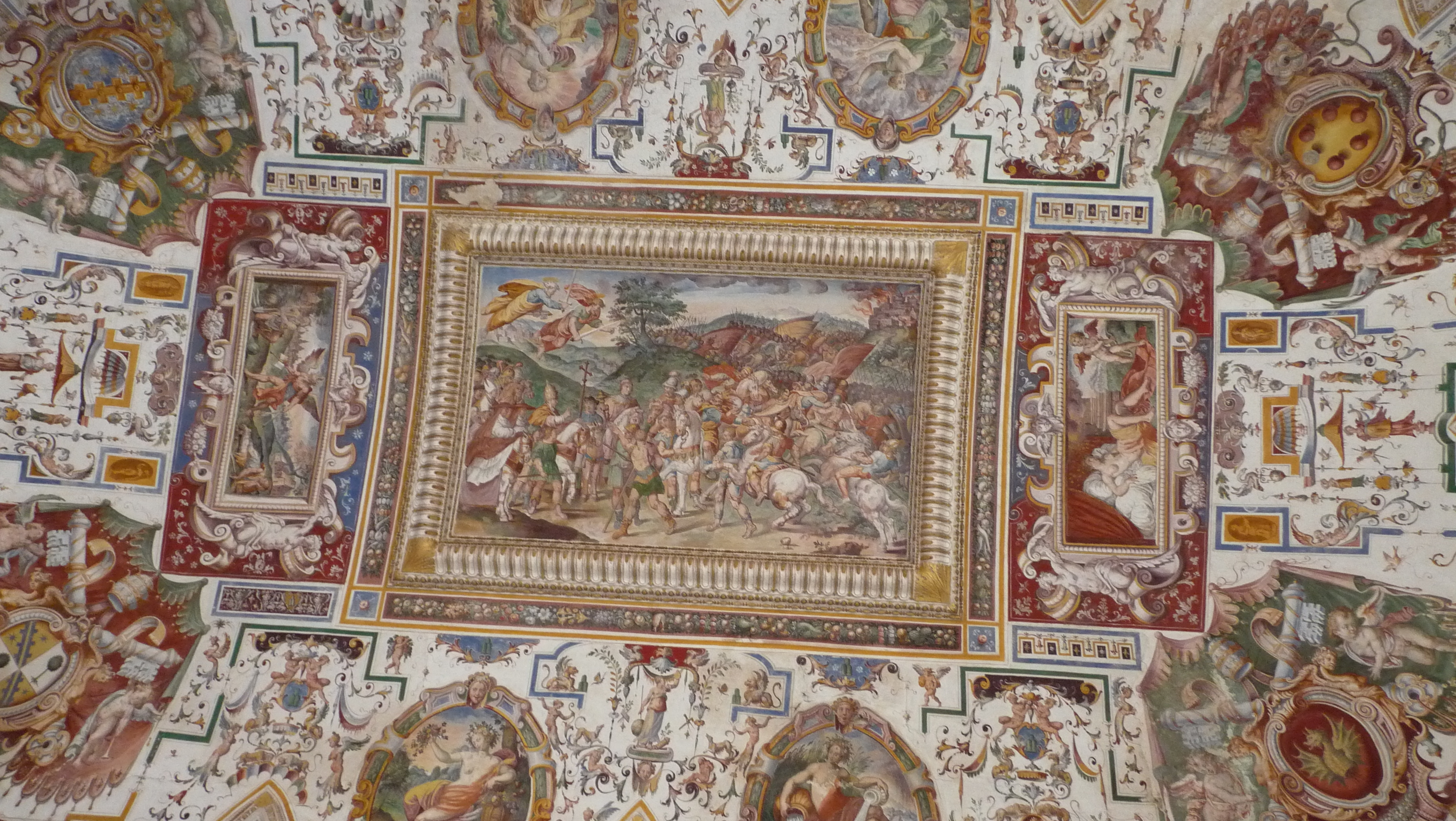
Meeting of Leo I and Attila, central panel of the barrel vault, Palazzo Petrignani

Palazzo Petrignani was constructed in the 16th century in Renaissance style. The building, which remained incomplete, was commissioned by Fantino Petrignani, who advanced within the Papal Curia under the protection of Pope Gregory XIII. The history of the palace is connected with members of the Petrignani family, particularly Fantino and Bartolomeo.

The façade facing the ancient Platea Major is built in brick and organized on four horizontal levels with five vertical rows of windows. A large central portal forms the main entrance. The entrance remained unfinished because the principal staircase to the upper floors was never built. The portal is framed in travertine, where the coat of arms of Bartolomeo Petrignani was once placed before being removed in the early 20th century. The corners of the building are marked by travertine rustication extending from the ground to the roof.

The interior decoration of the rooms reflects successive phases of painting by different artists and has been attributed mainly to the school of Taddeo and Federico Zuccari. Other attributions include Livio Agresti and his pupil Litardo Piccioli, as well as Flemish painters responsible for the grotesque decorations in the palace rooms.

=== Archaeological museum ===
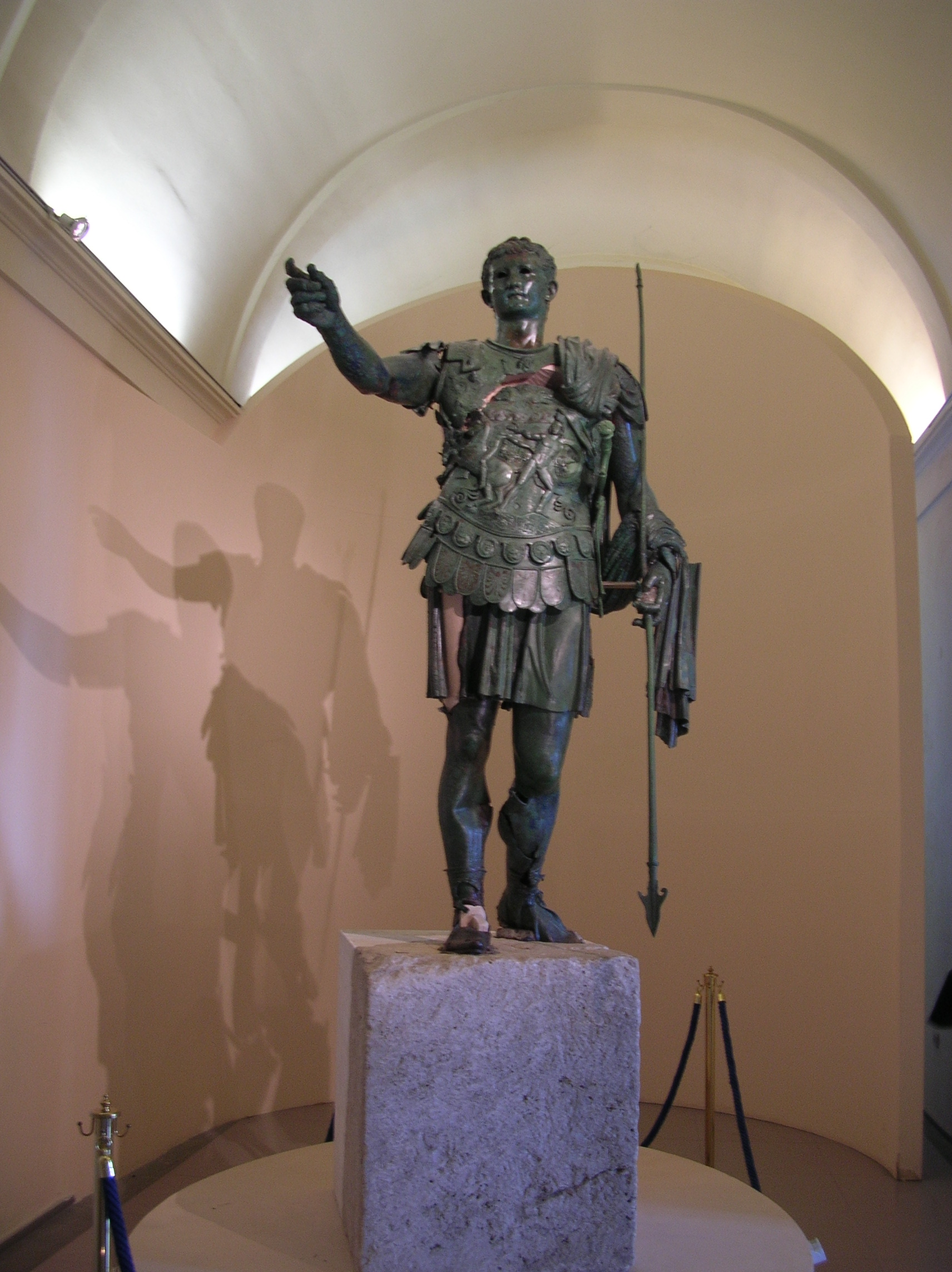
Statue of Germanicus on display at Museo civico di Amelia

The archaeological museum is housed in the former Collegio Boccarini, originally a Franciscan convent of the 13th–14th centuries with a double‑loggia cloister built in the 16th century. The collections are arranged over three floors and present archaeological and historical material from the surrounding territory.

The archaeological section includes finds mainly from local excavations and documents the history of Amelia from the pre‑Roman period through Romanization and into the early Middle Ages. Numerous inscriptions record members of local families, including the Roscia gens.

Among the objects preserved is the Statue of Germanicus, a bronze statue of the Roman general standing more than 2.15 metres (7 ft 1 in) high and wearing a decorated cuirass. The statue was unearthed just outside the Porta Romana in 1963.

The picture gallery on the second floor preserves works from churches and palaces of the city, including a panel depicting Saint Anthony Abbot by Pier Matteo d'Amelia and paintings dating between the 16th and 17th centuries.

=== Pantanelli necropolis ===
Pantanelli, southwest of the town, has a pre-Roman necropolis with a sacred area. The site was in use until between the 4th and 2nd centuries BC. The types of tombs and the quality of the finds suggest control of the area by an elite group. High status goods were placed in the graves, showing social differences within the community.

The finds also reflect trade links, especially through Volsinii, which played a role in bringing Attic pottery into the local market. The Tiber river and its landing points, together with the Tiber valley, were key routes for the movement of goods.

=== Other cultural heritage ===
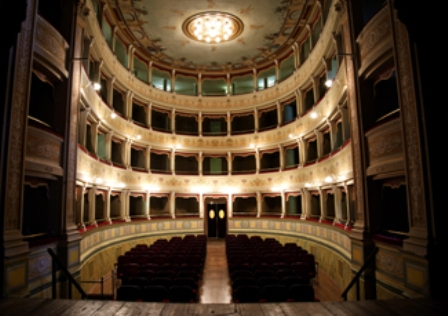
18th-century theater in Amelia

The municipal palace preserves in its principal hall a painting of Christ crucified flanked by two saints, signed by Livio Agresti and dated 1557.

Palazzo Farrattini was designed by Antonio da Sangallo and contains two Roman mosaics.

Remains of Roman reticulated masonry survive in Via di Muro Frollo. Additional remains of reticulated work and two pillar fragments are located in Via Pomponia. In Via Porcelli a structural core remains with attachments indicating the distribution of several rooms, perhaps intended for thermal use. Mosaic remains are preserved in various places within and outside the town.

The Teatro Operino is an opera house built in the eighteenth century and features frescos by nineteenth-century artist Domenico Bruschi.

The thirty-meter-high Torre Civica (Civic Tower) is located in the center of the city.

== Notable people ==
Among the notable individuals associated with Amelia were the ancient Roman Sextus Roscius, a politician and large estate owner whose trial was famously defended by Cicero.

Religious figures from Amelia include Giovanni da Amelia, Catholic priest and bishop; Angelo Geraldini, diplomat and bishop; Alessandro Geraldini, bishop and the first bishop in the Americas; Bartolomeo Ferratini, Catholic priest and cardinal; Fantino Petrignani, archbishop; and Luigi Vannicelli Casoni, archbishop and cardinal.

Artists and writers include Piermatteo d'Amelia, Renaissance painter; Antonio Geraldini, poet and diplomat; Elio Scardamaglia, screenwriter and film director; Valter Vincenti, musician; Caterina Venturini, actress and screenwriter; and Zenone Mattei, composer.

Public figures and scholars include Battista Geraldino d'Amelia, politician; Augusto Vera, philosopher and politician; Tito Sinibaldi, lawyer and politician; and Pietro Alessandro Giustini, physicist and philosopher.

Sportspeople include Luca Pellegrini, swimmer; and Gianluca Giovannini, footballer.

In the 19th century, the prominent families of the city included the Colonna, Panselli, Ferrattini, Geraldini, Canzacchi, Patrignani, and Vannicelli.

== Twin towns ==
- Civitavecchia, Italy, since 1995
- Joigny, France, since 2005
- Stylida, Greece, since 2002
