= Angelo Geraldini =

Roman Catholic bishop

Count Angelo Geraldini (1422–1486) was an Italian humanist and diplomat, who became a bishop.

He studied canon law at the University of Perugia, and was professor there 1444–46. In the papal curia he was appointed count palatine by Pope Callistus III in 1455.

He served under Niccolò Fortiguerra in the papal forces fighting Sigismondo Pandolfo Malatesta, and against Ferrante.

He was legal adviser to Cardinal Domenico Capranica. In France he governed the Venaissin, at two periods. He went on missions to the Council of Basel in 1482, and to the court of John II of Aragon, leading to a Spanish ministerial appointment and close involvement in the marriage of the Catholic Monarchs.

He was bishop of Sessa Aurunca in 1465 and bishop of Kammin, from 1482 to 1485.

== Bibliography ==
- Jürgen Petersohn (1985), Ein Diplomat des Quattrocento: Angelo Geraldini (1422-1486)
- Jürgen Petersohn (editor) (1987), Diplomatische Berichte und Denkschriften des Päpstlichen Legaten Angelo Geraldini aus der Zeit seiner Basel-Legation (1482-1483)
