= San Francesco, Amelia =

San Francesco
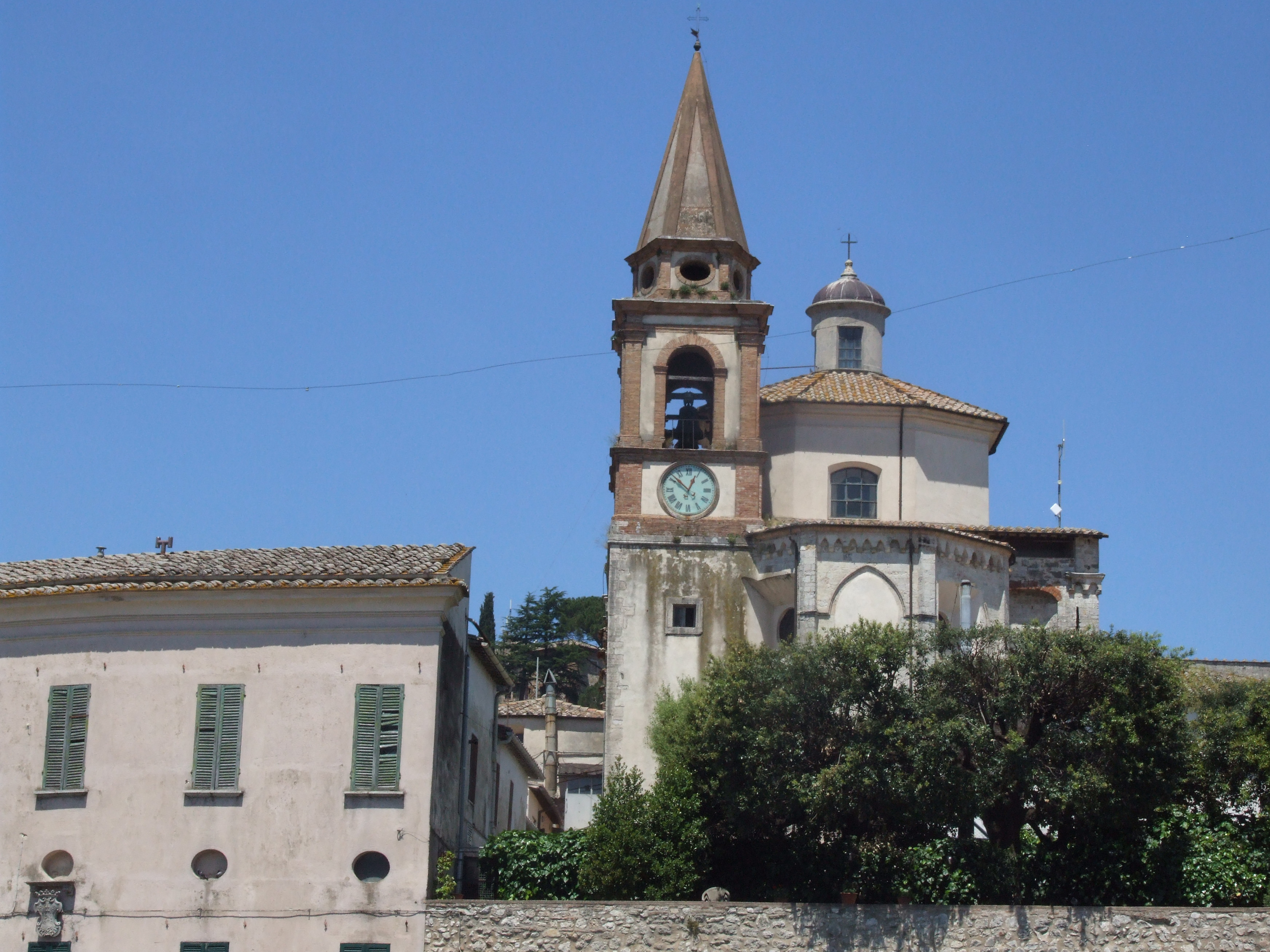
- San Francesco
- Location: Amelia, Province of Terni. Umbria

History
- Founded: 1287
- Dedication: Saints Phillip and James; St Francis

Architecture
- Architect(s): Menuccio Menucci of Amelia, Giovanni di Nicola of Castel dell’Aquila, and Santo di Domenico di Carignoli of Todi
- Style: Gothic architecture

San Francesco is a gothic-style, church located in the town of Amelia, Province of Terni, region of Umbria, Italy.

The church and adjacent convent were constructed starting in 1287, under the guidance of Fra Bartolomeo, a Franciscan of the Order of Friars Minor Conventual, at the site of a former parish church. Initially, it was dedicated to Saints Phillip and James, but later to St Francis. By 1291, the church is mentioned in a Bull of Pope Nicholas IV as having the power to grant indulgences during a period of 40 days.

The present facade though was completed in 1401-1406 by the following three: Menuccio Menucci of Amelia, Giovanni di Nicola of Castel dell’Aquila, and Santo di Domenico di Carignoli of Todi. It is hypothesized that stone from an ancient Roman tomb was used as spolia to create the facade stones. The bell-tower was initially erected in 1447, but collapsed during the 1915 earthquake, and only rebuilt in 1932. The interior was refurbished in the mid-1700s in a late-Baroque stye. The single nave leads to a tri-lobed presbytery with a dome. The fresco decoration of the presbytery is attributed to the late 18th-century painter Vincenzo Monotti. On the right of the nave is the Geraldini chapel, dedicated to St Antony of Padua, and commissioned in 1476 by Bishop Giovanni Geraldini. The chapel has a funereal monument to Matteo and Elisabetta Geraldini, (1477) sculpted by Agostino di Duccio. The tomb monument of Geronimo Geraldini (died 1481) is attributed to the studio of Andrea Bregno, while the monument to Angelo Geraldini (1486) is attributed to Luigi Capponi, a pupil of Bregno. the wooden choir stalls date to 1411.
