= Susan Reynolds =

British medieval historian (1929–2021)

- Born: January 27, 1929; London
- Died: July 29, 2021 (aged 92)
- Occupation: Historian
- Notable work: Fiefs and Vassals: the Medieval Evidence Reinterpreted (1994)

Susan Reynolds FBA (27 January 1929 – 29 July 2021) was a British medieval historian whose book Fiefs and Vassals: the Medieval Evidence Reinterpreted (1994) was part of the academic critique on the concept of feudalism as classically portrayed by previous historians such as François-Louis Ganshof and Marc Bloch. Reynolds rejected typical ideas of feudalism and presented a medieval society structured through 'horizontal' groups. According to The Guardian, "Few books have been more intensely discussed by professional medieval historians. Largely as a consequence of this work, the word 'feudalism', or the 'F-word', as it came to be called by historians, began to lose currency among British medievalists." Reynolds did not only write books that have changed the way we think about the past, but was also someone who was constantly examining her own ideas and whose interests were extraordinarily wide-ranging.

== Life ==
Reynolds was born in London on 27 January 1929. Her father, Hugh Reynolds, was a solicitor. She attended Howell's School, a private girls' school in Denbigh, Wales. She took a first degree at Lady Margaret Hall (LMH), at the University of Oxford. Her first job was as an archivist at the Middlesex County Record Office. A year later she joined the Victoria County History (VHC) as an editor, remaining there for seven years and taking a diploma in archival administration. In a 2008 interview for the Institute of Historical Research, Reynolds said that she only had a bachelor's degree and had never gained either an MA or a PhD in history, explaining, "between the archive training and the VCH, that was really the equivalent of my PhD, it was my training."

She taught at girls' schools from before 1960 to 1964, when she was unexpectedly offered a fellowship at her old college, Lady Margaret Hall. She took early retirement from LMH in 1986, after which the Institute of Historical Research, the British Library in London, and other libraries became the places where she worked regularly. After a year teaching at Dartmouth College in New Hampshire, she lived in London, with summers mostly spent in France. She continued to research and was involved with the Institute of Historical Research.

Reynolds believed that the technical terms used in documents prior to around 1100 did not necessarily hold the meanings ascribed to them by historians who had preceded her; and that clerks of later periods tended to read into earlier documents meanings and relationships current in their own day. In her view, direct ownership of land was more prevalent in the early Middle Ages than had been thought, and the decline of central authority had been exaggerated.

She was elected to the British Academy in 1993. She was an emeritus Fellow of LMH.

She died on 29 July 2021 at age 92.

== Books ==
- Introduction to the History of English Medieval Towns, Clarendon Press, 1977.
- Kingdoms and Communities in Western Europe 900-1300, Clarendon Press, 1984.
- Fiefs and Vassals: The Medieval Evidence Reinterpreted, Clarendon Press, 1994.
- Ideas and Solidarities of the Medieval Laity: England and Western Europe, Routledge, 1995.
- Before Eminent Domain: Toward a History of Expropriation of Land for the Common Good, University of North Carolina Press, 2010.
