= List of bishops of Szczecin-Kamień =

Bishops of the Roman Catholic Archdiocese of Szczecin-Kamień:

== Diocesan bishops of Szczecin-Kamień diocese (1972–1992) ==
- 1972–1978 – Jerzy Stroba
- 1978–1992 – Kazimierz Majdański

== Metropolitan archbishop of Szczecin-Kamień diocese (from 1992) ==
- 1992–1999 – Marian Przykucki
- 1999–2009 – Zygmunt Kamiński
- 2009–2024 – Andrzej Dzięga
- 2024–present – Wiesław Śmigiel

== Suffragan bishop of Szczecin-Kamień diocese ==
- 1974–1992 – Jan Gałecki
- 1980–1992 – Stanisław Stefanek
- 1989–1992 – Marian Błażej Kruszyłowicz

== Suffragan bishop of Szczecin-Kamień archdiocese ==
- 1992–2007 – Jan Gałecki
- 1992–1996 – Stanisław Stefanek
- 1992–2013 – Marian Błażej Kruszyłowicz
- since 2014 – Henryk Wejman

== See also ==
- Previous Catholic dioceses in Pomerania:
  - Diocese of Kołobrzeg (Kolberg, 1000–1005), bishop Reinbern
  - Bishopric of Cammin (1140–1650)
- Pomeranian Evangelical Church
