= Piccinino =

Piccinino is an Italian surname. Notable people with the surname include:

- Bianca Maria Piccinino (1924–2025), Italian journalist and television hostess
- Francesco Piccinino (c. 1407 – 1449), Italian condottiero
- Jacopo Piccinino (1423–1465), Italian condottiero and nobleman
- Niccolò Piccinino (1386–1444), Italian condottiero
