= Marian Błażej Kruszyłowicz =

Polish Roman Catholic prelate (1936–2025)

His Excellency Marian Błażej Kruszyłowicz
- Auxiliary Bishop Emeritus of Szczecin-Kamień
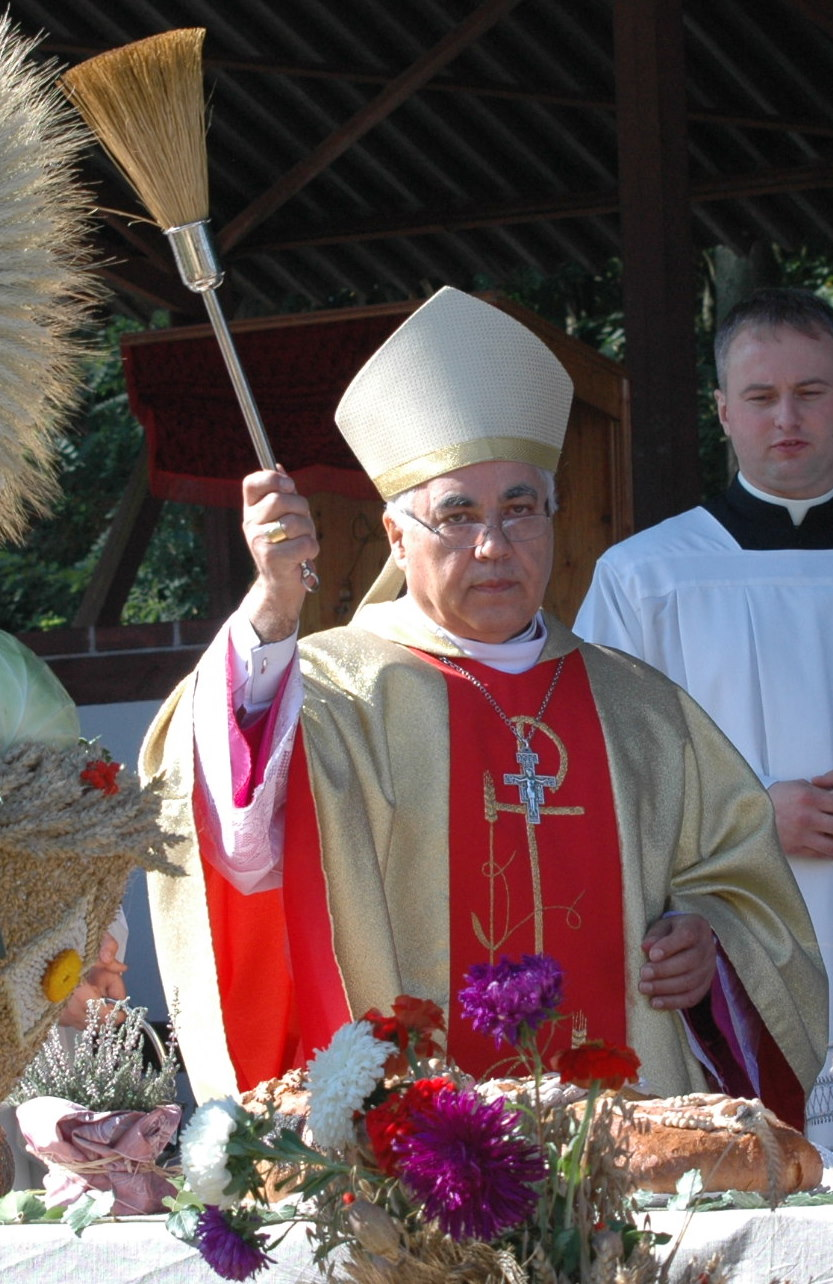
- Archdiocese: Szczecin-Kamień
- Appointed: 9 December 1989
- Term ended: 11 May 2013
- Other post: Titular Bishop of Hadrumetum (1989–2025)

Orders
- Ordination: 7 February 1960 by Jan-Wawrzyniec Kulik
- Consecration: 6 January 1990 by Pope John Paul II

Personal details
- Born: 6 May 1936 Gliniszcze, Poland
- Died: 13 August 2025 (aged 89)

Marian Błażej Kruszyłowicz (6 May 1936 – 13 August 2025) was a Polish Roman Catholic prelate.

== Life and work ==
Kruszyłowicz was born in Gliniszcze near Vawkavysk on 6 May 1936. He studied at the Franciscan Fathers' Small Seminary in Niepokalanów. Due to the difficulties set by the communist authorities, he obtained his state baccalaureate in 1958. In 1952, he was admitted to the Franciscan monastery in Łagiewniki. He received the monastic name Błażej. On 31 August 1953, at the end of his one-year novitiate, he made his first religious vows and was assigned to the Province of Our Lady of the Immaculate in Warsaw. He made his perpetual vows on 8 December 1957 in the hands of Provincial Anselm Kubit.

From 1954–60, he attended a seminary course in Christian philosophy and theology in the religious seminaries in Łódź-Łagiewniki and in Kraków. In 1959, he began his studies in moral theology with a specialization in moral theology of the Orthodox Church and the ecumenical movement at the Faculty of Theology of the Catholic University of Lublin. He was ordained a priest on 7 February 1960 in the Łagiewniki monastery by the auxiliary bishop of Łódź, Jan Kulik.

He worked as a catechist in secondary schools in Koszalin. In the Provincial Franciscan Order, he served as treasurer, definitor and vicar. From 1971–78, he was the guardian of the Niepokalanów monastery. In the General Curia of the Franciscans in Rome, he served as General Definitor, Vicar General (1978–1989), as well as the duties of General of the Order. During his work in Rome, he was also a member of the Pontifical Commission for Russia, responsible for the care of the Franciscans in the countries of Eastern Europe, where the communist authorities liquidated religious structures. In 1989, he was elected superior of the religious province in Warsaw, as well as president of the Conference of Major Superiors of Men's Religious Orders in Poland.

On 9 December 1989, he was appointed auxiliary bishop of the diocese of Szczecin-Kamień and titular bishop of Hadrumetum. He was ordained a bishop on 6 January 1990 in St. Peter's Basilica. They were administered by Pope John Paul II, assisted by Archbishop Giovanni Battista Re, Substitute for General Affairs of the Secretariat of State, and Archbishop Myroslav Marusin, Secretary of the Congregation for the Oriental Churches. As his episcopal motto, he adopted the words "Obedientia et pax" (Obedience and peace), referring to the Franciscan motto "Pax et Bonum". In Szczecin he served as vicar general. Having reached the age of 75, he submitted his resignation from the bishopric ministry to the pope. On 21 June 2011, Pope Benedict XVI decided to continue it for another two years after reaching retirement age. On 11 May 2013, Pope Francis accepted his resignation.

Kruszyłowicz died on 13 August 2025, at the age of 89.

Catholic Church titles
Preceded by —	Auxiliary Bishop of Szczecin-Kamień; 1989–2013	Succeeded by —
Preceded by Mijo Škvorc	Titular Bishop of Hadrumetum; 1989–2025	Succeeded by Vacant
