= Amelia Cathedral =

Cathedral in Amelia, Italy

Coordinates: 42.5574°N 12.4145°E

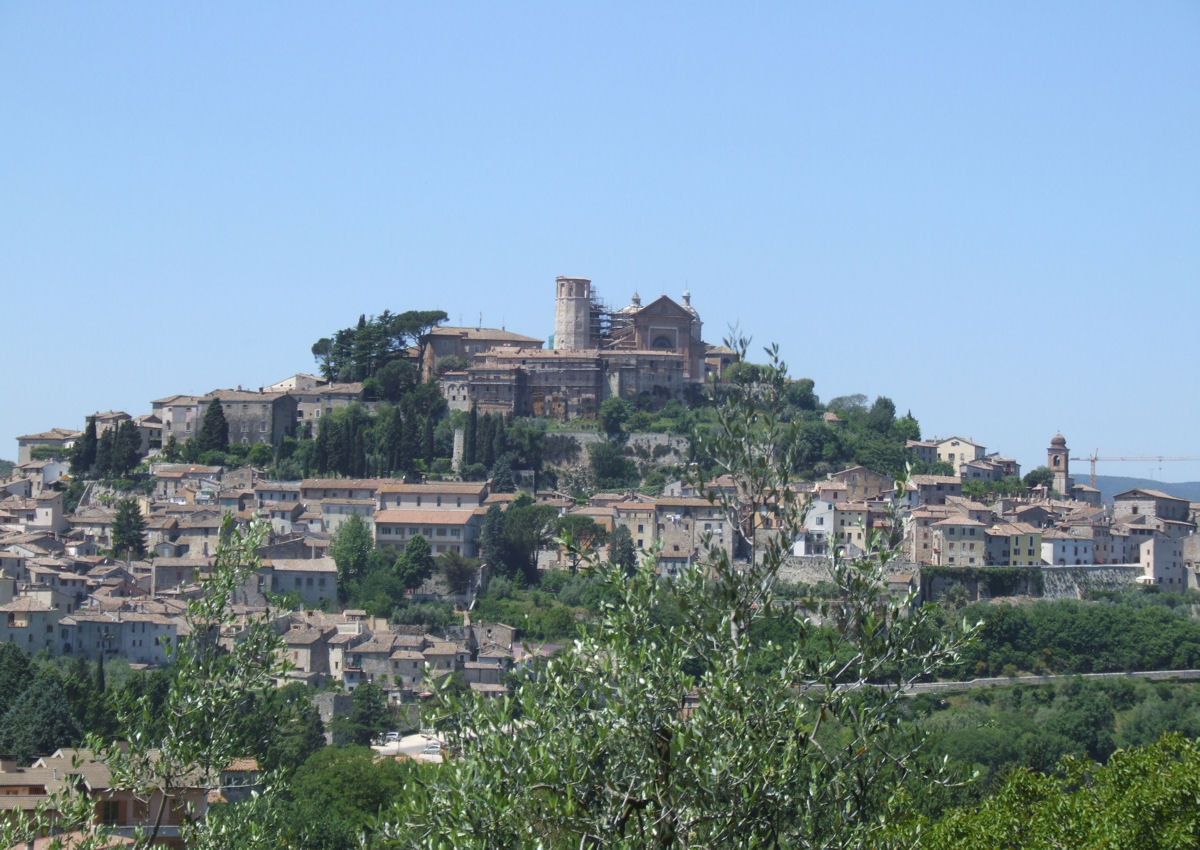
View of Amelia, showing the cathedral with its distinctive campanile at the top of the hill

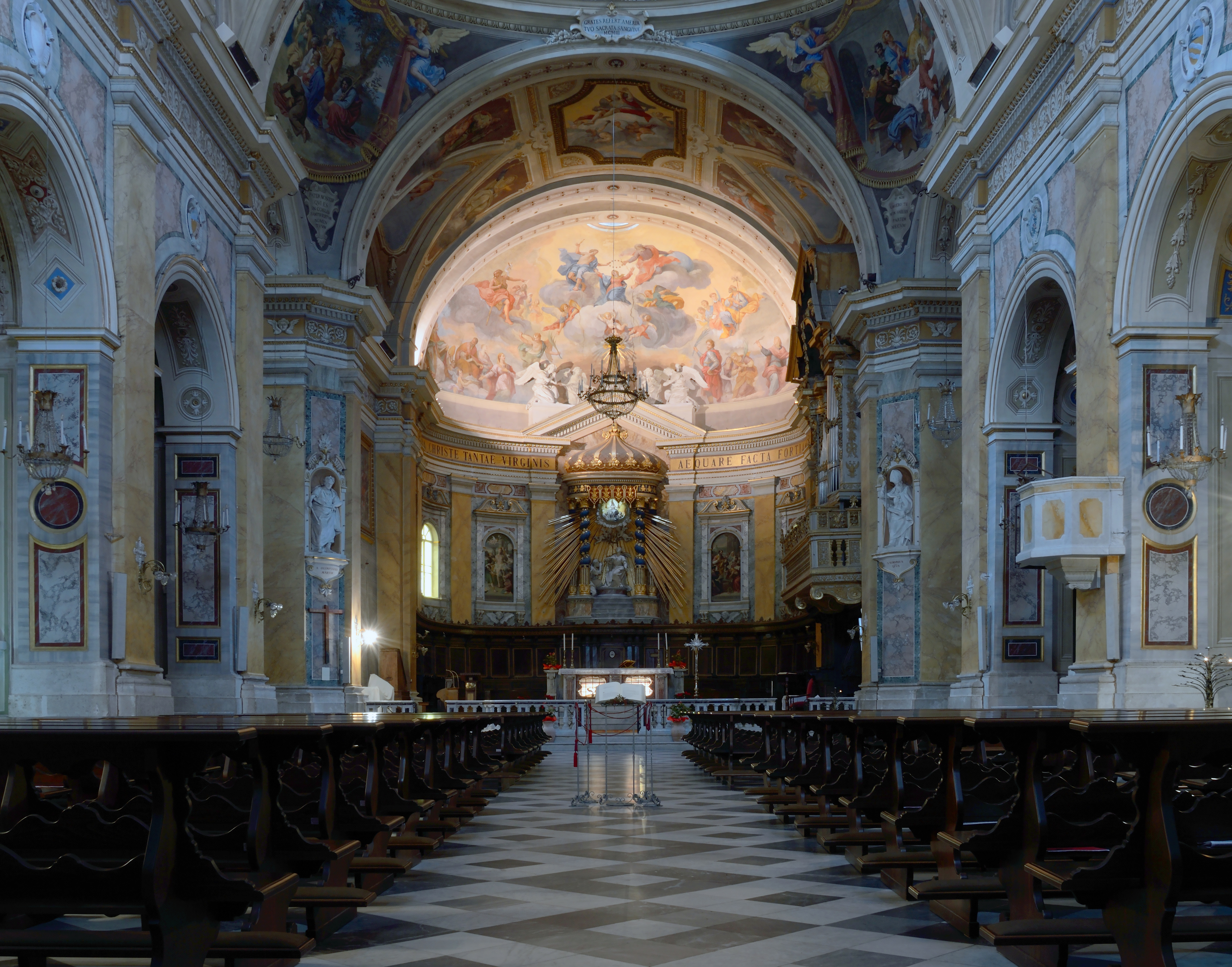
Interior

Amelia Cathedral (Italian: Duomo di Amelia, Cattedrale di Santa Firmina) is a Roman Catholic cathedral in Amelia in the province of Terni, Umbria, Italy. It was formerly the seat of the Bishop of Amelia, in existence from not later than the 5th century, but since 1983 has been a co-cathedral in the Diocese of Terni-Narni-Amelia.

Location of Amelia Cathedral

Amelia Cathedral, dedicated to Saint Firmina, was built originally in 872. That building was destroyed by the troops of Emperor Frederick II in the 13th century, and was rebuilt in Gothic style. That building too was destroyed, by a fire in 1629, and was reconstructed in Baroque form. The present façade of pink cotto was completed only in the 19th century, after a destructive earthquake in 1822.

The cathedral has a Latin cross groundplan and a single nave. The relics of Saints Firmina and Olimpiade, the patron saints of the city, are preserved here. In a side-chapel are two Turkish banners captured at the Battle of Lepanto in 1571.

A number of notable works of art are housed here, including a depiction of the Last Supper (1538) painted by Giovanni Francesco Perini, the tomb of the Geraldini (1476) by Agostino di Duccio, a Madonna and Child attributed to Antoniazzo Romano, the Chapel of the Farattini containing among other items the funerary monument of Baldo Farrattini (bishop of Amelia 1558-62) by Ippolito Scalza, and works by Niccolò Circignani, Federico or Taddeo Zuccari, and a modern copy of the stolen original of a "Martyrdom of Saint Firmina" by Lavinia Fontana. There is also an organ from 1600.

The campanile of the cathedral was erected in 1050 using fragments of Roman buildings.

== Sources and external links ==
- Catholic Encyclopedia: Amelia
- Catholic Hierarchy: Diocese of Amelia
- Description of Amelia Cathedral and contents
