= Ulrich Stutz =

Swiss-German legal historian

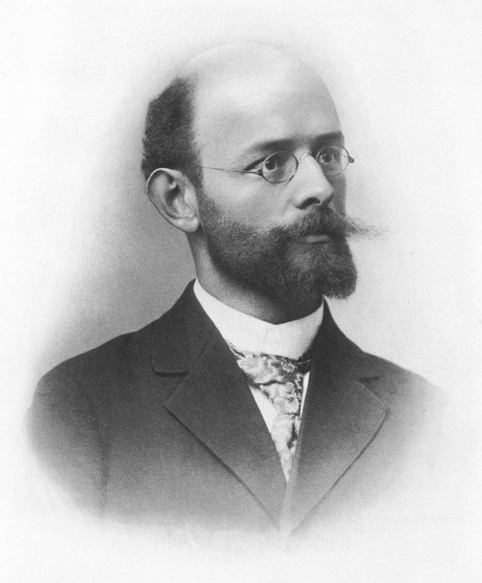

Ulrich Stutz (May 5, 1868, Zürich, Switzerland—July 6, 1938, Berlin, Germany,) was a Swiss-German jurist and historian and pioneering scholar in the academic study of canon law. He is associated in particular with the theory of the proprietary church (Eigenkirche) and its role in the development of Christianity in medieval Europe.

== Education and academic career ==
Stutz was born in Zürich, Switzerland, to an academic family. His father was a secondary school teacher and lecturer in geosciences at the Zürich Polytechnicum. He studied at the local cantonal gymnasium before enrolling in 1887 at the University of Zürich to pursue a law degree. The following year, he transferred to Berlin, where he attended classes taught by some of the greatest luminaries of the period in Germanic law and church history, including Heinrich Brunner, Otto von Gierke, and Adolf von Harnack. He received his doctoral degree from Berlin in 1892 with a dissertation on the administration of ecclesiastical property in post-Roman Western Europe. This work would be published in 1895 as Part 1 of The History of Ecclesiastical Benefices from their Origins to the Time of Alexander III (Geschichte des kirchlichen Benefizialwesens von seinen Anfängen bis auf die Zeit Alexanders III), though a promised second volume never appeared. The impact of this thesis was such that Stutz was offered a lectureship in the faculty of law at the University of Basel in 1893 without having completed the traditional habilitation.

His academic distinction rose rapidly after this, with successive appointments to full professorial chairs in canon law and German legal history at Freiburg (1896), Bonn (1904), and finally Berlin (1917), where he remained for the rest of his career.

While at Bonn, Stutz founded the Institute for Canon Law (Institut für Kirchenrecht, relocated to Berlin when Stutz moved), and inaugurated the "Kanonistiche Abteilung" (Canon Law Section) of the prestigious Savigny-Zeitschrift für Rechtsgeschichte.

Among Stutz's many distinguished students in Berlin were Hans Erich Feine (1890–1965), Klaus Mörsdorf, and Stephan Kuttner (1907–96), who emigrated to the United States and was instrumental in establishing the field of canon law studies there in the post-war period.

Although a conservative German nationalist, Stutz opposed Nazism and took early retirement in 1936 rather than cooperate with the NS Gleichschaltung of the law school faculty. He died two years later, shortly after his 70th birthday.

== Stutz and the institution of the proprietary church ==
Stutz's innovation in studying and teaching canon law, as his student Stephan Kuttner observed, was to separate it from legal dogmatics and presentist viewpoints and treat it as a subject of critical historical investigation in its own right. Although Stutz published voluminously on numerous topics in legal history and church history throughout his career, his most enduring contribution was to theorize the seminal role of the proprietary church, or what he termed the Eigenkirche, in the history of Latin Christendom. Stutz believed that the institution of the private church wherein the family of a church's donor or patron retained a controlling interest over the institution, its endowment, and even the clergy who served it, derived from ancient Germanic customs, particularly that of the pagan household priesthood, and the shrines and temples built by warrior chieftains on their allod lands for themselves and their followers. By contrast, Stutz suggested, Roman law and custom treated religious buildings and institutions as public goods, which led to the emergence of the bishop as the ultimate overseer of ecclesiastical affairs. As Germanic groups settled within the Western Roman Empire and converted to Christianity, however, they brought with them their own, fundamentally different, legal mentality regarding religious property, giving rise to the great conflicts between the church and lay patrons (particularly monarchs) that characterized so much of medieval religious history, including episodes like the Investiture controversy.

At the time, this was seen as a highly innovative and exciting theory that found particular resonance among nationalistically inclined scholars and students in Germany who appreciated the notion that ancient Germanic cultural practices held the key to understanding the development of church law and institutions in the medieval West. Others, notably in France, were far more skeptical.

The Stutzian theory of the Eigenkirche, and in particular its use as an explanatory paradigm for early medieval religious politics, has come under renewed scrutiny in the 21st century. Susan Wood's landmark 2006 book, for example, undertook a broad revision of Stutz's arguments, showing that proprietary control of churches was hardly a geographically uniform or historically consistent custom, nor a coherent "system", and that while property interests in lower churches and monasteries certainly existed (by bishops as well as laymen), its application to "higher" churches, or whole bishoprics, is not tenable.
