= Stroncone (disambiguation) =

Stroncone is a town in Umbria, Italy. Stroncone may also refer to:

- Santa Lucia Stroncone Astronomical Observatory, an observatory in Stroncone
- 5609 Stroncone (1993 FU), a main-belt asteroid discovered from the observatory
