= Santi Pietro e Cesareo =

Church in Guardea, Italy

Coordinates: 42°37′26″N 12°17′48″E

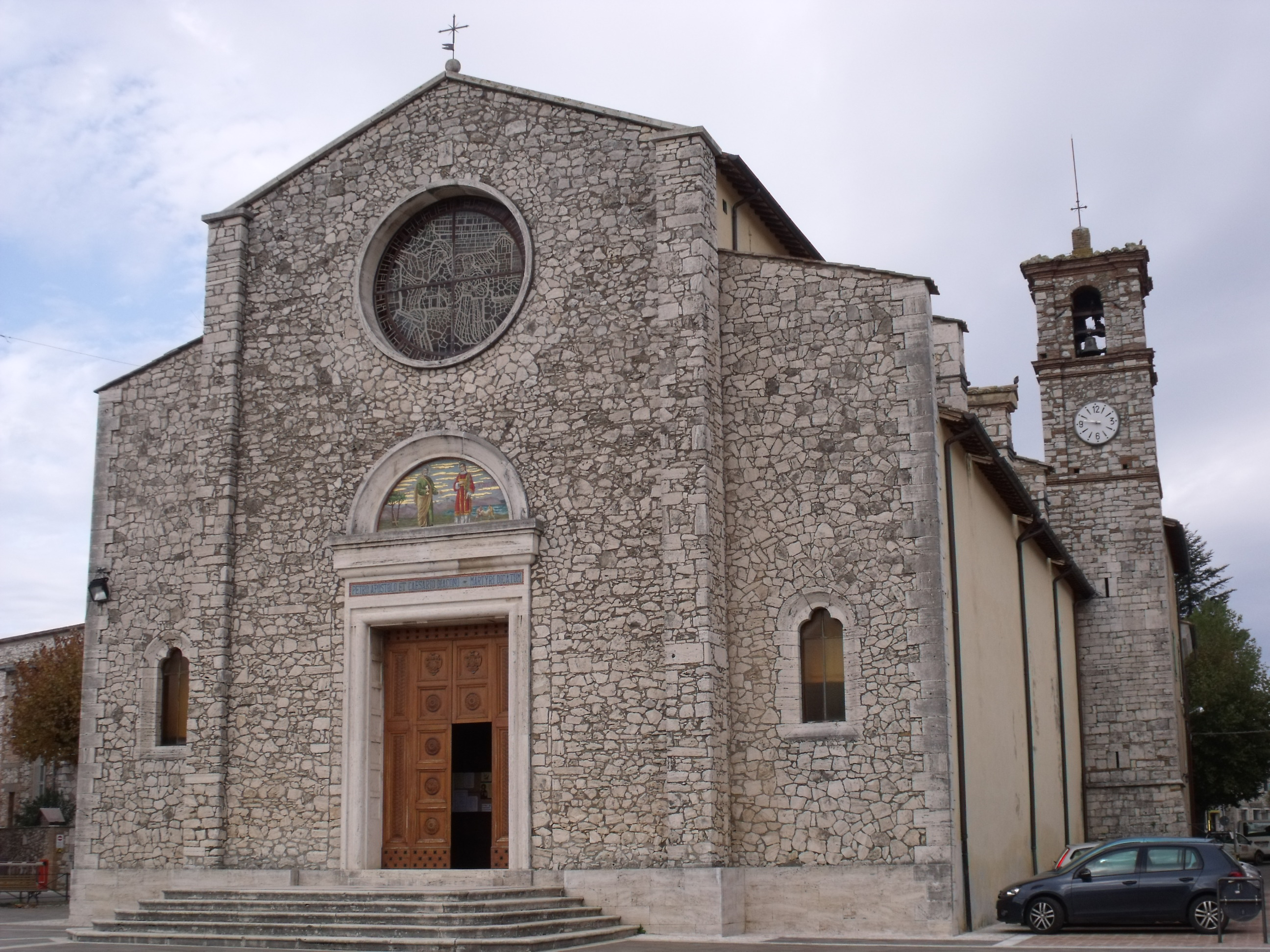
The church of Pietro e Cesareo

Santi Pietro e Cesareo is a Roman Catholic church located in the town of Guardea in the province of Terni, region of Umbria, Italy.

== History ==
The parish church is located in Piazza Pietro Panfili. In the early 1700s, this church replaced an earlier structure dedicated to Santa Cecilia. The present church has a single nave with three side chapels. The apse was frescoed in the 19th century by Andrea Galeotti, replicating a design from a church in the neighborhood of Tenaglie (town of Montecchio). Among the canvases in the church is the main altarpiece, depicting a Last Supper, by a follower of Livio Agresti.
