= Sant'Egidio, Guardea =

Church in Guardea, Italy

Coordinates: 42°37′24″N 12°17′52″E

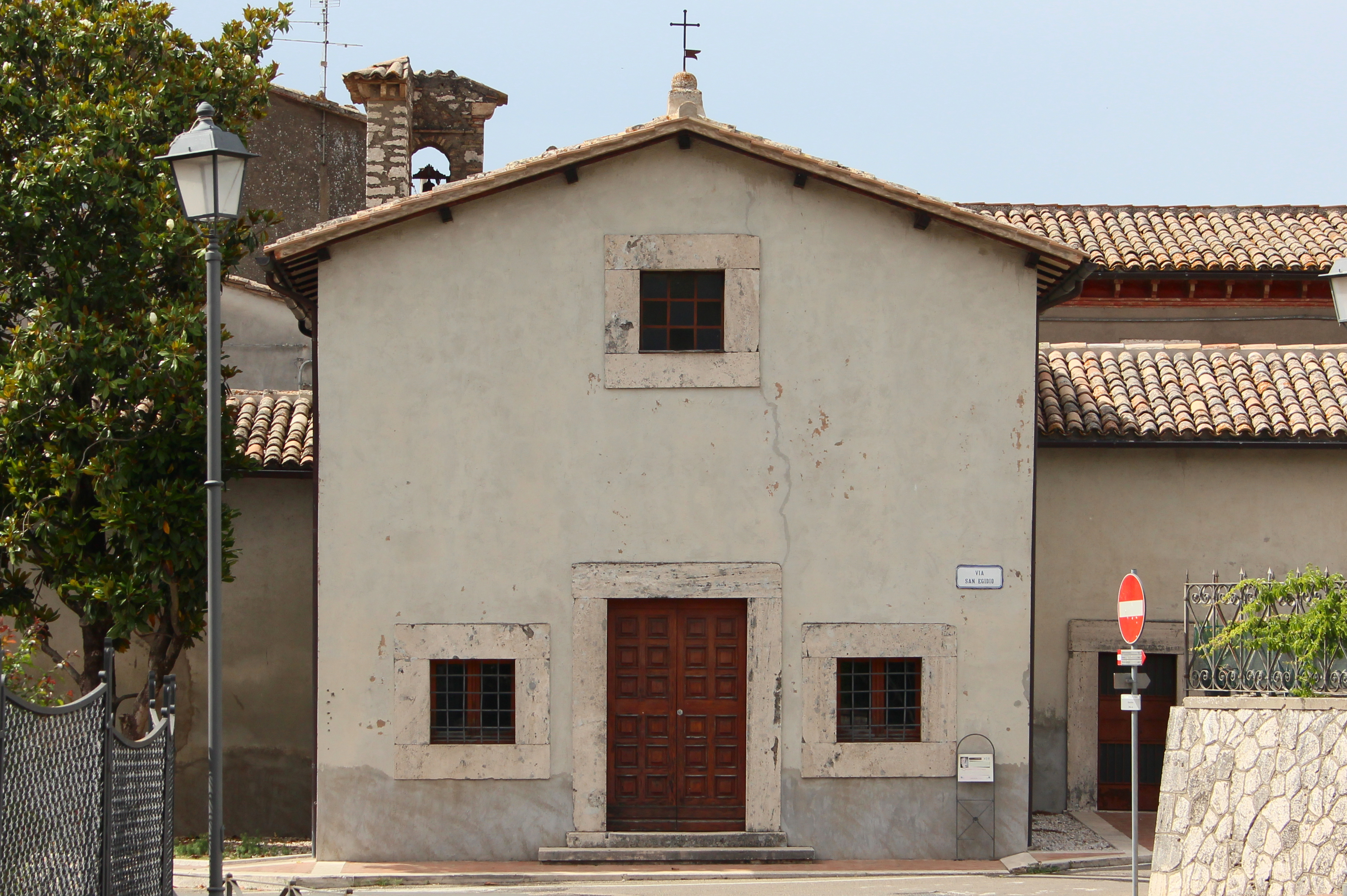
The church of Sant’Egidio

Sant'Egidio is a Roman Catholic church located in the town of Guardea, province of Terni, region of Umbria, Italy.

== History ==
The church is dedicated to the patron of the town. The Gothic mullioned window suggests the church was built in the 13th century. It likely coalesced around an aedicule dedicated to the saint, enlarged over the age. The first enlargement occurred in 1524, circa when the fresco of the Enthroned Madonna with Saints was painted behind the altar. Further enlargement took place in 1690.
