= 7529 Vagnozzi =

Stony asteroid from the inner regions of the asteroid belt

Discovery
- Discovered by: Colleverde Obs.
- Discovery site: Colleverde Obs.
- Discovery date: 16 January 1994

Designations
- Named after: Antonio Vagnozzi (Italian astronomer)
- Alternative designations: 1994 BC · 1969 TK_{5} 1988 PP_{3} · 1997 CE_{7}
- Minor planet category: main-belt · (inner)

Orbital characteristics
- Epoch 4 September 2017 (JD 2458000.5)
- Uncertainty parameter 0
- Observation arc: 47.44 yr (17,328 days)
- Aphelion: 2.7449 AU
- Perihelion: 2.1696 AU
- Semi-major axis: 2.4573 AU
- Eccentricity: 0.1171
- Orbital period (sidereal): 3.85 yr (1,407 days)
- Mean anomaly: 185.61°
- Mean motion: 0° 15^{m} 21.24^{s} / day
- Inclination: 3.7669°
- Longitude of ascending node: 201.22°
- Argument of perihelion: 138.85°

Physical characteristics
- Dimensions: 4.916±0.120 km 5.66 km (calculated)
- Synodic rotation period: 36 h
- Geometric albedo: 0.20 (assumed); 0.291±0.100
- Spectral type: S
- Absolute magnitude (H): 13.5 · 13.59±1.29 · 13.6

7529 Vagnozzi, provisional designation 1994 BC, is a stony asteroid from the inner regions of the asteroid belt, approximately 5 kilometers in diameter. It was discovered on 16 January 1994, by and at the Colleverde Observatory near Rome, Italy. The asteroid was named for was named for Italian amateur astronomer Antonio Vagnozzi.

== Orbit and classification ==
Vagnozzi orbits the Sun in the inner main-belt at a distance of 2.2–2.7 AU once every 3 years and 10 months (1,407 days). Its orbit has an eccentricity of 0.12 and an inclination of 4° with respect to the ecliptic. It was first identified as 1969 TK_{5} at Crimea–Nauchnij in 1969. The first used observation was taken at the Australian Siding Spring Observatory in 1988, extending the asteroid's observation arc by 6 years prior to its official discovery.

== Physical characteristics ==
=== Rotation period ===
In August 2011, a tentative rotational lightcurve for Vagnozzi was obtained from photometric observations by French amateur astronomer René Roy. It gave a slower than average rotation period of 36 hours (1.5 days) with a high brightness variation of 0.740±0.029 in magnitude, indicating a non-spheroidal shape (U=n/a).

=== Diameter and albedo ===
According to the survey carried out by the NEOWISE mission of NASA's Wide-field Infrared Survey Explorer, Vagnozzi measures 4.9 kilometers in diameter and its surface has an albedo of 0.29, while the Collaborative Asteroid Lightcurve Link assumes a standard albedo for stony asteroids of 0.20 and calculates a diameter of 5.7 kilometers with an absolute magnitude of 13.6.

== Naming ==
This minor planet was named in honor of Antonio Vagnozzi (born 1950), an Italian amateur astronomer, discoverer of minor planets, and pioneer in using CCD cameras at the Santa Lucia Stroncone Astronomical Observatory in Italy. He is also an observer and discoverer of supernovae. The official naming citation was published by the Minor Planet Center on 11 April 1998 (M.P.C. 31611).
