= Asprilio Pacelli =

Italian composer

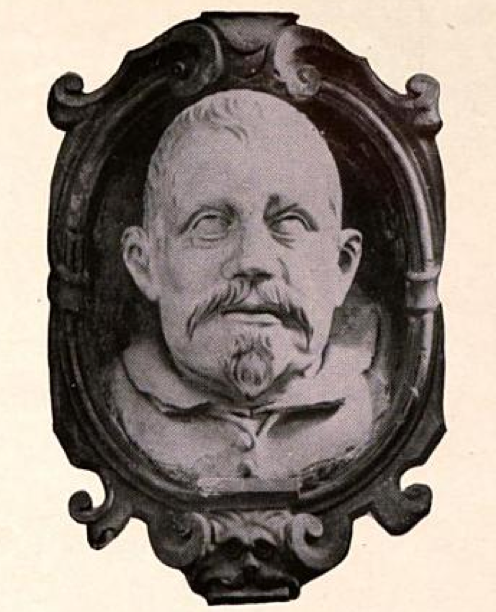
- Monument in Saint John's Archcathedral in Warsaw, Poland
- Born: 1570; Vasciano, Stroncone, Province of Terni, Umbria, Italy
- Died: 4 May 1623 (aged 52–53); Warsaw
- Occupation: Composer
- Style: Baroque

Asprilio Pacelli (or Pecelli) (1570 – 4 May 1623) was an Italian Baroque composer. He was born in Vasciano near Narni in Stroncone, Province of Terni, Umbria, Italy; and died in Warsaw.

== Life ==
He was a boy chorister at Cappella Giulia under Giovanni Pierluigi da Palestrina. He served at two Roman churches: Santa Maria in Monserrato and Santissima Trinità dei Pellegrini. Maestro di cappella of the Collegio Germanico (from 1595), he held the same position at S Pietro from 1602, but he left the post to Francesco Soriano from 1 January 1603; in the same year Pacelli became Maestro di cappella of King Sigismund III of Poland, who had one of the most important royal chapels in Europe. He remained at that position until his death. In appreciation, the King ordered an epitaph commemorating Pacelli to be constructed in the St. John's Cathedral in Warsaw. The original epitaph with the composer's portrait was destroyed when the Cathedral was also destroyed during the Planned destruction of Warsaw; it was nonetheless reconstructed after the war.

== Bibliography ==
- Mirosław Perz, Asprilio Pacelli, in «New Grove Dictionary»;
- Cristina Santarelli, Asprilio Pacelli, in «Dizionario Enciclopedico Universale della Musica e dei Musicisti», Torino, 1985;
- Alberto Cametti, Giovanni Pierluigi da Palestrina, Ed. Ricordi, 1894.
