= Santa Lucia, Guardea =

Church building in Guardea, Italy

Coordinates: 42°37′31″N 12°17′44″E

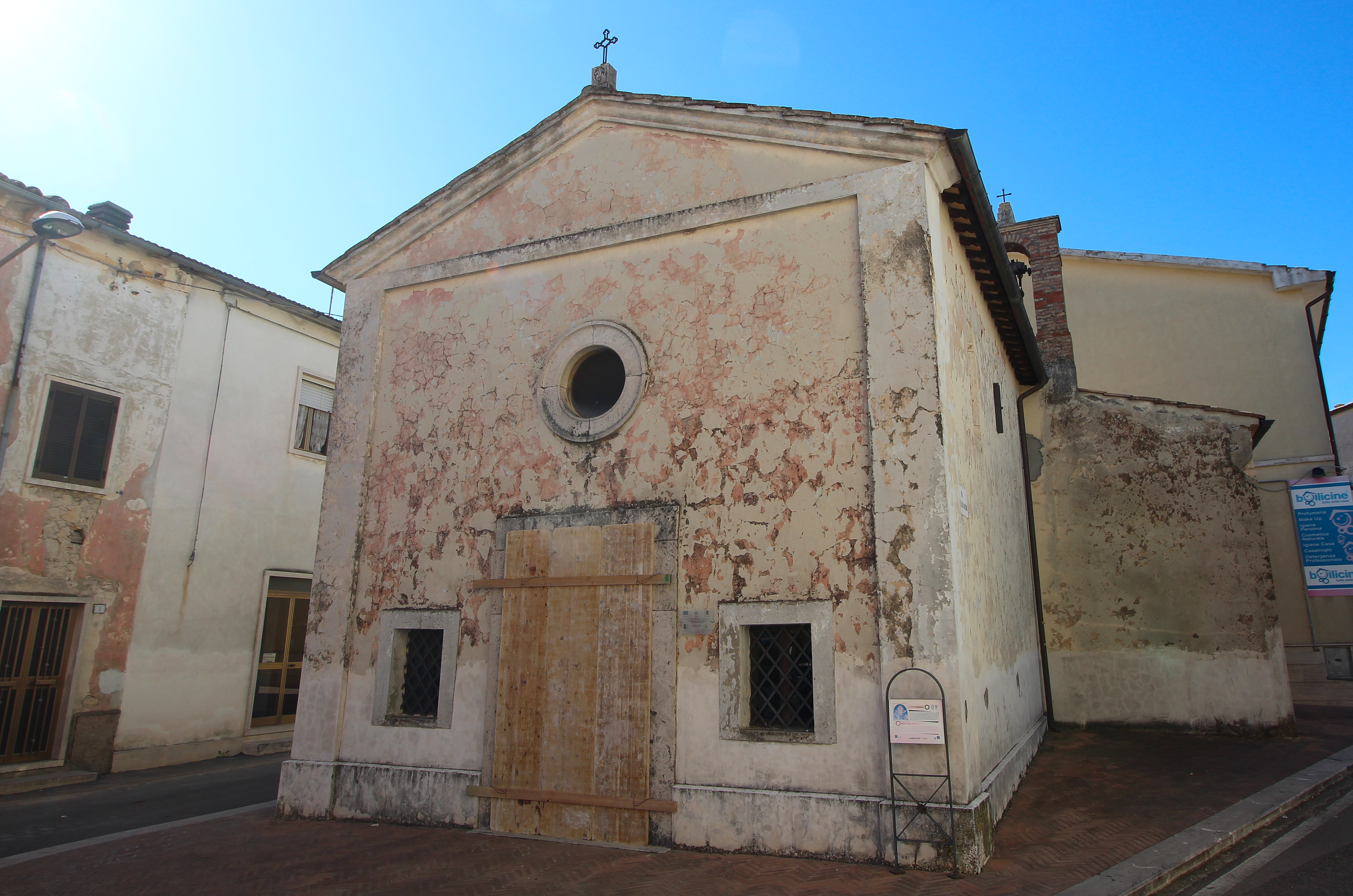
The church of Santa Lucia

Santa Lucia is a Roman Catholic church located in the town of Guardea, province of Terni, region of Umbria, Italy.

== History ==
The church was built at the site of an aedicule located at an intersection of roads. The church was built over the ages, with a final construction in the 19th century. The apse fresco, depicting Christ in Glory with the Madonna and St Joseph and the marriage ring, while below are Saints Agnes, Lucy, Francis of Assisi, Sebastian, and kneeling the donor D. Salvatore Luzi, was completed in 1890 by Domenico Bruschi. In the background is a view of Guardea at the time.
