= 10208 Germanicus =

Stony Florian asteroid and binary system from the inner regions of the asteroid belt

Discovery
- Discovered by: A. Vagnozzi
- Discovery site: Santa Lucia Obs.
- Discovery date: 30 August 1997

Designations
- Pronunciation: /dʒərˈmænɪkəs/
- Named after: Germanicus (Ancient Roman general)
- Alternative designations: 1997 QN_{1} · 1987 QJ_{7} 1994 WP_{12}
- Minor planet category: main-belt · Flora

Orbital characteristics
- Epoch 4 September 2017 (JD 2458000.5)
- Uncertainty parameter 0
- Observation arc: 28.69 yr (10,478 days)
- Aphelion: 2.6849 AU
- Perihelion: 1.7860 AU
- Semi-major axis: 2.2354 AU
- Eccentricity: 0.2011
- Orbital period (sidereal): 3.34 yr (1,221 days)
- Mean anomaly: 351.10°
- Mean motion: 0° 17^{m} 41.64^{s} / day
- Inclination: 4.5619°
- Longitude of ascending node: 223.63°
- Argument of perihelion: 115.01°
- Known satellites: 1 (Note: CBET No. 1087, 25 September 2007 – Central Bureau for Astronomical Telegrams for (10208) Germanicus: Photometric observations obtained between 6 August and 18 September 2007, show that 10208 Germanicus is a binary system with an orbital period of 58.55±0.02 hours. The primary has a period of 3.3484±0.0001 hours, and it has a lightcurve brightness variation of 0.13 magnitude. Mutual eclipse/occultation events with a depth 0.21 magnitude suggest a secondary-to-primary mean-diameter ratio of 0.46±0.02.Central Bureau for Astronomical Telegrams No. 1716 Julian Oey, Leura Observatory, Australia; Petr Pravec and Peter Kusnirak, Ondrejov Observatory; Yu. Krugly and Vasilij Chiorny, Kharkiv Observatory, Ukraine; and John. Ries, McDonald Observatory)

Physical characteristics
- Dimensions: 2.87±0.62 km 3.50 km (taken); 3.503 km 3.552±0.202 km
- Synodic rotation period: 3.1291±0.0002 h 3.3484±0.0001 h 3.3493±0.0006 h (Note: Pravec (2007) web: rotation period 3.3493±0.0006 hours with a brightness amplitude of 0.12 mag. Summary figures at Collaborative Asteroid Lightcurve Link (CALL) for (10208) Germanicus)
- Geometric albedo: 0.1747; 0.267±0.027; 0.36±0.19
- Spectral type: S
- Absolute magnitude (H): 14.2±0.2 (R) · 14.3 · 14.40 · 14.5 · 14.79±0.139

10208 Germanicus, provisional designation 1997 QN_{1}, is a stony Florian asteroid and binary system from the inner regions of the asteroid belt, approximately 3.5 kilometers in diameter.

It was discovered on 30 August 1997, by Italian amateur astronomer Antonio Vagnozzi at the Santa Lucia Stroncone Astronomical Observatory in Stroncone, Italy, and named for ancient Roman general Germanicus. The asteroid's minor-planet moon was discovered in 2007.

== Orbit and classification ==
Germanicus is a member of the Flora family, one of the largest families of stony asteroids. It orbits the Sun in the inner main-belt at a distance of 1.8–2.7 AU once every 3 years and 4 months (1,221 days). Its orbit has an eccentricity of 0.20 and an inclination of 5° with respect to the ecliptic. It was first observed at Crimea–Nauchnij and Brorfelde Observatory in August 1987, extending the body's observation arc by 10 years prior to its official discovery observation at Stroncone.

== Diameter and albedo ==
According to the survey carried out by NASA's Wide-field Infrared Survey Explorer with its subsequent NEOWISE mission, Germanicus measures 2.87 and 3.552 kilometers in diameter and its surface has an albedo of 0.36 and 0.267, respectively. The Collaborative Asteroid Lightcurve Link adopts Petr Pravec's revised WISE-data, that is, an albedo of 0.1747 and a diameter of 3.50 kilometers with an absolute magnitude of 14.79.

== Lightcurve and satellite ==
In August 2007, a rotational lightcurve of Germanicus was obtained from photometric observations by an international group of astronomers. Lightcurve analysis gave a rotation period of 3.1291 hours with a brightness variation of 0.13 magnitude (U=n.a.). It was also revealed that Germanicus is orbited by a minor-planet moon every 58.55 hours. The system has a high secondary-to-primary mean-diameter ratio of 0.46. This translates into a satellite diameter of 1.48 kilometers (based on a primary-diameter of 3.23 kilometers).

== Naming ==
This minor planet was named for the ancient Roman general and poet Germanicus (15 BC – AD 19), who led several successful campaigns into Germania. Germanicus was also the nephew and designated heir of the Roman Emperor Tiberius. As a poet, he wrote "Aratea", an astronomical treatise, which illustrated copy is known as the Leiden Aratea. The approved naming citation was published by the Minor Planet Center on 27 May 2010 (M.P.C. 70407).
