= Antonio Vagnozzi =

Italian astronomer

Minor planets discovered: 46
see § List of discovered minor planets

Antonio Vagnozzi (born 1950) is an amateur Italian astronomer and a discoverer of asteroids.

== Astronomical career ==
Vagnozzi is credited by the Minor Planet Center (MPC) with the discovery of 46 minor planets during 1993–1999. In 1993, he was Italy's first amateur astronomer (and the second discoverer worldwide) to discover a minor planet using a CCD camera. (The first numbered CCD-based discovery was 4255 Spacewatch, which was discovered by the Spacewatch project in 1986).

He also searches for supernovae and is a co-discoverer of SN 1996ae.

== Awards and honors ==
The main-belt asteroid 7529 Vagnozzi was named in his honor. The official naming citation was published by the MPC on 11 April 1998 (M.P.C. 31611).

== List of discovered minor planets ==
| 5609 Stroncone | 22 March 1993 | list |
| 5654 Terni | 20 May 1993 | list |
| 6417 Liberati | 4 December 1993 | list |
| 8943 Stefanozavka | 30 January 1997 | list |
| 10208 Germanicus | 30 August 1997 | list |
| 12358 Azzurra | 22 September 1993 | list |
| 14077 Volfango | 9 August 1996 | list |
| 15391 Steliomancinelli | 3 October 1997 | list |
| 17547 Nestebovelli | 21 September 1993 | list |
| 19262 Lucarubini | 29 July 1995 | list |

| 20139 Marianeschi | 19 August 1996 | list |
| 21160 Saveriolombardi | 10 October 1993 | list |
| 21189 Robertonesci | 3 May 1994 | list |
| 21190 Martamaffei | 10 May 1994 | list |
| (21287) 1996 UU_{3} | 31 October 1996 | list |
| 24137 Torre del Lago | 9 November 1999 | list |
| (26894) 1995 KN_{1} | 29 May 1995 | list |
| (39641) 1995 KM_{1} | 29 May 1995 | list |
| (42545) 1996 FR_{2} | 21 March 1996 | list |
| 43924 Martoni | 22 February 1996 | list |

| 44368 Andreafrigo | 22 September 1998 | list |
| (46648) 1995 SY | 22 September 1995 | list |
| (46656) 1995 WT_{6} | 28 November 1995 | list |
| (52459) 1995 DS | 21 February 1995 | list |
| (58292) 1994 GC | 2 April 1994 | list |
| (58500) 1996 VU_{1} | 6 November 1996 | list |
| (65812) 1996 SG_{7} | 30 September 1996 | list |
| (69351) 1994 AE_{3} | 15 January 1994 | list |
| (69425) 1996 BC | 16 January 1996 | list |
| (73719) 1993 FT | 22 March 1993 | list |

| (79213) 1994 EX | 8 March 1994 | list |
| (79314) 1996 DP_{1} | 23 February 1996 | list |
| (100174) 1994 AJ_{2} | 12 January 1994 | list |
| (100187) 1994 BT_{4} | 29 January 1994 | list |
| (100198) 1994 EA_{1} | 9 March 1994 | list |
| (100352) 1995 TD_{1} | 14 October 1995 | list |
| (118216) 1996 DU_{1} | 22 February 1996 | list |
| (120499) 1993 NA | 9 July 1993 | list |
| (120500) 1993 OM | 24 July 1993 | list |
| (129473) 1993 TK | 10 October 1993 | list |

| (129543) 1996 RU_{5} | 14 September 1996 | list |
| (178300) 1993 ON | 24 July 1993 | list |
| (185663) 1994 EE | 4 March 1994 | list |
| (213005) 1993 RC | 11 September 1993 | list |
| (241583) 1996 UV_{3} | 31 October 1996 | list |
| (269695) 1996 VW_{1} | 6 November 1996 | list |
| (275494) 1993 PA | 10 August 1993 | list |

== See also ==
- List of minor planet discoverers § A. Vagnozzi
- Santa Lucia Stroncone Astronomical Observatory
