= Avigliano Umbro =

- Comune
- Comune di Avigliano Umbro
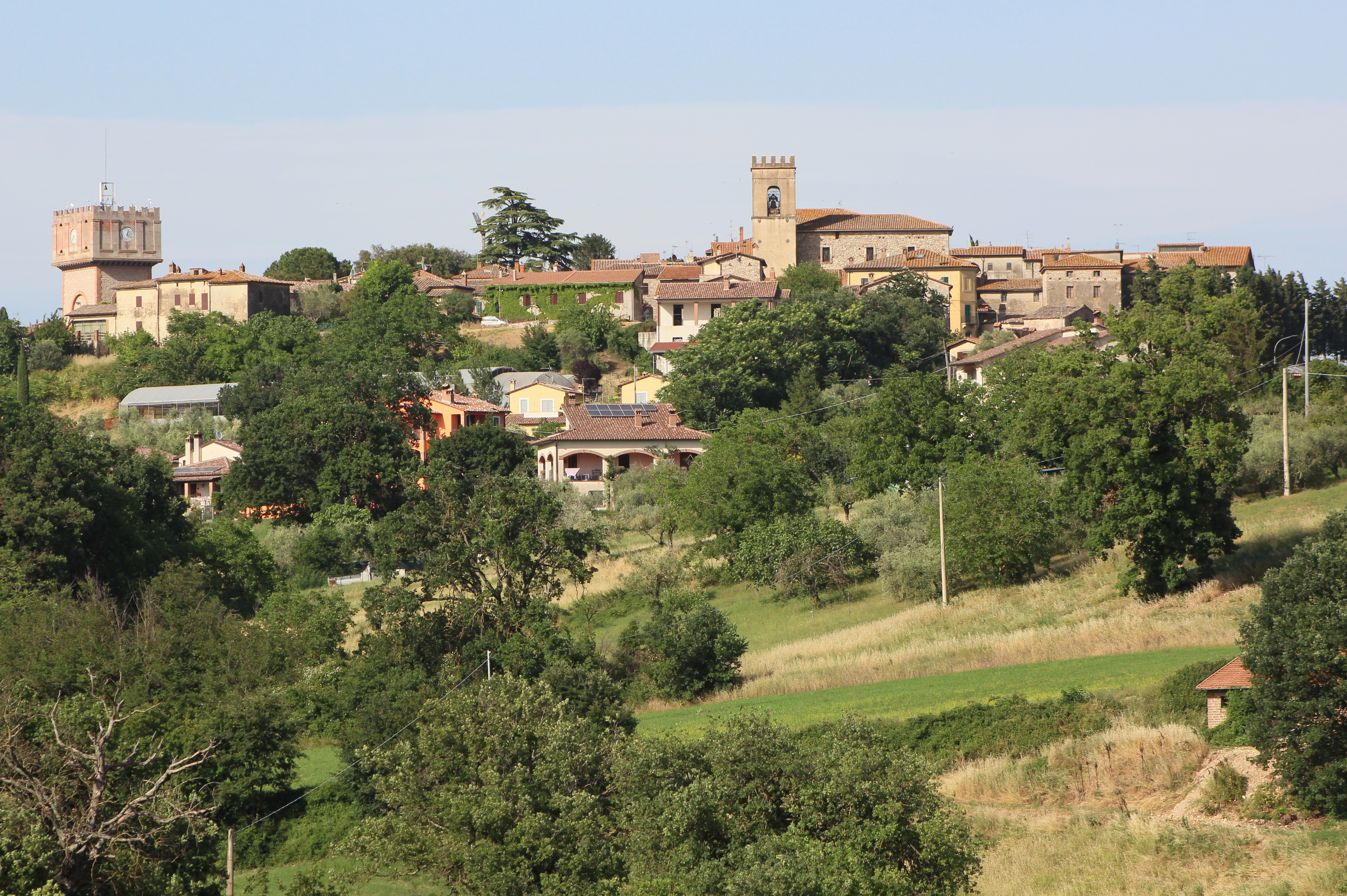
- View of Avigliano Umbro

- Coat of arms

- Location within Italy Location within Umbria
- Coordinates: 42.655409°N 12.428481°E
- Country: Italy
- Region: Umbria
- Province: Terni (TR)

Government
  - Mayor: Luciano Conti

Area
  - Total: 51.32 km^{2} (19.81 sq mi)
- Elevation: 441 m (1,447 ft)

Population (1 January 2025)
  - Total: 2,317
  - Density: 45.15/km^{2} (116.9/sq mi)
- Demonym: Aviglianesi
- Time zone: UTC+1 (CET)
  - Summer (DST): UTC+2 (CEST)
- Postal code: 05020
- Dialing code: 0744
- Website: Official website

Avigliano Umbro is a comune (municipality) in the Province of Terni in the Italian region Umbria, located about 50 km south of Perugia and about 20 km northwest of Terni. As of the 2021 census its population was of 2,317.

== History ==
The territory of Avigliano has been inhabited since prehistoric times, as attested by archaeological discoveries at the Grotta Bella of Santa Restituta.

During the Roman era, the settlement was located along the Via Amerina. In the Middle Ages, Avigliano emerged as an important center within the territory known as the Terre Arnolfe. It is mentioned in the regesto of Farfa Abbey. In the 12th century, following the dissolution of the Arnolfi lordship, the territory passed under the dominion of Todi.

In 1859, Avigliano had a population of 610 inhabitants, living in 112 families occupying 112 houses. In the mid-19th century, the inhabitants of Avigliano were described as almost entirely landowning agriculturalists.

In 1975 Avigliano Umbro became an independent municipality after separating from Montecastrilli.

In the early 1990s a music school founded by Mogol, an Italian lyricist best known for his collaborations with Lucio Battisti, was established in Avigliano.

== Geography ==
Avigliano is situated on a high hill and lies about 4.5 miles (7.2 km) from Montecastrilli, 8 miles (13 km) from Amelia, and approximately 12 miles (19 km) from both Todi and Narni. The area is characterized by woodland, and chestnut trees are particularly abundant.

The municipality borders with Acquasparta, Amelia Guardea, Montecastrilli, Montecchio, and Todi, this one in the Province of Perugia.

=== Subdivisions ===
The municipality includes the localities of Avigliano Umbro, Dunarobba, Fabbreria, Palombara-Palazzo, Poggio, Rena, Santa Restituta, Sismano, Toscolano. These settlements are generally situated on hills near the Monti Corsini.

In 2021, 542 people lived in rural dispersed dwellings not assigned to any named locality. At the time, the most populous locality was Avigliano Umbro proper (1,407).

== Religion and culture ==
=== Santissima Trinità ===
The church of the Santissima Trinità serves as the parish church. It was built in the 17th century as part of the castle of the Vici family. In later centuries the building underwent extensive restoration, during which much of its painted decoration was lost as several walls were whitewashed.

Despite these alterations, the church retains a number of artworks. Among them is the Madonna of the Rosary with Saint John the Evangelist, Saint Dominic, Saint Catherine and Saint Cecilia, attributed to Andrea Polinori. Other surviving works include frescoes depicting saints, such as a Saint Anthony Abbot and a Conversion of Saint Paul attributed to Bartolomeo Barbiani. The church also preserves a 14th-century silver and enamel cross, along with additional paintings by Polinori representing the Deposition and Saint Lawrence.

=== Santissima Annunziata, Toscolano ===
The church of the Santissima Annunziata is located just outside the village of Toscolano, within the municipality of Avigliano. It consists of a single nave and incorporates, as its rear wall, a votive edicule decorated with frescoes attributed to the Umbrian Renaissance painter Piermatteo d'Amelia.

The decorative cycle on the front of the edicule depicts, on the left, an angel bearing an announcing scroll, at the centre God the Father represented as a dove, and on the right the Virgin Annunciate holding an open book. The church also preserves numerous ex votos donated following a plague.

=== Other religious buildings ===
Avigliano has the churches of Sant'Angelo, San Giovanni, Sant'Egidio.

=== Fossil forest ===
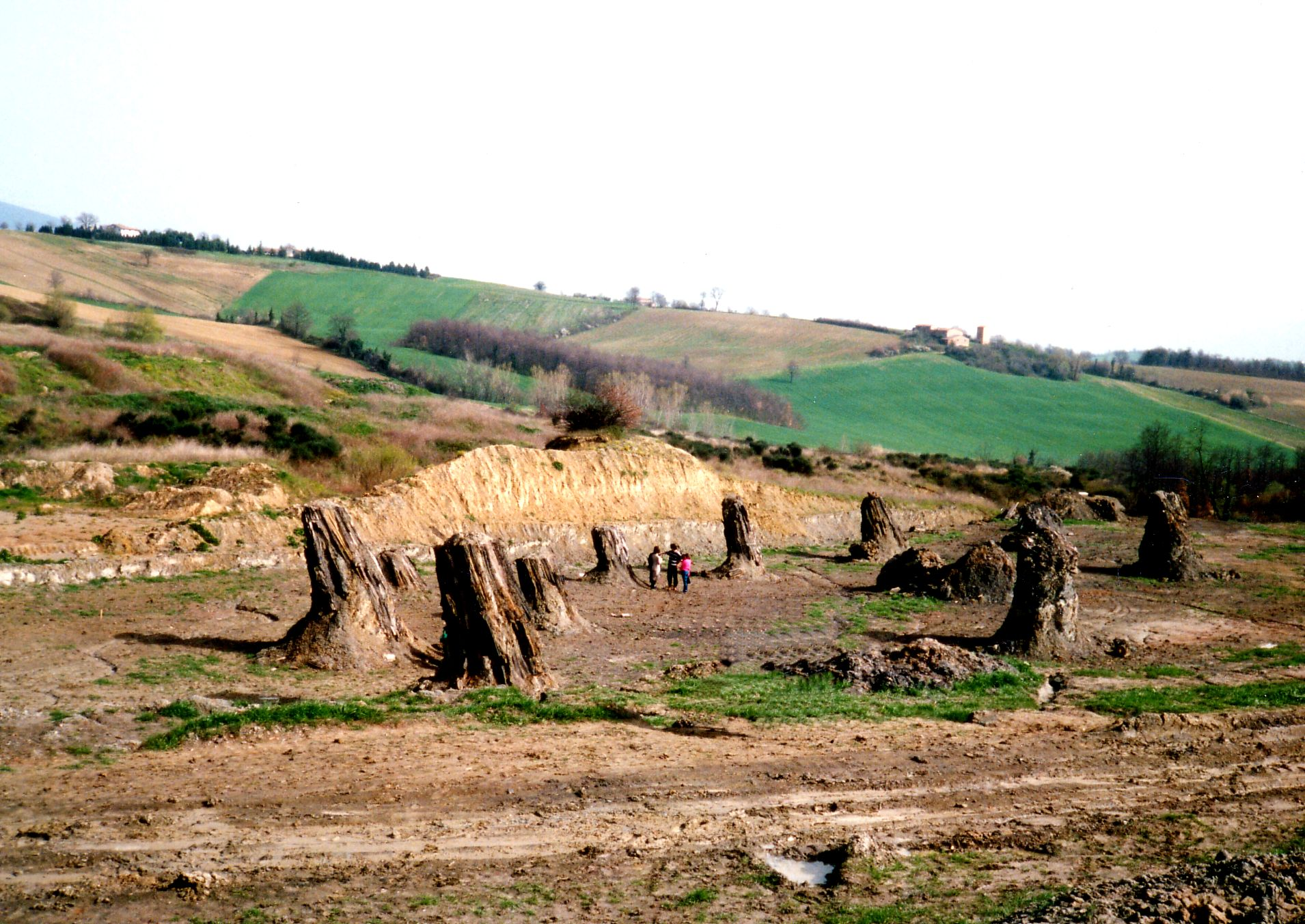
Dunarobba Fossil Forest

Near Dunarobba lies the Fossil Forest, a natural site formed approximately 1.5 million years ago and composed of the remains of large sequoias. The area has been the subject of scientific study since its discovery in the late 20th century, and a Centre for Plant Palaeontology was established in the 1990s to support research and illustrate the geological characteristics of the site.

=== Other cultural heritage ===
Within the historic centre of Avigliano, traces of the medieval urban fabric remain visible in the walls, the entrance gate, and a large cylindrical tower surmounted by a public clock. The main gate also preserves a marble eagle, symbol of Todi, recalling the historical disputes between Todi and Amelia over the territory during the Middle Ages. The town also has a characteristic Liberty-style theatre, built in 1928.

Santa Restituta rises near an important archaeological area known as Grotta Bella. Excavations there have brought to light numerous statuettes dating to the protohistoric and Roman periods.
