= Lake Arezzo =

Artificial lake in Umbria, Italy

Lago di Arezzo
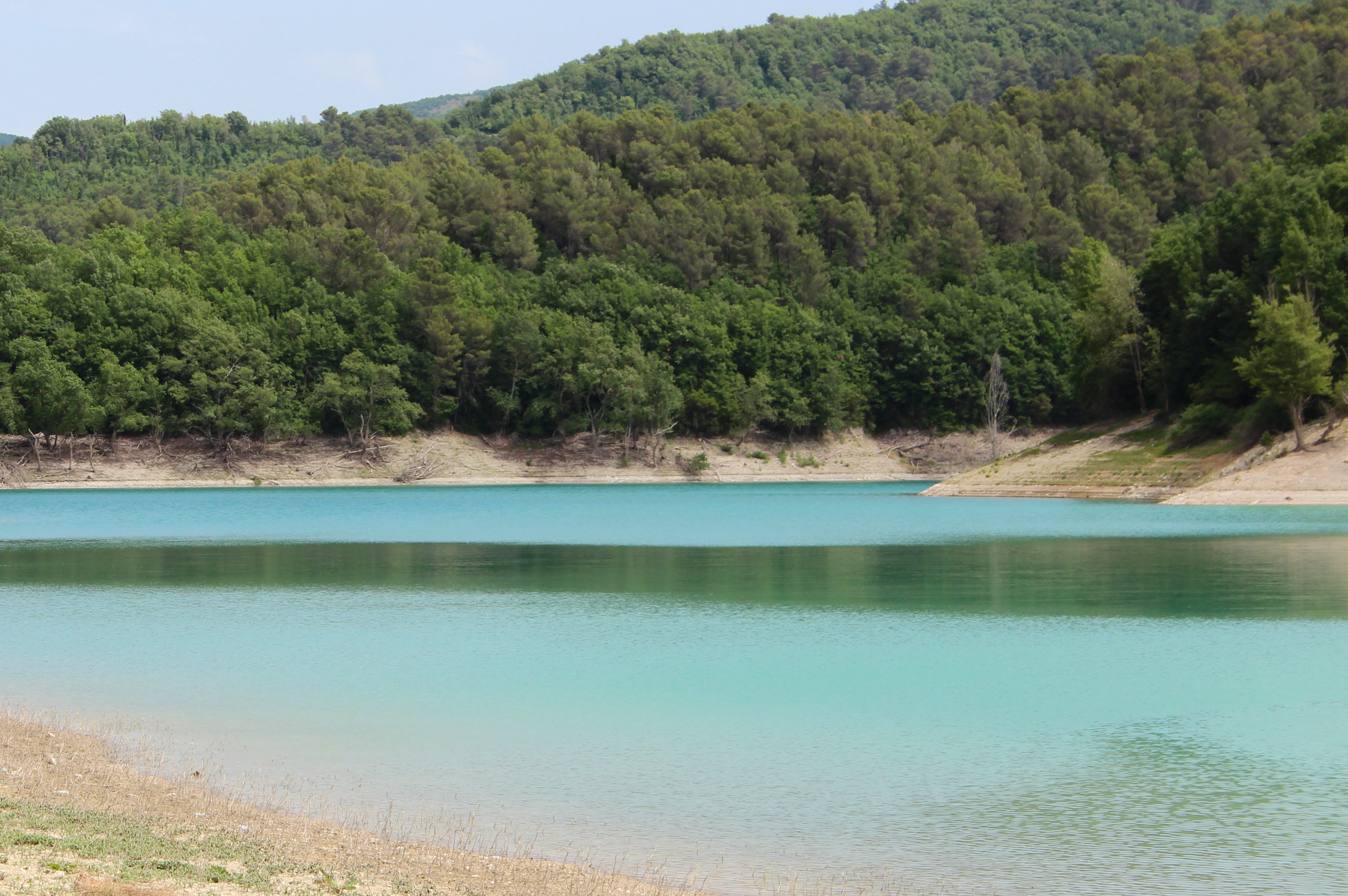
- Interactive map of Lago di Arezzo
- Location: Umbria, Italy
- Coordinates: 42°55′0″N 12°30′0″E
- Type: Artificial lake
- Primary inflows: Maroggia
- Primary outflows: Maroggia

Lago di Arezzo is a small artificial basin located in Umbria, at 400 m (1,300 ft) above sea level, between the Province of Terni and the Province of Perugia.

== Description ==
The lake is situated among the Martani Mountains, along the provincial road 418 that leads from Acquasparta to Spoleto. It is also known as "Lake of Firenzuola", from the name of the village that overlooks it. It was formed in the 1960s by damming the Maroggia stream.

The lake was formed by damming the Maroggia stream with the Arezzo dam, whose first project was developed in 1955 to regulate its floods. The executive project is from 1956, approved by the Ministry of Public Works in 1958, the year in which the works began, completed in 1962. The dam was finally tested in 1964 after requiring a total expenditure of about 500 million Italian Lire, the movement of 18,000 cubic meters of earth and 65,000 cubic meters of concrete. Since 1977, it has also been used as an irrigation basin, thanks to a capacity of 6.5 million cubic meters of water (of which 3.6 are dedicated to irrigation and the rest to flood regulation) and a particular intake work that is kept just below the water level to ensure a temperature tolerable by the crops.

The lake basin, nestled between the hills, is not easily accessible: the two only access routes are indeed quite rugged, the first from the cemetery of Firenzuola, the other from the village of Messenano. For this reason, the lake is not much frequented, except by a few fishermen who go there to catch fish such as carp, European perch, bleak, ide, largemouth bass, pike, and trout
