= Antonio da Stroncone =

Italian Franciscan friar and Blessed

Blessed Antonio da Stroncone OFM
- Born: 1381; Stroncone, Umbria
- Died: 7 February 1461; Assisi
- Venerated in: Roman Catholic Church
- Beatified: 28 June 1687, Saint Peter's Basilica by Pope Innocent XI
- Feast: 7 February, 14 February (in the Order of Friars Minor)
- Attributes: Franciscan habit

Antonio da Stroncone (1391 – 7 February 1461) was an Italian friar of the Order of Friars Minor. He became a member of that order in his youth after cultivating a strong devotion to Francis of Assisi during his childhood with his parents who were members of the Third Order of Saint Francis.

His beatification received formal confirmation from Pope Innocent XI on 28 June 1687 after the pontiff ratified the friar's enduring and local 'cultus' - otherwise known as popular veneration. His uncle was the Franciscan friar Giovanni da Stroncone.

== Life ==
Antonio da Stroncone was born in 1391 in the Umbria province to ancient nobles of the Vici. His parents – Lodovico and Isabella – were both members of the Third Order of Saint Francis.

During his childhood his parents instilled in him a great sense of faith and ardent devotion to Francis of Assisi and after he turned twelve he begged the superior of his town's Franciscan convent to admit him. The superior believed it better to defer this request to a later time due to Antonio's age and his health, though the latter repeated his pleas three times and was accepted once the superior relented to his tears and allowed him to join the convent.

His superiors acknowledged Antonio da Stroncone's great talents and so wanted him to become a religious priest, but he instead begged and succeeded in deferring from that to instead make his vows.

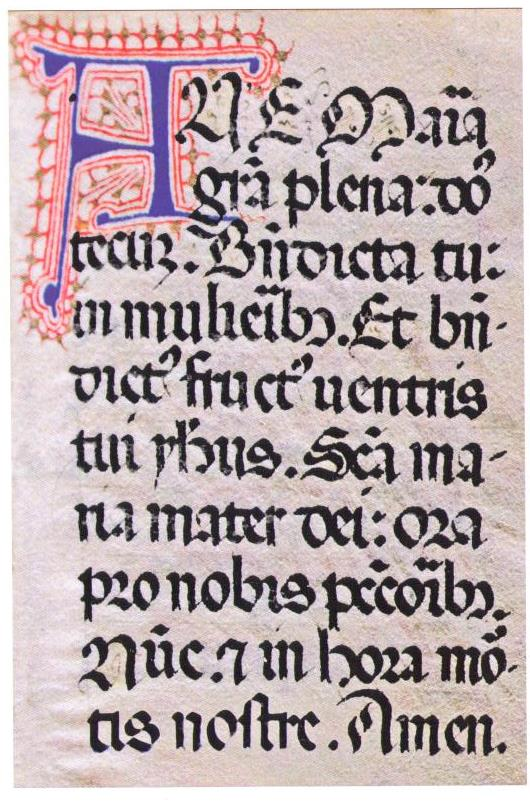
The Ave Maria in the prayer booklet of Blessed Antonio da Stroncone

At the end of his novitiate he was sent to Fiesole where his uncle oversaw his spiritual instruction and that in turn was later entrusted to Tommaso Bellacci. In 1428 he was sent to Corsica to aid friars in establishing other convents and he remained there until 1430 when he retired to a quiet convent in Assisi. From 1411 to 1420 he was the assistant novice master in Fiesole and with Bellacci from 1420 to 1425 sought to convert and repress the heretical movement of the Fraticelli. On one occasion he is said to have had a vision of Jesus Christ in which Christ declared how pleased he was with Antonio when he lit numerous candles; the friar then adopted the practice of lighting as many candles as possible near the altar with an emphasis on doing so on the various feasts of the Lord and the Blessed Virgin Mary. His deep devotion to the Eucharist caused him to beg on his knees for the forgiveness of the other friars for his sins on those days that he was to receive Communion. Antonio also made small wooden crosses in his spare time and placed them in various spots in the convent grounds. He ventured out barefoot as both a penitential act and one of poverty.

Antonio died at the beginning of 1461 and was interred under the floor of the convent of San Damiano, Assisi where he spent the latter part of his life. Even before he died he pleaded to be allowed to rise from his bed in order to attend Mass. In 1462 a flame burst forth from the site of his grave to which James of the Marches exclaimed that "this is a sign of God". He had the floor lifted and the incorrupt remains were found with an odor of perfume before being relocated; the remains were moved once again in 1599 and later to Stroncone on 21 August 1809. In 1649 a woman suffering from demonic possession was brought before the late friar's remains and the remains – it was said – sat up and one hand raised above the other.

== Beatification ==
Antonio da Stroncone's was beatified by Pope Innocent XI on 28 June 1687 after he approved a decree that ratified the friar's enduring popular veneration.
