= Guardea =

- Comune
- Comune di Guardea
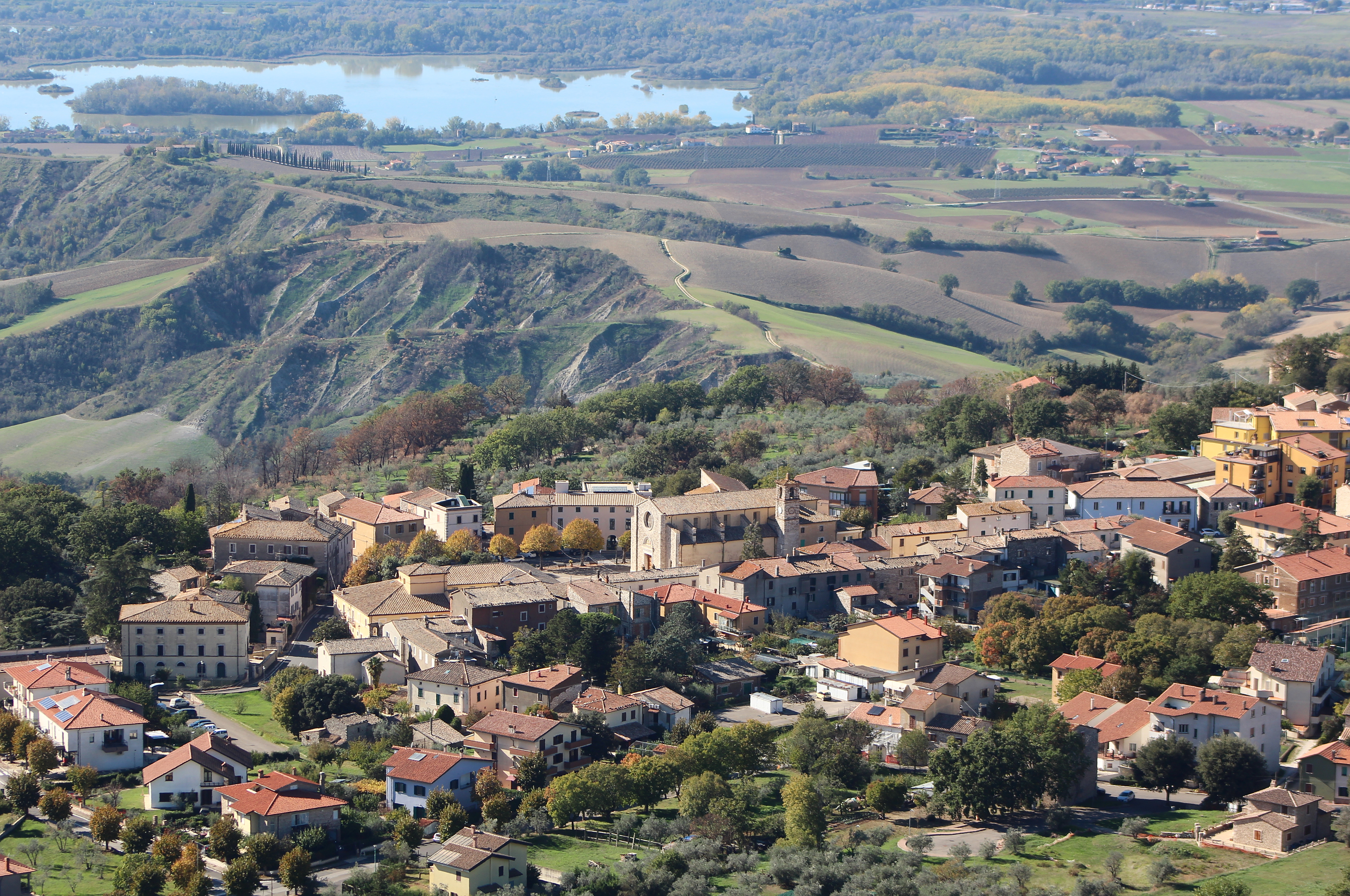
- View of Guardea

- Coat of arms

- Location within Italy Location within Umbria
- Coordinates: 42.623587°N 12.29716°E
- Country: Italy
- Region: Umbria
- Province: Terni (TR)

Government
  - Mayor: Gianfranco Costa

Area
  - Total: 39.3 km^{2} (15.2 sq mi)
- Elevation: 387 m (1,270 ft)

Population (1 January 2025)
  - Total: 1,735
  - Density: 44.1/km^{2} (114/sq mi)
- Demonym: Guardeesi
- Time zone: UTC+1 (CET)
  - Summer (DST): UTC+2 (CEST)
- Postal code: 05025
- Dialing code: 0744
- Website: Official website

Guardea is a comune (municipality) in the Province of Terni in the Italian region Umbria, located about 60 km south of Perugia and about 30 km west of Terni.

== Etymology ==
Guardea is said to have taken its name from its wide and commanding view, deriving from the idea of "looking" or "watching" over the surrounding landscape.

== History ==
In the 10th century the territory was a fief of the counts Uffreduzzi, who constructed the castle that formed the nucleus of the settlement. With the extinction of the Uffreduzzi male line, control passed to the Alviano. Under their rule the site functioned as a fortress and a point for the collection of tributes and tolls.

An act of submission to Todi was issued in 1235. In 1308 the Alviano in turn submitted to the Guelph municipality of Orvieto.

Between 1450 and 1465 the territory was held by Count Everso degli Anguillara, during which period it was removed from papal control. In 1465 it was restored to the Holy See. Pope Paul II granted favors to the community, confirming its statutes and possessions.

In 1488 Francesco d'Alviano granted communal self-government and civil rights, providing for administration by four priori. Toward the end of the 15th century the old hilltop castle was abandoned and a new settlement was constructed in the plain. As a result, the newer habitation did not develop as a compact, nucleated village, but rather as scattered and isolated groups of houses.

After the extinction of the Alviano line the territory passed under the direct control of the Apostolic Camera and was governed in succession by the Monaldeschi, the counts of Marsciano, and the Clementini. In 1592 Cornelio Clementini was executed for committing violent acts and abusing his authority, after which the lands were transferred to tenants.

During the early 18th century the new settlement in the plain expanded and became known as Guardea, while the former hilltop site took the name Poggio Guardea. Fevers were common in summer among those working in the valley of the Tiber.

In 1701, Guardea was a feudal domain of various Counts Marsciani, a status which it is recorded as retaining in 1803. By 1816, it had passed to Count Francesco Testa di Marsciano.

In 1816 Guardea and Poggio di Guardea were listed as baronial places within the Delegation of Spoleto. The following year the community was united to Amelia, seat of the governorship, with the appodiati of Alviano, Frattuccia and Poggio di Guardea.

The same administrative structure remained by 1858, though Alviano ceased to be an appodiato.

In 1895 Guardea had 1,515 inhabitants.

== Geography ==
Guardea is situated on a hill at an elevation of 387 metres (1,270 ft) above sea level, on the left bank of the Tiber, from which it lies 5 kilometres (3.1 mi) distant.

In earlier times the settlement stood on the summit of a mountain at 572 metres (1,877 ft) above sea level. The site was later abandoned because of the difficulty inhabitants faced in climbing to it after agricultural labor.

Guardea is located about 9 miles (14 km) from Amelia, while Alviano lies at a distance of 2 miles (3.2 km).

Guardea borders the following municipalities: Alviano, Amelia, Avigliano Umbro, Civitella d'Agliano, Montecastrilli, Montecchio.

=== Subdivisions ===
The municipality includes the localities of Case Branca, Cocciano, Frattuccia, Guardea, Le Case, Madonna del Porto, Poggio Nuovo-Casaline, Tavoletta, Turrida-Sasso Grande.

In 2021, 277 people lived in rural dispersed dwellings not assigned to any named locality. At the time, the most populous locality was Guardea proper (1,138).

== Economy ==
Agriculture formed the basis of the local economy in the 19th century, supported by fertile lands along the Tiber valley. The production of cereals, wine, oil and fruit was complemented by a significant silkworm industry.

== Religion and culture ==
=== Castello di Guardea Vecchia ===
The ruins of the ancient castle of Guardea Vecchia retain standing wall sections amounting to roughly one third of the original height, while the full line of the perimeter can still be traced. The curtain wall has many gaps, but much of the system of eight towers remains visible—six square and two semicircular—along with the large central keep.

=== Castello del Poggio ===
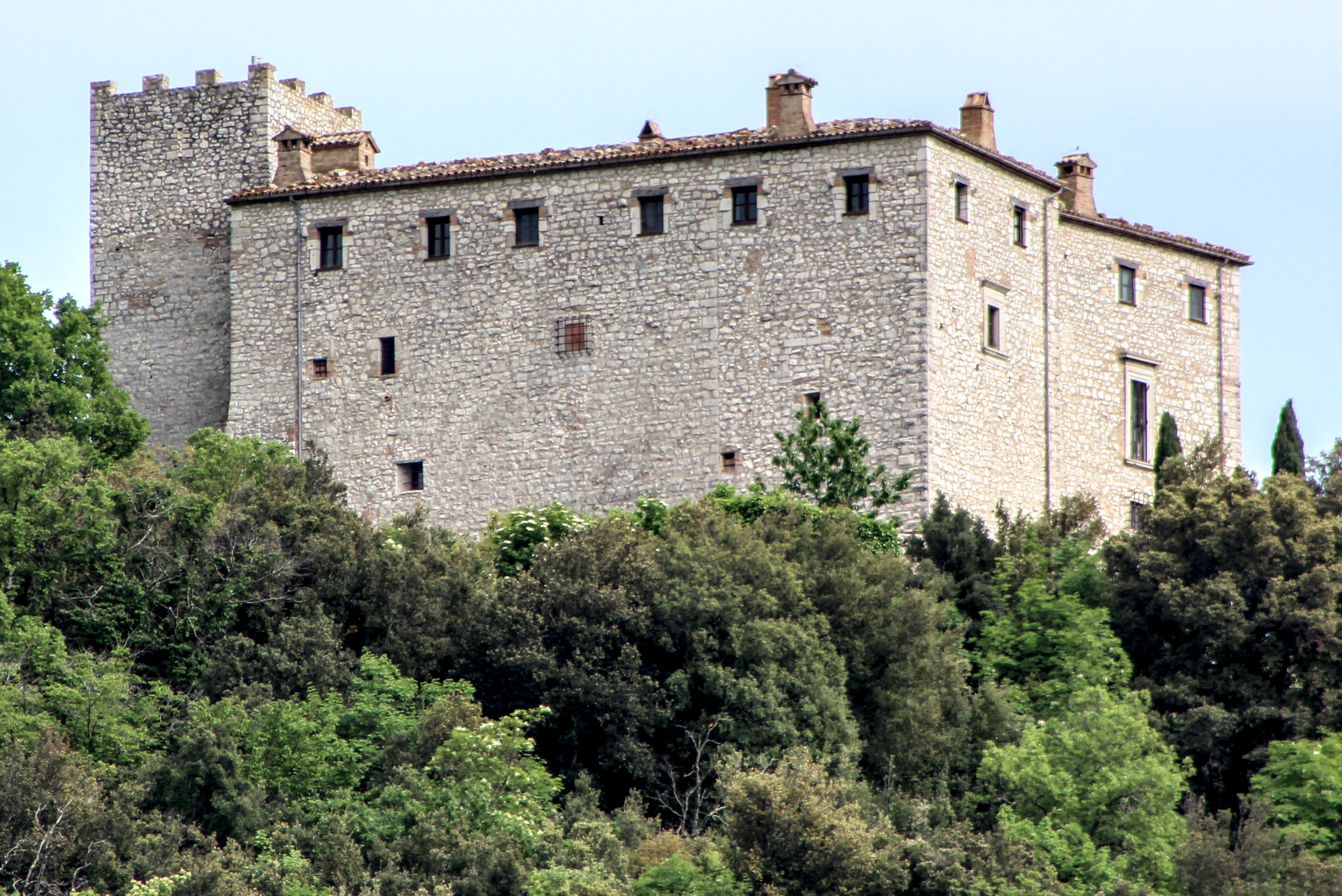
Castello del Poggio

The Castello del Poggio stands on the summit of a hill almost directly opposite Guardea Vecchia. It was probably built at the beginning of the 11th century, incorporating earlier structures. The castle has long been a residence of prominent figures, including Lucrezia Borgia, who received it as a gift from her brother Cesare, Filiberto of Savoy, Princess Olimpia Maidalchini, and the Italian-American comedian Jimmy Savo.

=== Church and Hermitage of Saint Illuminata ===
A few kilometres south of Guardea stand the remains of the church and convent of Santa Illuminata. Tradition holds that the complex was founded in 1007 by Saint Romuald, founder of the Camaldolese order, and that after about two centuries it was transferred to the Franciscans. Saint Francis is said to have stayed there several times, sleeping in a nearby cave on a block of travertine that remains an object of veneration. Many friars lived and died there; the best known is Blessed Pascuccio, whose remains are venerated by the population in the parish church.

The decline of the church and convent began in 1653, when Pope Innocent X incorporated its assets into the parish of Santa Maria dell'Olmo in Amelia. In 1869 the church was judged structurally unsafe, and from that time Mass was no longer celebrated there.

=== Other religious heritage ===
The church of Saints Peter and Giles consists of a single nave and contains five altars and an organ. It houses a valued painting of the Last Supper and another depicting Blessed Angelina of Marsciano, which was attributed by many to a notable hand. Saint Giles is venerated as the patron saint, and his feast is celebrated on 1 September.

Among the churches is the parish church of Santi Pietro e Cesareo and the church of Santa Lucia.

== Notable families ==
The principal families of Guardea included the Counts of Marsciano, to whom the town formerly belonged, as well as the Salusti, Rinaldi and Innocenzi families.

== Twin towns ==
- Champignelles, France
- Gubbio, Italy
