= Lago di Recentino =

Lake in Narni, Umbria, Italy

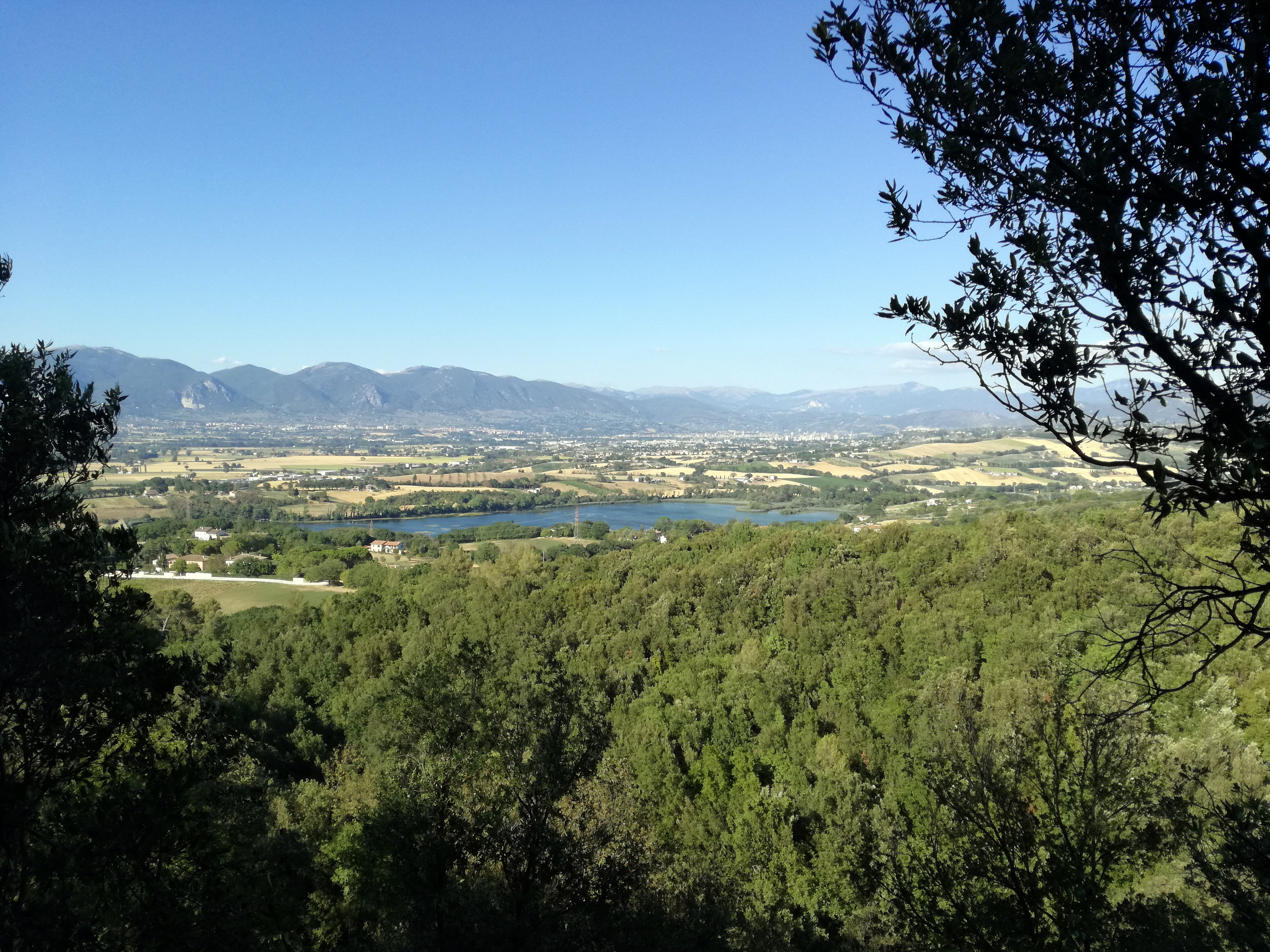
- Recentino lake, near Trieste (IT)

- Location within Umbria
- Location: Province of Terni, Umbria
- Coordinates: 42.518517°N 12.54982°E
- Basin countries: Italy

Lago di Recentino, also known as Lago di Narni, is a man-made lake in the Province of Terni, Umbria, Italy. This lake is a stop for migratory birds such as cormorants and seagulls.
