= Stroncone =

- Comune
- Comune di Stroncone
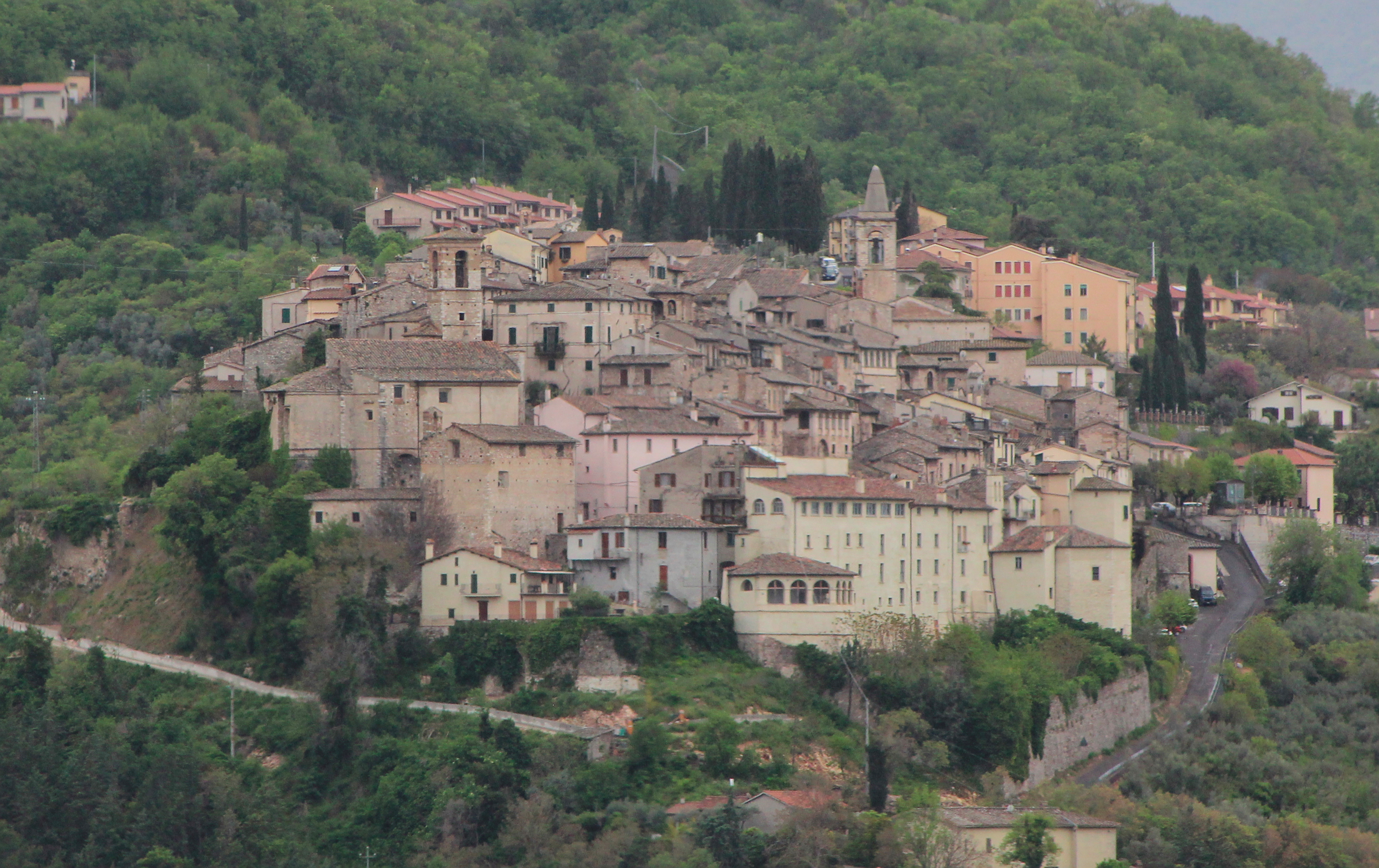
- View of Stroncone

- Coat of arms

- Location within Italy Location within Umbria
- Coordinates: 42.498245°N 12.662739°E
- Country: Italy
- Region: Umbria
- Province: Terni (TR)

Government
  - Mayor: Alberto Falcini

Area
  - Total: 71.17 km^{2} (27.48 sq mi)
- Elevation: 451 m (1,480 ft)

Population (1 January 2025)
  - Total: 4,613
  - Density: 64.82/km^{2} (167.9/sq mi)
- Demonym: Stroncolini or Stronconesi
- Time zone: UTC+1 (CET)
  - Summer (DST): UTC+2 (CEST)
- Postal code: 05039
- Dialing code: 0744
- Website: Official website

Stroncone is a comune (municipality) in the Province of Terni in the Italian region Umbria, located about 70 km southeast of Perugia and about 8 km south of Terni. It is one of I Borghi più belli d'Italia ("The most beautiful villages of Italy").

== Etymology ==
The name Stroncone is traced to Duke Ugone of Spoleto. According to this tradition it derives from the form castrum Hugonis, which is said to have evolved through the successive names Castrugone, Strungone, and finally Stroncone.

== History ==
There have been attempts to connect the area around Stroncone with the former city of Trebula Suffenas, but it is instead reported that only around the 10th century a group settled on the hill and built a castle.

Stroncone is first documented in 1012, when Giovanni di Pietro made a donation to the monastery of San Simeone. The donation included land in the Stroncone area, houses and small rural dwellings within the castle, and a share in the church of Sant'Angelo, which in that document is referred to as an oratory.

In the 11th century Stroncone was a fortified castle with walls, with houses, a square, and places of worship inside. It was linked to Narni and lay within the Diocese of Narni. In 1156 the castle was donated to the monks of Farfa.

In 1215 Pope Innocent III granted Stroncone municipal self-rule. Politically it is identified as Guelph. Its civic arms are given as a white cross on red, together with the papal keys. In the 13th century Stroncone and Narni supported the papal army against Emperor Frederick II, while Terni opposed them.

Throughout the 13th century Stroncone was involved in harsh and bloody conflicts with Narni. In 1357 the Ghibellines drove the Guelphs out of the castle; the Guelphs later reoccupied it and expelled their opponents.

In the 14th century governance is associated with rectors of the Papal State, named as Ugo Augeri, Bernardus De Lacu, Pietro di Vico, Girolamo Orsini, Francesco Orsini, and Nicola Orsini. After the end of the Avignon Papacy, in 1377 these were replaced by vicars of the Holy See, who ruled through a commissioner. In January 1378 Pope Gregory XI recognized Stroncone as directly subject to the Holy See, a privilege later confirmed by Pope Leo X.

The fortress is recorded as having been occupied in 1394 by Pandolfo Malatesta. In 1404, after Andrea Tomacelli seized the fortress, the people of Stroncone rose up and put his soldiers to flight.

In 1463 Pope Pius II, returning to Rome after the end of a plague, visited Stroncone and left an important account of the fertile countryside and the town's strong position.

In the 15th century the Friars Minor are credited with strong political and economic influence. Among the institutions founded were a mount of piety in 1466 and a Monte Frumentario in 1489.

In 1527 the town ran a serious risk of being looted and burned by the troops led by the Constable of Bourbon to the siege of Rome. Rebuilding after this period is said to be visible in the fabric of the town's buildings, especially around the block of the town hall and along the walls.

In the 16th century Stroncone was governed by cardinals of the Sacred College through the office of the podestà. Following the administrative reform of Pope Sixtus V, it was placed directly under the Apostolic Camera and administered by a resident apostolic commissioner. Alongside the Palazzo dei Priori, an apostolic palace was built, including the governor’s residence and attached prisons. In the late 16th century the castle had about 500 inhabitants, and the surrounding countryside is given as having under 600 hearths.

On the night of 10–11 February 1799 the ultimi Guelfi took possession of Stroncone, looted the houses of the Jacobins, and, after gathering the municipality’s abandoned artillery, prepared to resist the republican armies. After eight days of siege, a capitulation was signed, but it did not prevent a further sack of the town.

Stroncone had 3,399 inhabitants in the late 19th century.

In 1929 Stroncone was merged into the municipality of Terni. Administrative self-rule was restored in 1947, after World War II.

== Geography ==
Stroncone stands on a hill at 451 metres (1,480 ft) elevation. It lies about 5 miles (8.0 km) south of Terni. The town dominates a smaller hill to its north, where the Church of Saint Antimo stands.

The town reportedly has a temperate climate. The Aia stream is about 3 miles (4.8 km) away. Woodlands in the area are named Monte Rotondo, Monte Grandi, and the Capoliana bosco sacro.

The municipality borders with Calvi dell'Umbria, Configni (RI), Cottanello, Greccio, Narni, Otricoli, Rieti (RI) and Terni.

=== Subdivisions ===
The municipality includes the localities of Aguzzo, Cerreta, Cesale, Cimitelle, Colle, Colle Perugino, Colle Ricco, Colmartino, Coppe, Finocchieto, Forcella, I Prati, Le Ville, Macchia Morta, Piane, San Gregorio, Sant'Antimo, Stroncone, Termine, Vasciano, Vascigliano.

In 2021, 725 people lived in rural dispersed dwellings not assigned to any named locality. At the time, the most populous localities were Stroncone proper (2,151), and Colle (474).

The Prati di Stroncone, located near the municipality at roughly 1,000 metres (3,300 ft), form a high plateau at the foot of Monte Macchialunga. The area consists of open grasslands with sparse large trees and serves as a recreational landscape. Trails from the plateau connect to surrounding peaks overlooking the Conca Ternana and the Rieti plain.

== Economy ==
In the 19th century, the territory was said to abound in olive oil and wine, while lacking wheat. From the surrounding mountains it was reported that high-quality travertine was quarried, along with red marble and durable sandstone.

Several stone and mineral resources were noted in the area. In the contrada of Pozzacchiete there was white travertine. At Voltelle there is a quarry of a translucent stone likened to white alabaster. At Le Schiegge there was a quarry of red stone streaked with white. There were also stones suitable for fire-making, multicoloured breccia, and coral breccia.

== Transport ==
Stroncone has a stop on the Terni–Sulmona railway, with trains to Terni, Rieti and L'Aquila.

== Religion and culture ==
=== San Giovanni Decollato ===
The church of San Giovanni Decollato dates to the first half of the 15th century. Inside, later decorations include works by Giuseppe Bastiani and baroque elements by Gregorio and Cristoforo Grimani.

The church stands in the main square and has an organ. Its vault is decorated with arabesques and paintings representing the actions of the saint, attributed to the brothers Federico and Taddeo Zuccari.

=== San Nicolò ===
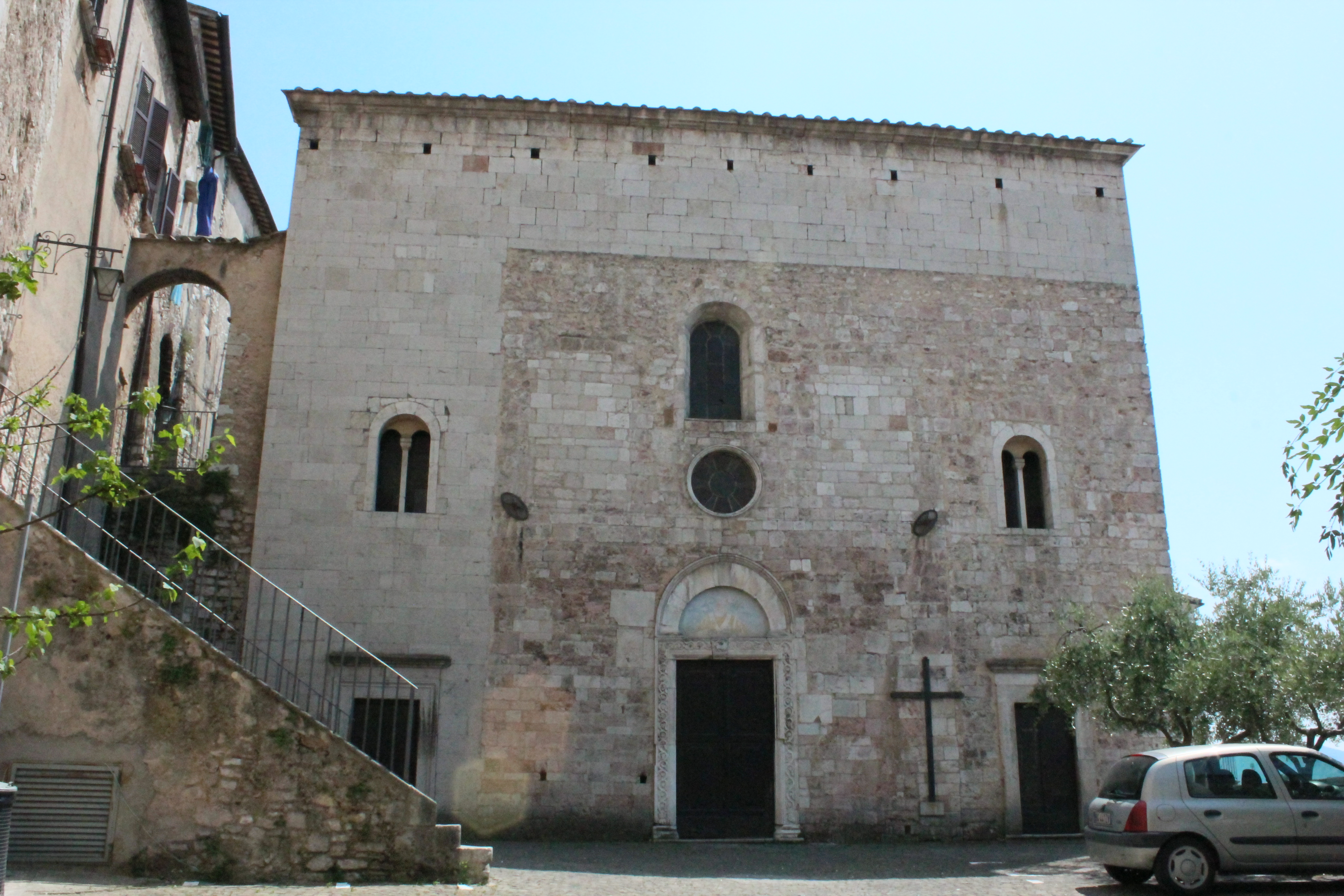
church of San Nicolò

The church of San Nicolò was donated in 1181 to the abbey of San Benedetto in Fundis. Its original structure has been significantly altered, but the main entrance survives with 12th-century carvings. The interior preserves paintings and frescoes from the 17th and 18th centuries and a polyptych in the sacristy attributed to Rinaldo di Calvi dating to 1520–1521.

=== Convent of San Francesco ===
The Convent of San Francesco stands south of the walls and, according to tradition, was founded by Saint Francis in 1213. In the 17th century it became a center of theological and historical studies. Its library grew through bequests and donations and remains arranged in its historical layout.

=== Convent and church complex of San Simone ===
San Simone is a church adorned with notable paintings and as a place associated first with the austerity of holy anchorites, then with Stroncone Benedictine cenobites, later with canons, and finally with the Friars Minor Observant. A Gothic church with three naves is noted there, with two rows of travertine columns; attached to it are the ruins of a monastery.

=== Other religious buildings ===
San Benedetto in Fundis is a sacred place farther down on another ridge of the same chain, and was reportedly built by Queen Ansa, wife of Desiderius, the last king of the Lombards.

The Church of San Francesco preserves and venerates the body of Blessed Antonio Vici, patron of the town. The body is reported to have been taken from the Church of San Damiano in Assisi by force in 1809 and brought back to Stroncone.

The church of Sant'Antimo stands on a small, lower hill overlooked by Stroncone.

The collegiate church of San Michele Arcangelo is one of the town’s two parochial collegiate churches and has an organ.

=== Palazzo Comunale ===
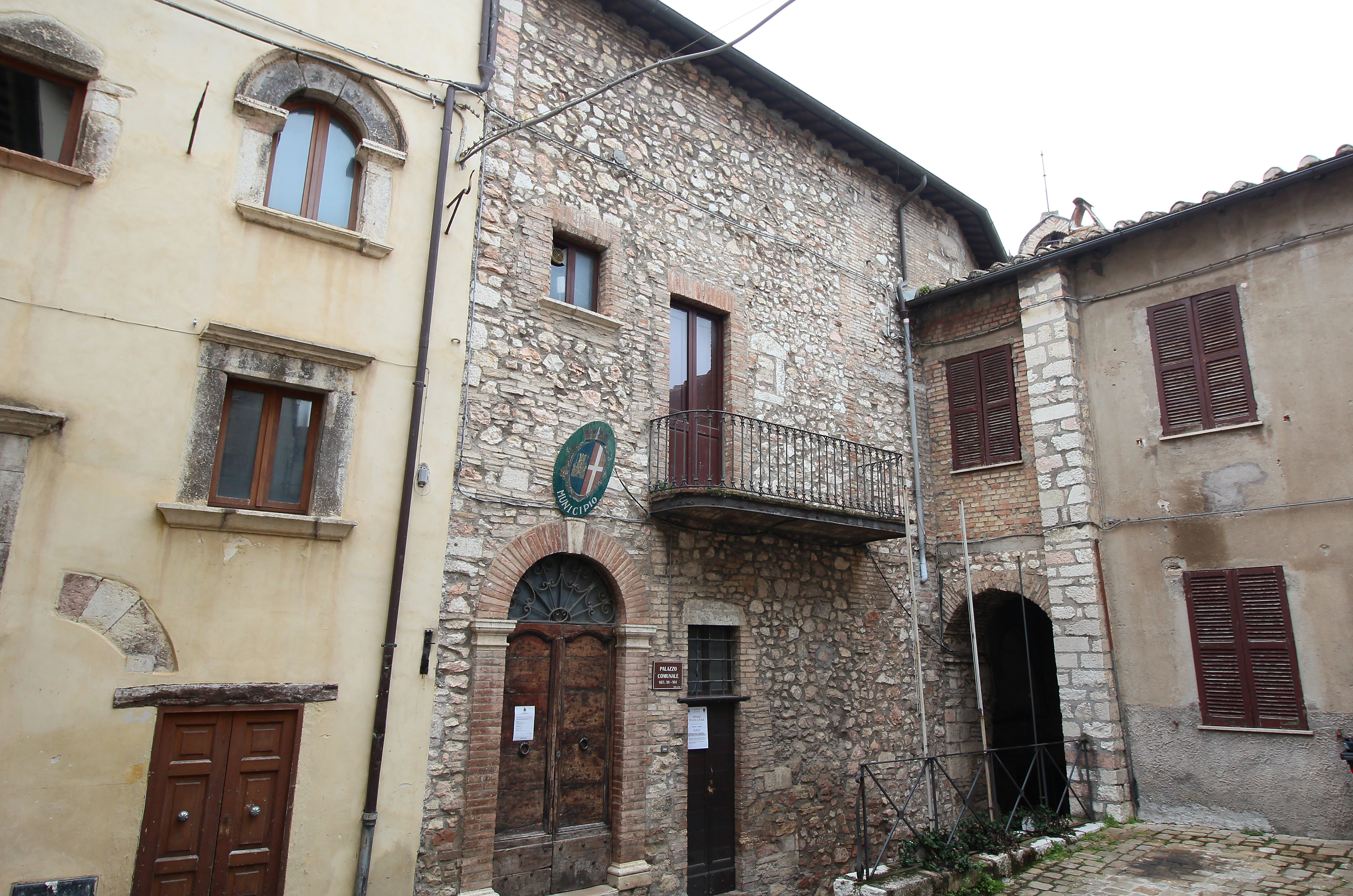
Palazzo Comunale

The Palazzo Comunale, originally known as the Palazzo dei Priori, was likely built in the 13th century and underwent multiple modifications over time. The entrance displays the municipal coat of arms and a commemorative plaque for Cardinal Niccolò Fieschi, governor at the time the doorway was built around 1500.

The upper floor, reached by a stone staircase, contains the former Sala dei Priori, today the council chamber, where the heraldic shields of local patrician families remain. A polychrome wooden statue of Saint Sebastian from the late 15th or early 16th century is preserved in the same room. The mayor’s office houses historical objects including 16th-century voting equipment, a painting of the Madonna and Child, coins, medals, the municipal seal, illuminated choir books, and documents such as the 18th-century municipal statutes and writings by Teodoro Costanzi.

=== Other cultural heritage ===
The Museo di Storia Naturale di Stroncone presents the geological and biological development of the territory through paleontological, mineralogical, and lithological collections.

Other sights include the Santa Lucia Stroncone Astronomical Observatory.

== Notable people ==
Asprilio Pacelli (1570-1623), Baroque composer, born in the hamlet of Vasciano

Among the leading families in the 19th century were the Rosala, noted as the richest; the Count Genuini, noted as the most distinguished; and the Costanzi family.

== See also ==
- 5609 Stroncone
