= Montecchio =

- Comune
- Comune di Montecchio
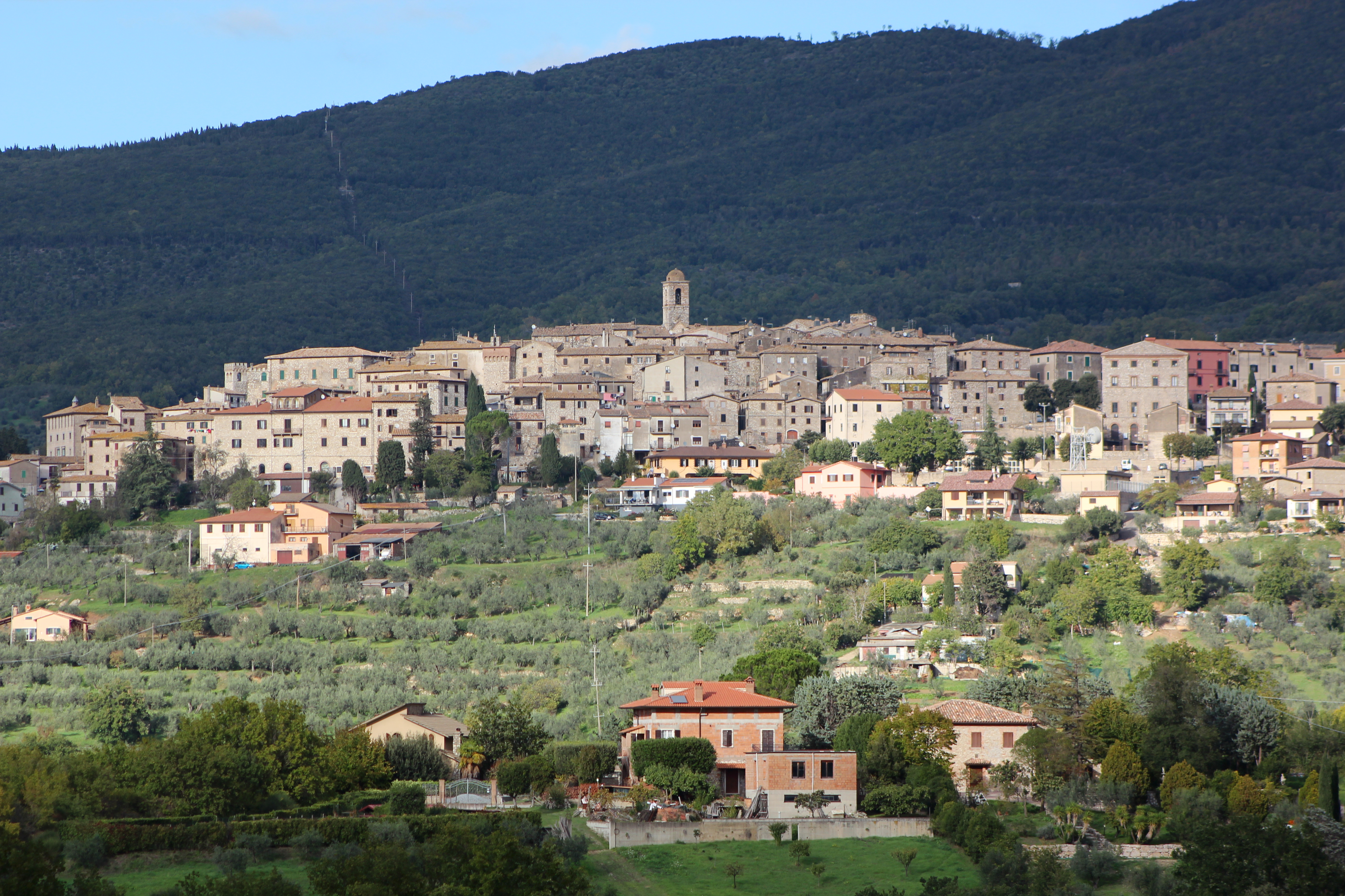
- View of Montecchio

- Coat of arms

- Location within Italy Location within Umbria
- Coordinates: 42.662391°N 12.287062°E
- Country: Italy
- Region: Umbria
- Province: Terni (TR)

Government
  - Mayor: David Lisei

Area
  - Total: 48.9 km^{2} (18.9 sq mi)
- Elevation: 391 m (1,283 ft)

Population (1 January 2025)
  - Total: 1,475
  - Density: 30.2/km^{2} (78.1/sq mi)
- Time zone: UTC+1 (CET)
  - Summer (DST): UTC+2 (CEST)
- Postal code: 05020
- Dialing code: 0744
- Patron saint: St. Bernardino of Siena
- Saint day: May 20
- Website: Official website

Montecchio is a comune (municipality) in the Province of Terni in the Italian region Umbria, located about 50 km south of Perugia and about 30 km northwest of Terni.

It is one of I Borghi più belli d'Italia ("The most beautiful villages of Italy").

== Etymology ==
The name Montecchio is traditionally linked to Mons Herculis. Alternative historical forms include Castro Monticoli, while the name has also been connected to the Latin munticulus, meaning "small hill".

== History ==
The area of Montecchio was already inhabited in prehistoric times, as evidenced by a pre-Roman necropolis in the San Lorenzo valley.

The settlement is first mentioned in written sources in 1154. Around 1165 the original castle nucleus was built by the Chiaravalle family. The castle was originally built as a place of exile during factional conflicts in Todi, when the Guelphs expelled the Ghibellines from the city. The settlement remained historically part of the territory of Todi.

By 1190 a second defensive wall had been constructed, reflecting a growth in population, and in the mid-13th century the fortifications were further expanded.

During the medieval period Montecchio was ruled successively by the Chiaravalle, Alviano, Baschi and Colonna families. In the 16th century it came under the control of the Atti family of Todi, and in 1607 authority passed to the Corsini family.

In the second half of the 16th century local statutes were established.

Following the Papal Restoration in 1814, Montecchio was administratively aligned with the nearby settlement of Baschi. In 1817 it was classified as a dependent district of Baschi.

In the 1850s Montecchio had a population of 738 inhabitants, of whom 601 lived in the town and 137 in the surrounding countryside.

In 1948 Montecchio was separated from Baschi and became an independent municipality.

== Geography ==
Montecchio is located about 5 miles (8.0 km) from Baschi.

Montecchio borders the following municipalities: Avigliano Umbro, Baschi, Civitella d'Agliano, Guardea, Orvieto, Todi.

=== Subdivisions ===
The municipality includes the localities of Fratta, Le Case, Melezzole, Monastero, Montecchio, Pantanelli, Pozzociolino, Pranzuto, Prato Giardino, San Martino, San Rocco, Schiasciarelle, Tenaglie.

In 2021, 367 people lived in rural dispersed dwellings not assigned to any named locality. At the time, most of the population lived in Montecchio proper (671), and Melezzole (159).

== Economy ==
The production facilities of the Falesco winery are located there.

== Religion and culture ==
=== Castle of Carnano ===
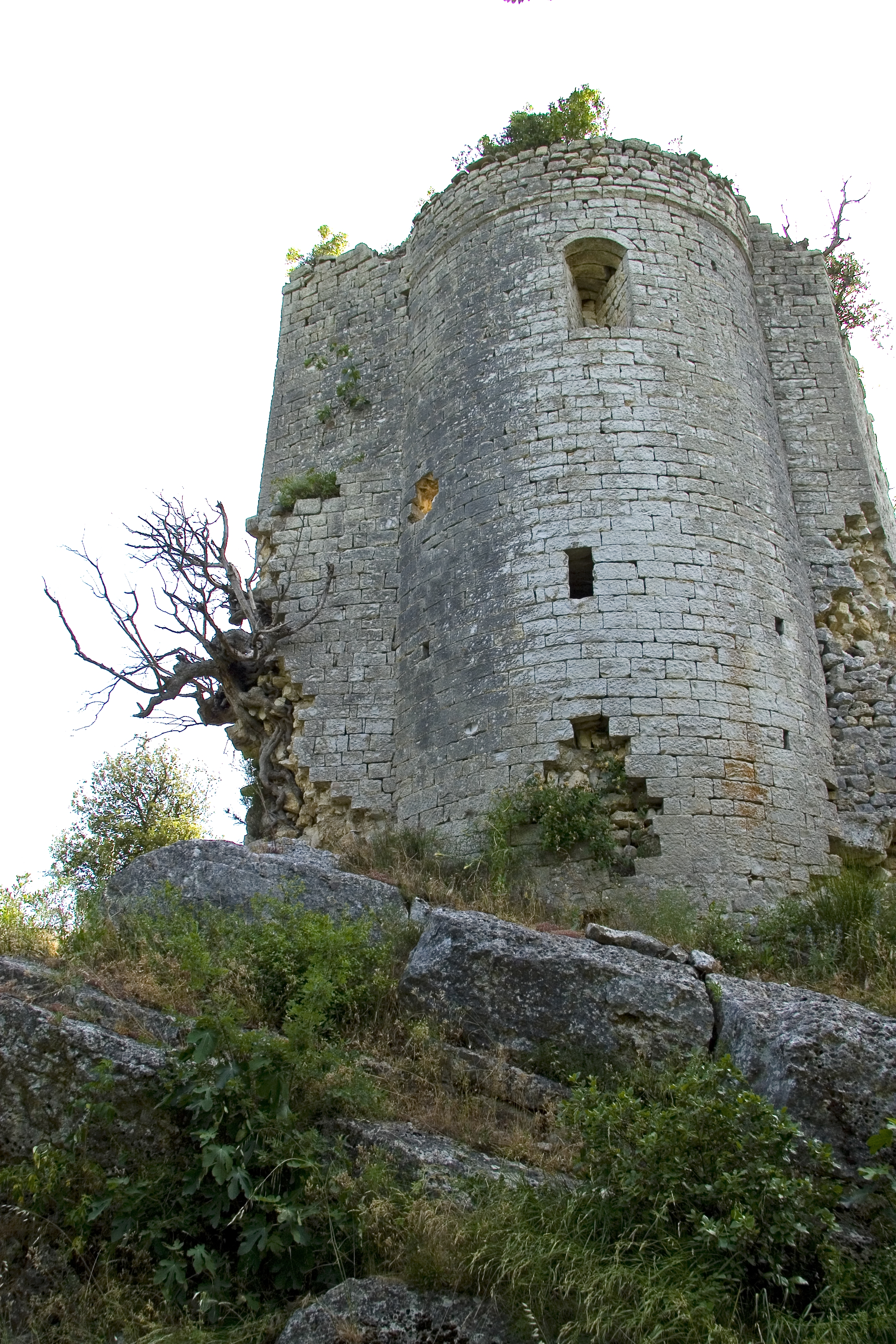
Apse of the church ruins in Carnano

The Castle of Carnano stood near the Abbey of Sant'Andrea, of which little is known. Established around the year 1000, it occupied a dominant position over the Tiber Valley on a rocky spur, as reflected in the early Romanesque masonry of the church of Santa Maria. The castle is depicted intact in a 1583 map by Ignazio Danti, but already shown in ruins in a 1585 plan after its destruction in 1553, ordered by Pope Julius III to punish the Baschi counts. The site was razed along with the abbey, and today only ruins remain, including parts of the apse, an altar, a cistern, and sections of collapsed walls.

=== Necropolis of San Lorenzo ===
The necropolis of San Lorenzo is an Etruscan burial site dating from the 6th to the 4th centuries BC. The settlement to which the necropolis belonged is still unknown. It may have been one of the castella mentioned by Livy, small outposts of the city of Orvieto-Velzna near the edge of its territory, close to the border with the Umbrian-Italic world. The frequent discovery of pottery and brick fragments from different periods on the plain of Copio, which overlooks the gorges of San Lorenzo and the Raiano ditch, suggests that the settlement may have stood there. Based on these finds, its date would match that of the necropolis, between the 6th and 4th centuries BC.

A Roman rural settlement later covered the site, as shown by finds of common ware and terra sigillata from the early imperial period.

If confirmed, the settlement held a strategic position near the Tiber and the roads linking Tuder and Ameria. This made the area around the river a meeting point between the Etruscan and Umbrian-Italic worlds and increased its importance and economic value, at least until the decline of Orvieto-Velzna and the spread of Roman control.

The tombs stretch along the slopes descending toward the stream, on different levels and likely beside roads running along their edges. They are chamber tombs cut into the ground. In most cases, they are preceded by a slightly sloping dromos, closed by a travertine entrance slab. The burial chamber is rectangular, with a flat or slightly sloping ceiling, and has benches carved from the same material along the sides and back, used to place bodies and grave goods. In some cases, tombs are built one above another, which may reflect either different periods of construction or a lack of space. Other tombs follow a different layout, with two rooms in sequence connected by a doorway, based on models from southern Etruria. Their structure, and especially the grave goods, point to a date ranging from the late 7th or early 6th century BC for the earliest burials to the 4th century BC for the latest.

Excavations of the tombs along the San Lorenzo ditch produced a large number of grave goods, although some had been disturbed by repeated illegal digging over the years. The types of objects and their quality point to a society with strong economic and cultural resources, linked to nearby Orvieto-Velzna and clearly shaped by Etruscan ways of life. Bronze tools made both in that city and in central and southern Etruria, together with imported pottery, especially Attic ware that arrived through Volsinian trade, suggest a high standard of living.

Among the metal finds were tools used for preparing and cooking food and for banquets, which are common in Etruscan and Italic burials of higher social groups. Among the ceramics, many Attic kylikes were found; although not of especially high quality, they still show the circulation of expensive goods. Bucchero ware and painted Etruscan ceramics from the Orvieto Group were also found in large numbers and were made in the Volsinian area. Several storage jars for provisions, found in one of the tombs, point to successful farming and trade among the local population. The presence, though limited, of jewelry in precious metals and containers for ointments and cosmetics suggests a prosperous female population, who may have held important social roles.
