= Santa Lucia Stroncone Astronomical Observatory =

Astronomical observatory in Umbria, north central Italy

Coordinates: 42°30′55″N 12°38′24″E

Minor planets discovered: 55
see § List of discovered minor planets

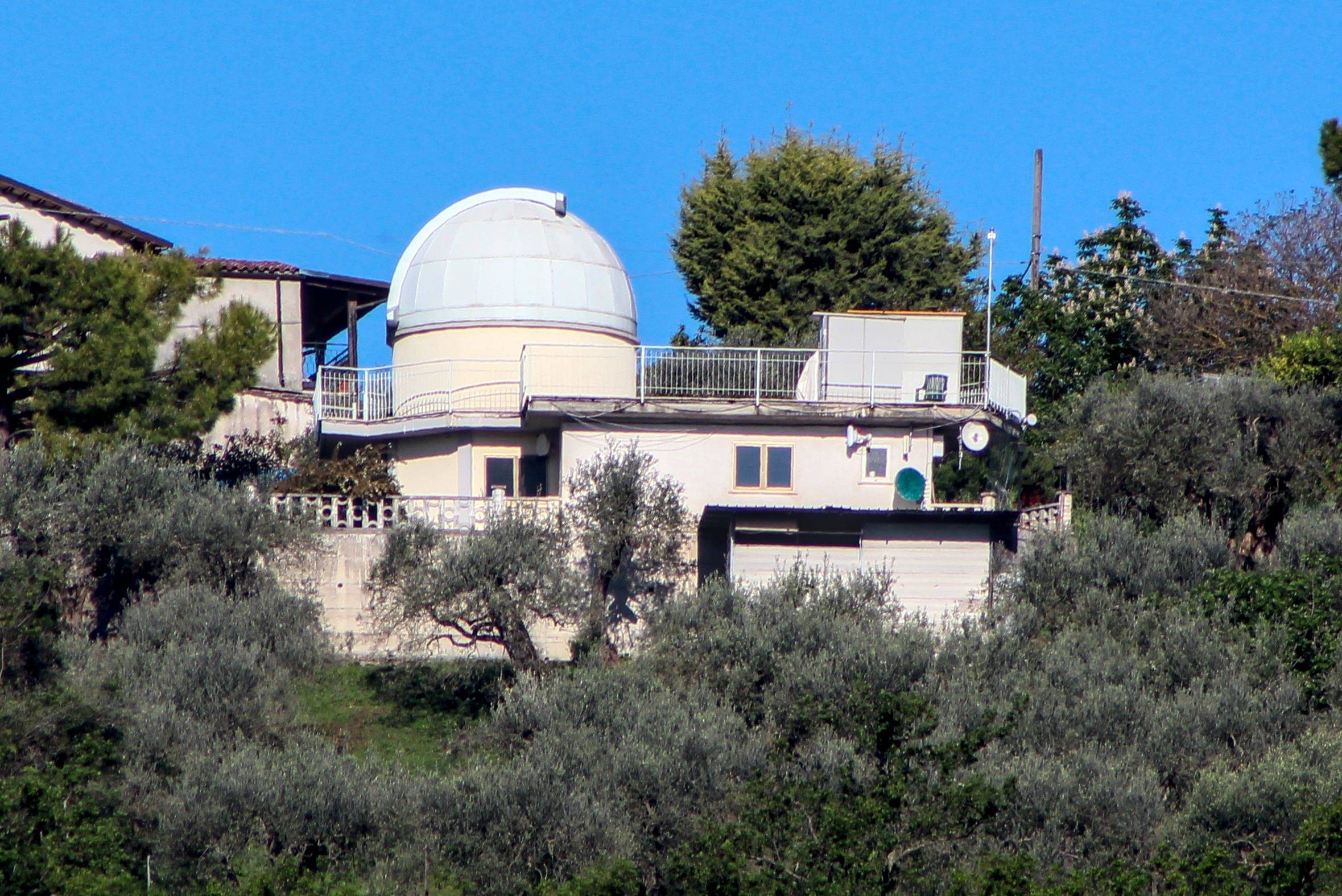
The Santa Lucia Stroncone Astronomical Observatory in Santa Lucia, hamlet of Stroncone

The Santa Lucia Stroncone Astronomical Observatory (Italian: Osservatorio Astrometrico Santa Lucia Stroncone) is an astronomical observatory located at 350 metres (1,150 ft) altitude in Stroncone, near the city of Terni, in Umbria, north central Italy.

It is an active center for the discovery of asteroids. Stroncone is also known as IAU/MPC observatory 589. It is located at longitude 12º38'24"E, latitude 42º30'55"N.

The main-belt asteroid 5609 Stroncone, discovered by amateur astronomer Antonio Vagnozzi at Stroncone in 1993, was named after the suburb where the discovering observatory is located.

== List of discovered minor planets ==
6835 Molfino	30 April 1994	list
6923 Borzacchini	16 September 1993	list
7030 Colombini	18 December 1993	list
7132 Casulli	17 September 1993	list
7258 Pettarin	5 March 1994	list
7260 Metelli	18 March 1994	list
7306 Panizon	6 March 1994	list
7356 Casagrande	27 September 1995	list
7531 Pecorelli	24 September 1994	list
7680 Cari	16 April 1996	list
7714 Briccialdi	9 February 1996	list
7782 Mony	7 February 1994	list
7790 Miselli	28 February 1995	list
7963 Falcinelli	1 February 1995	list
8112 Cesi	3 May 1995	list
8192 Tonucci	10 September 1993	list
8193 Ciaurro	17 September 1993	list
8230 Perona	8 October 1997	list
8555 Mirimao	3 June 1995	list
8897 Defelice	22 September 1995	list

9397 Lombardi	6 September 1994	list
10573 Piani	29 November 1994	list
11600 Cipolla	26 September 1995	list
11977 Leonrisoldi	19 July 1995	list
12442 Beltramemass	23 February 1996	list
19306 Voves	12 October 1996	list
21192 Seccisergio	2 July 1994	list
21662 Benigni	1 September 1999	list
(24047) 1999 TD_{6}	6 October 1999	list
(24160) 1999 VS_{207}	9 November 1999	list
29561 Iatteri	21 February 1998	list
(32921) 1995 EV	9 March 1995	list
(33066) 1997 VS_{6}	3 November 1997	list
33135 Davidrisoldi	19 February 1998	list
(37906) 1998 FR_{73}	28 March 1998	list
39677 Anagaribaldi	13 March 1996	list
(40725) 1999 SP_{9}	30 September 1999	list
43841 Marcustacitus	17 April 1993	list
(44368) 1998 SR_{26}	23 September 1998	list
(48810) 1997 VA_{7}	14 November 1997	list

(55808) 1994 RN	7 September 1994	list
(65762) 1994 RG	4 September 1994	list
(65882) 1997 YR_{8}	28 December 1997	list
(65966) 1998 HH_{8}	24 April 1998	list
(74021) 1998 HP_{1}	19 April 1998	list
(79242) 1994 RE	3 September 1994	list
(85588) 1998 FA_{15}	25 March 1998	list
(96382) 1998 BW_{7}	22 January 1998	list
(100296) 1995 FB	21 March 1995	list
(121334) 1999 TQ_{3}	3 October 1999	list
(129608) 1997 YQ_{8}	24 December 1997	list
(145728) 1994 RO	7 September 1994	list
(159381) 1998 FB	16 March 1998	list
(192332) 1995 FA	21 March 1995	list
(356975) 1994 TX_{1}	9 October 1994	list

== See also ==
- List of asteroid-discovering observatories
- List of astronomical observatories
- List of minor planet discoverers § Discovering dedicated institutions
- List of observatory codes
