= Province of Terni =

Province of Italy

Coordinates: 42°34′N 12°39′E

Province of Terni Provincia di Terni (Italian)
- Province
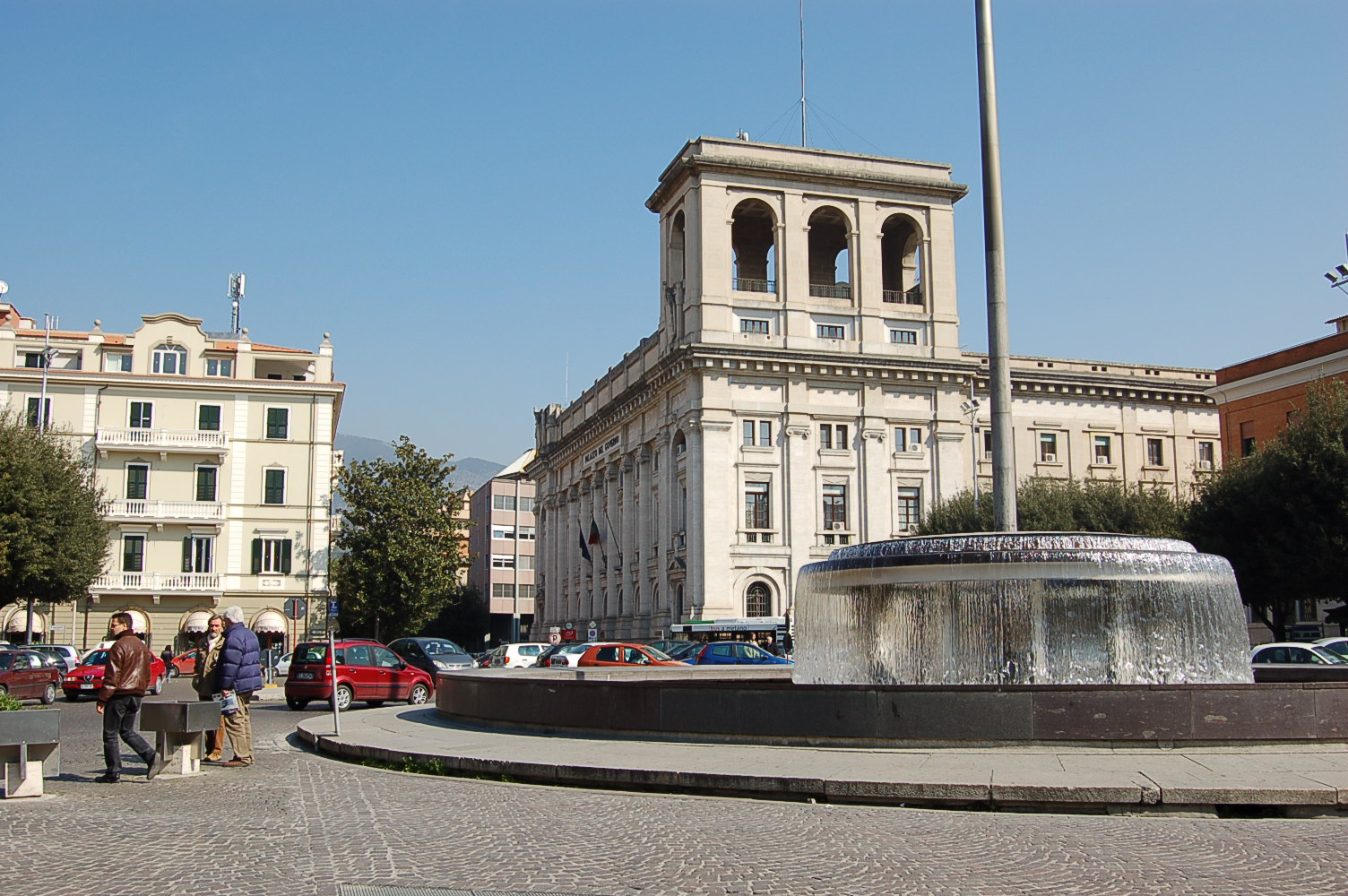
- Palazzo Bazzani, the provincial seat

- Flag Coat of arms

- Location of the province of Terni in Italy
- Country: Italy
- Region: Umbria
- Capital(s): Terni
- Municipalities: 33

Government
  - President: Stefano Bandecchi

Area
  - Total: 2,127.18 km^{2} (821.31 sq mi)

Population (2026)
  - Total: 214,639
  - Density: 100.903/km^{2} (261.338/sq mi)

GDP
  - Total: €5.030 billion (2015)
  - Per capita: €21,885 (2015)
- Time zone: UTC+1 (CET)
  - Summer (DST): UTC+2 (CEST)
- Postal code: 05010-05018, 05020-05026, 05028-05032, 05034-05035, 05039, 05100
- Telephone prefix: 075, 0744, 0763
- Vehicle registration: TR
- ISTAT: 055

The province of Terni (Italian: provincia di Terni) is the smaller of the two provinces in the region of Umbria in central Italy, comprising one-third of both the area and population of the region. Its capital is the city of Terni. The province was established in 1927, when it was carved out of the original unitary province of Umbria.

It has a population of 214,639 in an area of 2,127.18 square kilometres (821.31 sq mi). The only towns with a population over 10,000 are Terni, Orvieto, Narni and Amelia.

== History ==
In the 2nd millennium BC the province was occupied by a population called Umbri, who founded the cities of Amelia, Narnia Nahars, Otricolum and Interamna Nahars. With the development of the Etruscan civilization, their territory was reduced to the valleys of the Black and Velino. One of the most important and richest Etruscan cities in province of Terni was Orvieto and an unidentified place called Fanum Voltumnae. For centuries, Umbrian and Etruscan fought hard for the rule of the Tiber Valley, until, in 299 BC when Roman legions began the invasion of Umbria.

The provincial territory was part of the Roman Republic and then the Roman Empire until the latter's western part fell in the 5th century AD. In 571 the Lombards, after invading the Po Plain, went down the Apennines and, in 575, founded the Duchy of Spoleto in what is now Umbria and the neighbouring areas; this state remained formally independent until 1250. In 1527 Terni was used a camp of the Landsknecht army that would subsequently take part in the Sack of Rome and fought at Spoleto and Todi, where the League of Cognac troops were located.

In 1926, it became the seat of a separate province, detached from Perugia, including the countryside around the main centres of Terni and Orvieto.

== Geography ==
It is bordered to the north with the province of Perugia, to the east, south and west with the Lazio (province of Rieti and province of Viterbo) and to north-west with the Tuscany (province of Siena). The province extends into the south-west of the Umbria region, occupying the last section of the Nera Valley near the confluence with the River Velino, and the eastern part of the valley of the Tiber Valley.

The province of Terni is characterized by its slopes encountered along the path of rivers, allowing the exploitation of hydro catchment areas, so as to have led to the creation of several artificial lakes:

- Lake Corbara
- Lake Alviano
- Lake Recentino
- Lake San Liberato
- Lake Arezzo
- Lake Piediluco

=== Municipalities ===
There are 33 municipalities in the province.

- Acquasparta
- Allerona
- Alviano
- Amelia
- Arrone
- Attigliano
- Avigliano Umbro
- Baschi
- Calvi dell'Umbria
- Castel Giorgio
- Castel Viscardo
- Fabro
- Ferentillo
- Ficulle
- Giove
- Guardea
- Lugnano in Teverina
- Montecastrilli
- Montecchio
- Montefranco
- Montegabbione
- Monteleone d'Orvieto
- Narni
- Orvieto
- Otricoli
- Parrano
- Penna in Teverina
- Polino
- Porano
- San Gemini
- San Venanzo
- Stroncone
- Terni

== Demographics ==
Historical population
Year	Pop.	±%
1861	102,553	—
1871	111,227	+8.5%
1881	117,961	+6.1%
1901	148,664	+26.0%
1911	155,527	+4.6%
1921	164,500	+5.8%
1931	177,222	+7.7%
1936	191,559	+8.1%
1951	222,595	+16.2%
1961	224,596	+0.9%
1971	222,847	−0.8%
1981	226,564	+1.7%
1991	223,050	−1.6%
2001	219,876	−1.4%
2011	228,424	+3.9%
2021	218,330	−4.4%
Source: ISTAT

As of 2026, the population is 214,639, of which 48.5% are male, and 51.5% are female. Minors make up 12.7% of the population, and seniors make up 29.4%.

=== Immigration ===
As of 2025, immigrants make up 13.0% of the population. The 5 largest foreign countries of birth are Romania, Albania, Ukraine, India, and Moldova.

== Gallery ==
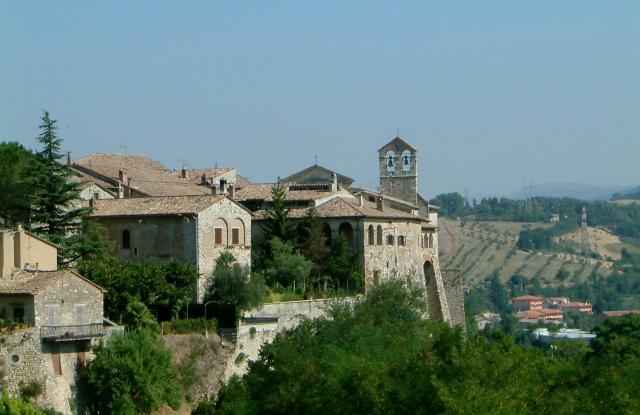
San Gemini

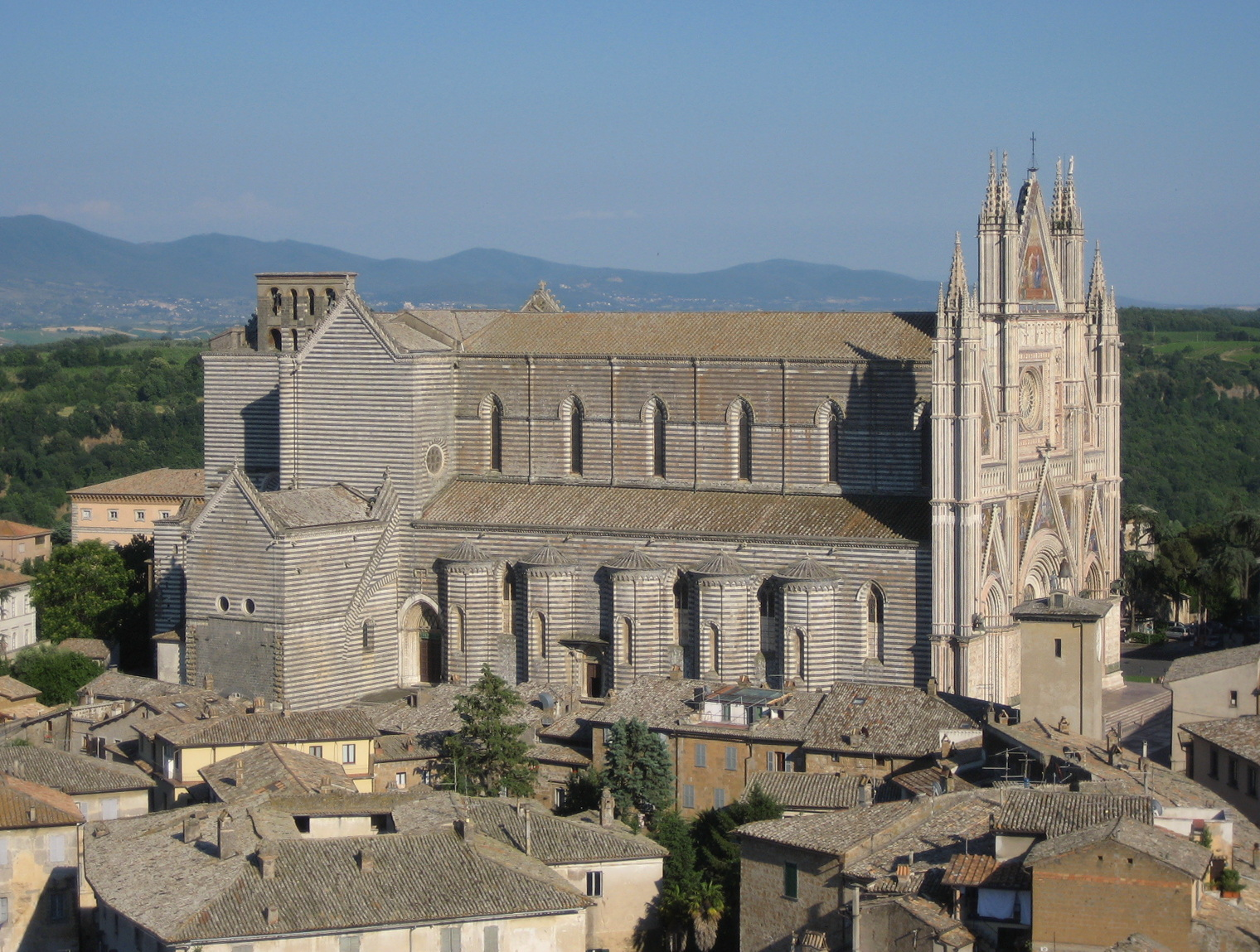
The Orvieto Cathedral

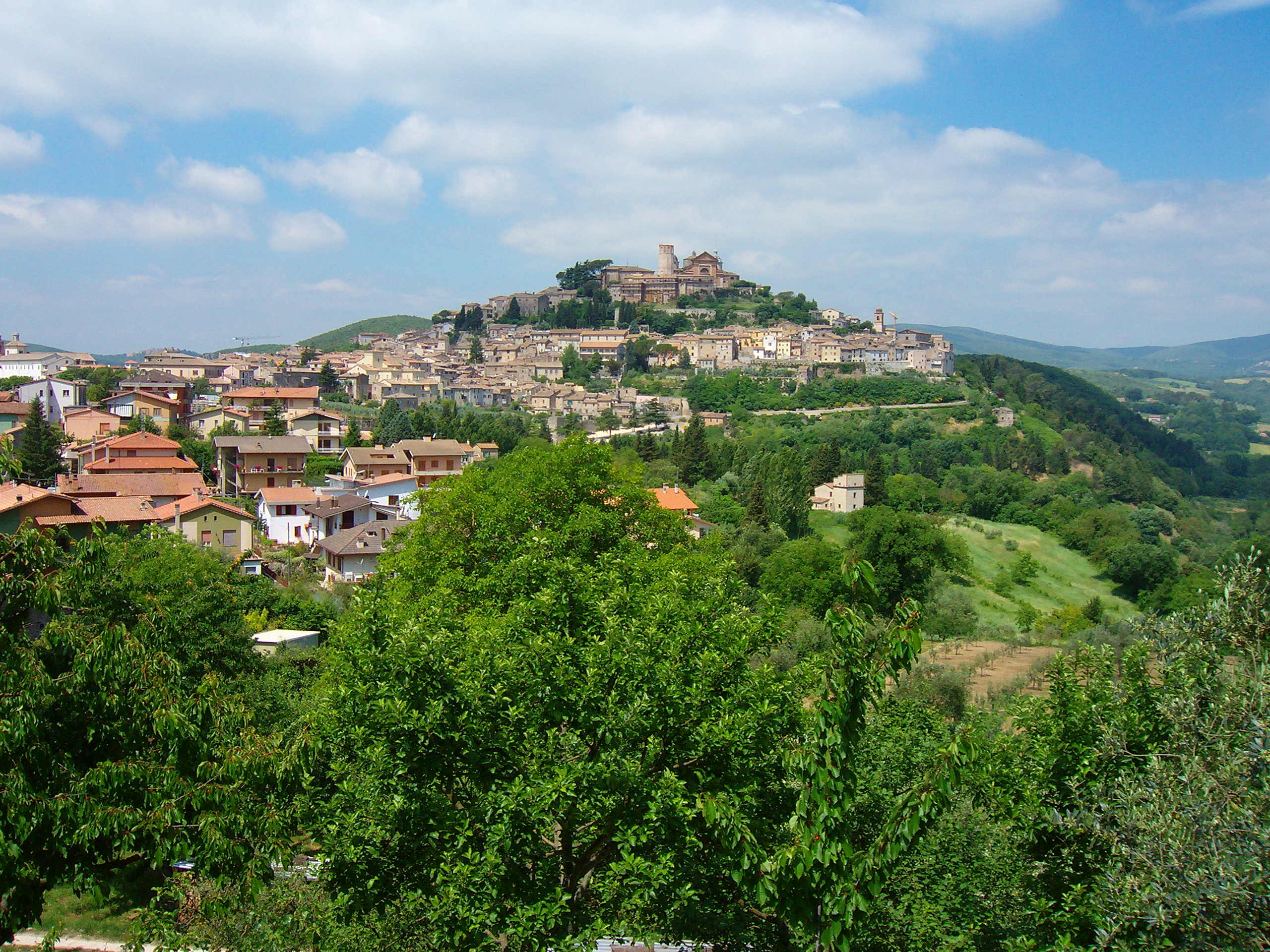
Amelia

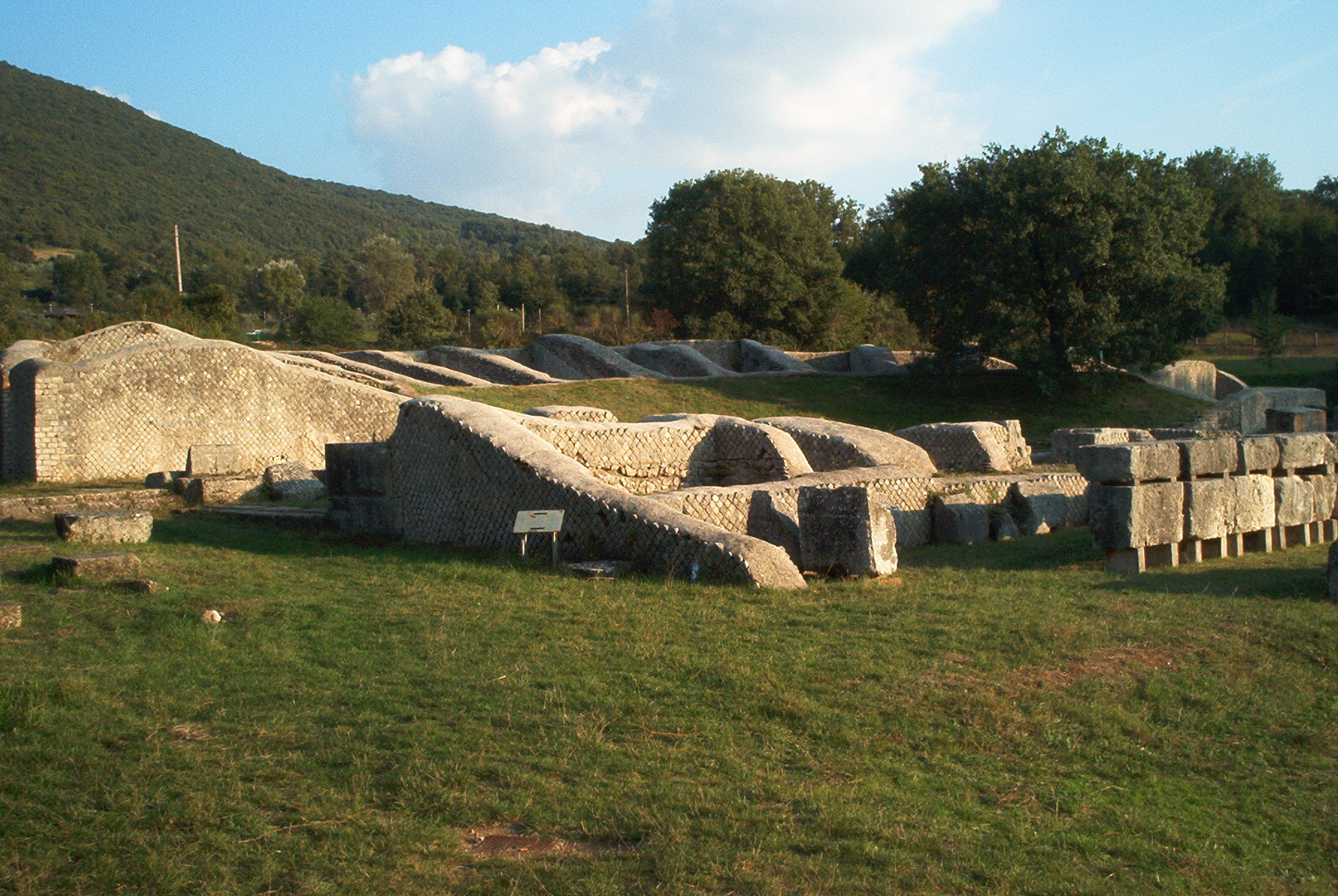
Ancient theater of Carsulae

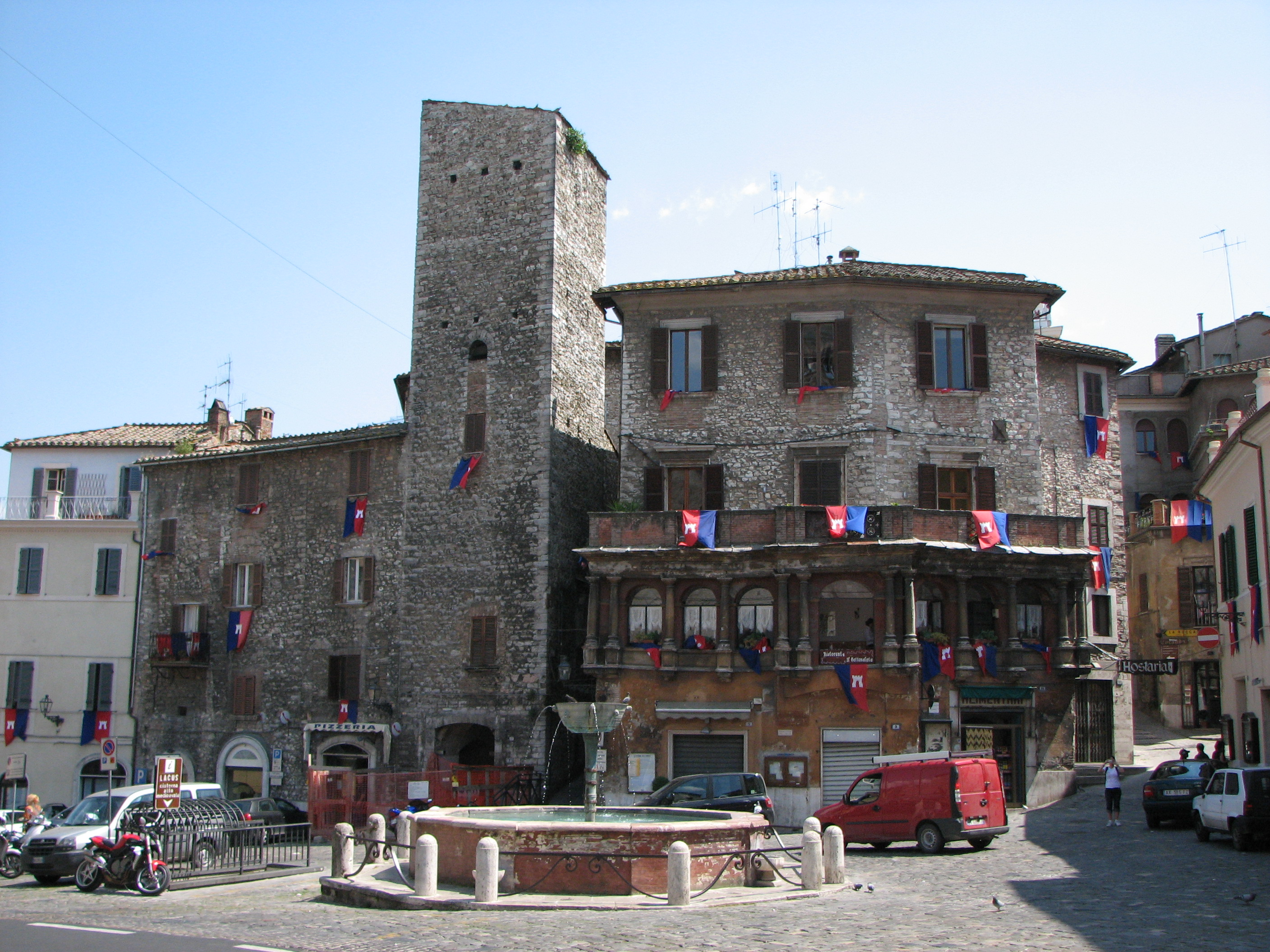
Central Square in Narni

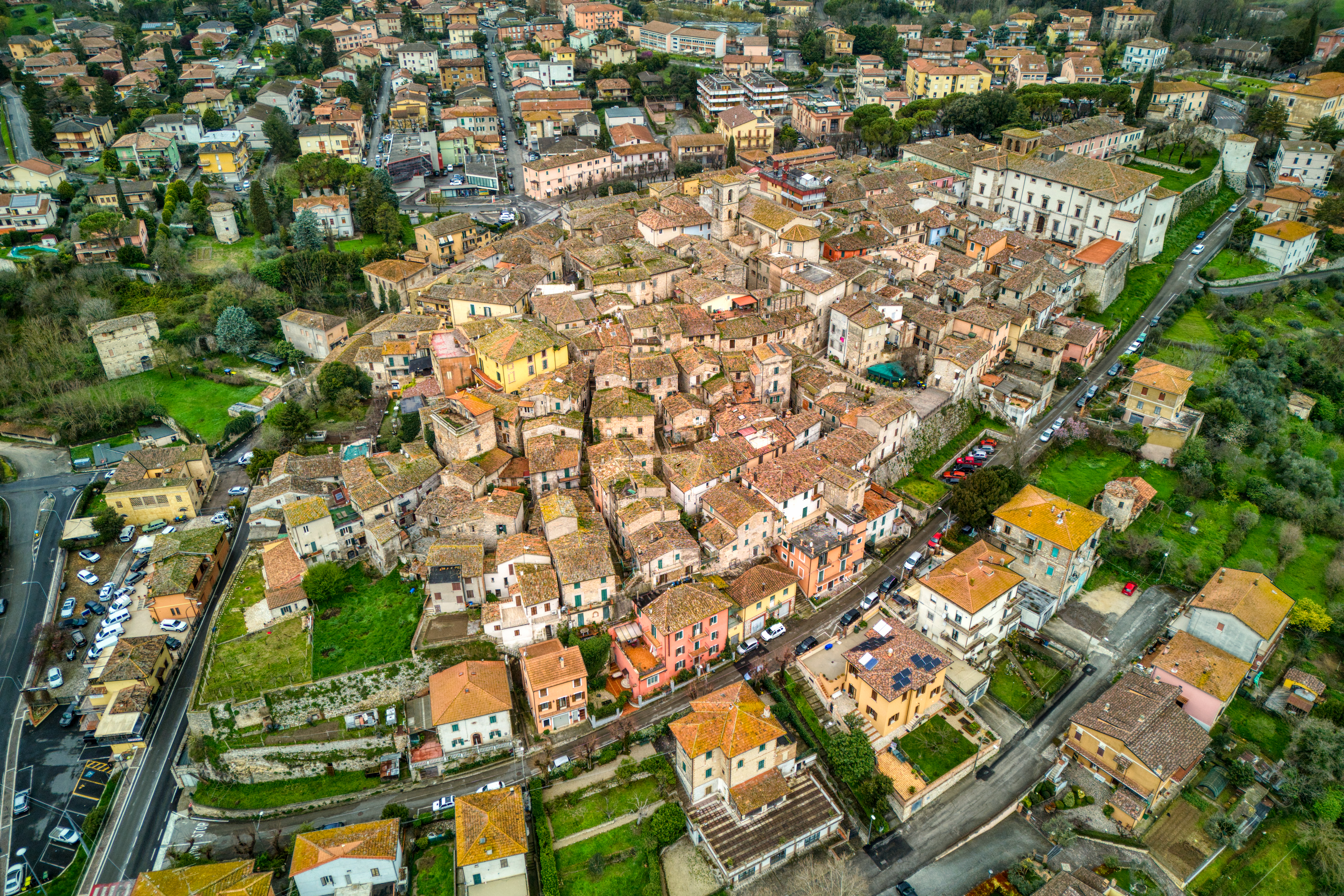
Acquasparta

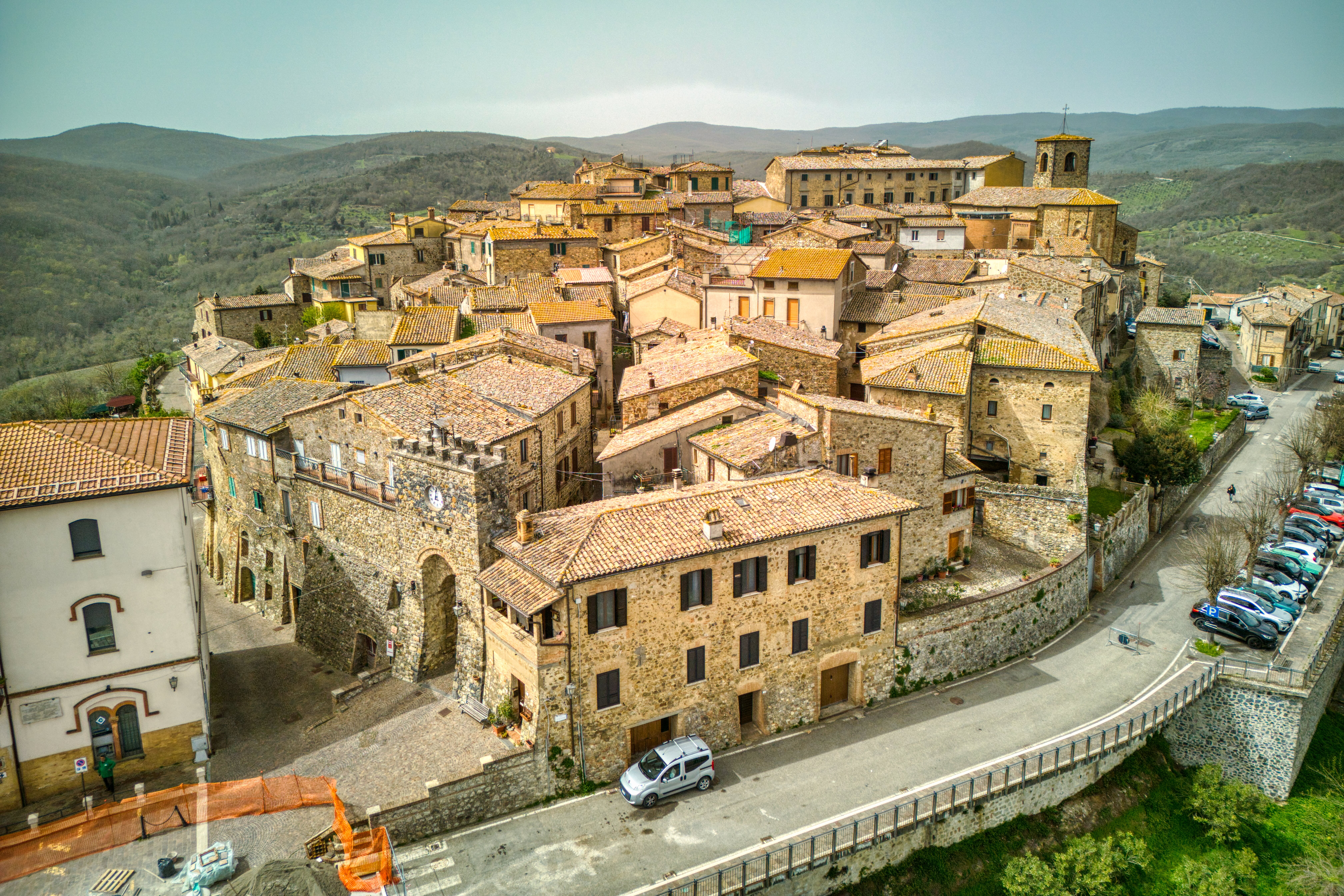
Allerona

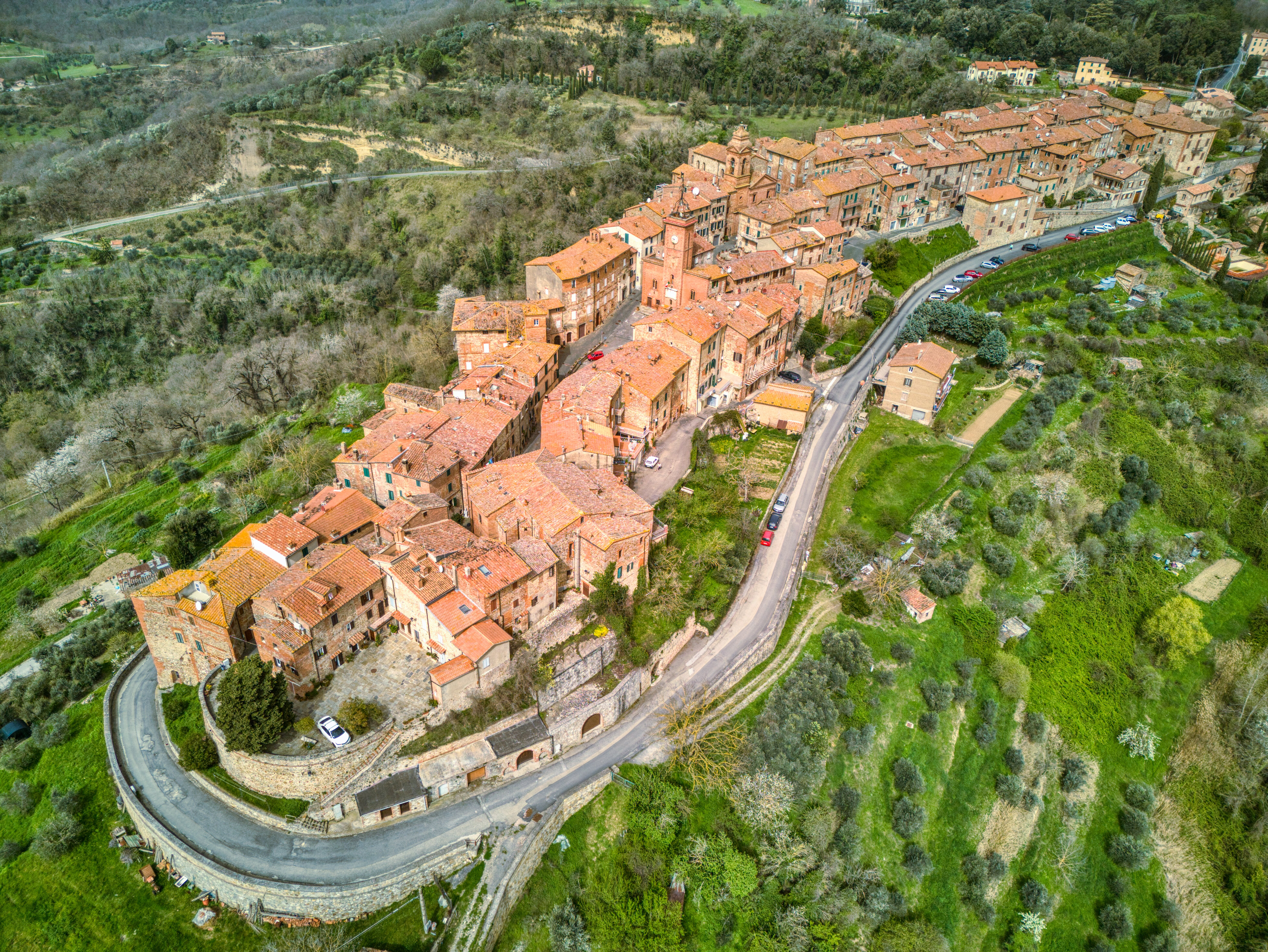
Monteleone d'Orvieto

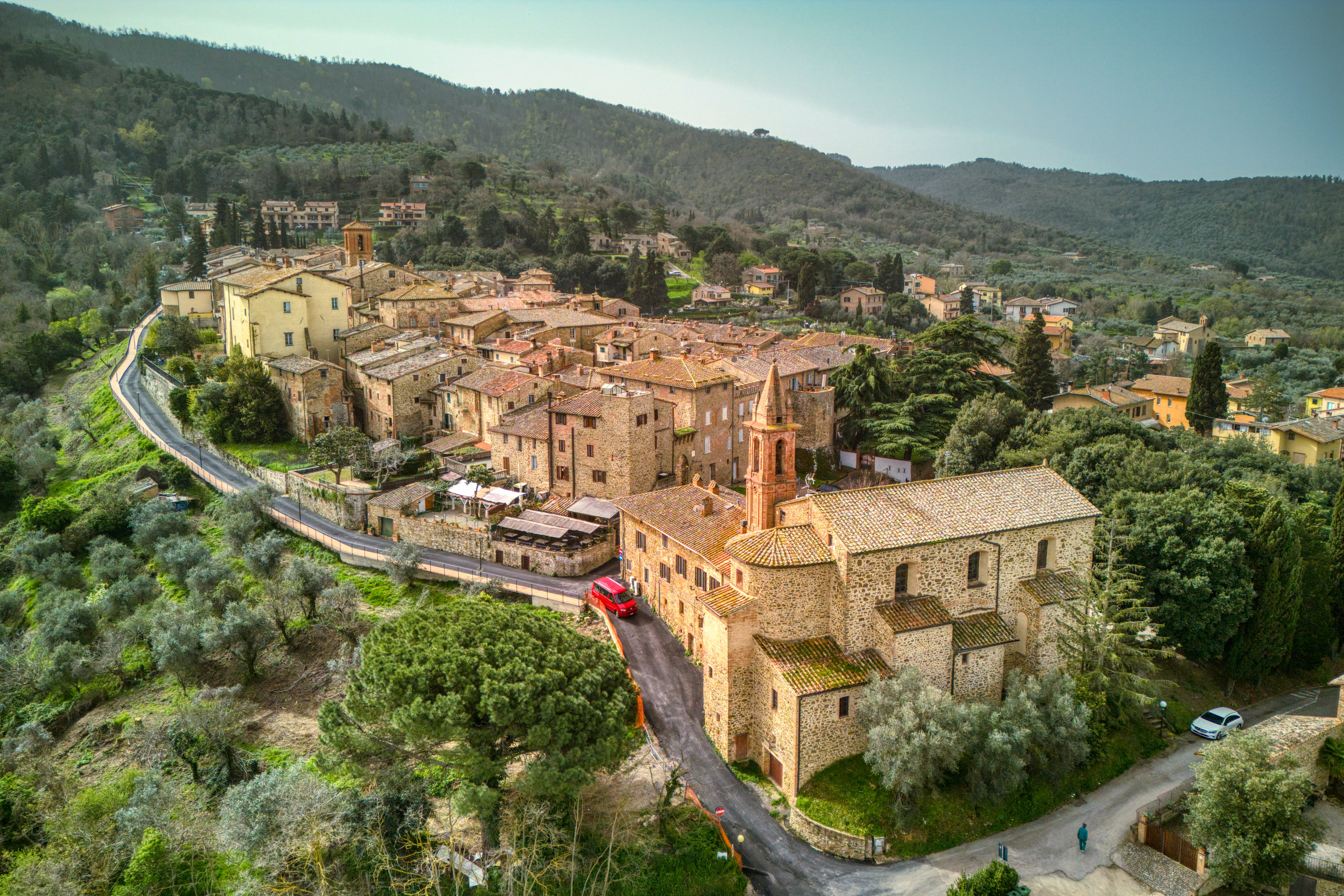
Paciano

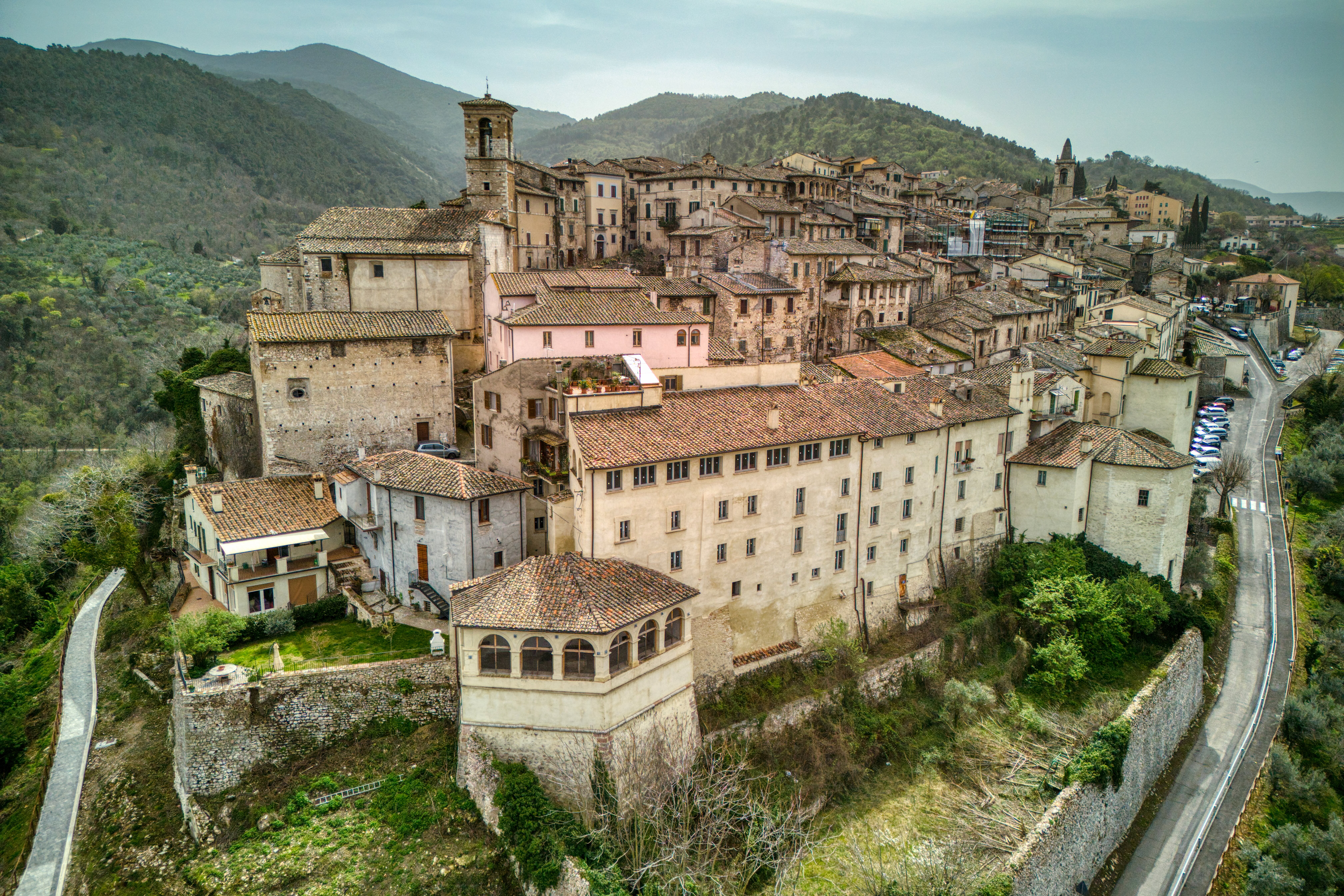
Stroncone

== See also ==
- Lake Arezzo
