= Corsini =

Corsini is an Italian surname.

The Corsini family is a princely Florentine family. The emperor Charles IV created the head of the house a count palatine in 1371; the marquisate of Sismano was conferred on them in 1620, those of Casigliano and Civitella in 1629, of Lajatico and Orciatico in 1644, of Giovagallo and Tresana in 1652. In 1730 Lorenzo Corsini, as pope, conferred the rank of Roman princes and the duchy of Casigliano on his family, and in 1732 they were created grandees of Spain.

- Andrea Corsini (cardinal) (1707–1795)
- Saint Andrew Corsini (1302–1373), friar and Bishop Fiesole
- Pope Clement XII (1652–1740), born Lorenzo Corsini
- Neri Corsini (fl. 1170), founder of the Corsini family
- Neri Corsini (died 1377), bishop of Fiesole from 1374 to 1377, see War of the Eight Saints
- Neri Corsini (1614–1678), cardinal from 1664 onwards
- Neri Maria Corsini (1685–1770), nephew of Pope Clement XII, made cardinal by his uncle 1730

Other people with the surname Corsini:

- Bruno Henrique Corsini, simply known as Bruno Henrique (born 1989), Brazilian professional footballer
- Catherine Corsini (born 1956), French film director
- Claudia Corsini (born 1977), Italian Olympic pentathlete
- Filippo Corsini (1873–1926), Italian Liberal Party politician
- Giulio Corsini (1933–2009), Italian professional football player and coach
- Harold Corsini (1919–2008), American photographer
- Ignacio Corsini (1891–1967), Italian-born Argentine folklore and tango musician
- Ludovico Corsini (born 1993), Italian Mozambican swimmer specializing in breaststroke
- Maria Corsini (1884–1965), Italian writer, beatified by Pope John Paul II on 2001
- Miriam Corsini (born 1989), Mozambican swimmer specializing in breaststroke
- Raymond "Ray" J. Corsini (1914–2008), encyclopedist and lexicographer in the field of psychology
- Tommaso Corsini (1835–1919), Italian politician

== See also ==
- Palazzo Corsini, Rome
- Palazzo Corsini, Florence
