= Jacopo Zoboli =

Italian painter (1681–1767)

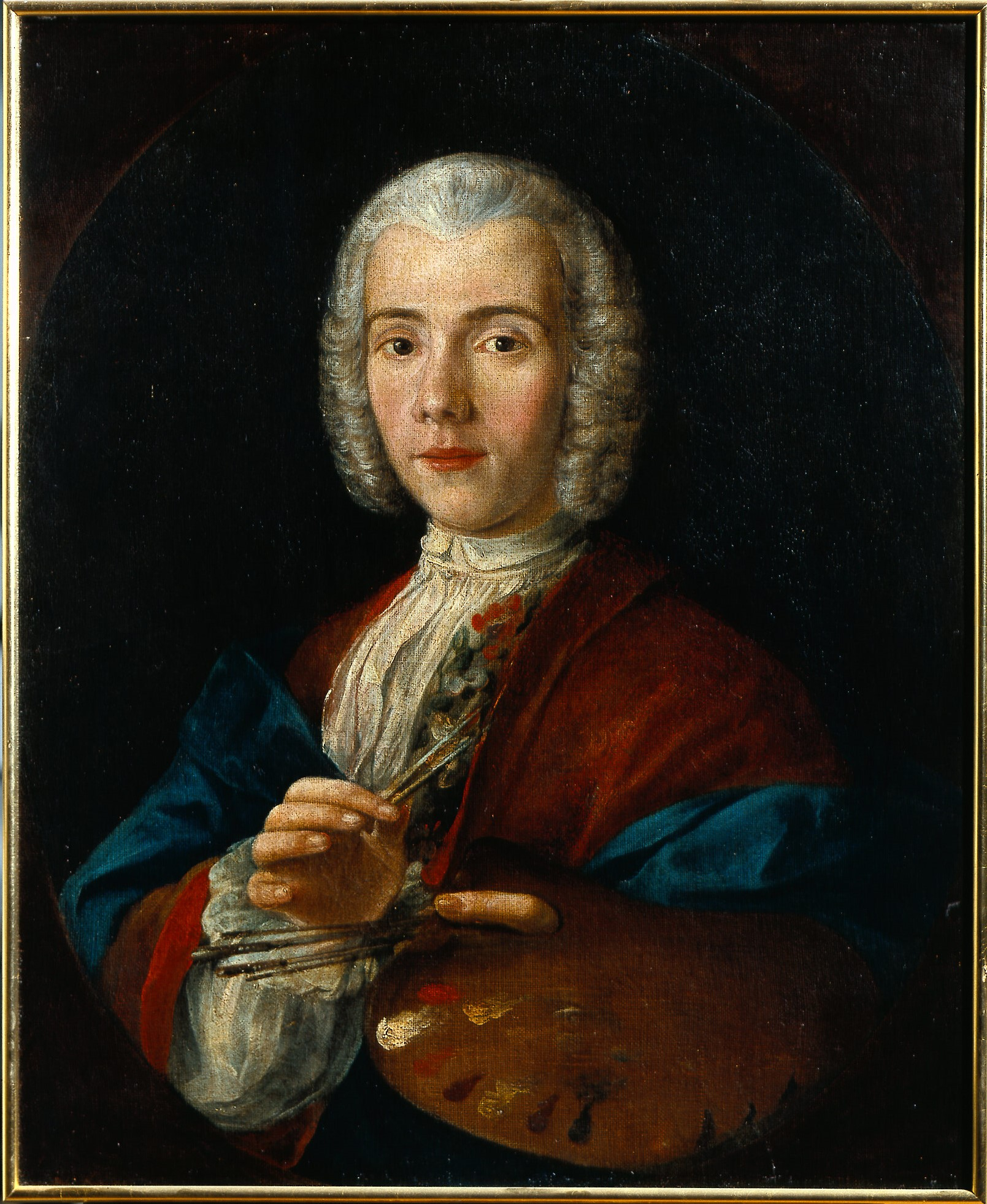
- Self portrait
- Born: 23 May 1681; Modena, Modena and Reggio
- Died: February 23, 1767 (aged 85); Rome, Papal States
- Movement: Baroque
- Parent(s): Giambattista Zoboli; Lucrezia Panara

Jacopo Zoboli, also known by Giacomo, (23 May 1681 – 23 February 1767) was an Italian painter of the Baroque style.

== Biography ==
Jacopo was born in Modena, son of Giambattista Zoboli and Lucrezia Panara. Following an initial apprenticeship with Francesco Stringa, he briefly relocated to Bologna where he studied under Giovan Sole from 1701 to 1707. Upon returning to Modena, he worked on the frescoes of Ducal Palace of Modena from 1707 to 1712, initially under the supervision of Stringa, and following that master's death, under the guidance of Jacopino Consetti. He then moved to Rome in 1712 or 1713, where he resided until his death. Zoboli was enrolled as member of the Accademia dei Virtuosi al Pantheon in 1718 and subsequently the Accademia di San Luca on 2 September 1725, during the period when the painter Giuseppe Chiari was prince of the academy. Zoboli was honored with the title of "Academic of Honor" by the Accademia Clementina of Bologna and was friend and collaborator of Sebastiano Conca, a leading painter in 18th century Rome.

From 1718 to 1735, he lived in palazzo Petroni in Piazza del Gesù, within the residence of the ambassador of the Duchy of Modena and Reggio, located in Rome. Zoboli's workshop not far from the residence, in the premises of Palazzo Venezia, hosted by Angelo Querini (his presence at this Palazzo is documented since at least 1727). From 1738 to 1760, Zoboli lived and worked on the second floor of Palazzo Farnese, thanks to cardinal Neri Corsini, the nephew of Pope Clement XII. He then moved to Palazzo Savelli Orsini on Via Monte Savello in the territory of the (then) parish of the Basilica of San Nicola in Carcere.

In August 1718, Zoboli joined the Archconfraternity of the Sacred Stigmata of St. Francis, a group celebrating the miracle of the Santissime Stimmate di San Francesco. Zoboli participated in these gatherings until his death. In 1724, Zoboli painted the Death of Caesar for the noble family of the Marquises Rangoni of Modena. For several scholars, including Rudolph, Zoboli "painted works that show a surprising anticipation of Neoclassicism of the second half of the 18th century", and thus was an early exponent of this move away from the Baroque. For Vittorio Casale, Zoboli expressed a "conscious proto-neoclassicism" and interpreted his aesthetic ideals of a rationalistic Arcadia "opposed to the effusions of the Baroque".

Zoboli was active primarily in Rome for both ecclesiastical and private commissions, encouraged by Cardinal Neri Corsini. In 1727, he painted the Encounter between the Holy Virgin and Elizabeth for the Basilica of Sant'Eustachio. Two years later, for the same Basilica, Zoboli painted St Jerome listening to the trumpet of the Last Judgment, which was much appreciated by his contemporaries, and made him famous even outside the capital. Outside of Rome, his most significant paintings are found in Modena and Brescia. In 1732, Bishop and Cardinal Angelo Querini commissioned the main altarpiece of the Cathedral of Santa Maria Assunta being built for Brescia. The positive acclaim of this altarpiece led the Philippine Fathers of Peace, in 1742 to commission Zoboli in 1742 to paint the main altarpiece for their church, then under construction: the painting depicts Saint Philip Neri, founder of the Congregation of the Oratorians. Completed in Rome in 1745 and placed on the second altar of the right aisle of the Church of Santa Maria della Pace in Brescia.

In 1745, he painted Triumph of Faith for the Monastery of the Holy Cross in Coimbra, Portugal. In 1748, Zoboli then created The Assumption of Mary for the church of Santa Maria degli Angeli in Brescia, annexed to the convent of the Augustinian nuns of Brescia. Also famous is the work depicting Saint Francis of Sales and Blessed Joan Frances de Chantal, located in the Visitation Monastery in Madrid. Commissioned by the Spanish queen Maria Barbara of Braganza, wife of Ferdinand VI of Spain, the piece was completed in 1754. In 1747, alongside Giovanni Panini, Zoboli compiled the inventory of the Sacchetti collection purchased by Pope Benedict XIV to form the initial nucleus of the nascent Pinacoteca Capitolina.

Many paintings by Zoboli, although mentioned in various documentary sources, are currently unidentifiable or have been destroyed. Regarding numerous foreign commissions in different European states, the Nativity of Jesus and Santa Caterina Fieschi commissioned by King John V of Portugal; the Blessed Giovanni Regis enjoys the glory of heaven (1716–1719), commissioned by Prince Elector Maximilian II of Bavaria; the Transport of the Ark with David dancing and the Judgment of Solomon sent to London; the Madonna with Child and other figures sent to Cologne; St John Nepomunk with angels sent to Prague; and Pieta with the Maries sent to Vienna cannot be located. Additionally, about thirty works destined for churches and palaces in Rome are also untraceable, according to a detailed list published by Maria Barbara Guerrieri Borsoi. In the past, some paintings have been erroneously attributed to Zoboli. In particular: the Marriage of Mary and the Presentation at the Temple in the Italian Capuchin church in Coimbra and a Suicide of Lucretia in the National Gallery of Dublin.

By express testamentary will, he was buried in the Chiesa delle Santissime Stimmate - Church of the Most Holy Stigmata of St. Francis in Rome, although the exact location of his tomb is currently unknown.

== Paintings ==
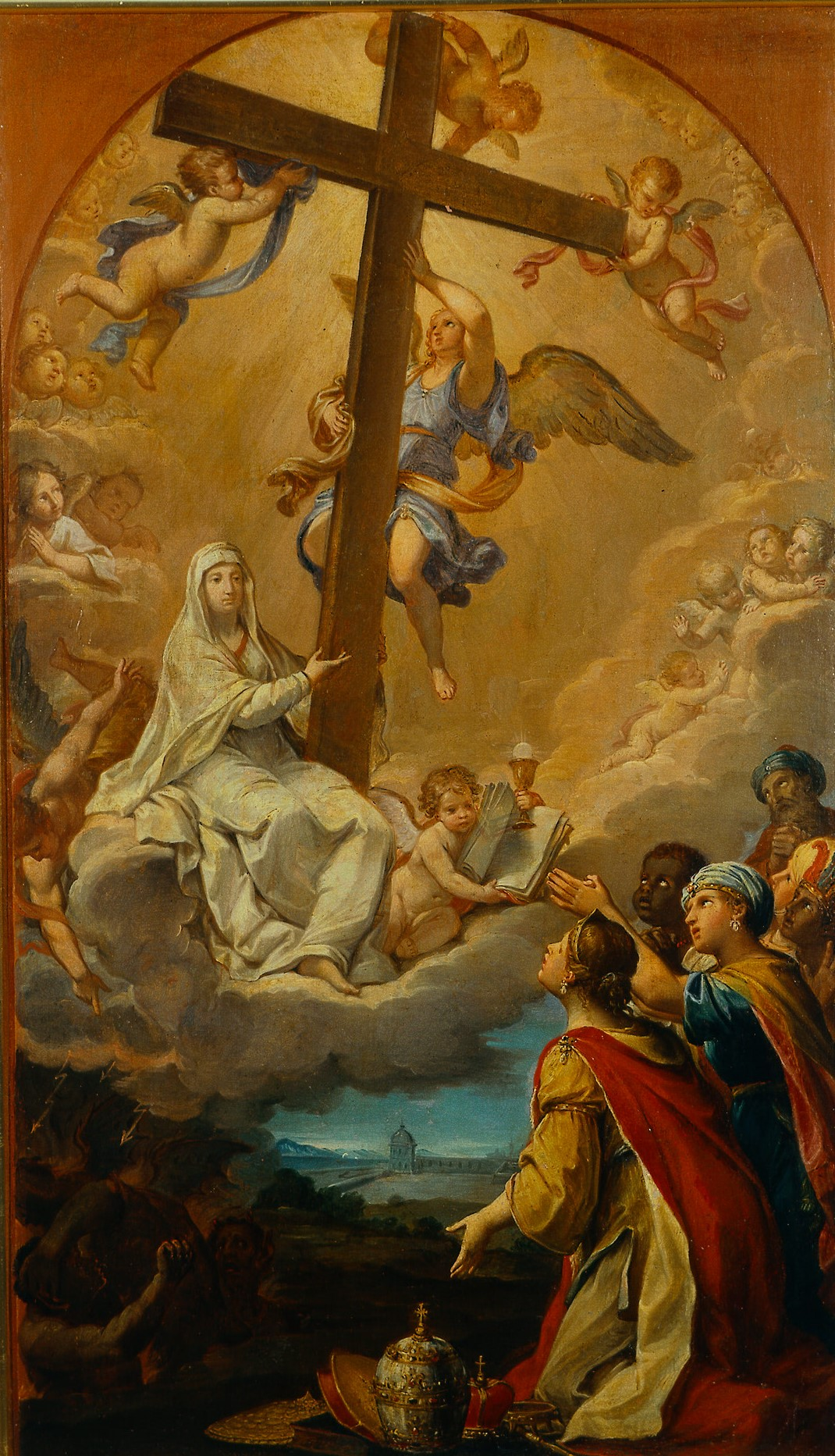
The Triumph of Faith, oil on canvas, 1681–1767, Civic Museum of Modena

- Madonna with Child, Saints Geminianus and Anthony the Abbot (1714) altarpiece in parish church of Sant'Adriano III Papa, Spilamberto
- St Francesca Romana (1724) altarpiece in the chapel of the same name in the church of Santa Maria in Trastevere, Rome
- St Luigi Gonzaga among the plague-stricken & Communion of Stanislaus Kostka (1726) chapel of St. Philip Neri in San Carlo al Corso, Rome
- St Matthew imposes the veil on Iphigenia and the Virgins circa 1735 (Iphigenia was daughter of the Ethiopian king) National Museum of San Matteo, Pisa
- Death of Caesar (1724) Buitoni collection, Perugia
- Death of Pompey (1731) Buitoni collection, Perugia
- Visitation of the Holy Virgin to Elizabeth (1727) and St Jerome listens to the trumpet of the Last Judgment (1729) in Sant'Eustachio, Rome
- Martyrdom of St John Nepomucene (c. 1730) private collection, Rome
- Solomon and Queen of Sheba (c. 1730) in Palazzo Corsini alla Lungara, Rome
- Preaching of St Vincent de Paul (1737) Sala Unica, Palazzo Corsini alla Lungara, Rome
- Martyrdom of Blessed John da Prado, Gallery of Palazzo Barberini, Rome
- Death of St John Francis Regis (1737) in the sacristy of Church of Gesù, Rome
- St Luigi Gonzaga healing a sick person with Madonna and Child, and saints Dominic, Ambrose, and Catherine of Siena, private collection, Rome
- Martyrdom of St Eleutherius, 1st altar on the right, church of San Giovanni della Pigna, Rome, 1738
- Vision of St Andrew Corsini before the Virgin on the left altar of the church of Gesù Bambino all'Esquilino, Rome, 1738
- Portrait of Cardinal Angelo Maria Querini (1747) oval on plaque, right column of triumphal arch in Santa Prassede, Rome
- Holy Family (1748) altarpiece of Chapel of St Joseph, Sant'Apollinare, Rome
- Cartoons of the mosaics of the Chapel of the Madonna della Colonna, in the Basilica of St. Peter's in the Vatican, 1742–1748
- Madonna with Child and Saints, Church of San Giovanni Evangelista, Tivoli
- Madonna with Child and Saints Peter and Paul, Church of San Paolo Apostolo, Genazzano (Rome)
- Saint Anthony the Abbot tempted by demons driven away by St Michael, Church of the Holy Family in Sezze (Latina) Mary receives the Annunciation of the Angel, in the second chapel on the left of the Church of Saints Peter and Caesarius, Guardea (Terni)
- Madonna with Child and two Saints (Saints Francis de Sales and George), Church of Santa Maria della Pietà, Prato
- Archangel Michael (1734) second altar on the right in Sant'Agostino, Modena, (in the current location since 1774, originally painted for the main altar of the then Church of San Michele, now dedicated to San Giovanni Battista)
- Four Miracles of St Vincent Ferrer (1736) chapel of San Domenico in right transept of San Domenico, Modena
- Assumption and Apostles (1733) main altarpiece, New Cathedral, Brescia
- St Philip Neri kneeling before the Madonna (1745) in Santa Maria della Pace, Brescia
- Assumption (1748) altarpiece of the Church of Santa Maria Assunta in the locality of Chiesanuova in Brescia, 1748 (in Chiesanuova since 1803, previously at the main altar of the Church of Santa Maria degli Angeli (Brescia) attached to the convent of the Augustinian nuns)
- Portrait of Cardinal Angelo Maria Querini (1727) Chapter Room of the new Cathedral of Brescia, Brescia, 1727
- Stoning of St Stephen in Cathedral of Saint Stephen (Bracciano), Bracciano (Rome)
- Baptism of Jesus Christ in the Cathedral of Saint Stephen (Bracciano), Bracciano (Rome)
- Ecstasy of Saint Clare of Montefalco in the Church of Santa Maria Novella (Bracciano), Bracciano (Rome)
- Triumph of Faith, sacristy of the Monastery of the Holy Cross (Coimbra) in Portugal, 1745
- Saint Francis of Sales and Blessed Joan Frances de Chantal, Visitation Monastery in Madrid, 1754
- Immaculate Conception (1756) Sant'Antonio dei Portoghesi, Rome
- Esther and Ahasuerus, oil on canvas (83x102 cm), private collection
- Episodes of Roman history
- St Jerome in Meditation, Bper Gallery, Modena
- Salome with the Head of Saint John the Baptist (1708–1712) Estense Gallery, Modena
- Judith with the Head of Holofernes (1708–1712) Estense Gallery, Modena
- Self-portrait in youth, Weeping Saint Peter, The Triumph of Faith, Madonna with Child Enthroned and St Philip Neri, and Immaculate Conception, Civic Museum, Modena
- Self-portrait in adulthood, Estense Gallery, Modena, circa 1730–1739
- Playing the Harp Before King Saul
- Numerous drawings and sketches in the British Museum in London, the Fitzwilliam Museum in Cambridge, the Metropolitan Museum and Morgan Library & Museum in New York, the Museum of Roman Baroque in Palazzo Chigi in Ariccia
- Presentation of Jesus at the Temple and Marriage of the Virgin, Church of Our Lady of the Porziuncola, Lisbon

== Gallery ==
=== Paintings ===
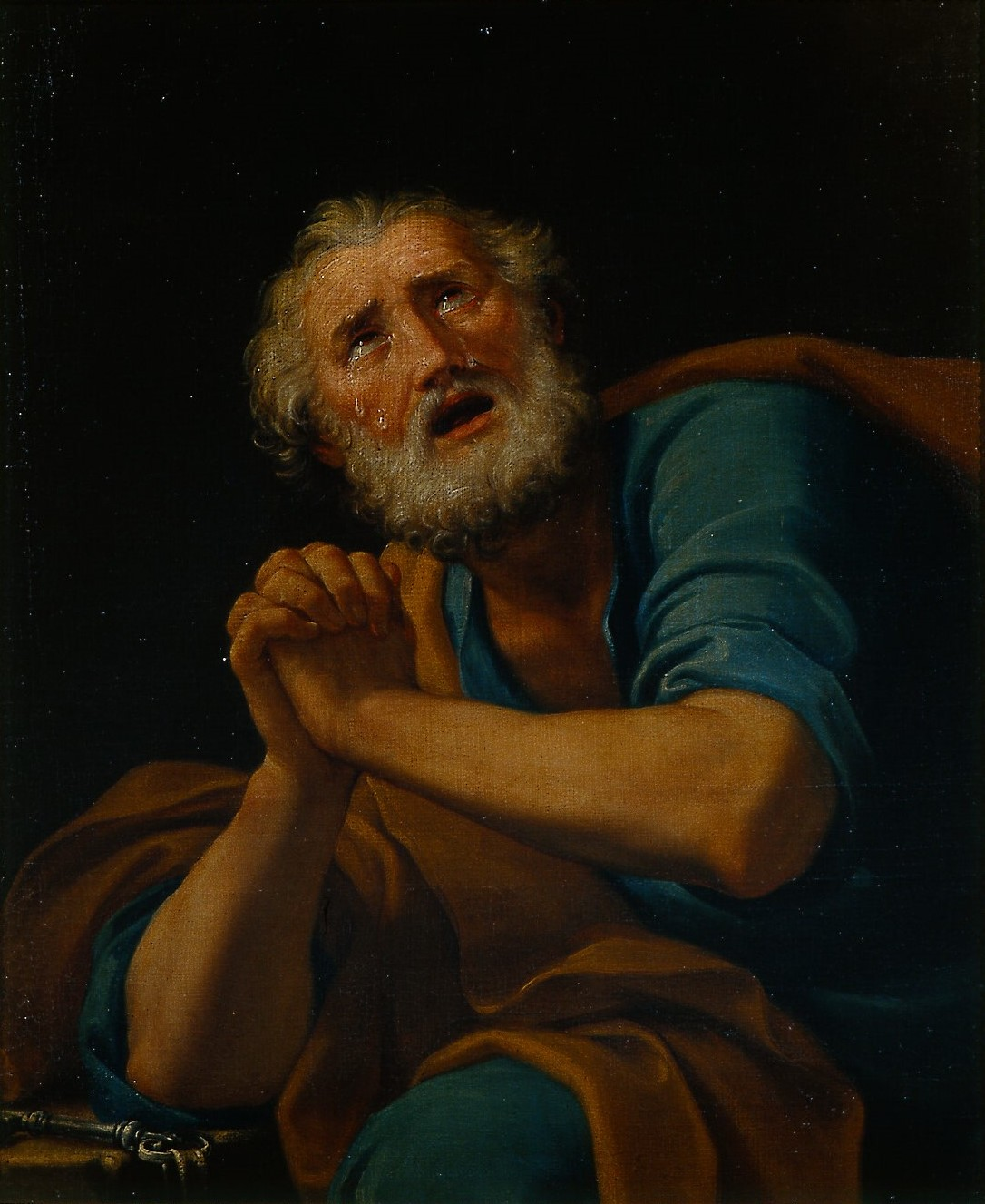
St. Peter weeping, oil on canvas, 1681–1767, Civic Museum of Modena

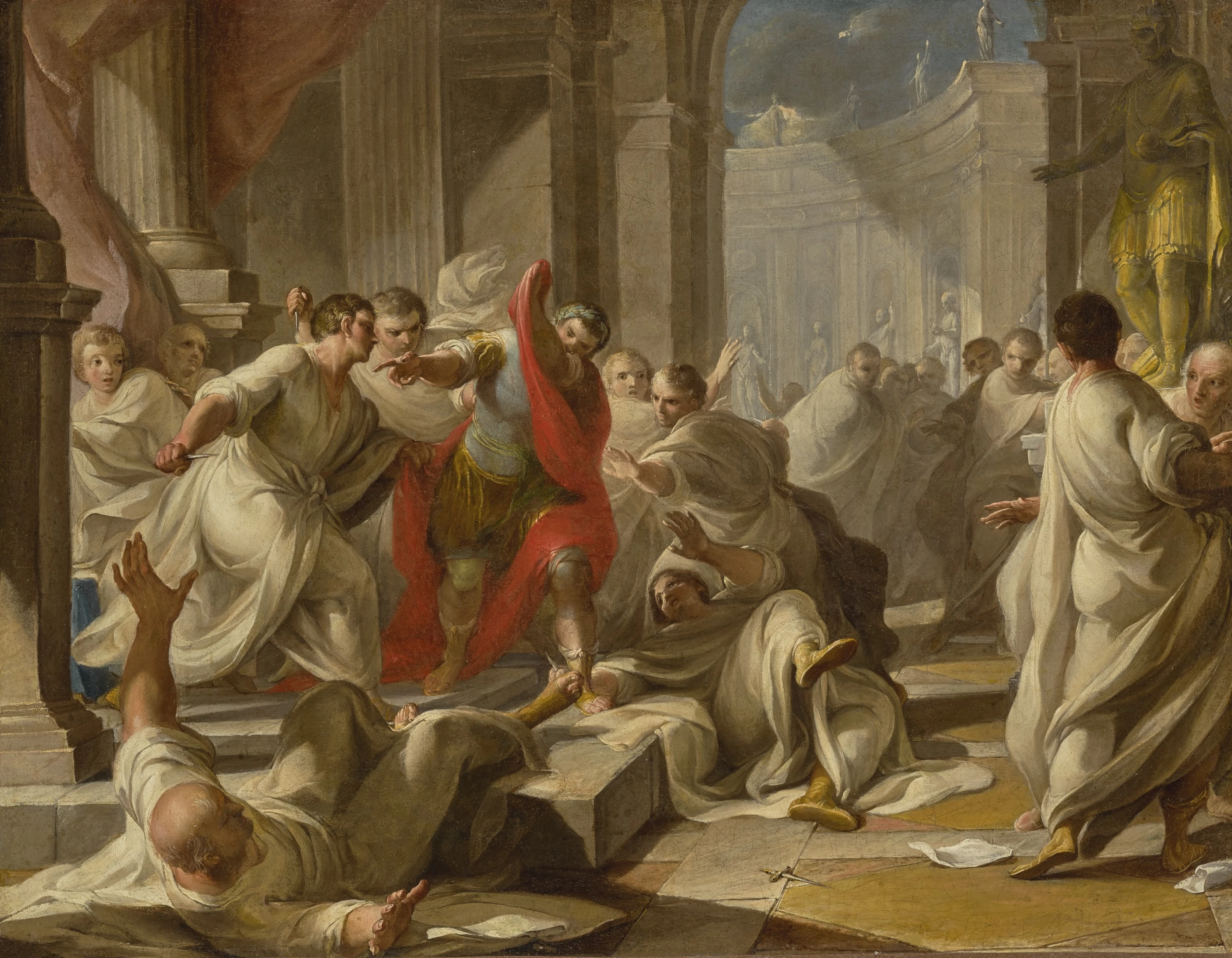
The assassination of Julius Caesar, oil on canvas, priv. col.

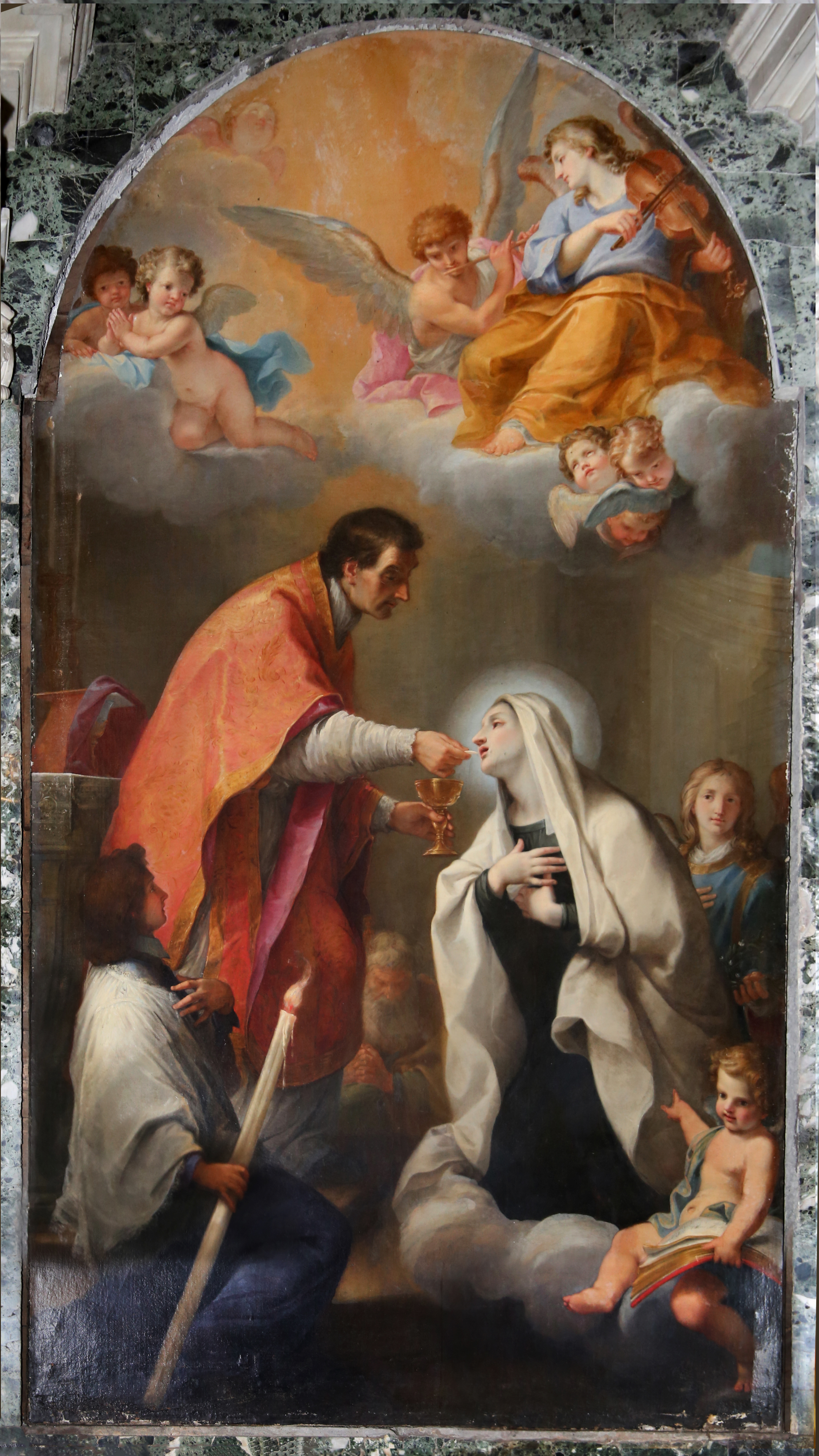
St. Frances of Rome, Santa Maria in Trastevere, Rome

Solomon and Sheba, c. 1730, Palazzo Corsini, Rome

=== Drawings ===
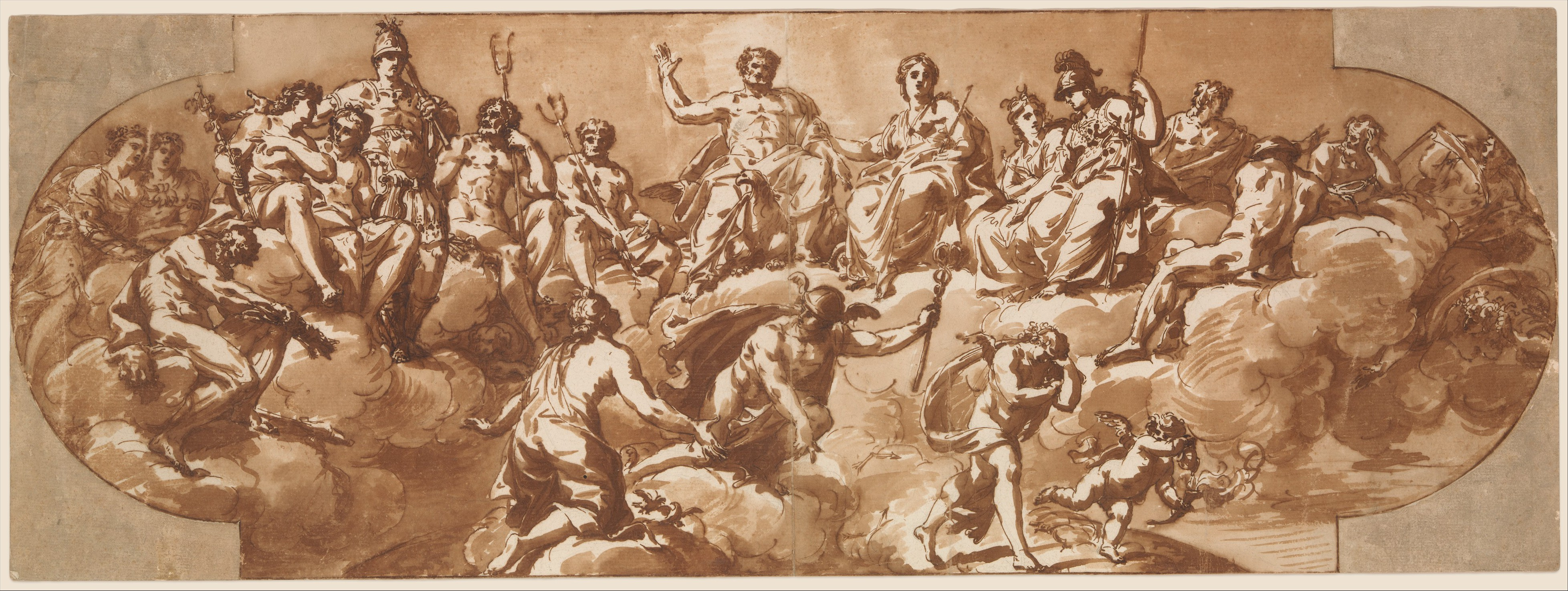
Council of the Gods, pen and brown ink, brush and brown wash, Metropolitan Museum of Art, New York

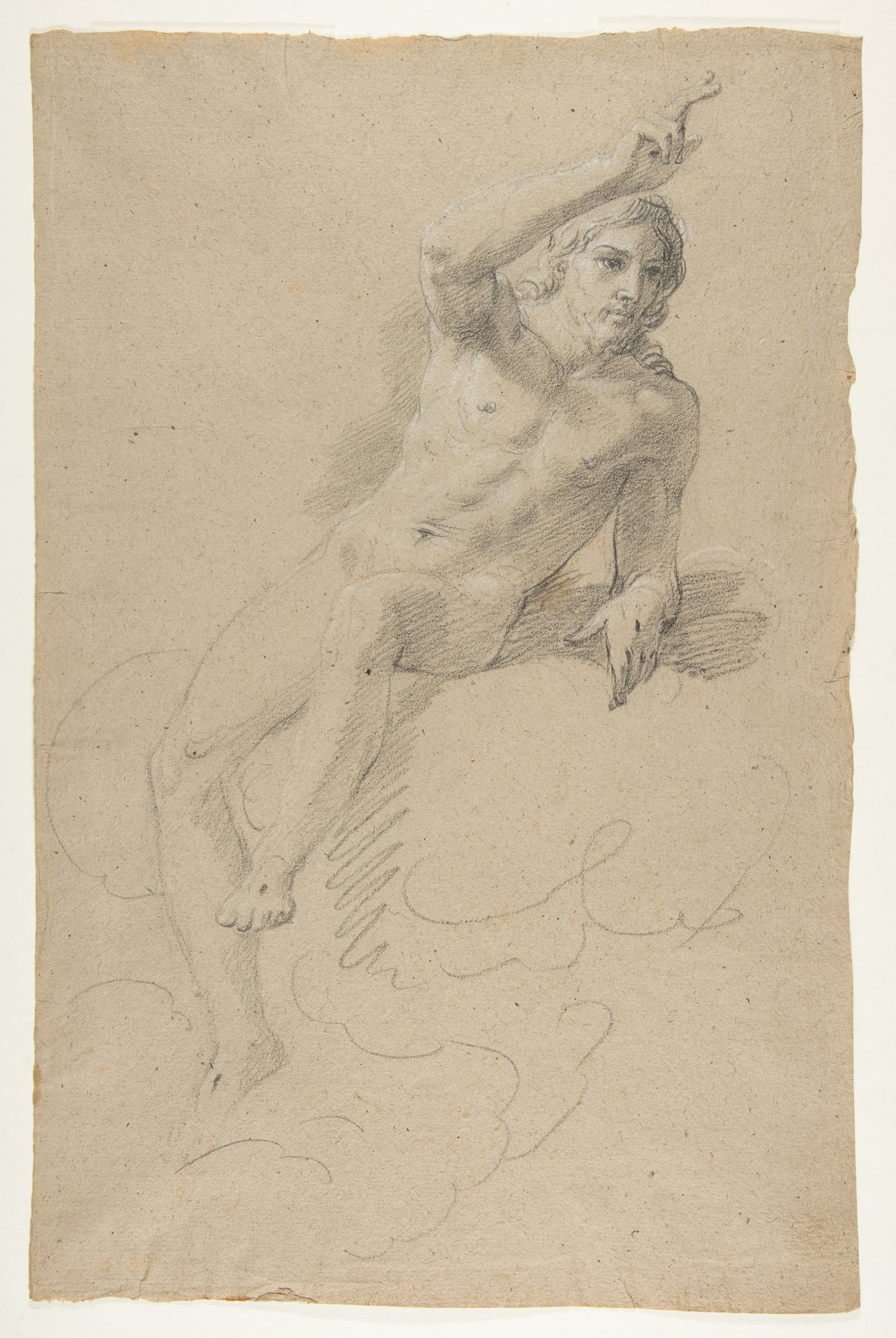
Christ Blessing, black chalk, highlighted with white, on grayish brown paper, Metropolitan Museum of Art, New York

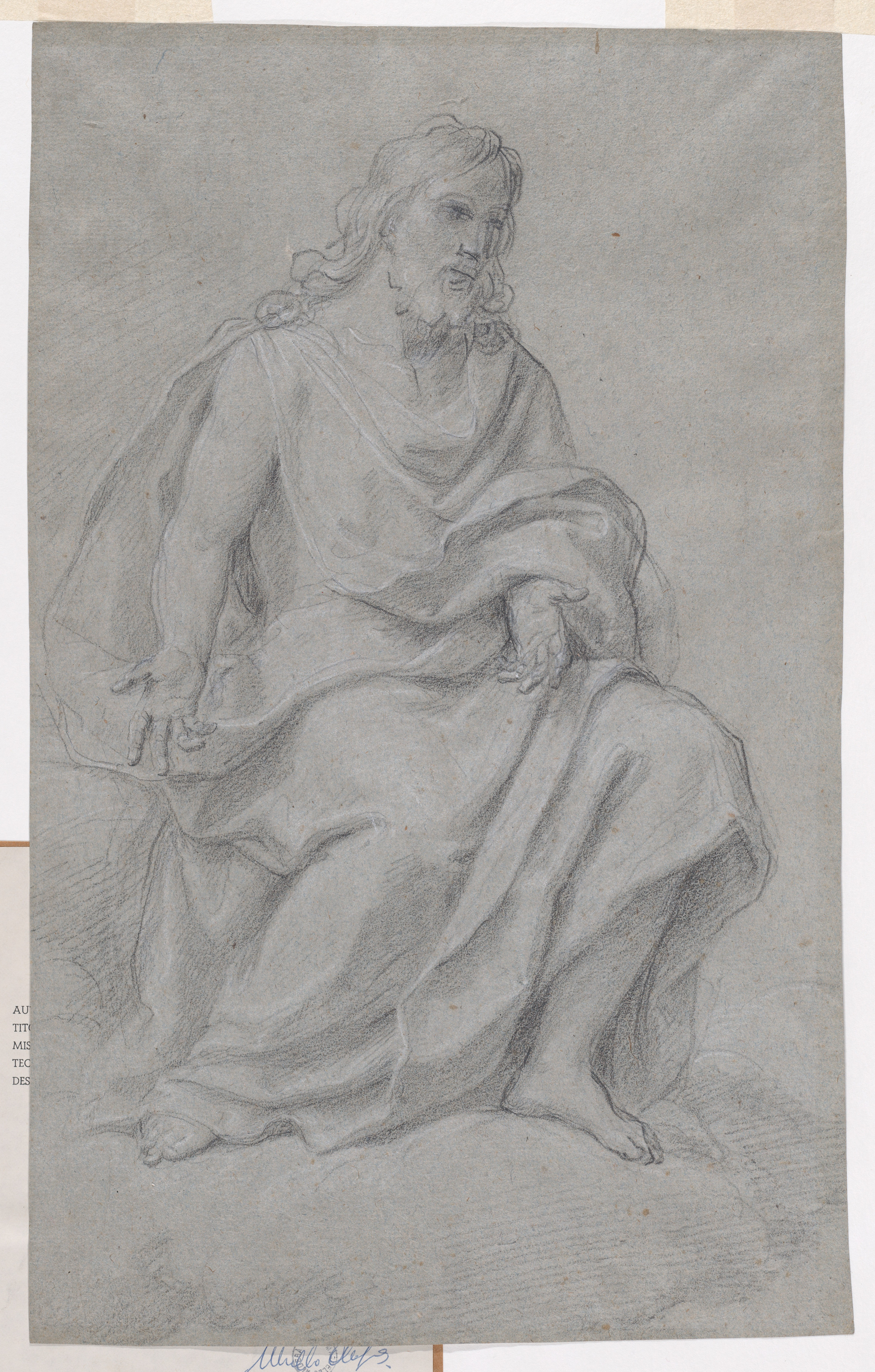
Study for the Figure of Christ, black chalk, highlighted with white chalk, on gray paper, Metropolitan Museum of Art, New York
