= Agostino Ciampelli =

Italian painter (1565–1630)

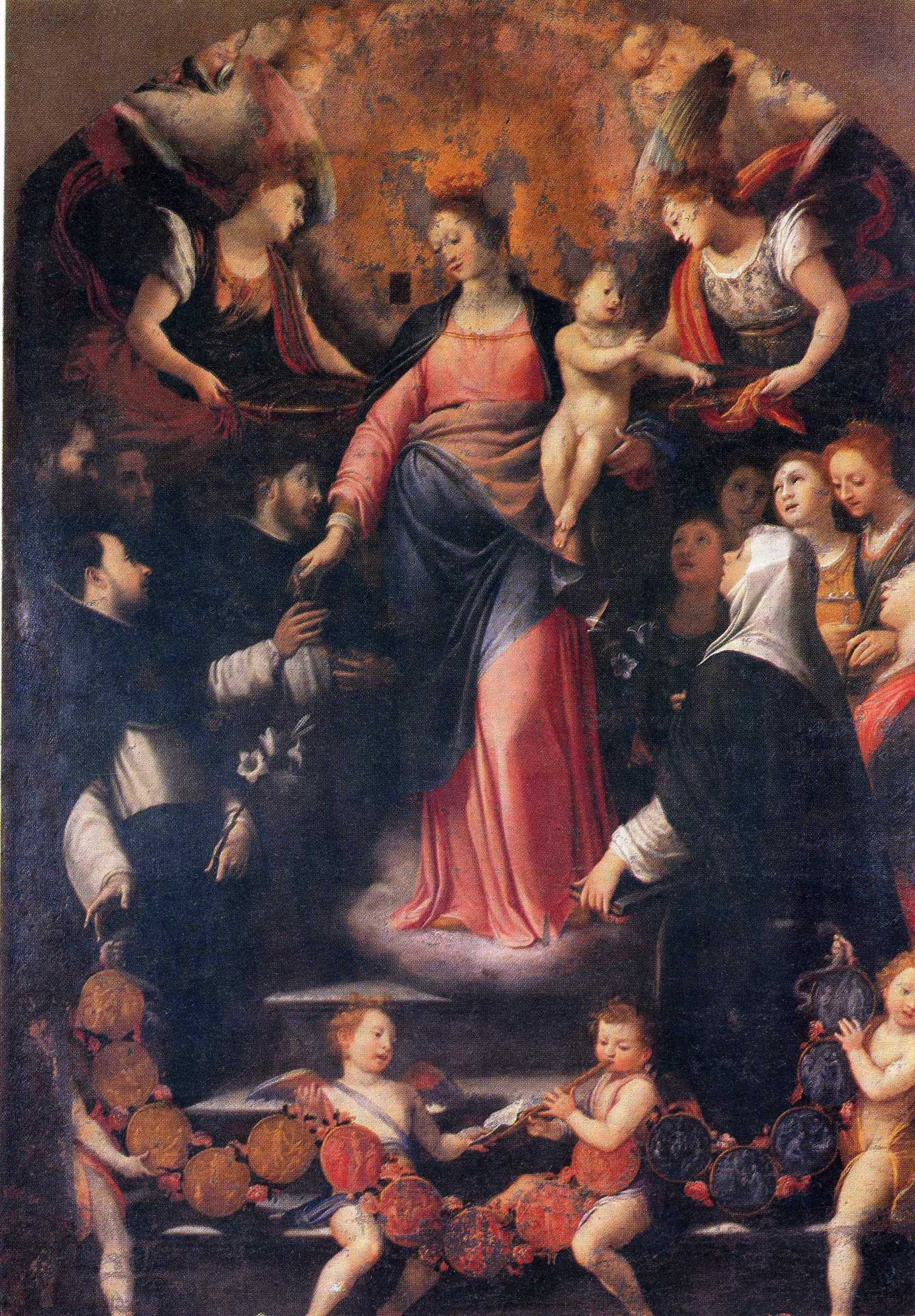
Madonna of the Rosary, by Agostino Ciampelli

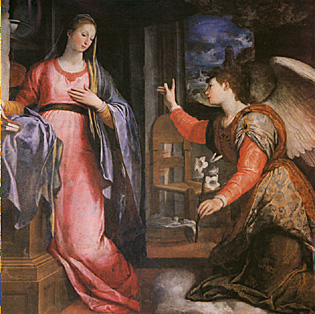
Annunciation, by Agostino Ciampelli

Agostino Ciampelli (29 August 1565 – 22 April 1630) was an Italian painter of the Baroque period. He trained with Santi di Tito in Florence, and painted in Rome under Clement VIII, including a Crucifixion for Santa Prassede and a Saint Giovanni Gualberto in its sacristy; Angels on the walls above the choirstalls in the apse of Santa Maria in Trastevere; frescoes of the Stoning of Saint Vitale in San Vitale and further frescoes in the little church of Santa Bibiena; and The Visitation in Sant Stefano di Pescia. At the Basilica of San Giovanni in Laterano, Ciampelli frescoed the walls of the canons' sacristy, the "Sala Clementina".

== Life ==
=== Florence and Rome ===
Agostino Ciampelli was born in Florence. There is little known about his early childhood. Agostino trained in the studio of Santi di Tito, a leading artists of the Counter Reformation.

Agostino was admitted into the Accademia del Disegno in Florence in 1585. Some of his earliest known works include paintings for a temporary triumphal arch at the entry of Christina of Lorraine into Florence in 1589. These paintings were constructed by Santi and his pupils.

In Florence, Agostino he frescoed a Story of Esther and Ahasuerus in the Tornabuoni Chapel. Agostino also worked with Andrea Commodi at the Gesu, painting scenes from the life of Ignatius that would later adorn Commodi’s tomb in 1605.

Agostino traveled to Rome during the papacy of Clement VIII. There Agostino painted Crucifixion for Santa Prassede, angels on the walls of the apse of Santa Maria in Trastevere and a Visitation in Santo Stefano di Pescia. He also painted a Nativity of the Virgin in San Michelino Visdomini in Florence, and a fresco cycle of Old Testament themes for the Palazzo Corsini. He also painted the Chapel of St. Andrew in the Church of the Gesu in Rome, representing The Martydom of St Stephen on the walls; on the vault The Glory of the Virgin Surrounded by Holy Martyrs; and for the altarpiece, The Martyrdom of St Andrew.

== Influences ==
Santi di Tito was a major influence to Agostino, impacting his style and assisting him in acquiring his skills. Another major role in Agostino’s life was Alessandro de Medici. Alessandro was the most important patron and protector to Agostino. Alessandro took Agostino to Rome in 1594 after Agostino went through schooling from 1590 to 1594 at Florentine Academy in Florence where he stayed until 1630.

Many works were produced with Alessandro and can be found in his titular church of Santa Prassede and at Sant'Agnese fuori le mura in Trastevere.

== Paintings ==
Agostino produced many pieces of artwork in Italy. Two of his paintings that he is well known for are Two Angels Facing Right and Two Angels Facing Left. These bright, vivid panels of angels were done with oil pastels and done around 1600. These paintings formed a now-lost painting or altarpiece. The elegance of these paintings shows the continuing influence of Santi di Tito and may be compared with such paintings as a Christ Appearing to Saint Martin of Tours in the church of Santa Maria del Pianto in Rome, which was one of the few commissions awarded to Ciampelli by Pope Leo XI. Similar angels appear in a number of Ciampello’s paintings, such as The Death of Saint Anthony Abbot which was created in 1612 displayed in the church of San Giovanni dei Fiorentini in Rome. The facial types of the angels may also be compared with the figures of The Baptism of Christ done by Ciampelli, which was formally in the Palazzo Corsini in Florence.

Other paintings produced by Agostino are the Madonna of the Rosary and the Annunciation done in oil pastels and both executed around 1600.

== Other works ==
Ciampelli was also known for using other mediums in his artwork. A very well known drawing of his is The Stoning of St. Stephen which was produced with pen and ink with chalk and was executed when Ciampelli was in Florence around the 1580s. This drawing is a great example of how Ciampelli’s artwork was simple and direct religious art.

Ciampelli also constructed lunettes, one of them being a decoration for a chapel. The lunette consists of angels making music and carrying the symbols of the Immaculate Conception along with angels on the side. The medium used to create this was pen, ink, and wash with chalk and was created in Rome around 1615.
