= Corsini family =

Florentine princely family

Corsini
- Country: Papal States; Grand Duchy of Tuscany; Two Sicilies; Kingdom of Italy
- Current region: Italy
- Founded: c. 1250 AD
- Founder: Niccolo Corsini
- Current head: Filippo Corsini
- Titles: Prince of Sismano

The House of Corsini is the name of an old and influential Italian princely family, originally from Florence, whose members were elected to many important political and ecclesiastical positions, including that of Pope.

== From Poggibonsi to the 14th century ==
The Corsinis originated from the areas of Poggibonsi and from the "Pesa" valley, which are between Siena and Florence. They arrived in Florence towards the end of the 12th century. During the 14th century, they gained prominence as politicians, traders, and churchmen in what was the Republic of Florence. They gave to Florence twelve Priors and forty-seven Gonfalonieres of Justice, the highest appointments in Florence.

Matteo (1322–1402) built a considerable fortune at the Court of England, trading wools, silk and fish. He was a close friend to the poet, Petrarch. A banking crisis, which had been caused by the insolvency of Edward III following his wars in France, forced Matteo to relinquish his position in England. He then returned to Tuscany where he invested in land. In 1371, Matteo and the Corsinis were granted the title of Count Palatine by Charles IV, Holy Roman Emperor. Matteo's cousin, Giovanni, became Seneschal of Armenia and Governor of Rhodes. Another cousin, Filippo (1334–1421), was a law expert, an active diplomat, and was five times Gonfaloniere of Justice, in Florence.

== Early contributions to the Church ==
Two Corsinis were bishops of Fiesole. They were Andrea (1349) and Neri (1374). Two others, Piero (1363) and Amerigo (1411), were bishops of Florence.

Of particular note is Andrea, who was Bishop of Fiesole from 1349 until his death in 1373. He was made a Saint in 1629 (Sant Andrea Corsini, or Saint Andrew Corsini) because of his life of penitence, meditation and dedication to helping the poor. His brother, Neri, was also a Bishop of Fiesole and reached the status of blessed by the church.

Piero (or "Pietro") Corsini was appointed Bishop of Florence in September 1363 by Pope Urban V. His Florentine episcopate ended in June 1370 when Urban V elevated him to Cardinal and made him Cardinal-Priest of San Lorenzo in Damaso. He was named Cardinal-Bishop of Porto e Santa Rufina in 1374 and died in August 1405. He participated in the conclave of 1370, which elected Pope Gregory XI and in the conclave of April 1378, which elected Pope Urban VI. He was present, but did not vote, in the conclave of September 1378 which elected Antipope Clement VII; Clement's election began the Western Schism. He joined the obedience of Antipope Clement VII, and participated in the conclave of 1394, which elected Antipope Benedict XIII. He died in Avignon in August 1405 at the age of 70; at that time, he was Cardinal-Bishop of Porto e Santa Rufina (since 1374).

Amerigo (1411) was the first archbishop of Florence.

== The 15th and 17th centuries ==
At the end of the 15th century, the political influence of the Corsini family decreased, mainly because of the seizure of power carried out by the Medici family. Though some of the Corsinis opposed the Medici, the family as a whole continued to flourish in business and politics under Medici rule, acquiring titles, lands, and offices.

Filippo (1538–1601) and Bartolomeo (1545–1613) consistently increased the wealth of the family thanks to their large and well-organised web of commercial desks around Europe. They developed a large banking and brokerage business. They were also responsible for the construction of Palazzo Corsini on the Lungarno; the palace was built in what is now referred to as 'Florentine Baroque' style. The two Florentine palazzos – one on the Lungarno and the other in Via del Prato – mark the intensifying relationship between the family and the art world in the course of the 17th century. The chapel in the Chiesa del Carmine, dedicated to Sant'Andrea Corsini, was built during the first half of the century. The Galleria Gentilizia, where many works of art were preserved, was developed in the Palazzo which dominates the Arno river. Their cousin, Cardinal Ottavio Corsini, hosted a musical drama in 1620 at his palace. Some professors argue that this is the first time a lyrical opera was staged.

During those years, the Corsinis were granted the feuds of Sismano, Casigliano and Civitella. In 1620, Pope Paul V granted them the title of Marquis of Sismano, which was extended by Pope Urban VIII to Casigliano and Civitella (1629), later Lajatico and Orciatico (1644) and finally Giovagallo and Tresana (1652).

== The 18th and 19th centuries ==
The 18th and 19th centuries marked the height of the Corsini family.

Lorenzo was made Pope with the name of (Clement XII, 1730–1740). He founded the Capitoline Museums, and commissioned (among other things) the Trevi Fountain, the façade of San Giovanni in Laterano in Rome and the majestic Corsini chapel dedicated to Saint Andrew Corsini on its left side. He also commissioned the façade of Santa Maria Maggiore, the Palazzo della Consulta, and the ports in Anzio, Ravenna (porto Corsini) and Ancona. He was the first pope to ban Freemasonry.

In 1736, Cardinal Neri Maria Corsini, nephew of Pope Clement XII, commissioned the structure of the "Palazzo Corsini alla Lungara" in Rome. During the Napoleonic occupation of Rome, the palace hosted Joseph Bonaparte.

Bartolomeo (1683–1752) was commander in chief of the Roman Chivalry, and President of the Cabinet of King Charles of Naples and viceroy of Sicily. He was also the first Prince of Sismano and Duke of Casigliano, and was Sovereign Marquis of Tresana.

Neri (1771–1845) was a smart politician and was Secretary of the Grand Duchy of Tuscany both under Napoleon and under the Restoration. He was appointed as the sole negotiator of Ferdinand III, Grand Duke of Tuscany at the historical Congress of Vienna.

Tommaso (1767–1856) was several times ambassador and senator of the grand duchy.

Andrea (1804–1868) was Minister of Foreign Affairs for the grand duchy.

Tommaso (1835–1919) was MP of the Kingdom of Italy from 1865 to 1882, life senator and finally Mayor of Florence. He founded the "Fondiaria Assicurazioni", and was chairman of the Savings Bank of Florence and chairman of the Southern Italy Railways. With an act of generosity and far-sightedness, he gave the Palazzo della Lungara in Rome to the Italian State and donated his entire Roman collection of paintings, prints and books. The Accademia dei Lincei, which he founded, is still located on these premises.

Tommaso (VIII Prince of Sismano, 1903–1980) nephew of Tommaso, took part in Italy's political life as a Constituent Assembly deputy for the constitution of the Italian Republic. As an expert in agriculture and farm animal breeding, he contributed to the modernization of these two sectors in Tuscany and Umbria. His wife, Donna Elena, managed to save the Galleria Corsini and many other treasures from bombings and from the passing of the front line during World War II.

Giovanni (1911–1988), Marquis of Lajatico and Count Palatine, escaped during WWII from a British prison in Ethiopia together with 4 comrades, eventually reaching freedom in Portuguese Mozambique, after 3500 miles of escape.

== Today ==
The family still exists today, with three main branches in London, Florence, Rome, Milan, Belgium, the United States, the Philippines and Brazil.

One branch of the Corsini family living in Italy is involved in wine and olive oil production. The estate is managed today by Duccio Corsini. Villa Le Corti, the old family residence, can be toured today by visitors, learning about the history and traditions of the Corsini family.

The 9th, and present, Prince of Sismano is Prince Filippo (born 1937), who was married to Nobile Giorgiana Avogadro di Collobiano (3 August 1939 in Varese – 1 August 2020). Princess Giorgiana Corsini was a key figure in Florentine cultural and artistic life, founder of the exhibition 'Crafts and Palace' in the historic Palazzo Corsini in Florence. She died of a suspected heart attack while swimming near the family's estate in Argentario in August 2020, aged 80.

The present prince's heir is his son, Prince Duccio, Duke of Casigliano (born 1964). The duke's son and eventual heir to the princely title was Prince Filippo Corsini. Aged 21, he was killed in London on 31 October 2016 in a cycling accident. The current heir to the princely title is Prince Duccio's distant cousin, Don Lorenzo Corsini (born 1946).

== Notable members of the House of Corsini ==
- Saint Andrew Corsini (1302–1373) was a member of this family.
- Marietta Corsini, wife of Niccolò Machiavelli
- Ludovico Corsini (born 1993), Italian Mozambican swimmer specializing in breaststroke
- In 1730 Lorenzo Corsini was elected pope as Clement XII.
- Maria Corsini
- Bartolomeo Corsini (1683-1752) was 1st Prince of Sismano and Viceroy of Sicily

== Notable estates ==
- Palazzo Corsini al Prato (Florence)
- Palazzo Corsini al Parione (Florence)
- Palazzo Corsini alla Lungara (Rome)
- Villa Le Corti (San Casciano in val di Pesa)
- Villa Corsini di Mezzomonte
- Villa Corsini di Castello
- Castello di Sismano
- Castello di Casigliano
- Villa di Salvadonica
- Fattoria Corsini della Marsigliana
- Sebastian mastin

== See also ==
- Neri Corsini (disambiguation)
