= Andrew Corsini =

Italian Roman Catholic saint

Saint Andrew Corsini O.Carm.
- Bishop of Fiesole
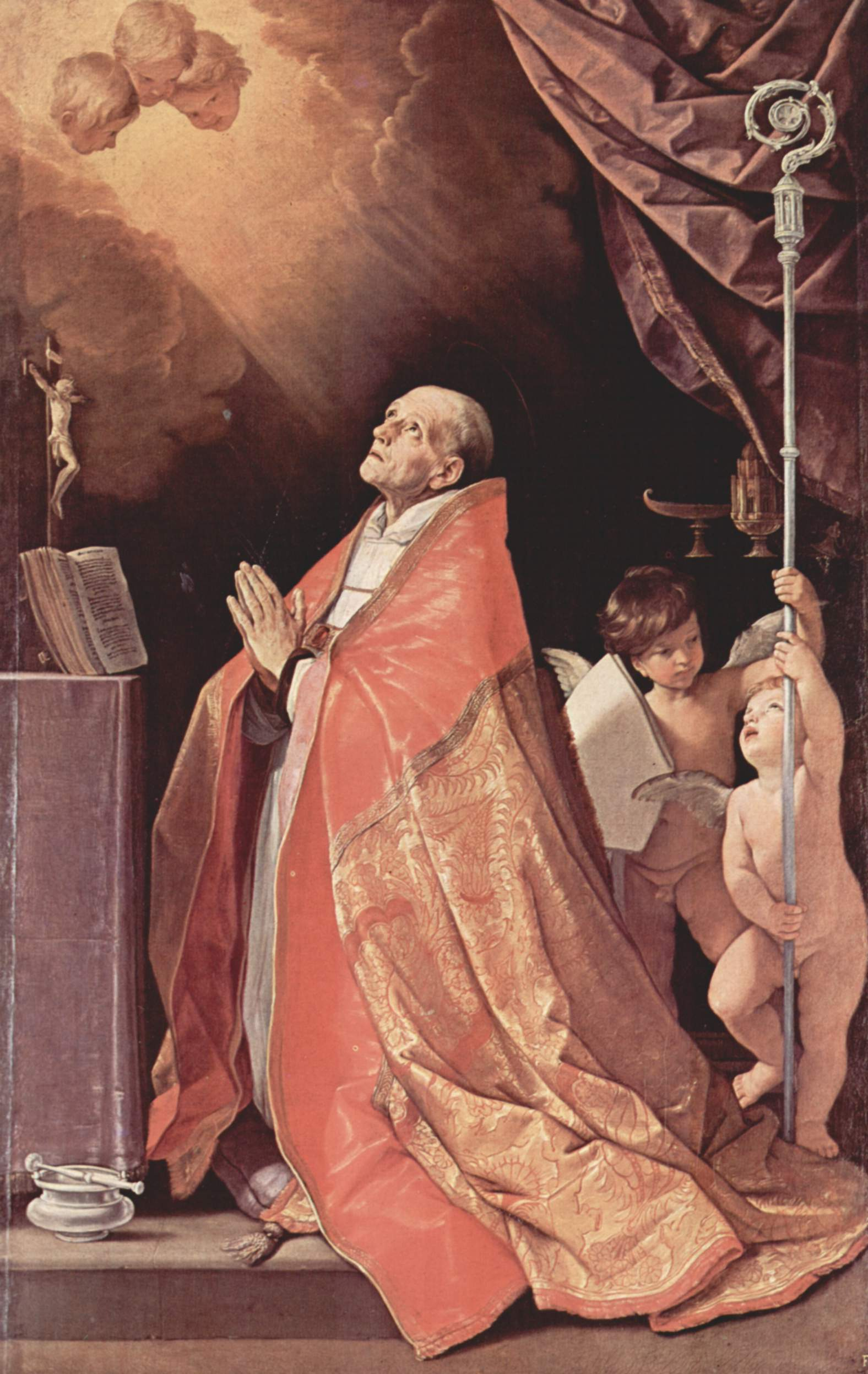
- San Andrew Corsini in preghiera - Guido Reni (1630-1635).
- Church: Roman Catholic Church
- Diocese: Fiesole
- See: Fiesole
- Appointed: 13 October 1349
- Installed: c. 1350
- Term ended: 6 January 1373
- Predecessor: Fulgino Carboni
- Successor: Neri Corsini

Orders
- Ordination: 1328 by Francesco Silvestri
- Consecration: c. 1350 by Angelo Acciaioli

Personal details
- Born: Andrea Corsini; 30 November 1302 Florence, Republic of Florence
- Died: 6 January 1373 (aged 70) Fiesole, Republic of Florence

Sainthood
- Feast day: 4 February, 6 January; 9 January (Carmelites)
- Venerated in: Roman Catholic Church
- Beatified: 21 April 1440; Rome, Papal States by Pope Eugene IV
- Canonized: 22 April 1629; Saint Peter's Basilica, Rome, Papal States by Pope Urban VIII
- Attributes: Holding a cross; Wolf and lamb at his feet; Floating on cloud above battlefield; Mitre; Episcopal attire; Carmelite habit
- Patronage: Florence; Fiesole; Diplomats; Against civil disorder; Against riots
- Shrines: Santa Maria del Carmine

Andrea Corsini (30 November 1302 – 6 January 1373 or 1374) was an Italian Catholic prelate and professed member from the Carmelites who served as the Bishop of Fiesole from 1349 until his death.

Corsini led a wild and dissolute life until a rebuke from his mother moved him to go to the Santa Maria del Carmine church where he resolved to join the Carmelites as a priest and friar. He exercised various roles in the order, until reluctantly he accepted his episcopal position. In order to accept that position, he imposed greater mortifications upon himself than that required by the order, and dedicated himself to the plight of the poor.

Devotion to the late bishop became so profound after his death that miracles were reported at his tomb. The longstanding and popular devotion to Corsini led to Pope Eugene IV confirming his beatification on 21 April 1440 and Pope Urban VIII canonizing him as a saint on 22 April 1629.

== Early life ==
Andrew Corsini was born in Florence on 30 November 1302 into the noble and illustrious Corsini family, one of twelve children born to Nicholas Corsini and Peregrina (some sources suggest Gemma) degli Stracciabende. He was named in honor of Saint Andrew whose feast day was on his birthday. Before his birth, his parents dedicated him to God, under the protection of the Blessed Virgin.

He was wild in his youth; extravagance and vice were normal to him and it pained his devout mother. His parents severely rebuked him for his behavior, and he resolved to amend his ways and try to live up to their expectations. He went to the Carmelite monastery at the Santa Maria del Carmine church to consider what course to take and despite the entreaties of his dissolute friends, decided to become a friar.

== Carmelite friar ==
Corsini joined the Carmelites in Florence in 1318 for his novitiate and began a life of great mortification. He was ordained to the priesthood in 1328 and said his first Mass in a hermitage so as to avoid the customary family celebrations. Corsini began preaching in Florence, and was then sent for his studies to the University of Paris and later to Avignon, where he resided in with his cousin Cardinal Pietro Corsini. He returned to Florence in 1332 and was chosen as prior of his convent. He became known as the "Apostle of Florence". In 1348 he was appointed as the order's Tuscan Provincial during the General Chapter meeting in Metz.

== Bishop ==
On 13 October 1349, Pope Clement VI appointed him Bishop of Fiesole. Upon learning of this appointment, the reluctant Corsini went into hiding. An inscription on his tomb states that "he was snatched from the Carmel to the church and the miter of Fiesole". This perhaps gave rise to the legend that he fled, and that a child discovered him at the charterhouse at Enna, and he later accepted the nomination as bishop as the result of a vision.

He redoubled his austerities as bishop, wearing a hair shirt and sleeping on a bed of vine-branches. At Fiesole, just northeast of Florence, he gained a reputation as a peacemaker between rival political factions and for his care of the poor. Pope Urban V sent him to Bologna as a papal legate to heal the breach between the nobles and the people. "His family connections made him acceptable to the nobility and his life of poverty endeared him to the poor and he did succeed in bringing peace."

Corsini appointed two vicars to aid him in governing his diocese, and enforced discipline amongst the diocesan priests. A number of miraculous healings were attributed to his intercession.

It was reported that in 1372 or 1373, as he celebrated Midnight Mass on Christmas Eve, that the Blessed Virgin appeared to him and told him he would leave this world on the Three Kings' feast. It came to pass that he fell ill on Christmas night and died as foretold, on 6 January 1373 or 1374. His remains were moved to Florence in the evening of 2 February 1374 and were later found to be incorrupt upon exhumation in 1385. The location of his burial was damaged in 1771 but his remains were left undisturbed.

== Veneration ==
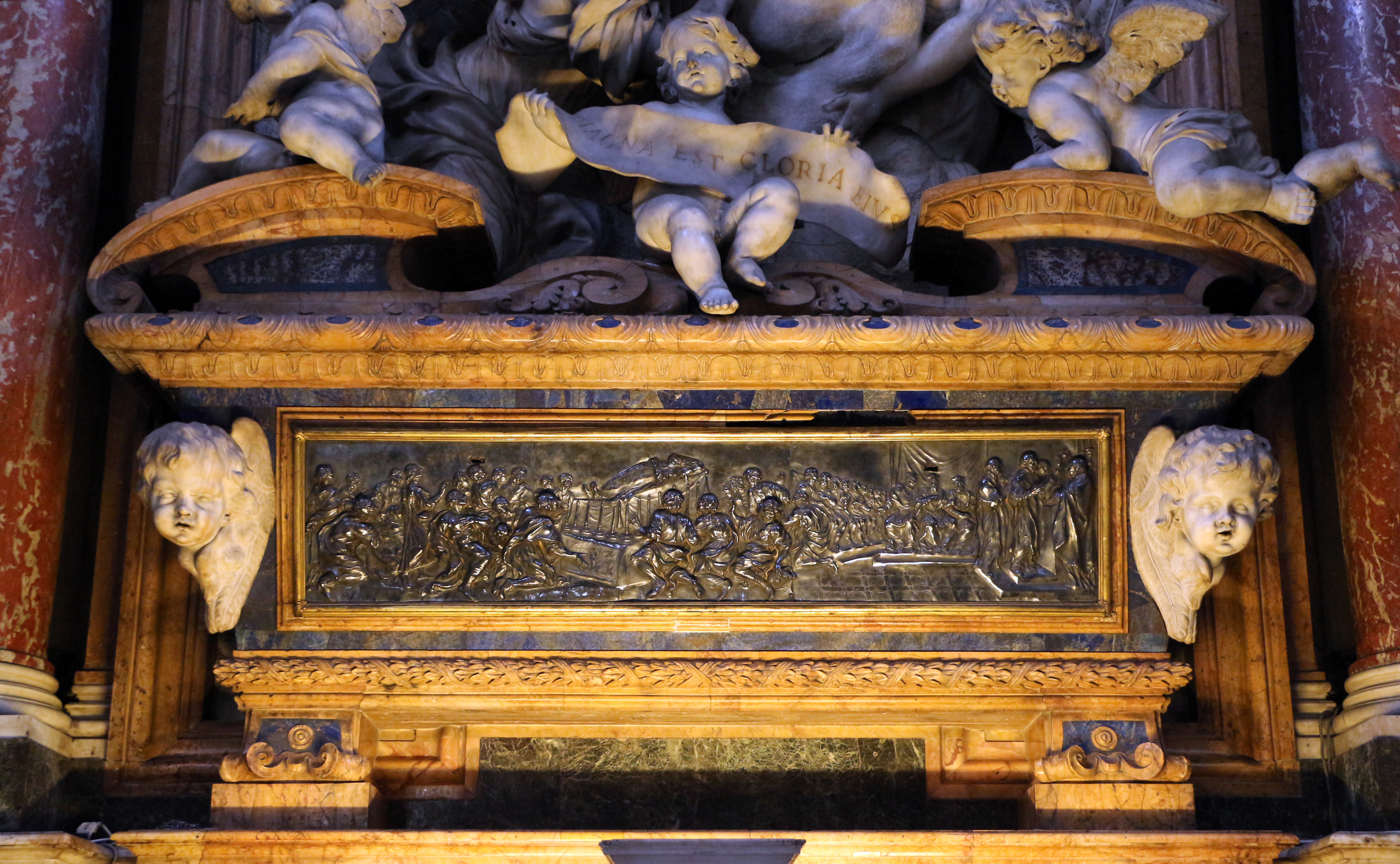
Tomb.

Miracles so multiplied at his death that Pope Eugene IV permitted a public devotion to him, although it was not confirmed until later. Pope Eugene IV beatified Andrew Corsini on 21 April 1440. Among the miracles attributed to Corsini's intervention was the Florentine victory over the Milanese at the Battle of Anghiari on 29 June 1440. Petitions were lodged in 1465 and 1466 to Pope Paul II requesting the canonization, and the pope appointed a commission to investigate the matter, though it came to no conclusion. Pope Urban VIII canonized Corsini on 22 April 1629.

In 1675 after his canonization the members of the Corsini house had the Corsini Chapel built in the Carmelite church of Santa Maria del Carmine as a more suitable resting place for his remains. Pope Clement XII - born Lorenzo Corsini - erected in the Roman Basilica of Saint John Lateran a magnificent chapel dedicated to his kinsman.

In 1702 or 1703 a statue in his honor was commissioned and placed along the colonnade in Saint Peter's Square. Cardinal Neri Maria Corsini, nephew of Pope Clement XII, commissioned in 1738 the painter Jacopo Zoboli to paint a painting for the church of Gesù Bambino all'Esquilino in Rome. The painting is housed at the left side altar. The minor figures in the painting, behind the angel on the right and armed with spears, allude to the Battle of Anghiari. The suggestion to the painter may well have come from Cardinal Corsini, or even from Clement XII himself, as the Pope's family frequently emphasised his Florentine origins and thus sought to highlight Saint Andrew's role in protecting the Florentine army. The choice to place the Bishop's mitre and crozier in the hands of the angels, to the right and left of the saint respectively, was suggested to the painter, with the dual purpose, on the one hand, of emphasising the saint's humility and his very austere way of life and, on the other, to celebrate the heavenly glory of Saint Andrew's episcopal dignity, which brought honour and prestige to the Pope's family. The main theme of the painting, the vision of the Virgin Mary, derives from the legend – widely held at the time – that the Virgin appeared to Andrew and made him promise to accept the office of bishop.

== See also ==
- Book of the First Monks
- Constitutions of the Carmelite Order
- Santa Maria del Carmine
- Carmelite Rite
- Roman Catholic Diocese of Fiesole
- Saint Andrew Corsini, patron saint archive
