= Neri (given name) =

Neri (Hebrew: נֵרִי) (lit. "my candle/lamp") is a unisex given name of distinct double origins—one coming from Hebrew and the other from Italian. The Hebrew form is derived from Hebrew ner, meaning "candle". It is a variant form of Neriya, meaning "Yah (יהו/יה) is my candle (נֵרִי)". The Italian form is a medieval derivative from the Italian name Ranieri, or Guarneri.

Notable people with the name include:

- Neri di Bicci (1419–1491), Italian painter
- Neri Bandiera (born 1989), Argentine footballer
- Neri Cardozo (born 1986), Argentine footballer
- Neri Colmenares (born 1959), Filipino human rights lawyer and activist
- Neri Corsini (disambiguation)
- Neri Marcorè (born 1966), Italian actor, voice actor, imitator, TV presenter and singer
- Neri Naig, Filipina actress Nerizza Garcia Presnede Naig-Miranda (born 1985)
- Neri Oxman (born 1976), Israeli architect, designer, and professor at the Massachusetts Institute of Technology Media Lab
- Neri Parenti (born 1950), Italian director and screenwriter

== See also ==
- Neri, Father of Shealteil in Matthew 1:12 and Luke 3:27)
- Nery McKeen (born 1957), Cuban retired middle-distance runner
