= Sismano =

Frazione of Avigliano Umbro, Italy

Coordinates: 42°41′N 12°26′E

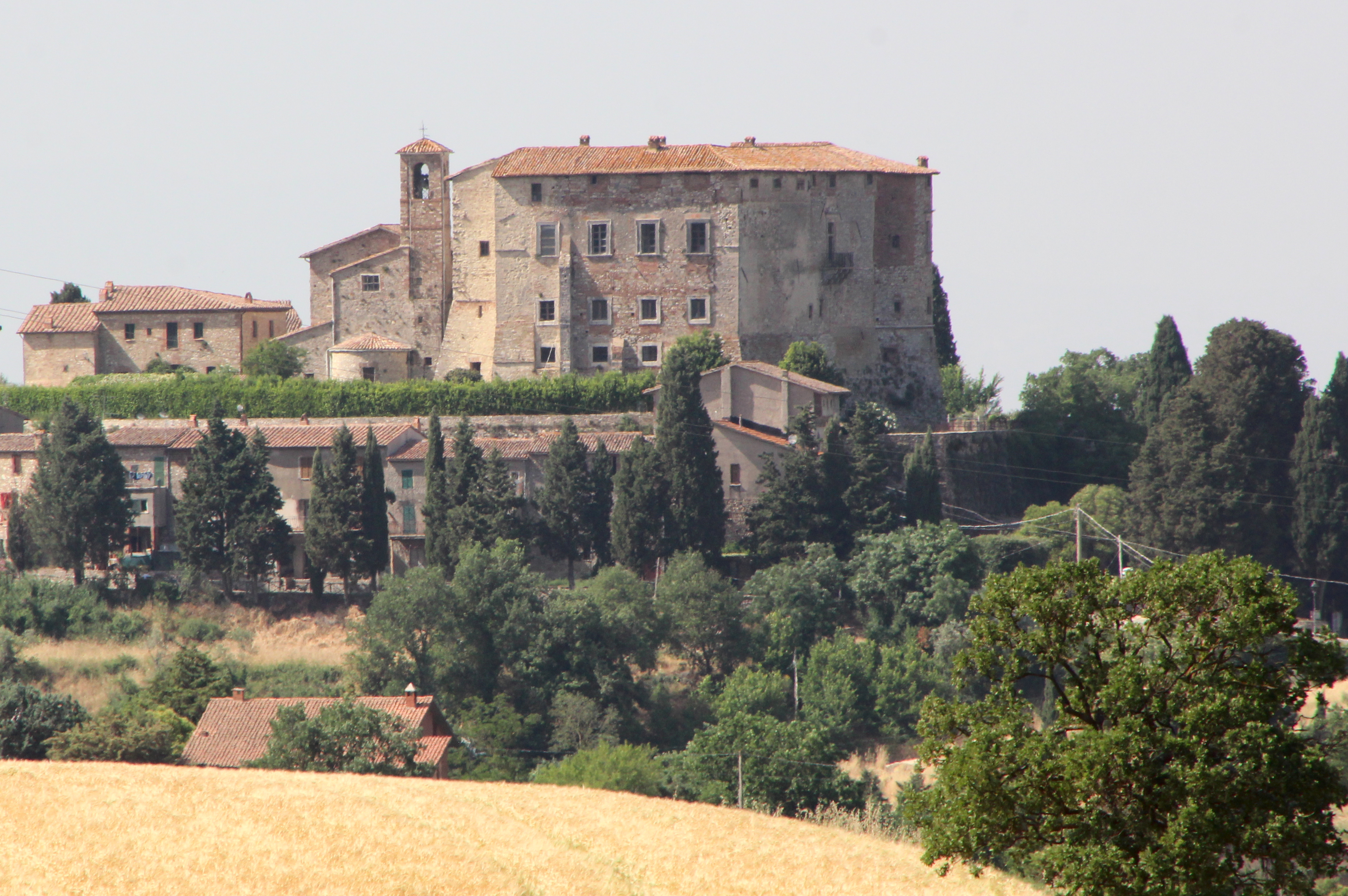
The castle of Sismano

Sismano is a small medieval borgo and a frazione of the Italian commune of Avigliano Umbro, in the province of Terni.

Sismano stands at an elevation of 433 metres (1,421 ft) above sea level and had a population of 12 residents in the village proper and a further 71 in the surrounding countryside in 2021, according to Istat data. (Note: To obtain the data from the website: 1. Select "Basi Territoriali 2021: Confini amministrativi, Località, Sezioni di censimento, Aree SubCom".; 2. Use the search function to find the desired place.; 3. Click the Attribute Table icon in the top-right corner.; 4. In the panel that appears at the bottom of the page, select "Località 2021".)

== History ==
The large fortified rocca, with two semi-circular towers, was first built in the 11th century as part of the border defenses of Todi.

By 1292 at the latest, Cardinal Benedetto Caetani (who later became Pope Boniface VIII) was the owner of the castle of Sismano, purchasing it for 8,500 gold florins from the Florentine merchant Manetto Rainaldi de' Pulci. Pulci had himself bought the castle only in 1288 from the previous owners, the brothers Pietro and Rainaldo.

A survey conducted at Todi records 21 hearths in 1322.

In 1324 a bloody battle was fought nearby between the forces of Todi and Perugia, along with their respective allies from Narni, Spoleto and Florence. The castle's fortifications were strengthened in 1340, during a conflict between two local noble families, the Atti and the Chiaravalle. Their feud, which intensified after the beheading of Catalano Atti in 1393, gave rise to numerous violent episodes.

In 1461 Matteo di Ulisse Chiaravalle seized the castle from Giacomo and Andrea degli Atti. In 1500 Pope Alexander VI settled the long-standing dispute in favor of the Atti, lords of Todi. On 14 October 1575, Eleanora Atti was murdered there by her husband, Orso II Orsini.

The Castello di Sismano was rebuilt in 1607.

In 1620, Pope Urban VIII granted the title of Marchese di Sismano to a member of the Neri family. In 1701, Sismano was a feudal domain of the Marquess Corsini.

Later, during the pontificate of Pope Clement XII (1730–1740), the fief of Sismano was erected into a principality in favor of his nephew Bartolomeo Corsini. By 1816, Sismano belonged to Prince Don Tommaso Corsini.

In 1859 Sismano had a population of 422 inhabitants, forming 77 families in 76 houses.

IN 1975, Sismano was detached from the municipality of Montecastrilli and incorporated into the newly established municipality of Avigliano Umbro.

== Geography ==
Sismano is a hamlet located about 4 miles (6.4 km) from Montecastrilli and approximately 10 miles (16 km) from Todi. It stands on a hill in an open and expansive position. The climate was described as very healthy and exposed to open air currents. Outside the village there are three springs.

== Economy ==
In the mid-19th century most of the landed property belonged to the Corsini family, whose historic palace stands in the settlement.

== Religion ==
The parish church is dedicated to Saint Andrew, who is venerated as the patron saint; his feast is celebrated in October.
