= Neri Corsini =

Neri Corsini may refer to:

- Neri Corsini (1614–1678), cardinal from 1664 onwards
- Neri Maria Corsini (1685–1770), nephew of Pope Clement XII, made cardinal by his uncle in 1730
