= Antonio Consetti =

Italian painter (1686–1766)

Antonio Consetti (23 February 1686 – 24 January 1766) was an Italian historical painter, born and died in Modena, Duchy of Modena and Reggio.

== Biography ==
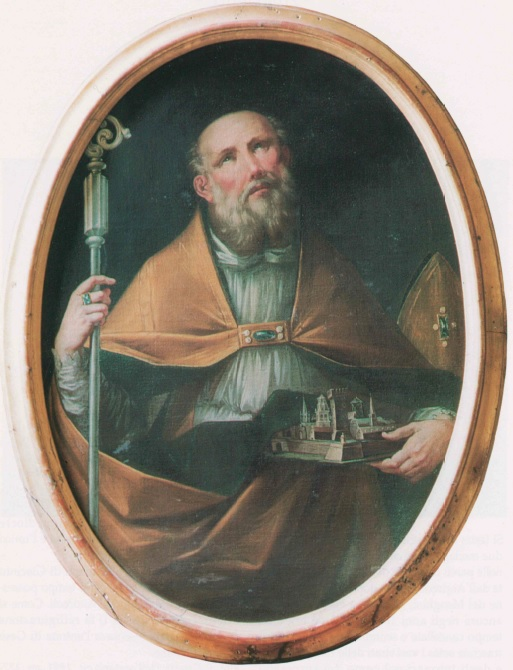
Antonio Consetti, Saint Possidonio patron of Mirandola

He was represented in the Estense Gallery of his native city, by a Virgin of the Rosary with St Dominic and a St Joseph & Angels. He painted the Virgin and child with St Rose at the Museo Civico d'Arte di Modena . Along with Pellegrino Spaggiari, he decorated the vault of the Sala dei Cardinali at the Collegio San Carlo of Modena. In 1722, he moved back to Modena to open an Academy of drawing. He was the son of the painter Jacopino Consetti (1651-1726) Among Consetti's pupils were Pietro Boselli who worked mainly in Rome., Silvio Barbini in Modena, and Alessandro Bruggiati
