= Neri Corsini (1614–1678) =

Italian cardinal

His Eminence Neri Corsini
- Cardinal-Priest of Santi Nereo ed Achilleo
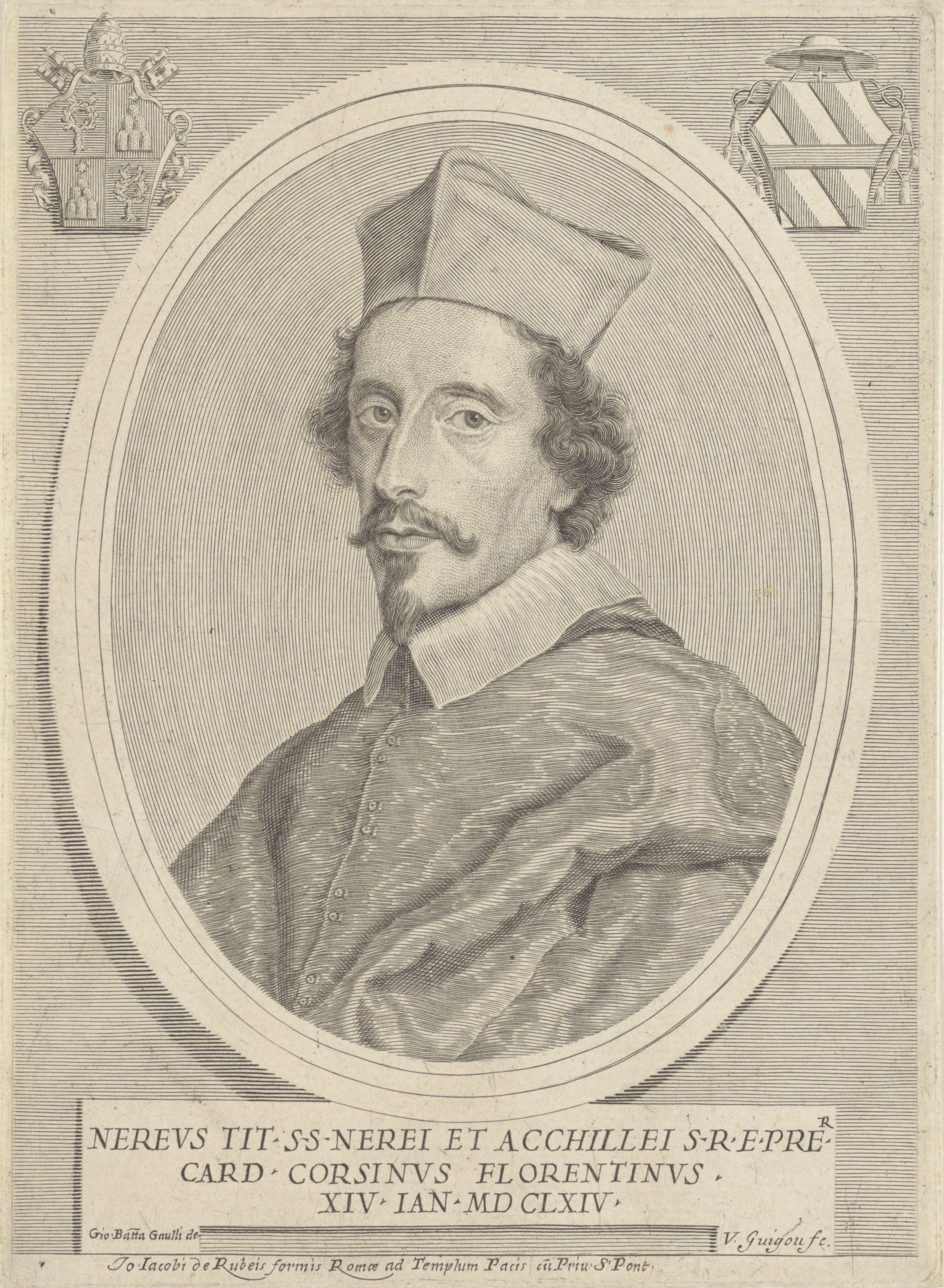
- Portrait of Cardinal Neri Corsini
- Church: Roman Catholic Church
- In office: 1666–1678

Orders
- Consecration: 1 September 1652 by Fabio Chigi
- Created cardinal: 15 March 1666
- Rank: Cardinal-Priest

Personal details
- Born: 1 August 1614 Florence
- Died: 19 September 1678 (aged 64) San Casciano ai Bagni
- Coat of arms: Neri Corsini's coat of arms

Neri Corsini, Nerio Corsini or Neri Corsini the Elder (to distinguish himself from Neri Maria Corsini) (1 August 1614 in Florence – 19 September 1678 in Florence) was an Italian cardinal from the noble Corsini family.

== Biography ==
He was the son of Filippo Corsini and Maddalena Machiavelli. He was the uncle of Pope Clement XII and great-uncle of cardinal Andrea Corsini.

A cleric of the Camera Apostolica under Pope Innocent X, he became Tesoriere in 1660. He was made a cardinal presbyter in the 14 January 1664 consistory, and two months later, he was given the titulus of Santi Nereo e Achilleo. From 1672 to 1677, he was put in charge of the diocese of Arezzo as a personal titular of the archbishop. He also took part in the 1667, 1669–70 and 1676 papal conclaves. His remains are buried in the Corsini Chapel in Santa Maria del Carmine.

== Sources ==
- Miranda, Salvador. "CORSINI, Neri (1614-1678)". The Cardinals of the Holy Roman Church. Florida International University. OCLC 53276621.
- Cheney, David M. "Neri Cardinal Corsini †". Catholic-Hierarchy.org. ^{[self-published]}

== See also ==
- Pope Clement XII
- Pope Innocent X
