= Palazzo Corsini (Via del Parione) =

Coordinates: 43°46′14″N 11°14′57″E

The Palazzo Corsini is a monumental palace located on Via del Parione #11, with a facade towards the Arno River, in Florence, region of Tuscany, Italy.

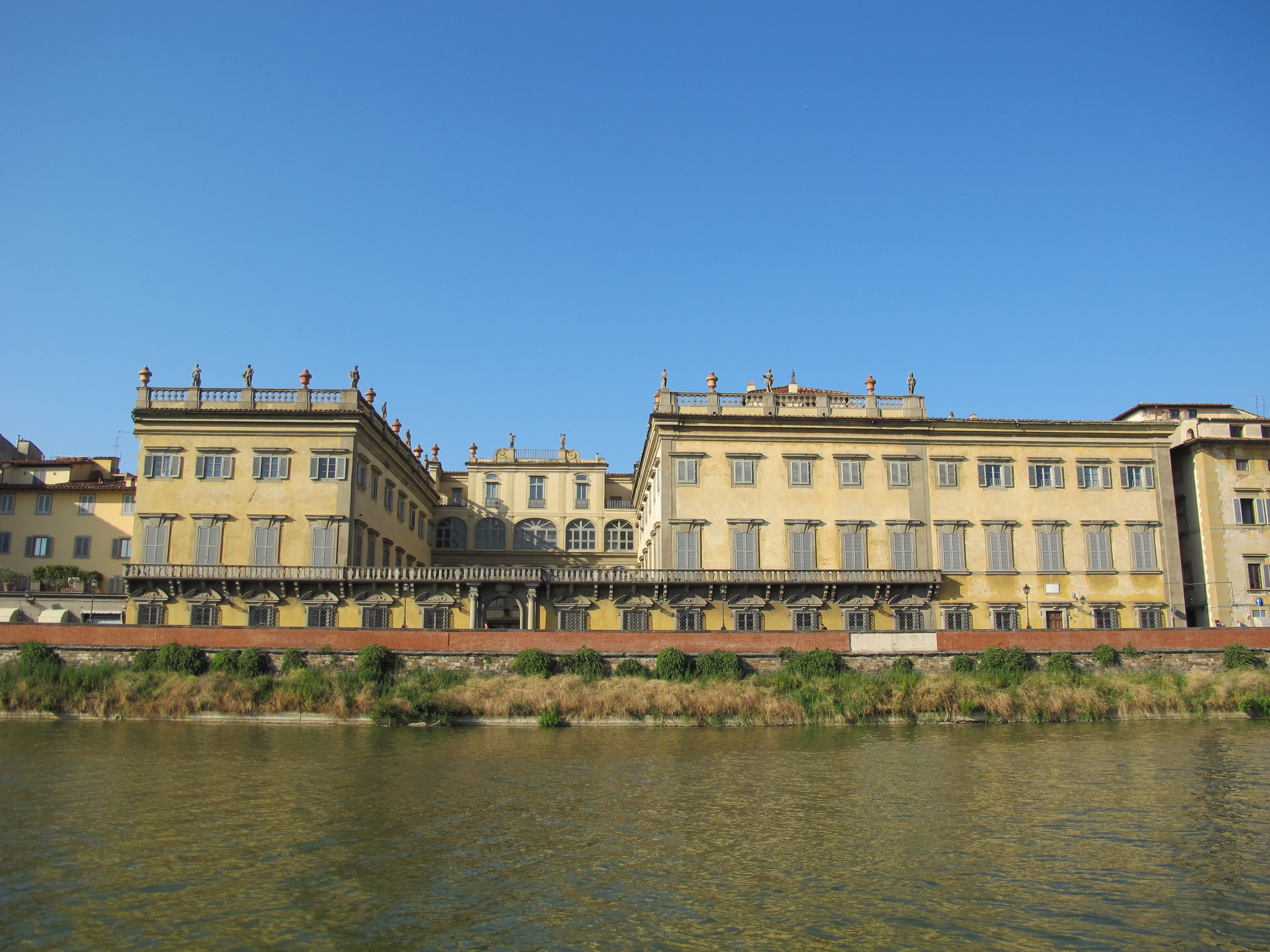
Facade from Oltrarno

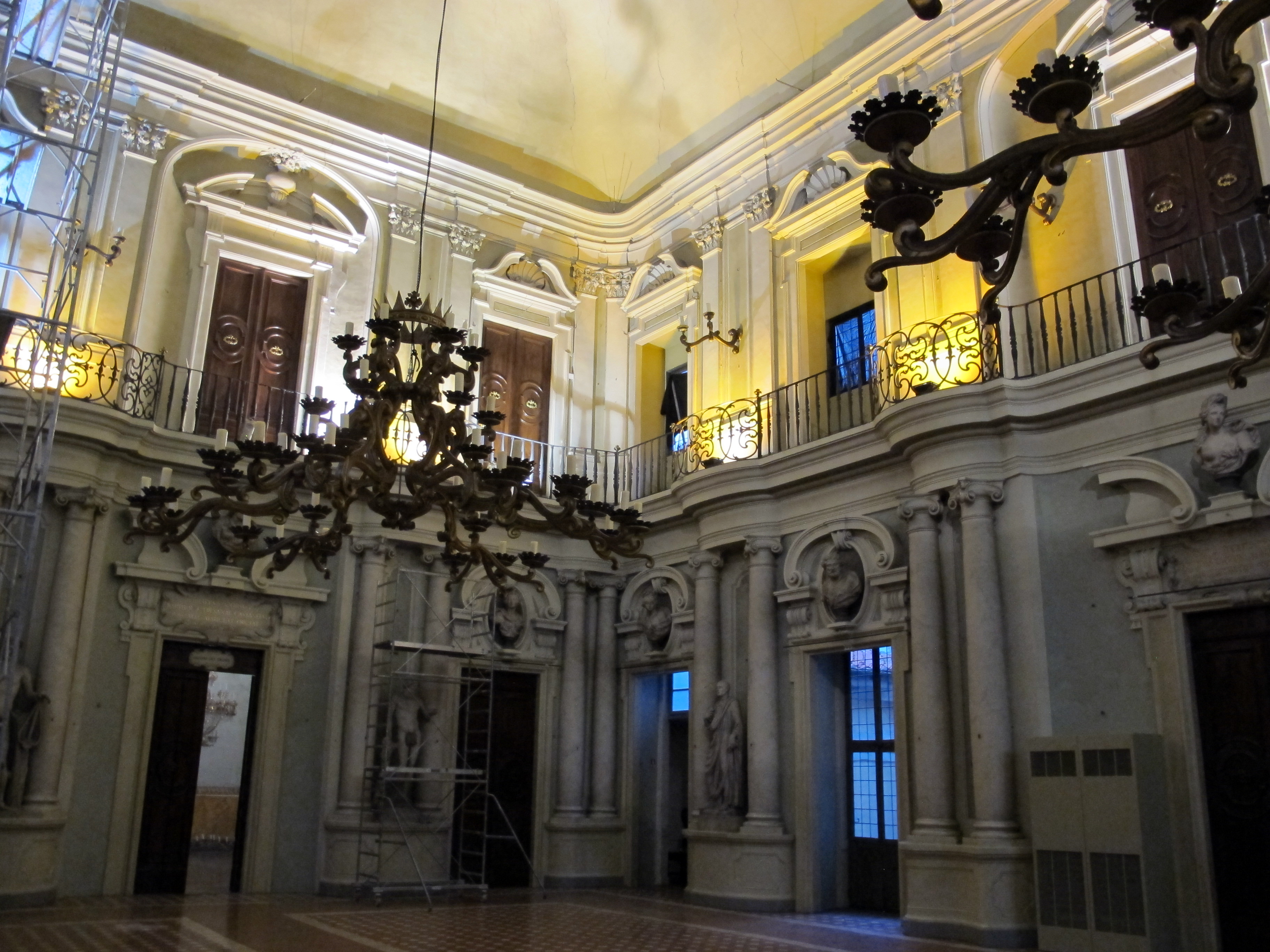
Throne room

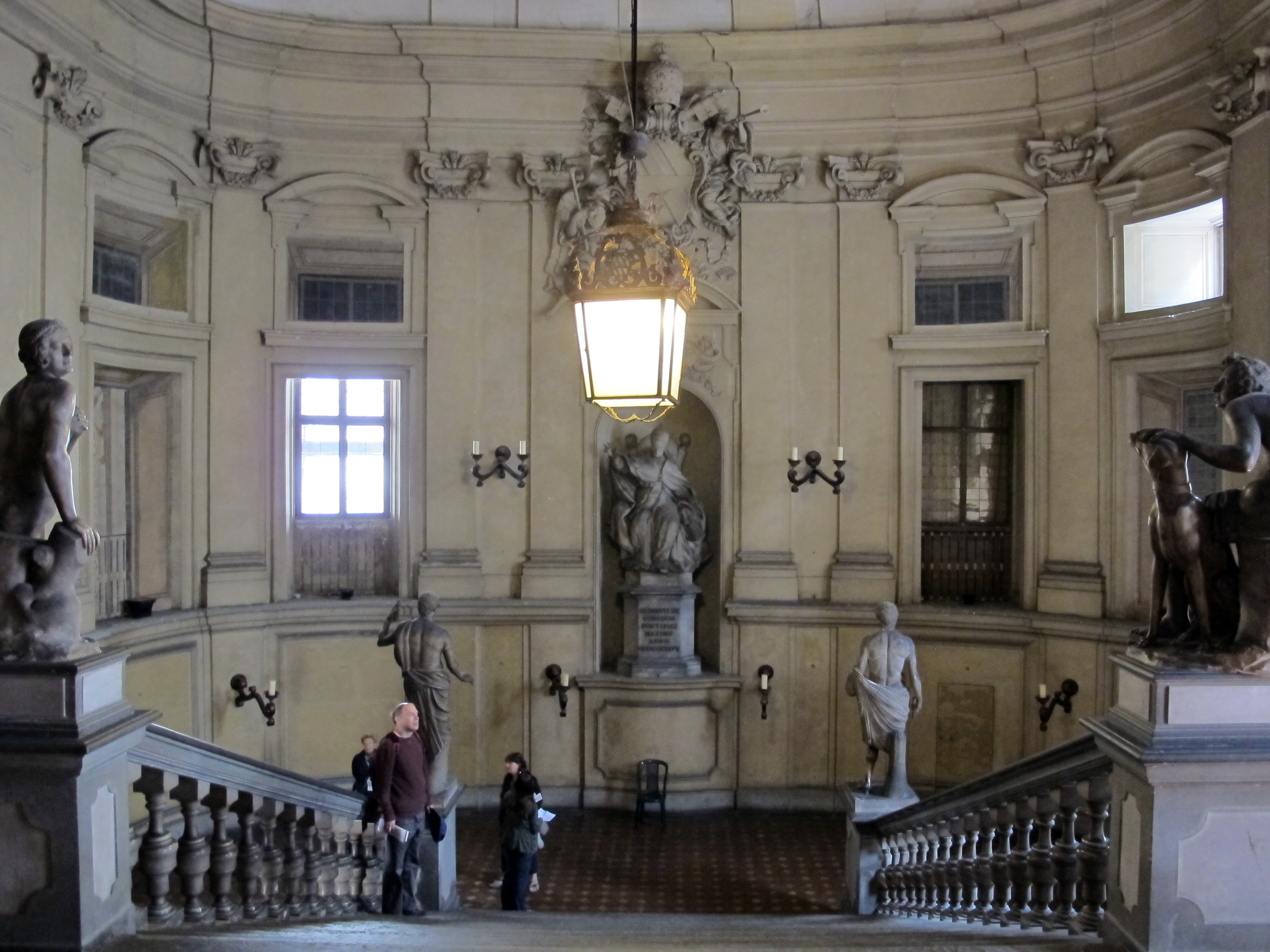
Entrance staircase

== History ==
The site had been appropriated from the Ardinghelli family prior to the 17th century by the Medicis, who built a casino, a small house with gardens extending to the river. In 1649, it was purchased by Maria Maddalena Macchiavelli, the wife of the Marchese Filippo Corsini, from the Grand Duke Ferdinando II de’ Medici.

The palace was constructed during the mid-17th to the 18th centuries, built with one side having U-shape wings facing the Arno to give maximum view of the river. The initial architects were Alfonso Parigi the Younger, followed by Ferdinando Tacca until 1671. Completing the massive structure was Antonio Maria Ferri.

The interiors are elegantly frescoed. The artists include Anton Domenico Gabbiani, Alessandro Gherardini and Pier Dandini. The two storey throne room, designed by Ferri during 1694–1696, covers 320 square feet. Ferri also designed the dramatic entrance staircase. The family's fortunes were to peak with the election of Lorenzo Corsini as Pope Clement XII (1730–1740). The palace still contains remnants of a sculptural collection, but most of the movable artwork was transferred to the family's palazzo in Rome.

The palace is still owned by the Corsini family, and rented out for events.
