= Jacopino Consetti =

Italian painter (1651–1726)

Jacopino Consetti (1651–1726) was an Italian painter.

Born in Modena in 1651, he was active in Este, and was named superintendent of the Galleria Estense. He was the father of the painter Antonio Consetti (1686–1767), who became a pupil of Giovanni Giuseppe dal Sole.

== Sources ==
- "Consetti, Jacopino". Benezit Dictionary of Artists. 2011.
