= Palazzo Corsini, Rome =

Palazzo Corsini
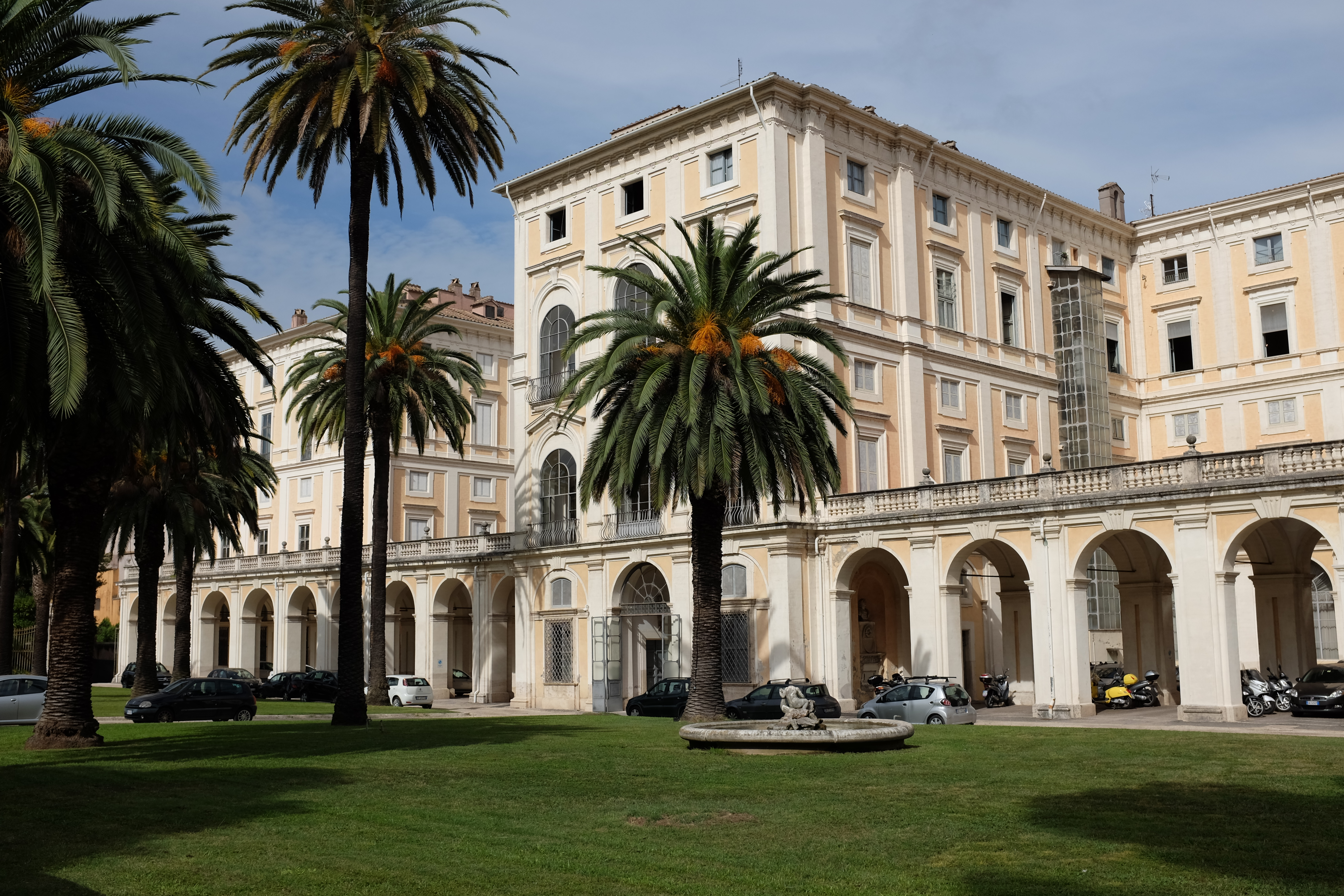
- The rear entrance of the Palazzo Corsini
- Click on the map for a fullscreen view

General information
- Location: Rome, Italy
- Coordinates: 41°53′36″N 12°28′00″E

The Palazzo Corsini is a late-baroque palace in Rome, erected for the Corsini family between 1730 and 1740 as an elaboration of the prior building on the site, a 15th-century villa of the Riario family, based on designs of Ferdinando Fuga. It is located in the Trastevere section of the city, and stands beside the Villa Farnesina.

== Description ==
During 1659–1689, the former Riario palace had hosted the eccentric Christina, Queen of Sweden, who abdicated, converted, and moved to Rome. Under her patronage, this was the site for the first meetings of the Roman Accademia dell'Arcadia.

In 1736, the Florentine Cardinal Neri Maria Corsini, nephew of Pope Clement XII (formerly Cardinal Lorenzo Corsini), acquired the villa and land, and commissioned the structure now standing. During the Napoleonic occupation of Rome, the palace hosted Joseph Bonaparte.

Today, the palace hosts some offices of the National Academy of Science (Accademia dei Lincei) and the Galleria Corsini. The gardens, which rise up the Janiculum hill, are part of the Orto Botanico dell'Università di Roma "La Sapienza", a botanical garden. This also, is not the sole Palazzo Corsini in Italy; there are a handful of palaces belonging to various lines of this Florentine family, which acquired and built this Roman palace, sometime referred to as Palazzo Corsini alla Lungara only upon the ascension of their family member to the papacy. Another Corsini palace of note include the Palazzo Corsini al Parione, facing the banks of the Arno in Florence.

== Galleria Corsini ==
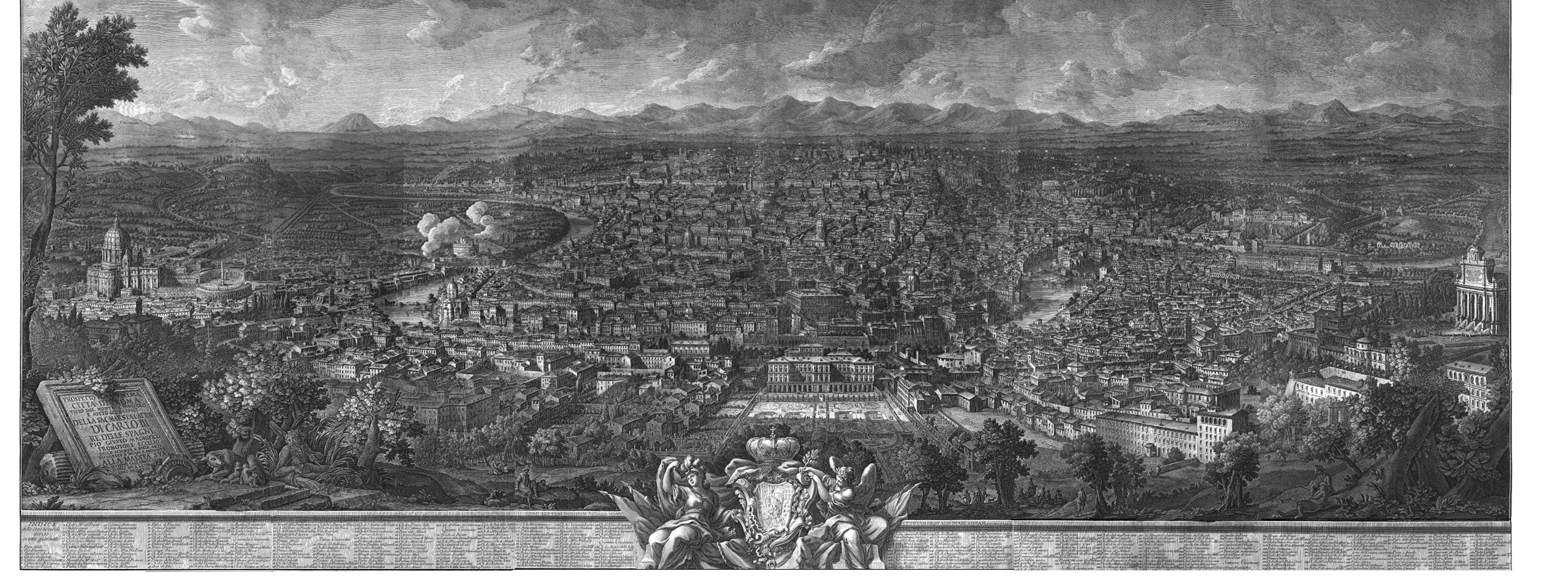
View of Rome from the Gianicolo, di Giuseppe Vasi (al centro il palazzo Corsini)

The Galleria Nazionale d'Arte Antica di Palazzo Corsini or National Gallery of Antique Art in the Corsini Palace is a prominent art museum comprising the first floor of the palace. The national Arte Antica collections (typically post-year 1000 A.D.) in Rome consist of a number of sites, including Palazzo Barberini, Galleria Borghese, and the Palazzo Corsini.

The majority of the major works in the Corsini Gallery collection were donated by the Corsini family, and initially were gathered by the avid 17th century collector, the cardinal Neri Maria Corsini, and added to by other members and from collections of Pope Clement XII and his nephew. In 1883, this palace and its contents were sold to the state, and the collection is displayed in its original location. The collection encompasses the breadth of mainly Italian art from early-Renaissance to late-18th century. It has both religious and historical works, as well as landscapes and genre paintings.

== Partial list of collection ==
Painter	Span	Work	Link
Beato Angelico		Pentecost, Ascension, and Last Judgement	
Cavalier d'Arpino	1560–1640	Resurrection of Lazarus	
Jacopo Bassano	1515–1592	Adoration of the shepherds	
Marco Benefial	1684–1786	Vision of Santa Catherine of Genoa	
Annibale Carracci	1560–1609	St. Francis	
Caravaggio		St. John the Baptist, c. 1600	
Marten van Cleef		Rural festivity	
Donato Creti	1671–1749	Adoration by the Magi	
Donato Creti	1671–1749	Vision of Jacob	
Cristoph van Der Lamen		The rescue	
Anthony van Dyck	1599–1641	Madonna della Paglia	
Marcantonio Franceschini	1648–1729	Ascension of the Magdalen	
Francesco Francia	1450–1517	St. George and the dragon	
Orazio Gentileschi	1563–1646	Madonna and child	
Luca Giordano	1634–1705	Christ before the doctors	
Luca Giordano	1634–1705	Entry of Christ to Jerusalem	
Guercino	1591–1666	Apollo and Marysas	
Hans Hoffmann		The Leper	
Angelica Kauffman		Portrait	
Giovanni Lanfranco		St. Peter and St. Agatha	
Giovanni Lanfranco	1582–1647	Ascension of the Magdalen	
Giovanni Lanfranco	1582–1647	Tamar and Judith	
Master del Solomon's Judgement		Denial by Peter	
Carlo Maratta	1625–1713	Madonna with the Bambino	
Carlo Maratta	1625–1713	Young St John the Baptist & Angels	
Carlo Maratta	1625–1713	Trinity	
Carlo Maratta	1625–1713	Martyrdom of St. Andrew	
Carlo Maratta	1625–1713	Rebecca at the well	
Carlo Maratta	1625–1713	Flight to Egypt	
Agostino Masucci	1690–1768		
Pier Francesco Mola	1612–1666	Homer	
Bartolomé Esteban Murillo		Madonna with the Bambino	
Giovanni Battista Piazzetta	1682–1754	Judith	
Nicolas Poussin		Triumph of Ovid	
Mattia Preti	1613–1699	Tribute of gold	
Mattia Preti	1613–1699	San Bartolomeo	
Guido Reni	1575–1642	Portrait of Beatrice Cenci	
Guido Reni	1575–1642	Magdalen	
Guido Reni	1575–1642	Ecce Homo	
Guido Reni	1575–1642	Salomè with head of the Baptist, St. Joseph and Christ crowned with thorns	
Guido Reni	1575–1642	Herod	
Guido Reni	1575–1642	St. Joseph	
Jusepe de Ribera		Venus and dead Adonis	
Giovan Francesco Romanelli	1610–1662	Adoration by the Magi	
Giovan Francesco Romanelli	1610–1662	Adoration by the Shepherds	
Theodor Rombouts	1597–1637	Concert	
Salvator Rosa	1615–1673		
Peter Paul Rubens	1577–1640	St. Sebastian healed by angels	
Giovanni Battista Salvi (Sassoferrato)	1605–1685		
Andrea del Sarto	1486–1531	Madonna with the Bambino	
Bartolomeo Schedoni	1578–1615		
Johann Heinrich Schonfeld	1609–1683		
Agostino Scilla	1629-1700	Still Life with Fish and Crustaceans	
Gerard Seghers	1591–1651		
Massimo Stanzione	1585–1656		
Nicolas Tournier	1590–1657		
Francesco Trevisani		Martyrdom of St. Lawrence	
Francesco Trevisani		Martyrdom of St. Lucy	
Francesco Trevisani		The Virgin grieving	
Francesco Trevisani		Magdalen	
Lucas Van Uder	1595–1672		
Gaspar Van Wittel	1595–1672		
Simon Vouet		Herod	
Philips Wouwerman	1619–1668		

== Sources ==
- Palazzo Corsini
- Accademia Nazionale dei Lincei, hosted in the Palazzo Corsini and neighboring Villa Farnesina.
- Romecity entry

Preceded by Palazzo Poli	Landmarks of Rome; Palazzo Corsini, Rome	Succeeded by Palazzo Ruspoli, Rome
