= Pope Clement XII =

Head of the Catholic Church from 1730 to 1740

- Bishop of Rome
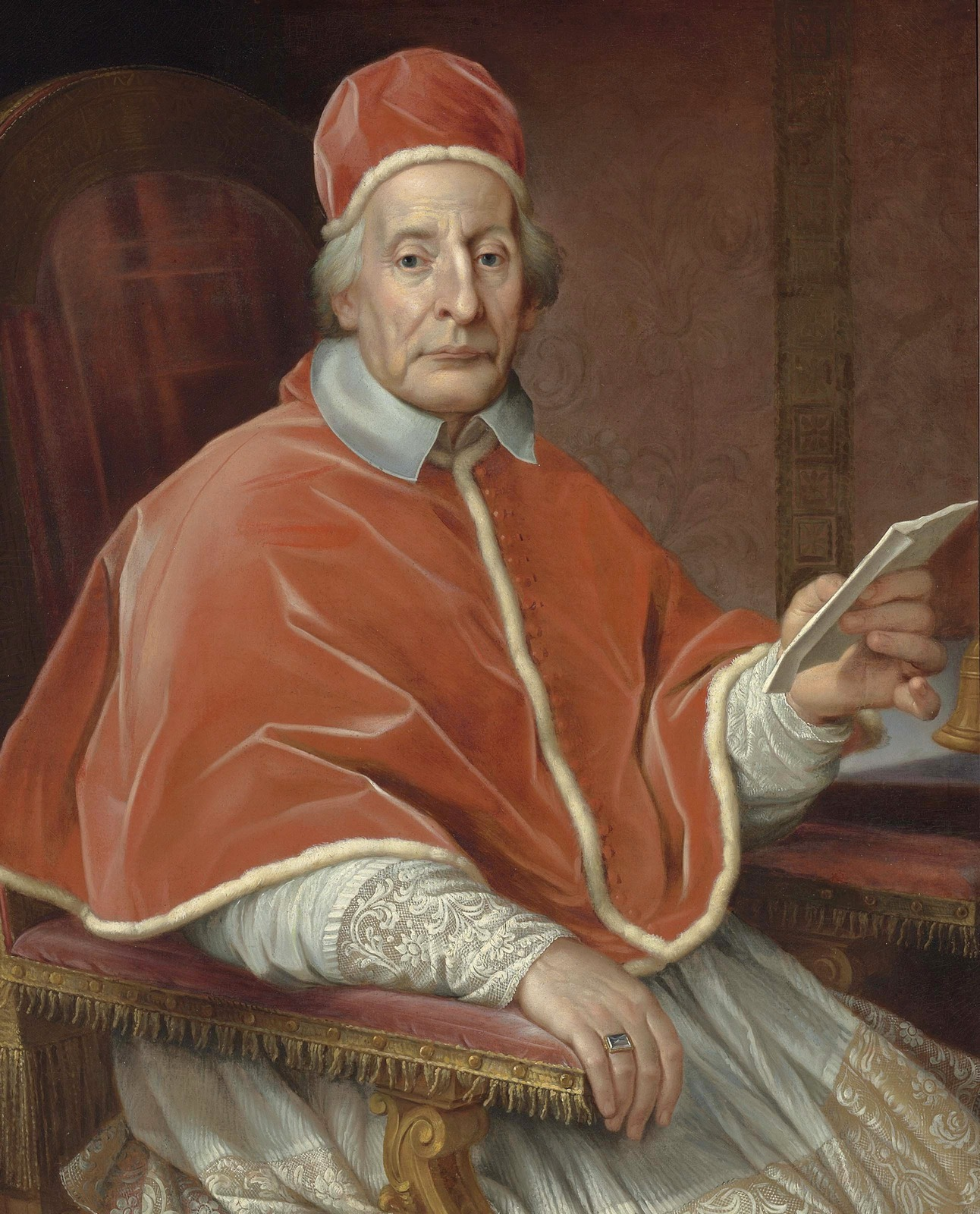
- Portrait by Agostino Masucci, c. 1730–40
- Church: Catholic Church
- Papacy began: 12 July 1730
- Papacy ended: 6 February 1740
- Predecessor: Benedict XIII
- Successor: Benedict XIV
- Previous posts: Titular Archbishop of Nicomedia (1690–1706); Cardinal-Priest of Santa Susanna (1706–1720); Cardinal-Priest of San Pietro in Vincoli (1720–1725); Cardinal-Bishop of Frascati (1725–1730)

Orders
- Consecration: 18 June 1690 by Flavio Chigi
- Created cardinal: 17 May 1706 by Clement XI

Personal details
- Born: Lorenzo Corsini; 7 April 1652 Florence, Grand Duchy of Tuscany
- Died: 6 February 1740 (aged 87) Rome, Papal States
- Motto: Dabis discernere inter malum et bonum (Distinguish between good and evil)
- Signature: Clement XII's signature

- Coat of arms: Clement XII's coat of arms

Pope Clement XII (Latin: Clemens XII; Italian: Clemente XII; 7 April 1652 – 6 February 1740), born Lorenzo Corsini, was head of the Catholic Church and leader of the Papal States from 12 July 1730 to his death in February 1740.

Clement presided over the growth of a surplus in the papal finances. He thus became known for building the new façade of the Basilica of Saint John Lateran, beginning construction of the Trevi Fountain, and the purchase of Cardinal Alessandro Albani's collection of antiquities for the papal gallery. In his 1738 bull In eminenti apostolatus, he provides the first public papal condemnation of Freemasonry.

== Early life ==
Lorenzo Corsini was born in Florence in 1652 as the son of Bartolomeo Corsini, Marquis of Casigliano, and Elisabetta Strozzi, the sister of the Duke of Bagnuolo. Both of his parents belonged to the old Florentine nobility. He was a nephew of Cardinal Neri Corsini and was a distant relative of Saint Andrew Corsini.

Corsini studied at the Jesuit Roman College in Rome and also at the University of Pisa where he earned a doctorate in both civil law and canon law.

== Career ==
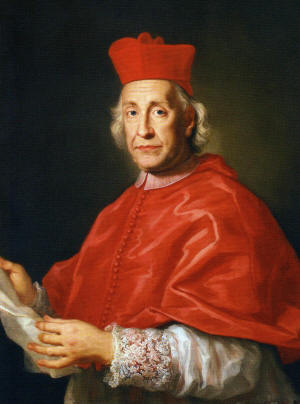
Cardinal Lorenzo Corsini, by Francesco Trevisani

Corsini practised law under the able direction of his uncle, Cardinal Neri Corsini. After the death of his uncle and his father, in 1685, Corsini, now thirty-three, would have become head of the Corsini. Instead, he renounced his right of primogeniture and from Pope Innocent XI (1676–1689) he purchased, according to the custom of the time, for 30,000 scudi, a position of prelatial rank and devoted his wealth and leisure to the enlargement of the library bequeathed to him by his uncle. Corsini's home on the Piazza Navona was the centre of Rome's scholarly and artistic life.

In 1690 he was made titular Archbishop of Nicomedia and chosen nuncio to Vienna, receiving a dispensation from Pope Alexander VIII since he had not yet been ordained a priest. He did not proceed to the imperial court, because Leopold I, the Holy Roman Emperor, maintained that he had the right to select the nuncio from a list of three names furnished by the pope.

In 1696, Corsini was appointed treasurer-general and governor of the Castel Sant'Angelo. His good fortune increased during the pontificate of Pope Clement XI (1700–1721), who employed his talents as a courtier and named him Cardinal-Priest of Santa Susanna on 17 May 1706, retaining his services as papal treasurer.

He advanced still further under Pope Benedict XIII (1724–1730), who made him Prefect of the Apostolic Signatura, a judicial branch of the Roman Curia. He was successively appointed as the Cardinal-Priest of San Pietro in Vincoli and Cardinal-Bishop of Frascati.

== Pontificate ==
Papal styles of Pope Clement XII
- Reference style: His Holiness
- Spoken style: Your Holiness
- Religious style: Holy Father
- Posthumous style: None

=== Papal election ===
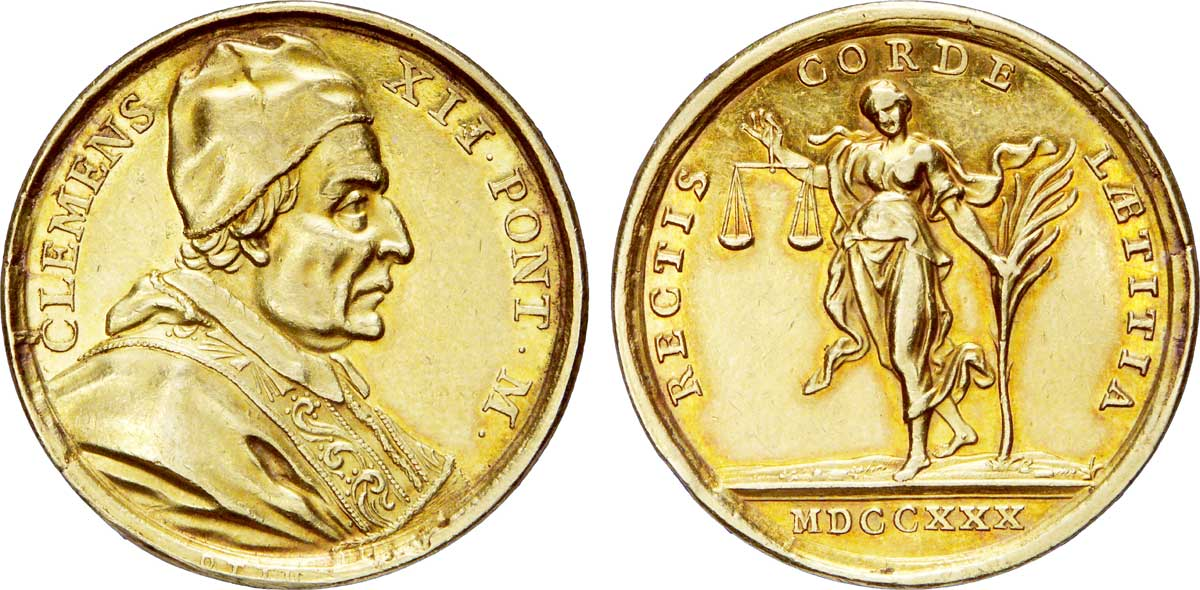
Clement XII, 1730

Under Benedict XIII, the finances of the Papal States had been delivered into the hands of Cardinal Niccolò Coscia and other members of the curia, who had drained the financial resources of the see. Benedict died in 1730, and in the conclave that followed his death, after deliberating for four months, the College of Cardinals selected Corsini, 78 years old and with failing eyesight, who had held all the important offices of the Roman Curia. No pope has since been elected at an older age than Clement XII when he was elected. (Note: Benedict XVI is also often listed as being elected at 78, but when elected in 2005 he was two months younger than Clement.)

As a Corsini, with his mother a Strozzi, the new pope represented a family at the highest level of Florentine society, with a cardinal in every generation for the previous hundred years.

On 1 May 1730, several of the cardinals initially settled upon electing Cardinal Gianantonio Davia but had been unable to secure the necessary support. To that end, they refocused their efforts on getting Corsini elected, securing him 31 votes. Corsini, however, was not seriously considered as a candidate until about early July when the candidacy of Pietro Marcellino Corradini started to waver. Meanwhile, the French, Spanish, and Germans were perfectly amenable to Corsini's election.

Corsini took his papal name in memorial to Pope Clement XI, who created him cardinal.

=== Finances ===
His first moves as Pope Clement XII were to restore the papal finances. He demanded restitution from the ministers who had abused the confidence of his predecessor. The chief culprit, Cardinal Niccolò Coscia, was heavily fined, excommunicated and sentenced to ten years' imprisonment. Papal finances were also improved through reviving the public lottery, which had been suppressed by the severe morality of Benedict XIII. Soon money poured into Clement XII's treasury, an annual sum amounting to nearly a half million scudi, enabling him to undertake the extensive building programs for which he is chiefly remembered, but which he was never able to see.

=== Art and architecture ===
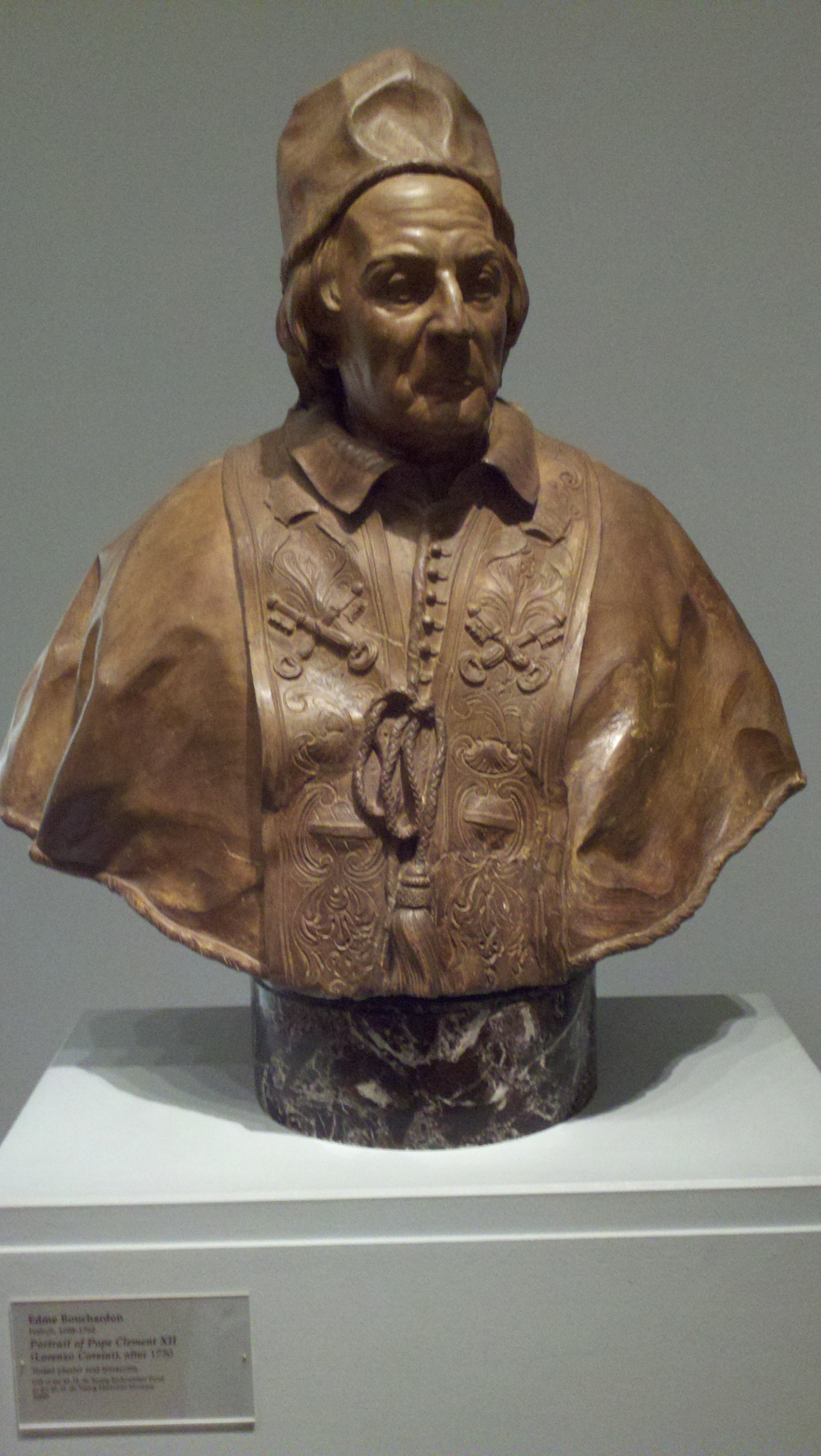
Bust of Clement XII by Edme Bouchardon

A competition for the majestic façade of the Basilica of Saint John Lateran was won by architect Alessandro Galilei. The façade he designed is perhaps more palatial than ecclesiastic, and was finished by 1735. Clement XII erected in that ancient basilica a magnificent chapel dedicated to his 14th-century kinsman, St. Andrew Corsini. He restored the Arch of Constantine and built the Palazzo della Consulta on the Quirinal Hill. He purchased from Cardinal Alessandro Albani for 60,000 scudi a famous collection of statues, inscriptions, etc., and opened it to the public as the Capitoline Museums. He paved the streets of Rome and the roads leading from the city and widened the Via del Corso. He began the triumphant Baroque Trevi Fountain, one of the noted ornaments of Rome. Under his reign, a port was built at Ancona, with a highway that gave easy access to the interior. He drained the malarial marshes of the Chiana near Lake Trasimeno.The pope founded in 1732 the Italo-Albanian College Library of San Demetrio Corone in Calabria.

=== Foreign policy ===
Politically, however, this was not a successful papacy among the secular powers of Europe. When the attempt of Papal forces to take over the ancient independent Republic of San Marino failed, Clement XII disavowed the arbitrary action of his legate, Cardinal Giulio Alberoni, in seizing San Marino, and restored its independence. He was also rebuffed in Papal claims over the Duchy of Parma and Piacenza.

In August 1730, he gave permission for Victor Amadeus II of Savoy to carry out a morganatic marriage to Anna Canalis di Cumiana. Victor Amadeus II subsequently abdicated his throne, causing great unrest in Savoy.

=== Ecclesial activities ===
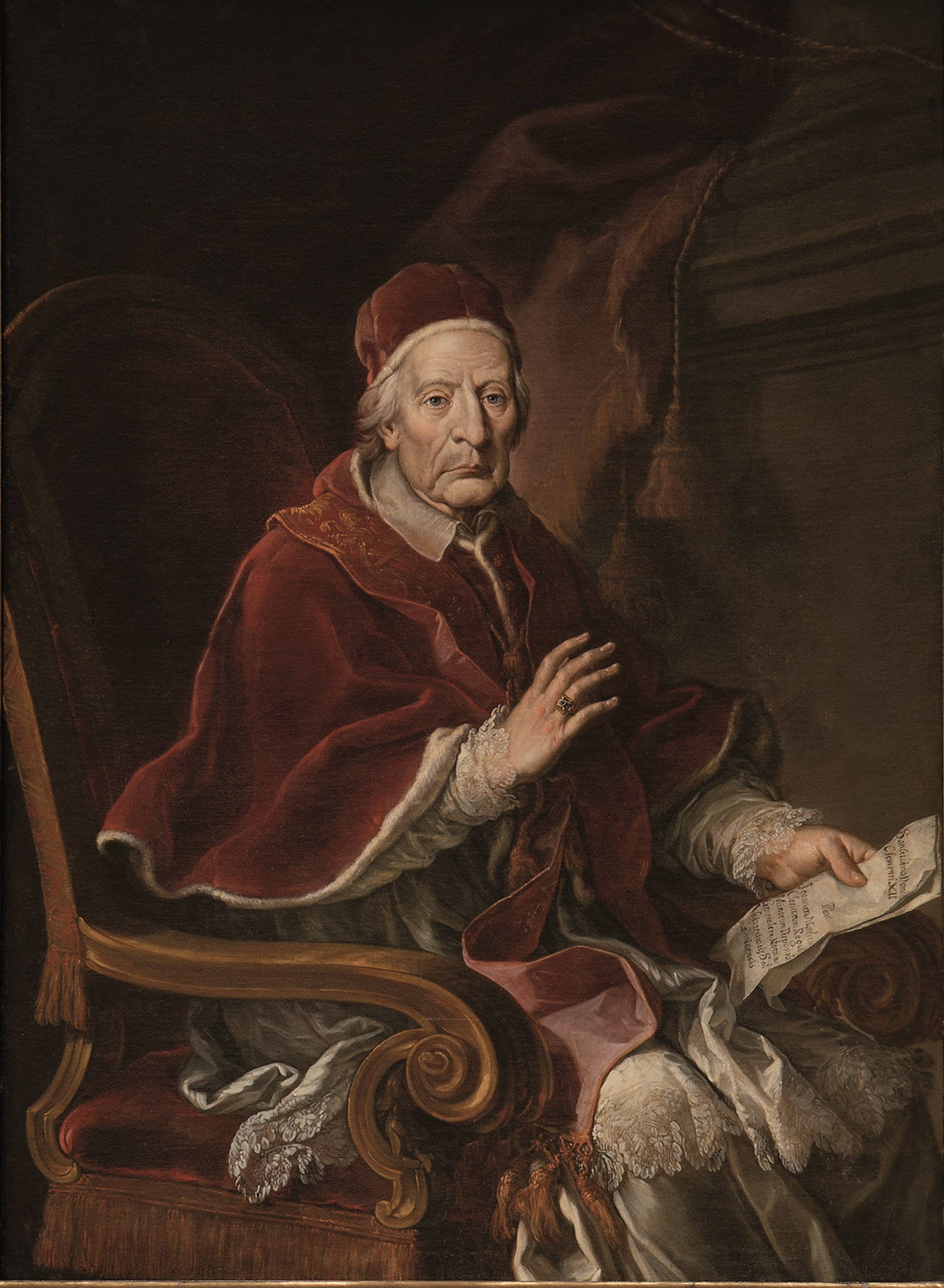
Papa Clemente XII, unknown Spanish artist (oil on canvas, 1739, University of Salamanca)

In ecclesiastic affairs he issued In eminenti apostolatus, the first papal decree against the Freemasons, on 28 April 1738. He canonized Saint Vincent de Paul and proceeded with vigour against the French Jansenists. He campaigned for the reunion of the Roman and Orthodox churches, received the Patriarch of the Coptic Church and persuaded the Armenian Patriarch to remove the anathema against the Council of Chalcedon and Pope Leo I (440–461). He dispatched Joseph Simeon Assemani to the East for the twofold purpose of continuing his search for manuscripts and presiding as legate over the Lebanese Council of 1736. He created the youngest Cardinal ever when, on 19 December 1735, he named Luis Antonio Jaime de Borbón y Farnesio, Royal Infante of Spain, age 8, to the Sacred College.

Though he was blind and compelled to keep to his bed, from which he gave audiences and transacted affairs of state, he surrounded himself with capable officials, many of them his Corsini relatives, but he did little for his family except to purchase and enlarge the palace built in Trastevere for the Riarii, and now known as the Palazzo Corsini (the seat of the Accademia dei Lincei). In 1754, his nephew, Cardinal Neri Maria Corsini, founded therein the famous Corsini Library.

=== Consistories ===
Clement XII created 35 cardinals in fifteen consistories held throughout his pontificate. The first individual he raised into the cardinalate was his nephew Neri Maria Corsini while he also raised his future successor Carlo della Torre di Rezzonico (Pope Clement XIII) to the cardinalate. He also raised his nephew Giovanni Antonio Guadagni to the cardinalate in 1731.

=== Canonizations and beatifications ===
The pope named five new saints during his reign, the most notable being Vincent de Paul. He also beatified eight others, including his predecessor Pope Benedict XIII.

== Death and burial ==
The tomb of Clement XII

Clement XII died on 6 February 1740 at 9:30 am due to complications from gout. His remains were transferred to his tomb in the Basilica of Saint John Lateran on 20 July 1742. Pope Clement XII's tomb is in the Capella Corsini of the Basilica of St. John Lateran and was completed by the sculptors Giovanni Battista Maini and Carlo Monaldi. His bust was completed by Filippo della Valle.

== See also ==
- Cardinals created by Clement XII
- List of popes

== Notes ==
Catholic Church titles
Preceded by Benedict XIII	Pope; 12 July 1730 – 6 February 1740	Succeeded by Benedict XIV
