= Neri Maria Corsini =

Italian nobleman and cardinal

His Eminence Neri Maria Corsini
- Prefect of the Apostolic Signatura
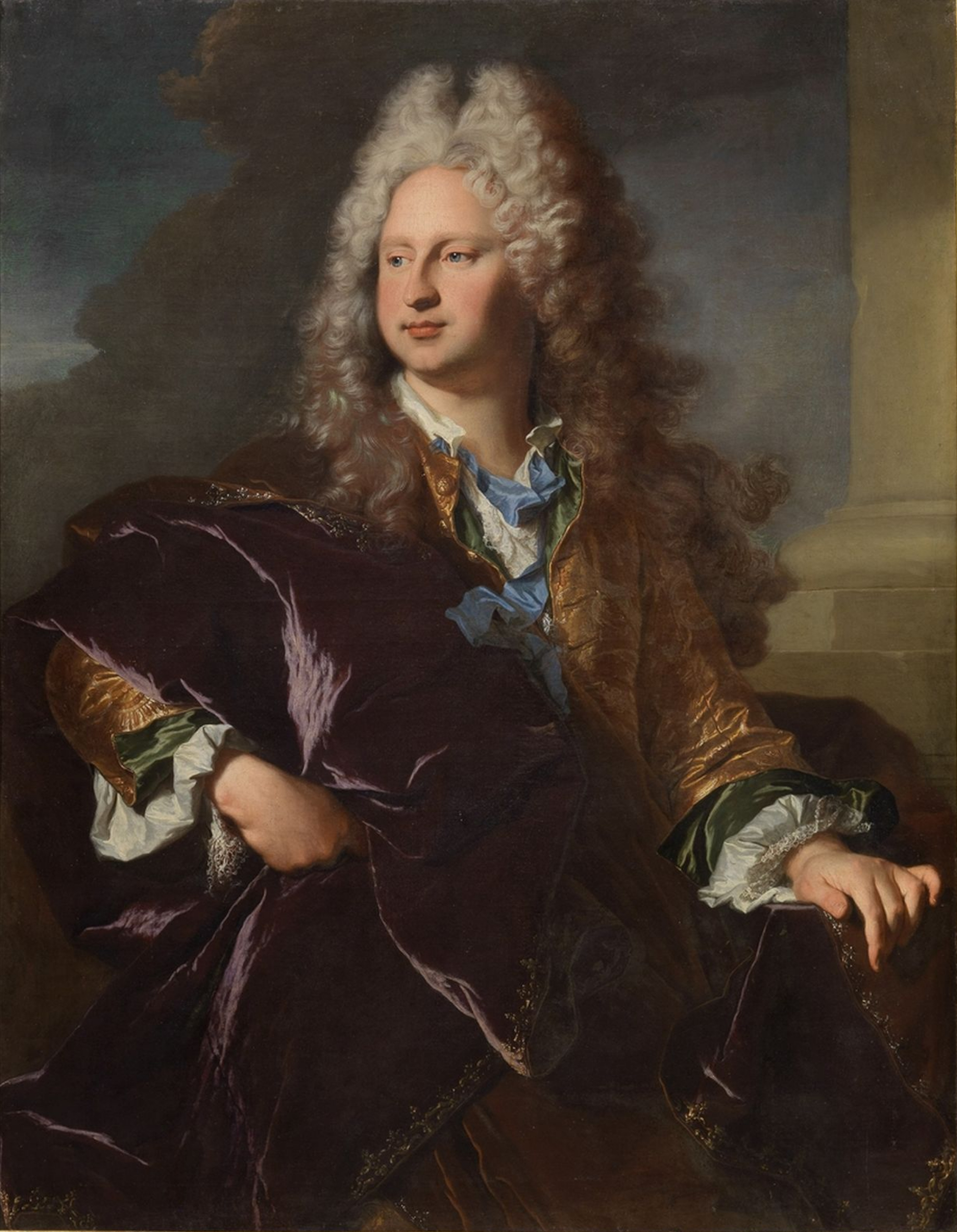
- Portrait of Neri Maria Corsini by Hyacinthe Rigaud, 1710
- Church: Roman Catholic Church
- Appointed: 2 March 1733
- Term ended: 6 December 1770
- Predecessor: Fabrizio Spada
- Successor: Leonardo Antonelli
- Other posts: Archpriest of the Lateran Basilica (1740–1770); Cardinal-deacon of Sant'Eustachio (1737–1770)

Orders
- Created cardinal: 14 August 1730 by Pope Clement XII
- Rank: Cardinal-deacon

Personal details
- Born: 19 May 1685 Florence, Grand Duchy of Tuscany
- Died: 6 December 1770 (aged 85) Rome, Papal States

Neri Maria Corsini (19 May 1685 – 6 December 1770) was an Italian nobleman, a Catholic priest and cardinal and a leading patron of the arts. A scion from an old Florentine family, he began his career in the service of the Grand Dukes of Tuscany and spent much time at the European courts. After moving to Rome in 1726, he lived with his uncle, Cardinal Lorenzo Corsini, who was elected Pope in 1730 and took the name Clement XII. His uncle appointed him as a cardinal. When the Pope became partially incapacitated, Neri Maria took on a key role in the papal reign of Clement XII. He dealt with the politics and diplomacy of the Holy See as well as large building projects in Rome. He took measures to protect and improve the cultural heritage, such as by opening the Capitoline Museums to the public in 1734.

== Life ==
Born in Florence, Corsini was the second of the two sons of Filippo Corsini and Lucrezia Rinuccini of the influential Corsini family. He travelled widely through Europe between 1709–1713. Following this, he was appointed to serve as the ambassador of the Grand Duchy of Tuscany to France in 1709, followed by serving that same office in England. He acted as Minister Plenipotentiary to the negotiations which resulted in the Treaty of the Hague in 1720.

After the death of his patron, Grand Duke Cosimo III de' Medici in 1723, Corsini moved to Rome, where in 1726 he became the secretary of his uncle, Cardinal Lorenzo Corsini, serving him until his election as pope, under the name of Pope Clement XII in 1730. His uncle then named him a cardinal deacon in pectore at the consistory of 14 August 1730. His creation as cardinal was made public in December of that same year, and he was given as his titular church the Church of S. Adriano - which was deconsecrated in 1946 and returned to its archaeological state as the Roman Senate House.

After this, Corsini donated the library of the Agonal Palace, his uncle's former residence, to the Holy See and opened his library to the public. The Vatican Librarian Giovanni Gaetano Bottari was his advisor. He then exercised several roles in the Roman Curia. He was also persuaded to seek Holy Orders, becoming a priest in 1733, after which he was named Prefect of the Supreme Tribunal of the Apostolic Signatura.

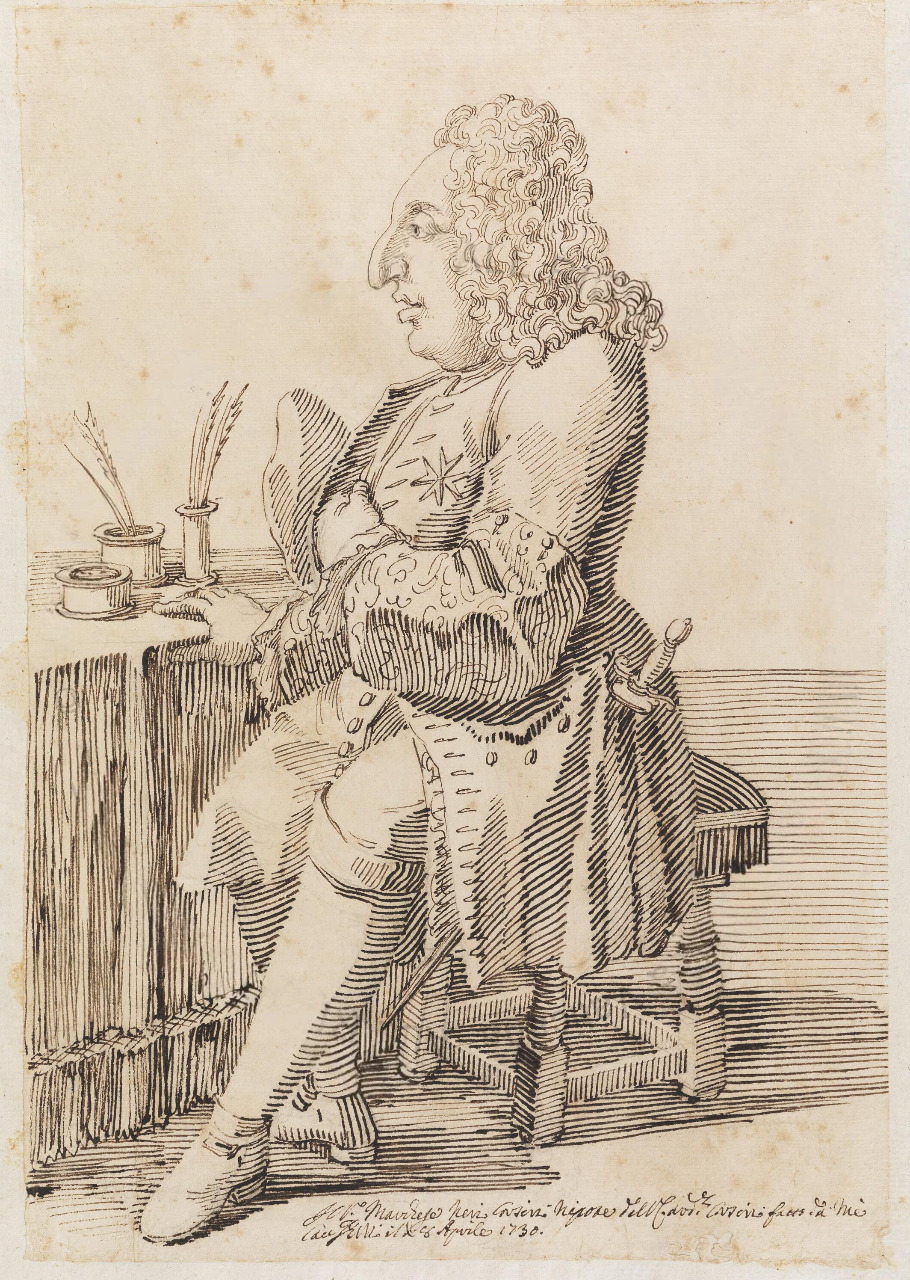
Caricature of Neri Maria Corsini by Pier Leone Ghezzi, 1730

In 1736, Corsini bought an ancient estate in Rome on which he had the Palazzo Corsini built. He opted to exchange his titular church for that of the Basilica of Sant'Eustachio, at which he had an elaborate altar built to hold the remains of its patron saint. His uncle called upon him to settle a dispute with the Kingdom of Portugal which resulted in a concordat with that state. In 1737, he was named the Protector of Ireland.

In the artistic field, he promoted the decoration of palaces and churches, supporting various artists, especially Tuscan and Roman, but also talented foreigners. He was the protector and benefactor of the famous painter Jacopo Zoboli; thanks to his intervention on behalf of the King of Naples, Charles III of Spain, the painter was hosted in the Palazzo Farnese in Rome from 1738 to 1760, where, in addition to an apartment, he was provided with a large studio for painting. The other painters protected or favoured by Cardinal Neri Maria Corsini were: Agostino Masucci, Pier Leone Ghezzi, Giovanni Paolo Panini and Sebastiano Conca.

Corsini took part in the conclave of 1740 at which Pope Benedict XIV was elected, by whom he was immediately named Archpriest of the Basilica of St. John Lateran (1740-1770). He also participated in the Conclave of 1758, which elected Pope Clement XIII, and the Conclave of 1769, which elected Pope Clement XIV. From 1753 until his death in 1770, he was Secretary of the Roman Inquisition.

Corsini died at his palace on 6 December 1770, at the age of eighty-five. He was buried in the Corsini Chapel in the Basilica of St. John Lateran.

== Sources ==
- Page on cardinal Neri Maria Corsini, by Salvador Miranda, The Cardinals of the Holy Roman Church Retrieved: 2016-03-12.
- Mario Guarnacci, Vitae et res gestae Pontificum Romanorum et S.R.E. Cardinalium Tomus secundus (Romae Venantii Monaldini, 1751), pp. 603–606.
- Lorenzo Cardella, Memorie storiche de' cardinali della Santa Romana Chiesa Volume VIII (Roma: Pagliari 1794), pp. 244–246.
- Enzo Borsellino, Palazzo Corsini alla Lungara: storia di un cantiere (Fasano: Schena, 1988).
- Enzo Borsellino, Palazzo Corsini: Roma (Roma: Istituto poligrafico e Zecca dello Stato, Libreria dello Stato, 1995).
- George L. Williams, Papal Genealogy: The Families and Descendants of the Popes (Jefferson, N.C., USA: McFarland, 2004), pp. 127–128.

== See also ==
- Pope Clement XII
- Sebastiano Conca
- Jacopo Zoboli
- Angelo Maria Querini
