= Sigismund II Augustus =

Ruler of Poland and Lithuania from 1529 to 1572

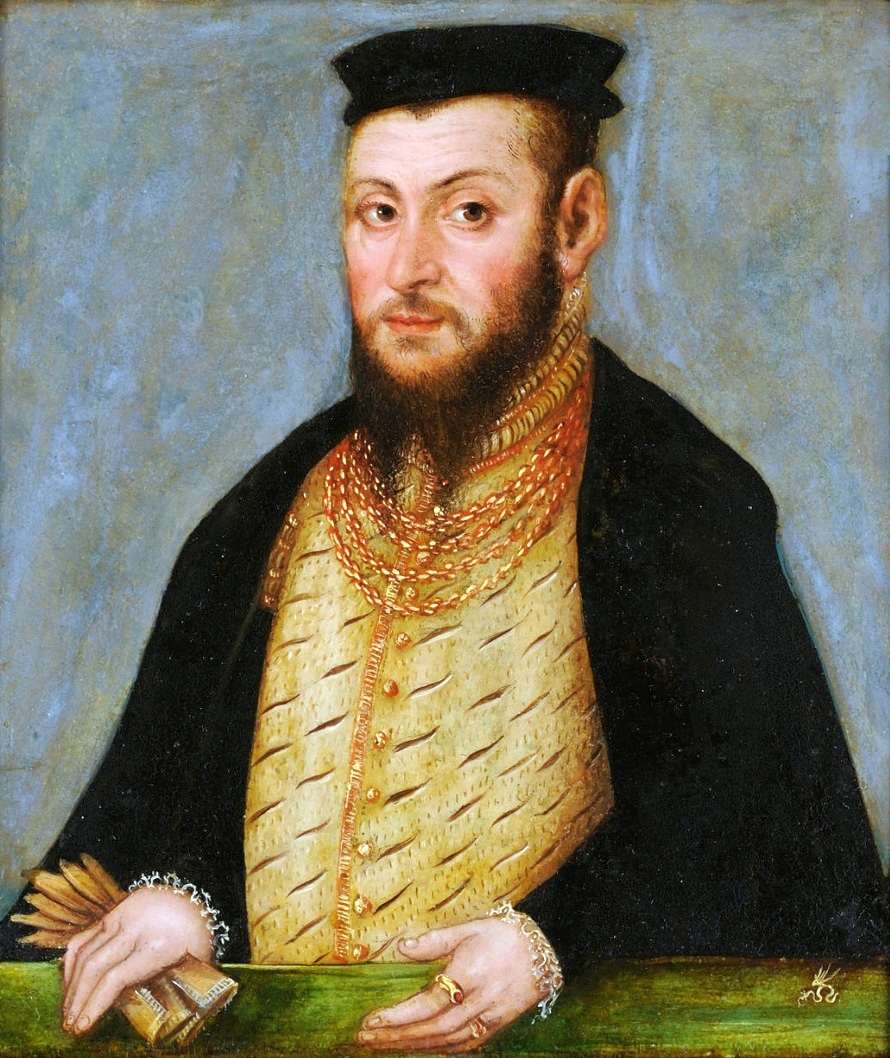
- Portrait by Lucas Cranach the Younger, 1553

King of Poland Grand Duke of Lithuania
- Reign: 18 October/18 December 1529 (Note: Proclaimed Grand Duke on 18 October, proclaimed King on 18 December.) – 7 July 1572
- Coronation: 20 February 1530
- Predecessor: Sigismund I the Old
- Successor: Henry of Valois (in 1573)
- Co-ruler: Sigismund I the Old (1529–1548)
- Born: 1 August 1520; Kraków, Poland
- Died: 7 July 1572 (aged 51); Knyszyn, Poland-Lithuania
- Burial: 10 February 1574; Wawel Cathedral, Kraków, Poland
- Spouses: Elizabeth of Austria (m. 1543; died 1545) Barbara Radziwiłł (m. 1547; died 1551) Catherine of Austria (m. 1553; died 1572)
- Issue Detail: Barbara Woroniecka (illegitimate)
- Dynasty: Jagiellon
- Father: Sigismund I the Old
- Mother: Bona Sforza
- Religion: Roman Catholicism
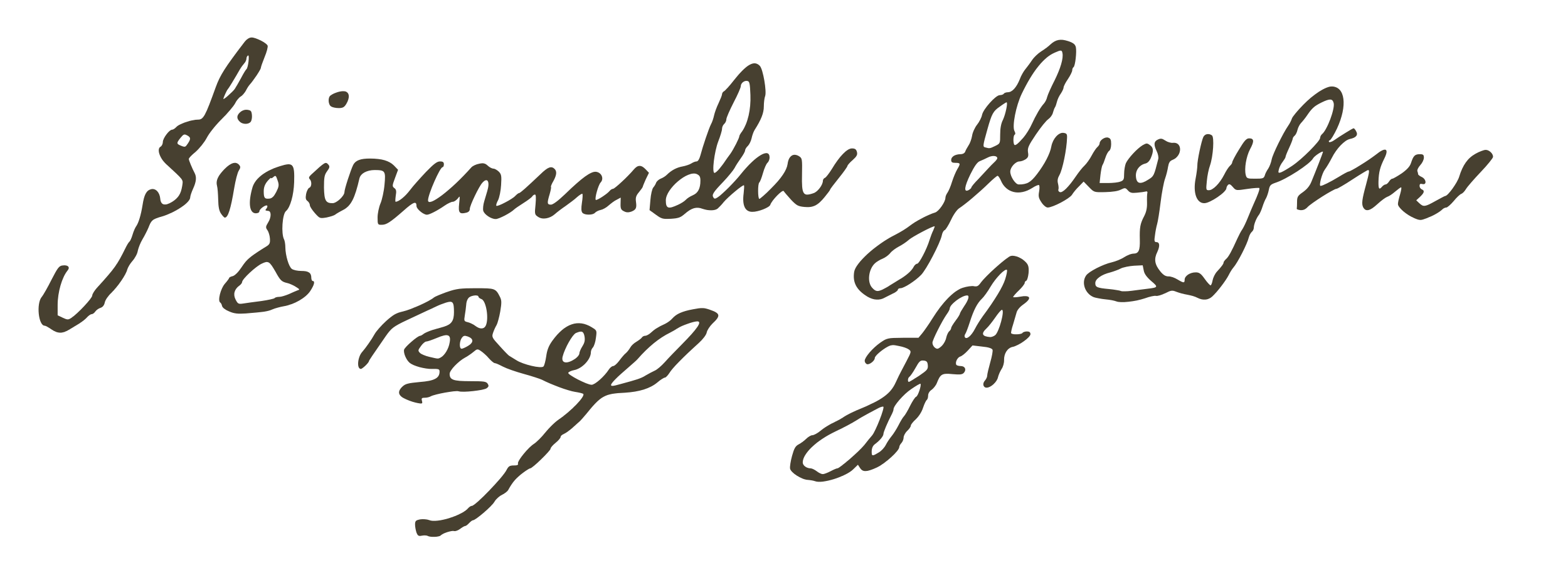
- Signature

Sigismund II Augustus (Polish: Zygmunt II August, Lithuanian: Žygimantas Augustas; 1 August 1520 – 7 July 1572) was King of Poland and Grand Duke of Lithuania, the son of Sigismund I the Old, whom Sigismund II succeeded in 1548. He was the first ruler of the Polish–Lithuanian Commonwealth and the last male monarch from the Jagiellonian dynasty.

Sigismund was the elder of two sons of Italian-born Bona Sforza and Sigismund the Old, and the only one to survive infancy. From the beginning, he was groomed and extensively educated as a successor. In 1529, he was chosen as king in vivente rege election while his father was still alive. Sigismund Augustus continued a tolerance policy towards minorities and maintained peaceful relations with neighbouring countries, with the exception of the Northern Seven Years' War, which aimed to secure Baltic trade. Under his patronage, culture flourished in Poland; he was a collector of tapestries from the Low Countries and collected military memorabilia as well as swords, armour, and jewellery. Sigismund Augustus' rule is widely considered the apex of the Polish Golden Age; he established the first regular Polish navy and the first regular postal service in Poland, known today as Poczta Polska. In 1569, he oversaw the signing of the Union of Lublin between Poland and the Grand Duchy of Lithuania, which formed the Polish–Lithuanian Commonwealth.

Sigismund II Augustus married three times; his first wife, Elizabeth of Austria, died in 1545 at just 18. He was then involved in several relationships with mistresses, the most famous being Barbara Radziwiłł, who became Sigismund II's second wife and Queen of Poland in spite of his mother's disapproval. The marriage was deemed scandalous and was fiercely opposed by the royal court and the nobility. Barbara died five months after her coronation, due to serious illness. Sigismund finally married Catherine of Austria. Neither marriage resulted in living children.

Sigismund II Augustus was the last male member of the Jagiellonian dynasty. Following the death of his sister Anna in 1596, the Jagiellonian dynasty came to an end.

== Early life ==
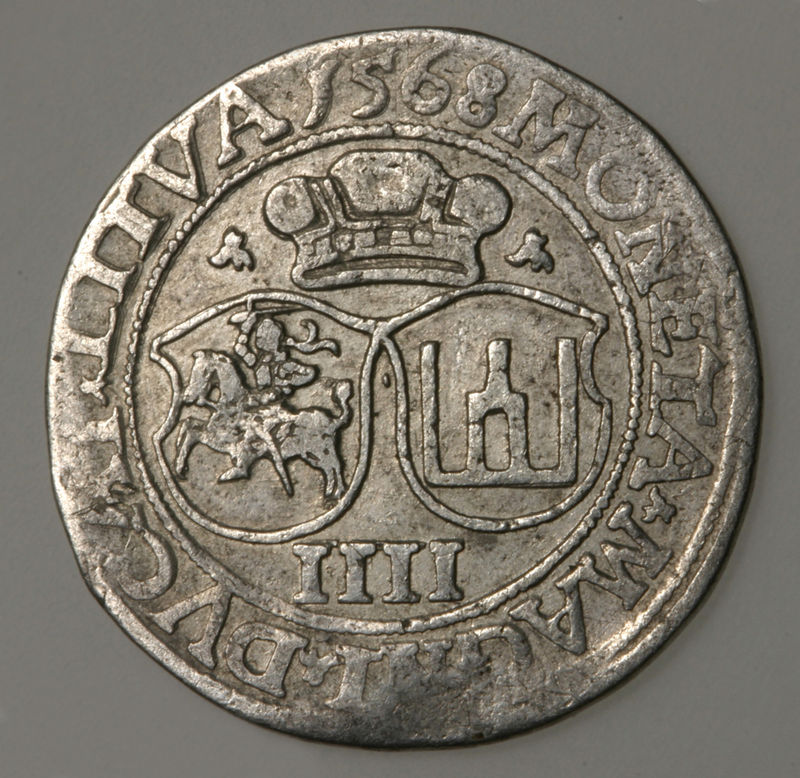
A 1568 Lithuanian coin of Sigismund II Augustus with the coat of arms of Lithuania, Gediminas's Cap, and Columns of Gediminas

Sigismund Augustus was born in Kraków on 1 August 1520 to Sigismund I the Old and Bona Sforza of Milan. His paternal grandparents were Casimir IV Jagiellon, King of Poland, and Elizabeth of Austria. Sigismund's maternal grandparents, Gian Galeazzo Sforza and Isabella of Aragon, daughter of King Alfonso II of Naples, both ruled the Duchy of Milan until Sforza's suspicious death in 1494.

Throughout his youth, Sigismund Augustus was under the careful watch of his mother, Bona. Being the only surviving legitimate male heir to the Polish throne throughout his father's reign, he was well educated and taught by the most renowned scholars in the country. It was also his mother's wish to name her son Augustus, either to commemorate the month he was born or after the first Roman Emperor Augustus. The tradition of adopting Augustus as a second or middle name was also observed during the coronation of Stanisław Antoni Poniatowski, who became King Stanisław II Augustus in 1764. Sigismund II Augustus was sometimes referred to as Augustus I for being the first Polish-Lithuanian monarch to bear the name “Augustus”, with the other two were Augustus II the Strong and Augustus III the Saxon.

== Coregency with Sigismund the Old ==
As Crown of the Kingdom of Poland was elective monarchy, Sigismund I the Old and Bona tried to secure their son's succession and named him nominal co-ruler during his father's life (vivente rege). On 18 October 1529, Sigismund Augustus was inaugurated as Grand Duke of Lithuania and the ceremony was held in the Vilnius grand ducal palace. He was named King of Poland alongside his father on 18 December the same year. On 20 February 1530, the nine-year-old Sigismund Augustus was crowned the King of Poland by Primate Jan Łaski. While Polish nobility acknowledged Sigismund Augustus as his father's coregent, the vivente rege election was subsequently greatly criticized. The nobles were supportive of continuation of current dynasty, however they wished to have control over who ascends the throne, believing it would lead to the royal children being raised as more competent than in case they would inherit automatically. Their displeasure with succession politics of the royal family eventually became one of the reason of the Lwów Rokosz in 1537.

Sigismund II Augustus began his reign as active Grand Duke in 1544 and initially opposed the Polish–Lithuanian union, thus hoping to leave his throne to his heirs, as the Lithuanian throne was hereditary, while the Polish one was not, hence the grasp of the Jagiellon dynasty on Poland was uncertain.

=== First marriage ===
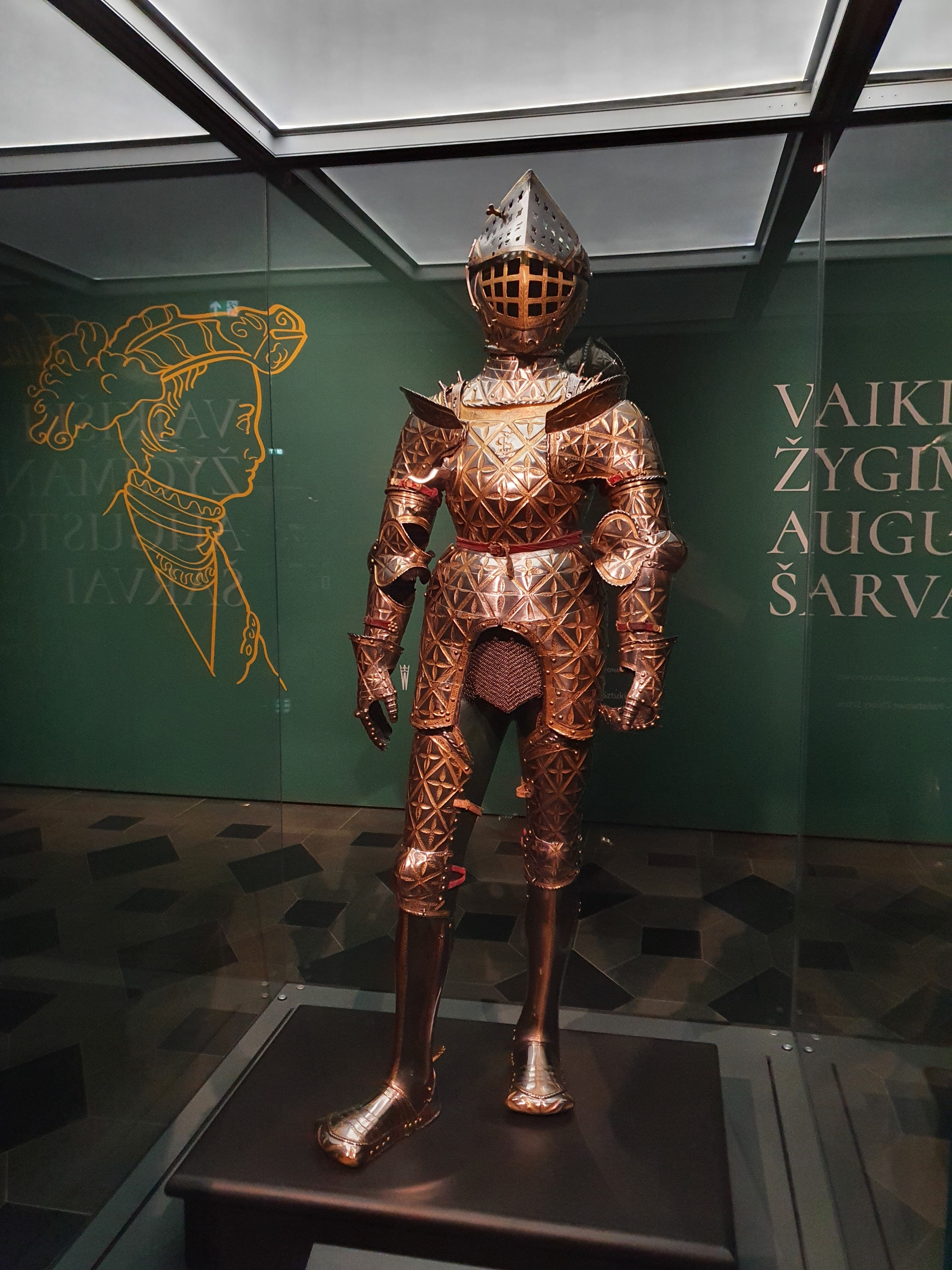
Child armour of Sigismund II Augustus, commissioned by his father-in-law Emperor Ferdinand I.

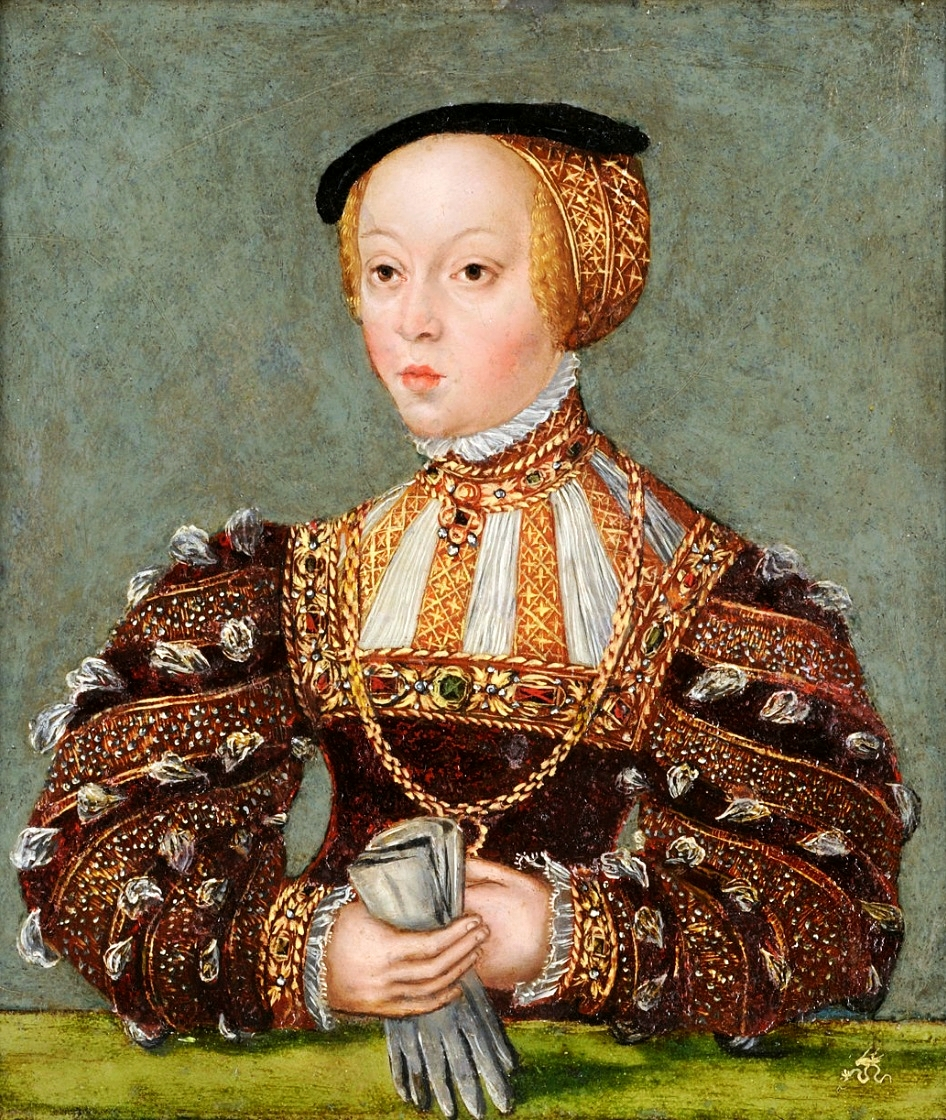
Posthumous painting of Queen Elizabeth of Austria, by Lucas Cranach the Younger.

When Sigismund II Augustus was co-crowned, Chancellor Krzysztof Szydłowiecki organised a preliminary marriage treaty between the young king and Elizabeth of Austria, daughter of King Ferdinand of Bohemia and Hungary. The marriage was signed on 10–11 November 1530 in Poznań; however, the arrangement was delayed by Queen Bona Sforza, who detested the new bride. The treaty was renewed on 16 June 1538 in Wrocław by Johannes Dantiscus, and the betrothal ceremony took place on 17 July 1538 in Innsbruck. Bona continued to lobby against the marriage and instead proposed Margaret of France to potentially form an alliance with the French against the Habsburgs.

On 5 May 1543, Elizabeth's escorted convoy entered Kraków and was greeted with enthusiasm by both the nobles and the townsfolk. The same day, 16-year-old Elizabeth married 22-year-old Sigismund II Augustus, whom she met for the first time shortly before marriage vows. The ceremony was performed at the Wawel Cathedral and the wedding continued for two weeks. Bona began to plot against the new queen. As a result, the newly wedded couple decided to reside in Vilnius, far from the royal court.

Despite the initial euphoria demonstrated by royal subjects, the marriage was unsuccessful from the very beginning. Sigismund Augustus did not find Elizabeth attractive and continued to have extramarital affairs with several mistresses, the most famous being Barbara Radziwiłł, the daughter of Hetman Jerzy Radziwiłł. Elizabeth was also known to be timid, meek and apprehensive due to a strict upbringing. The young and garrulous king was also repulsed by Elizabeth's newly diagnosed epilepsy and subsequent seizures. Only Sigismund the Old and some nobles showed compassion towards the new Queen, who was disregarded by her husband and scorned by Bona. Sigismund Augustus was indifferent to her health condition; when the seizures continued to intensify, he abandoned Elizabeth and returned to Kraków to collect her dowry. He also sent for Ferdinand's doctors to travel the long distance from Vienna, knowing that Elizabeth was ailing and deteriorating fast. She eventually died unattended and exhausted from the epileptic attacks on 15 June 1545 at the age of 18.

While still married to Elizabeth, Sigismund Augustus ordered the construction of a secret passage connecting the Royal Castle in Vilnius with the nearby Radziwiłł Palace so that he and Barbara could meet frequently and discreetly.

=== Second marriage ===
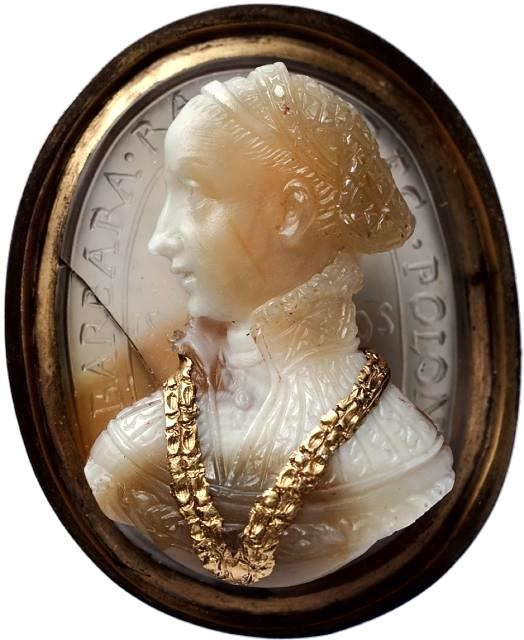
Cameo showing Queen Barbara from profile, made in 1550 by Jacopo Caraglio

In July or August 1547, two years after Elizabeth's death, Sigismund Augustus and Barbara Radziwiłł married in secret, without the knowledge of Sigismund the Old and Bona. It has been suspected by many historians that the cause of the wedding was presumption of the bride's pregnancy. Barbara was indeed reported to miscarry in November of the same year, in the letter sent to Sigismund Augustus; however the wording used in the text suggests that her pregnancy would be early, probably conceived in September or October, already few months after the wedding, meaning it wasn't the reason for the ceremony. In the writing to his cousin, Albert of Prussia, Sigismund Augustus himself as the reason for marriage to Barbara cited love.

The wedding was announced by the young King to his parents and Polish nobility in February 1548 in Piotrków Trybunalski. Sigismund the Old, after initial acceptance, eventually decided to oppose his son's marriage. He was supported in his actions by Bona. Sigismund Augustus refused to renounce his wife, however, he did not proclaim her the Queen of Poland and Grand Duchess of Lithuania until his father's death. The older King died on 1 April 1548, leaving his son as sole ruler and thereby making him free to declare Barbara the Queen and Grand Duchess on the 17 of the same month.

== Sole reign ==
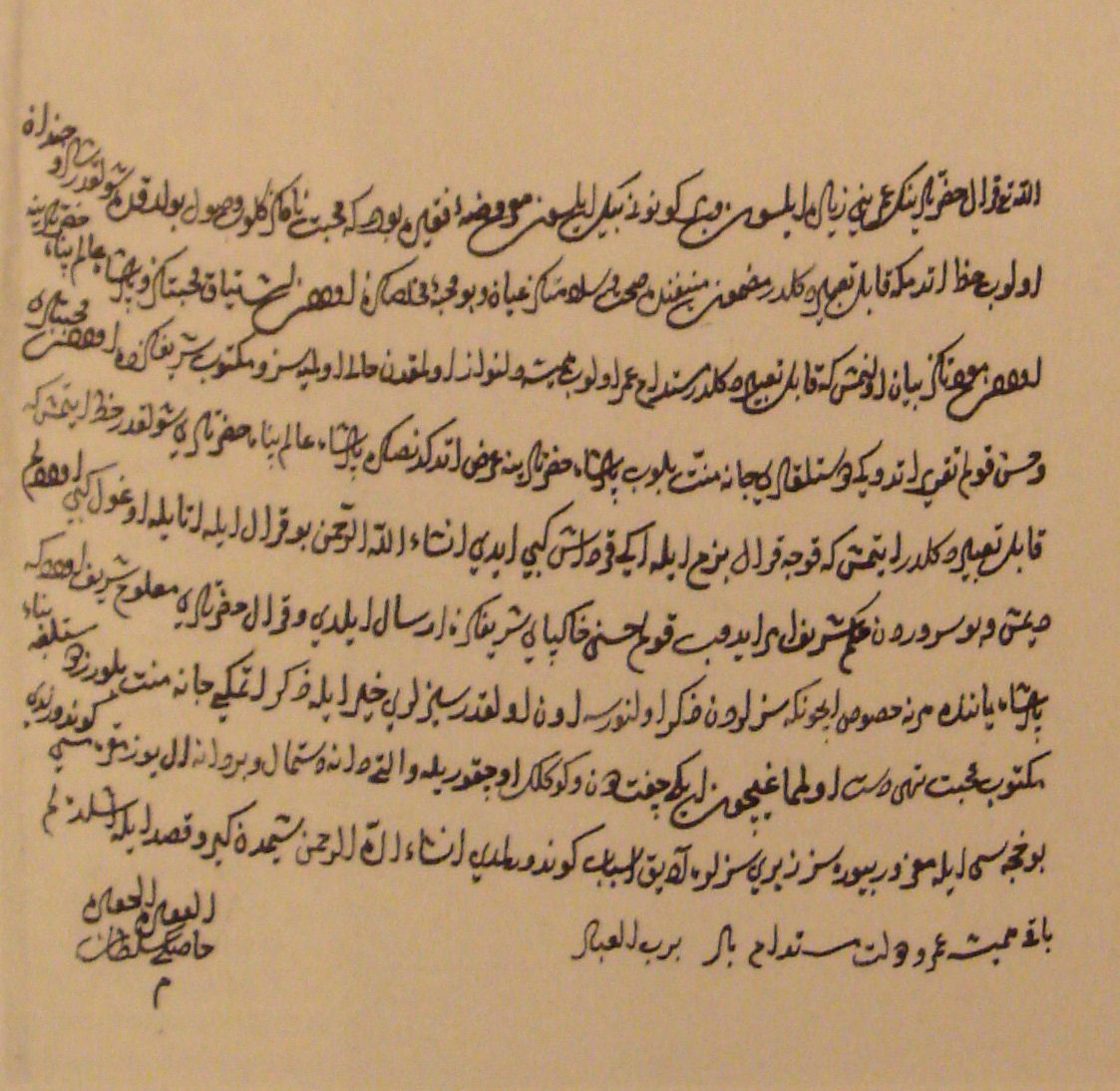
Letter from Hürrem Sultan, wife of Suleiman the Magnificent, to Sigismund Augustus, complimenting him on his accession to the throne, 1549

Sigismund II's reign was marked by a period of temporary stability and external expansion. He witnessed the bloodless introduction of the Protestant Reformation into Poland and Lithuania, and the peero-cratic upheaval that placed most political power in the hands of the Polish nobility; he saw the collapse of the Knights of the Sword in the north, which led to the Commonwealth's acquisition of Livonia as a Lutheran duchy and the consolidation of Ottoman power in the southeast. A less imposing figure than his father, the elegant and refined Sigismund II Augustus was nevertheless an even more effective statesman than the stern and majestic Sigismund I the Old.

Sigismund II possessed to a high degree the tenacity and patience that seem to have characterised all the Jagiellons, and he added to these qualities a dexterity and diplomatic finesse. No other Polish king seems to have so thoroughly understood the nature of the Polish Sejm and national assembly. Both the Austrian ambassadors and the papal legates testify to the care with which he controlled his nation. According to diplomats, everything went as Sigismund II wished, and he seemed to know everything in advance. He managed to obtain more funds from the Sejm than his father ever could, and at one of the parliament's sittings, he won the hearts of the assembled envoys by unexpectedly appearing in the simple grey coat of a Mazovian lord. Like his father, a pro-Austrian by conviction, he contrived even in this respect to carry with him the nation, often distrustful of the Germans. He also avoided serious complications and skirmishes with the powerful Turks.

Sigismund II Augustus vested several localities with town rights, including Chmielnik, Daleszyce, Dzisna, Filipów, Merkinė, Osieck, Siemiatycze, Wasilków, Wisztyniec, Augustów, founded by Sigismund himself, and Knyszyn, home to one of his favourite residences.

=== Recognition of marriage with Barbara ===
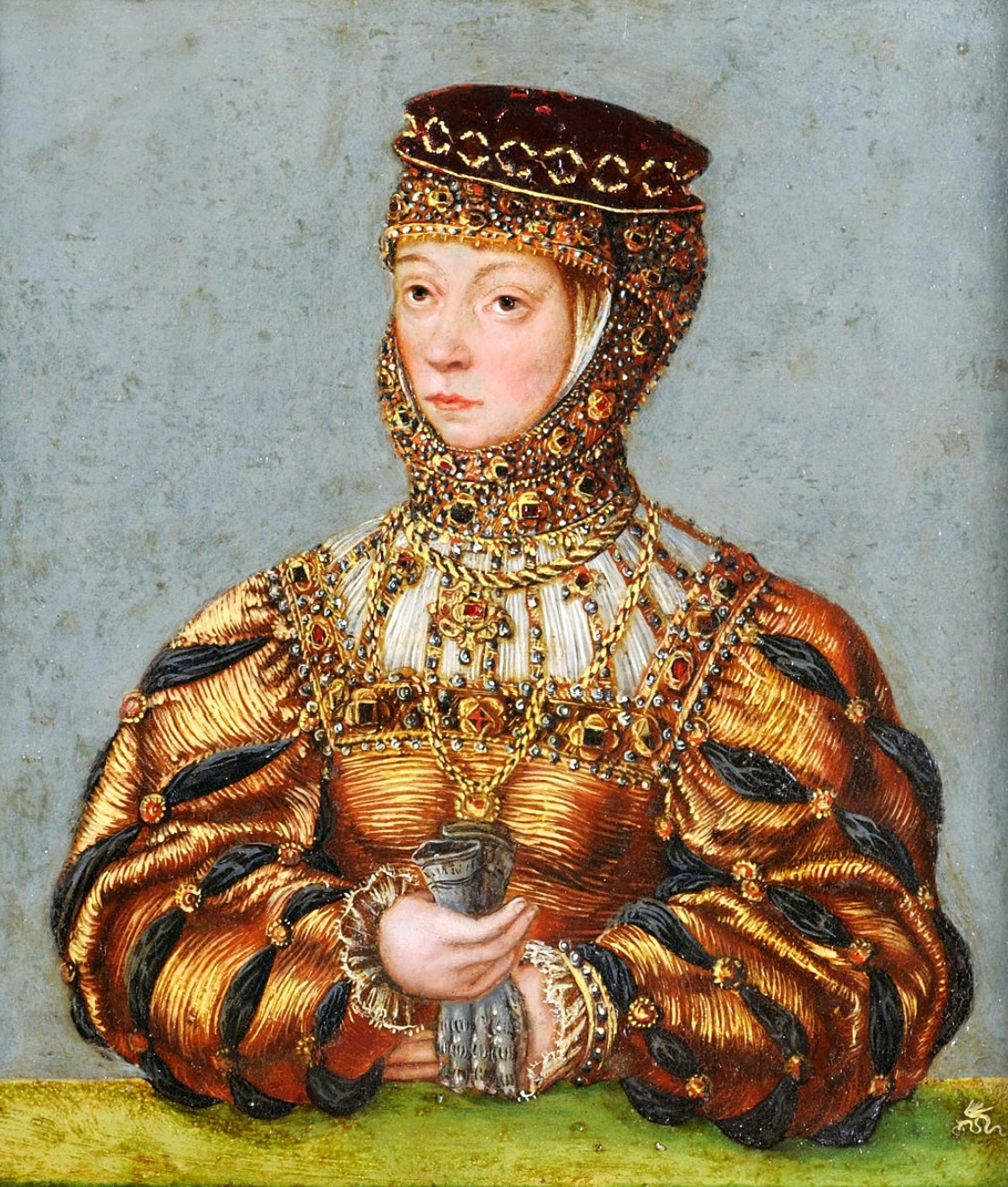
Posthumous portrait of Barbara Radziwiłł by Lucas Cranach the Younger, ca. 1553

==== Struggle with opposition ====
From the outset of his reign, Sigismund Augustus came into collision with the country's privileged Polish nobility, after many of them refused to recognize his marriage to Barbara and accept her as their Queen.

Barbara was despised by Queen Bona, who attempted to annul the marriage at any cost, and who departed from Wawel and went to Mazovia where she established her own small courtly entourage.. The agitation was also abundant at Sigismund's first Sejm (parliament) sitting on 31 October 1548, where the deputies threatened to renounce their allegiance unless the King repudiated Barbara. The nobles portrayed Barbara as an opportunistic prostitute who charmed the king for her own benefit. The young monarch even considered abdicating. To avoid an armed rebellion, Sigismund also formed an alliance with his former father-in-law, Ferdinand I Habsburg in 1549.

Unlike her predecessor, Barbara was disliked by the royal court and led a more secluded life with Sigismund Augustus, who was deeply in love with her. On the other hand, she was ambitious, intelligent, perceptive and had an exemplary taste in fashion. She always wore precious pearl necklaces when sitting for portraits. The mutual admiration between Sigismund and Barbara made the relationship "one of the greatest love affairs in Polish history".

Sigismund Augustus provided luxurious lifestyle and expensive gifts for his wife at Wawel Castle since her arrival in Kraków on 13 February 1549. The royal pair often visited royal hunting residency in Niepołomice. The King also granted Barbara several provinces to administer and provide income. Although ambitious and bright, she showed a lack of interest in political life, but had some influence over decisions made by Sigismund.

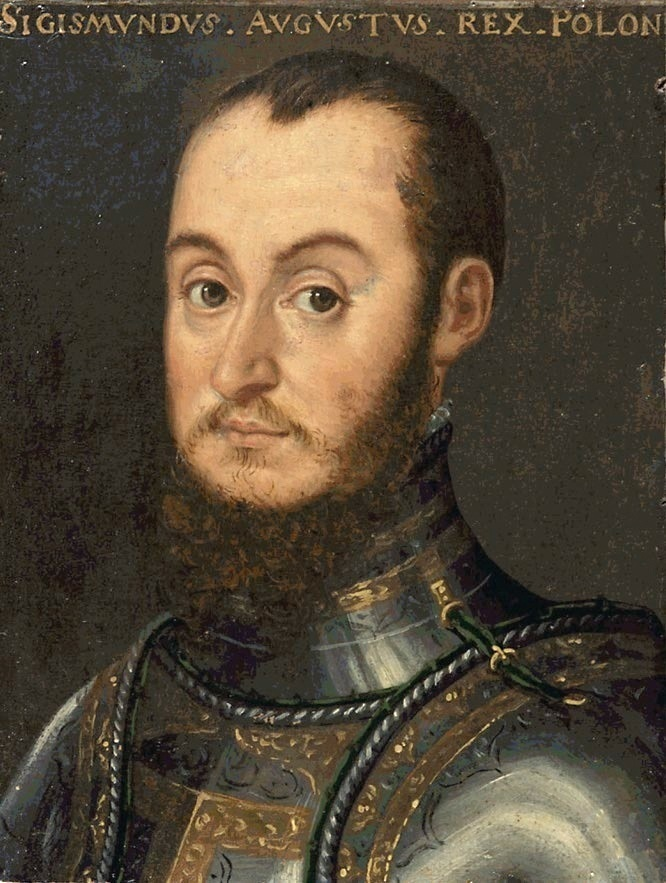
Portrait of Sigismund II Augustus in armour, 1550s

Barbara was officially recognized by Polish nobility as legitimate royal wife in 1550, when Sigismund summoned his second Sejm. The matter of her coronation was not discussed but, with the opposition defeated, she was ultimately crowned as Queen of Poland on 7 December 1550 by Primate Mikołaj Dzierzgowski.

Queen Bona also decided to accept her son's marriage, sending a messenger in 1551 who informed Barbara of her decision.

==== Death of Barbara ====
During their marriage, Barbara suffered from poor health, particularly stomach and abdominal pain. After the coronation, her condition deteriorated rapidly. She was tormented by strong fever, diarrhea, nausea and lack of appetite. After careful observation by hired medics, a lump was discovered on her stomach filled with pus. Sigismund Augustus gravely despaired and sent for doctors and even folk healers from the entire country. He personally tended to his sick wife despite her foul smell and dedicated himself when necessary; the king hoped to take Barbara to the hunting castle at Niepołomice and ordered to demolish the small city gate so her carriage could pass freely. However, Barbara died on 8 May 1551 in Kraków after continuous pain and agony.

It was her dying wish that she'd be buried in Lithuania, her homeland. The body was transported to Vilnius Cathedral, where she was finally buried on 23 June next to Elizabeth of Austria. Her death was a major blow to Sigismund; he often attended her coffin on foot while being transported to Vilnius in hot weather. Sigismund also became more serious and reserved; he avoided balls, temporarily renounced his mistresses and dressed in black until his death.

The cause of Barbara's death is debatable. Her opponents and family members suggested sexually transmitted diseases due to a number of supposed affairs she had before marrying Sigismund. There were also persistent rumours that she was poisoned by Queen Bona Sforza. However, modern historians and experts point to cervical cancer or uterine inflammation.

=== Third marriage ===
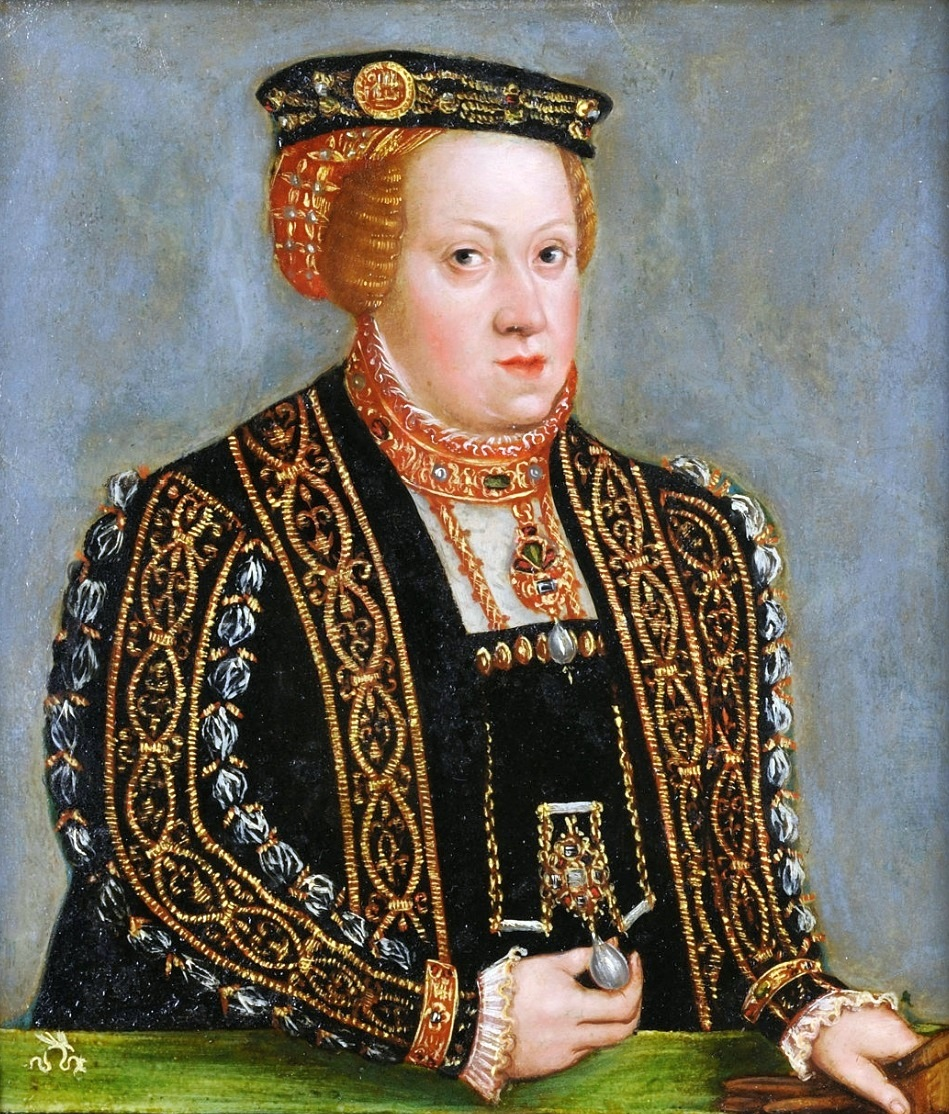
Portrait of Catherine of Austria by Lucas Cranach the Younger.

The death of Queen Barbara Radziwiłł, five months after her coronation and under distressing circumstances, compelled Sigismund to contract a third, purely political union with his first cousin-once-removed, the Austrian archduchess Catherine, to avoid an Austro-Russian alliance. She was also the sister of his first wife, Elizabeth. Catherine, unlike previous queens, was considered dull and obese. Sigismund II Augustus found her immensely unattractive despite accepting the marriage and organising a pompous wedding ceremony on 30 July 1553. The correspondence between the two remained purely formal and political for the remainder of their lives.

Since her coronation, Catherine acted as Austria's puppet at the Polish court; she was tasked with espionage and obtaining important information for the benefit of the Habsburgs. Sigismund Augustus was aware of the scheme, but by marrying Catherine, he obtained a promise from Austria to stay neutral and abandon plans with Russia. This neutrality was undermined by Catherine's actions, who followed her father's policy and objected to the return of John Sigismund Zápolya and Isabella Jagiellon (Sigismund's sister) to Hungary. She would conspire with the Habsburg envoys prior to an audience with the king. She would also dictate what and how the envoys should express their views. When Sigismund Augustus found out about Catherine's intrigues, he sent her to Radom and excluded her from political life.

=== Livonia ===
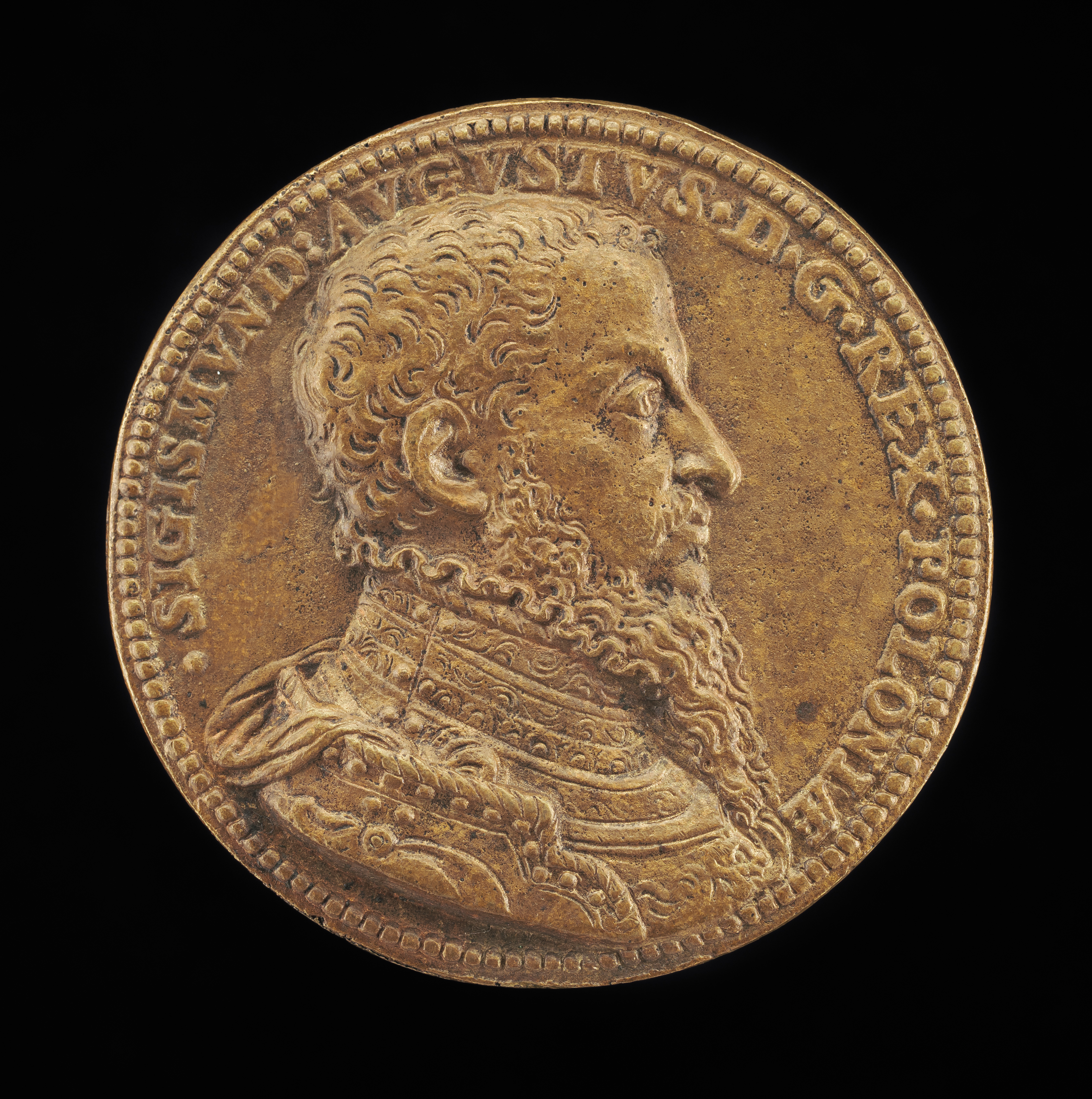
Medal obverse featuring Sigismund from 1562, National Gallery of Art in Washington, D.C.

During Sigismund Augustus' reign, Livonia was in political turmoil. His father, Sigismund I, permitted Albert of Prussia to introduce the Protestant Reformation and secularise the southern part of the Teutonic Order State. Albert then established Europe's first Protestant state in the Duchy of Prussia in 1525, but under Polish suzerainty. However, his efforts to introduce Protestantism to the Livonian Brothers of the Sword in the northernmost part of the region were met with fierce resistance and divided the Livonian Confederation. When Albert's brother Wilhelm and Archbishop of Riga attempted to implement a Lutheran church order in his diocese, the Catholic estates rebelled and arrested both Wilhelm and his bishop coadjutor, Christopher, Duke of Mecklenburg.

As Prussia was a tributary state of the Polish Crown, Sigismund Augustus, a Catholic, was forced to intervene in favour of Protestant Albert and his brother Wilhelm. In July 1557, the Polish forces left for Livonia. The armed intervention proved to be successful; the Catholic Livonians surrendered and signed the Treaty of Pozvol on 14 September 1557. The agreement placed most Livonian territories under Polish protection and de facto became part of Poland. Gotthard Kettler, the last Master of the Order, was granted the newly established Duchy of Courland and Semigallia. Wilhelm was restored to his former position as archbishop on Sigismund's demand, with the Lutheran church order being enacted.

The incorporation of Courland into the Polish sphere of influence created an alliance which threatened Russia's plans of expanding into the Baltic coast. Sigismund directed the alliance against Ivan the Terrible to protect lucrative trade routes in Livonia, thus creating a new valid casus belli against the Russian Tsardom. On 22 January 1558, Ivan invaded the Baltic states and started the Livonian War, which lasted 25 years until 1583. Russia's eventual defeat in the war legally partitioned Livonia between Poland (Latvia, southern Estonia) and Sweden (central-northern Estonia). The Polish sector became subsequently known as Polish Livonia or Inflanty; it was settled with colonists from Poland proper, resulting in systematic polonisation of these lands.

=== Northern Seven Years' War ===
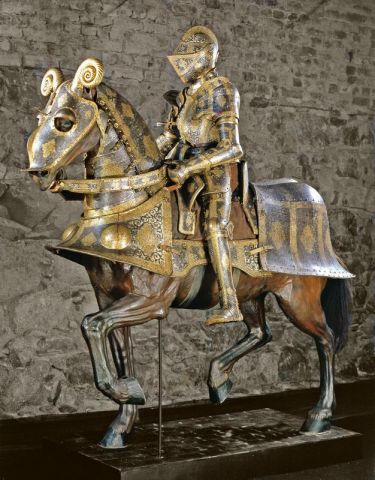
Parade armour of King Sigismund Augustus, made in Nuremberg by Kunz Lochner, 1550s. Livrustkammaren in Stockholm.

When the Kalmar Union between Sweden and Denmark was disbanded in 1523 due to Swedish resentment of Danish tyranny, Baltic trade became threatened. The port city of Gdańsk (Danzig), Poland's wealthiest city, faced difficulties due to ongoing conflict on the sea and piracy. The capital, Kraków, was also affected as the trade route from the Baltic ran through Gdańsk and along the Vistula river to the southern province of Lesser Poland. Gdańsk, which was privileged with its own army and government, resisted Sigismund's order to send privateers and created the first Polish Admiralty in its city. Most of the deputies in the city council were merchants and tradesmen of German descent or Protestants who were either politically leaning towards Sweden or fighting for the status of an independent "city state". 11 Polish privateers sent by Sigismund were eventually executed, which greatly angered the king. Poland then joined Denmark against Sweden for Baltic domination.

The war ended as status quo ante bellum in 1570 with the Treaty of Stettin, which was signed by Bishop Martin Kromer on behalf of Sigismund Augustus. However, the ineffective conflict did have its input in establishing Poland's first registered naval fleet (Naval Commission) in 1568.

=== Union of Lublin ===
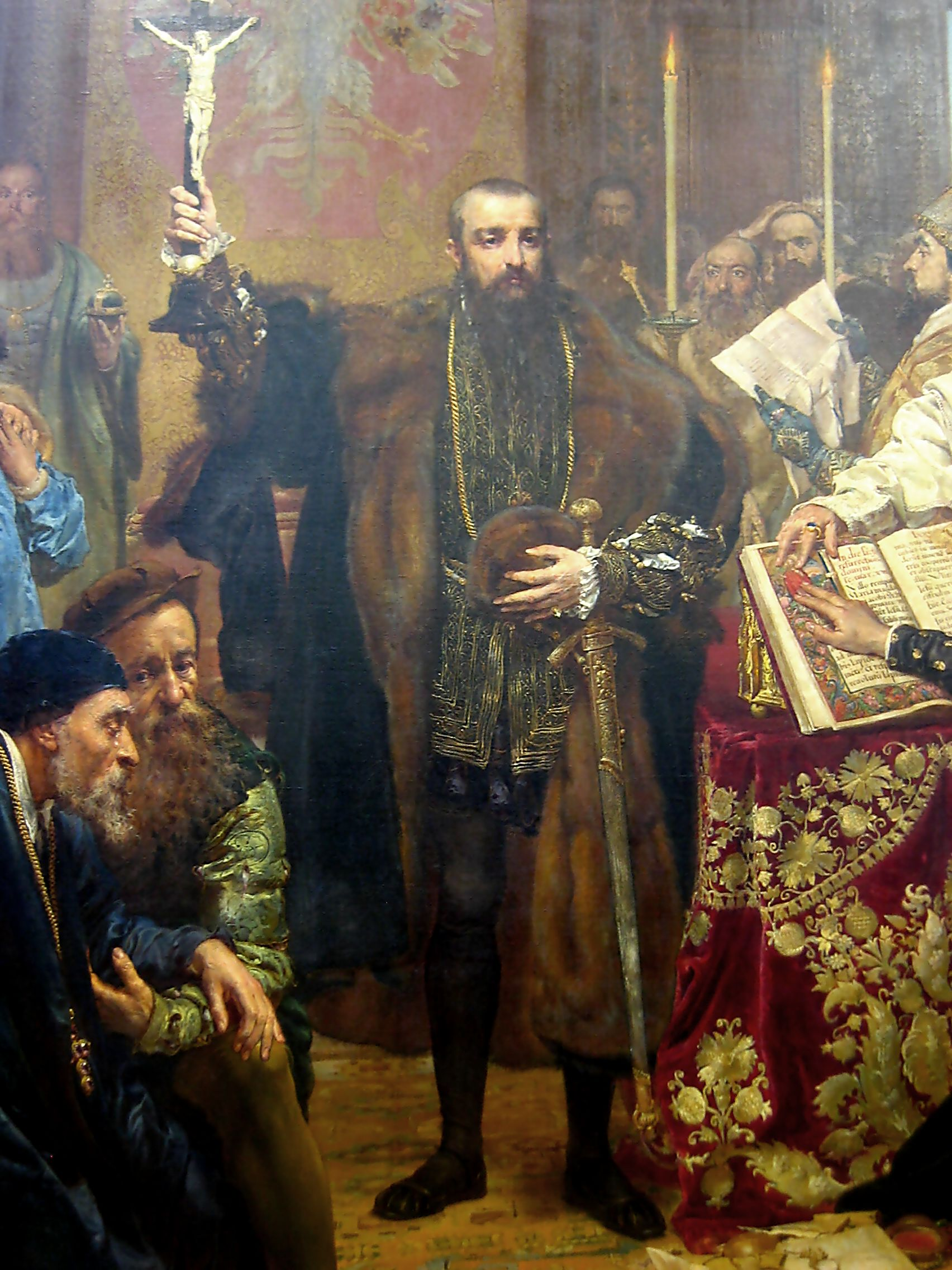
Union of Lublin; Sigismund stands in the center holding a crucifix among nobles, envoys and the clergy.

Sigismund's most striking legacy may have been the Union of Lublin, which united Poland and Lithuania into one state, the Polish–Lithuanian Commonwealth, jointly with German-speaking Royal Prussia and Prussian cities. This achievement might well have been impossible without the monarch's personal approach to politics and ability to mediate.

At first, the treaty was perceived as a threat to Lithuanian sovereignty. Lithuanian magnates were afraid of losing their powers, since the proposed union would lower their rank and status to an equivalent with petty nobility rather than the wealthier Polish aristocracy. On the other hand, the unification would provide a strong alliance against Russian (Muscovite) attack from the east. Lithuania was ravaged by the Muscovite-Lithuanian Wars, which endured for over 150 years. During the Second War, Lithuania lost 210,000 square miles (540,000 km^{2}) of its territory to Russia, and the final defeat in the Livonian War would result in the country's incorporation into the Russian Tsardom. Furthermore, the Poles were reluctant to aid Lithuania without a quid pro quo. The most vocal opponent of the union was Sigismund's brother-in-law, Mikołaj "the Red" Radziwiłł (Lithuanian: Radvila Rudasis), who viewed the agreement as "peaceful annexation of Lithuania" by Poland. He also resisted polonisation policies which forced ethnic Lithuanians to change their names and native language to Polish or Latin.

As another war with Russia loomed, Sigismund Augustus pressed the members of parliament (Sejm) for the union, gradually gaining more followers due to his persuasive abilities and auspicious diplomacy. The potential union agreement would lead to the eviction of Lithuanian landowners who opposed the transition of territory from multi-ethnic Lithuania to Poland. Such terms were causing outrage among the most renowned members of the Lithuanian upper classes, but Sigismund was decisive and ruthless in this matter. Moreover, the personal union between the two countries created by the marriage of Jadwiga with Jogaila in 1385 was not entirely constitutional. Being the last male member of the Jagiellons, childless Sigismund sought to preserve his dynasty's legacy. The newly proposed constitutional union would create one large Commonwealth state, with one elected monarch who would simultaneously reign over both domains.

The initial Sejm negotiations on unity in January 1569, near the Polish city of Lublin, were futile. The right of Poles to settle and own land in the Grand Duchy was questioned by Lithuanian envoys. Following Mikołaj Radziwiłł's departure from Lublin on 1 March 1569, Sigismund announced the incorporation of then-Lithuanian Podlachia, Volhynia, Podolia and Kiev provinces into Poland, with strong approval from the local Ruthenian (Ukrainian) gentry. Those historic regions, which once belonged to the Kievan Rus', were disputed between Lithuania and Russia. However, the Ruthenian nobles were eager to capitalise on the political or economic potential offered by the Polish sphere and agreed to the terms. Previously, the Kingdom of Ruthenia or "Ukraine" was abolished in 1349, after Poland and Lithuania split modern-day Ukraine in the aftermath of the Galicia–Volhynia Wars. Now, under the Union of Lublin, all Ukrainian and Ruthenian territories which were alien in culture, customs, religion and language to the Polish people would be annexed by Catholic Poland. Strong westernisation and polonisation would follow, including the clandestine suppression of the Ukrainian Eastern Orthodox Church by future King Sigismund III Vasa. Ruthenia remained under Polish rule until the Cossack uprisings against Polish domination and the Partitions of Poland, when Ukraine was annexed by the Russian Empire.

The Lithuanians were compelled to return to the Sejm negotiations under Jan Hieronim Chodkiewicz and continue negotiations. The Polish nobility once again pressed for the full incorporation of the Grand Duchy of Lithuania into Poland; however, the Lithuanians disapproved. The parties eventually agreed on a federal state on 28 June 1569, and on 1 July 1569, the Union of Lublin was signed at Lublin Castle, thus establishing the Polish–Lithuanian Commonwealth. Sigismund Augustus ratified the unification act on 4 July, and henceforth governed one of the largest and most multicultural countries of 16th century Europe.

=== Health and final years ===
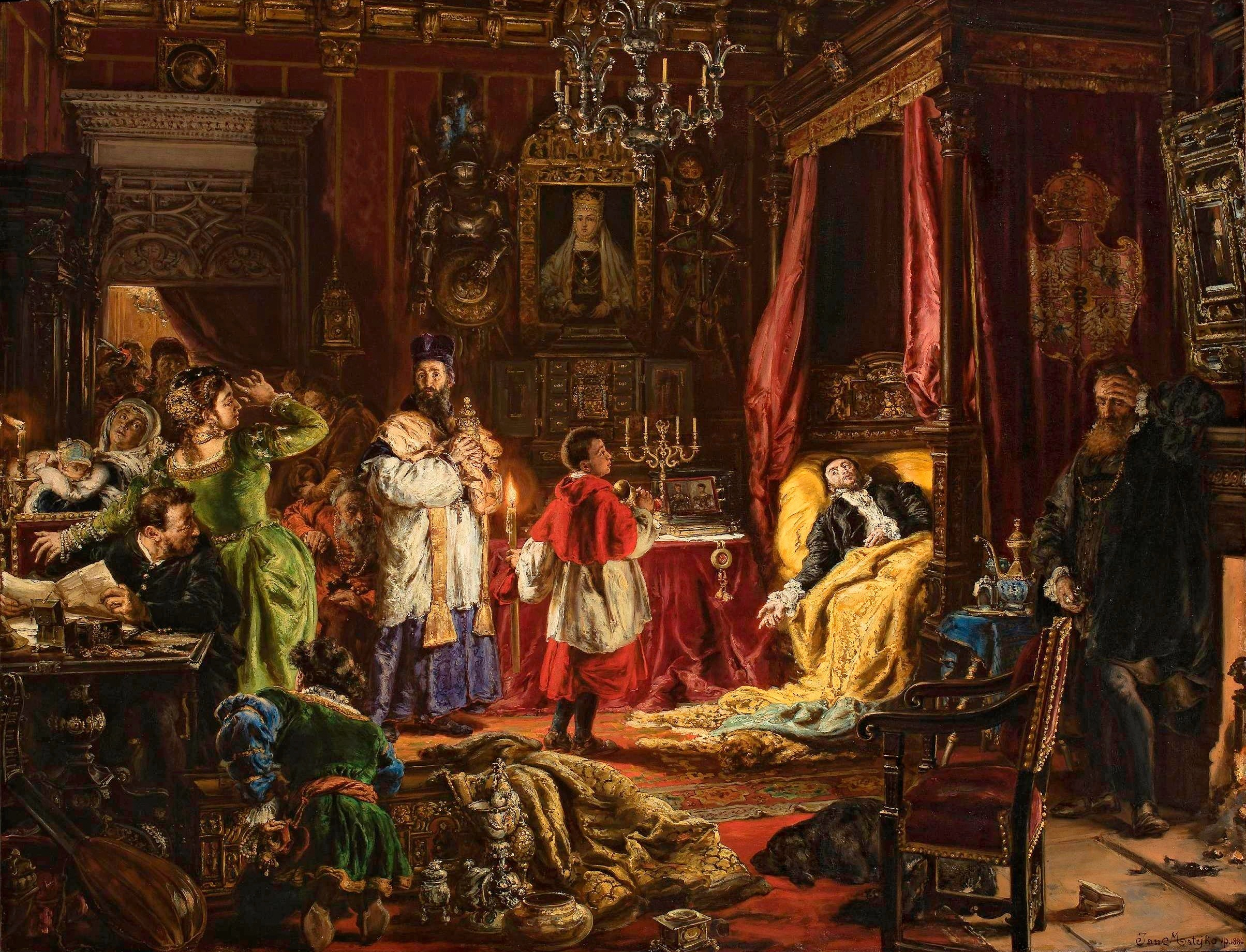
Death of Sigismund II Augustus at Knyszyn, by Jan Matejko

Unlike his father, Sigismund Augustus was frail and sickly. Shortly before turning 50, his health rapidly declined. Being involved in many affairs and holding a large number of mistresses, historians agree that the king had venereal disease which caused him to have fertility issues. By 1558 Sigismund had gout and since 1568 he also suffered from kidney stones, which triggered immense pain. He employed numerous medics, healers or even quack doctors and imported expensive ointments from Italy. By the end of his life, the king was losing teeth and vigour, possibly due to tuberculosis. Antonio Maria Graziani recalls that Sigismund was unable to keep standing without a cane when greeting Cardinal Giovanni Francesco Commendone.

The King remained separated from his thirds wife Catherine since 1562. His marriage was a matter of great political import to Protestants and Catholics alike. The Polish Protestants hoped that he would divorce and remarry and thus bring about a breach with Rome at the very crisis of the religious struggle in Poland. Sigismund was not free to remarry until Catherine's death on 28 February 1572, but he followed her to the grave less than six months later. As the King lost all hope of children by his third wife, he was the last male Jagiellon in the direct line so the dynasty was threatened with extinction. He sought to remedy this by adultery with two of the most beautiful of his countrywomen, Barbara Giza (said to physically resemble late queen Barbara Radziwiłł) and Anna Zajączkowska. On 12 September 1571 Barbara ultimately gave birth to a daughter, also named Barbara, whom Sigismund acknowledged as his child.

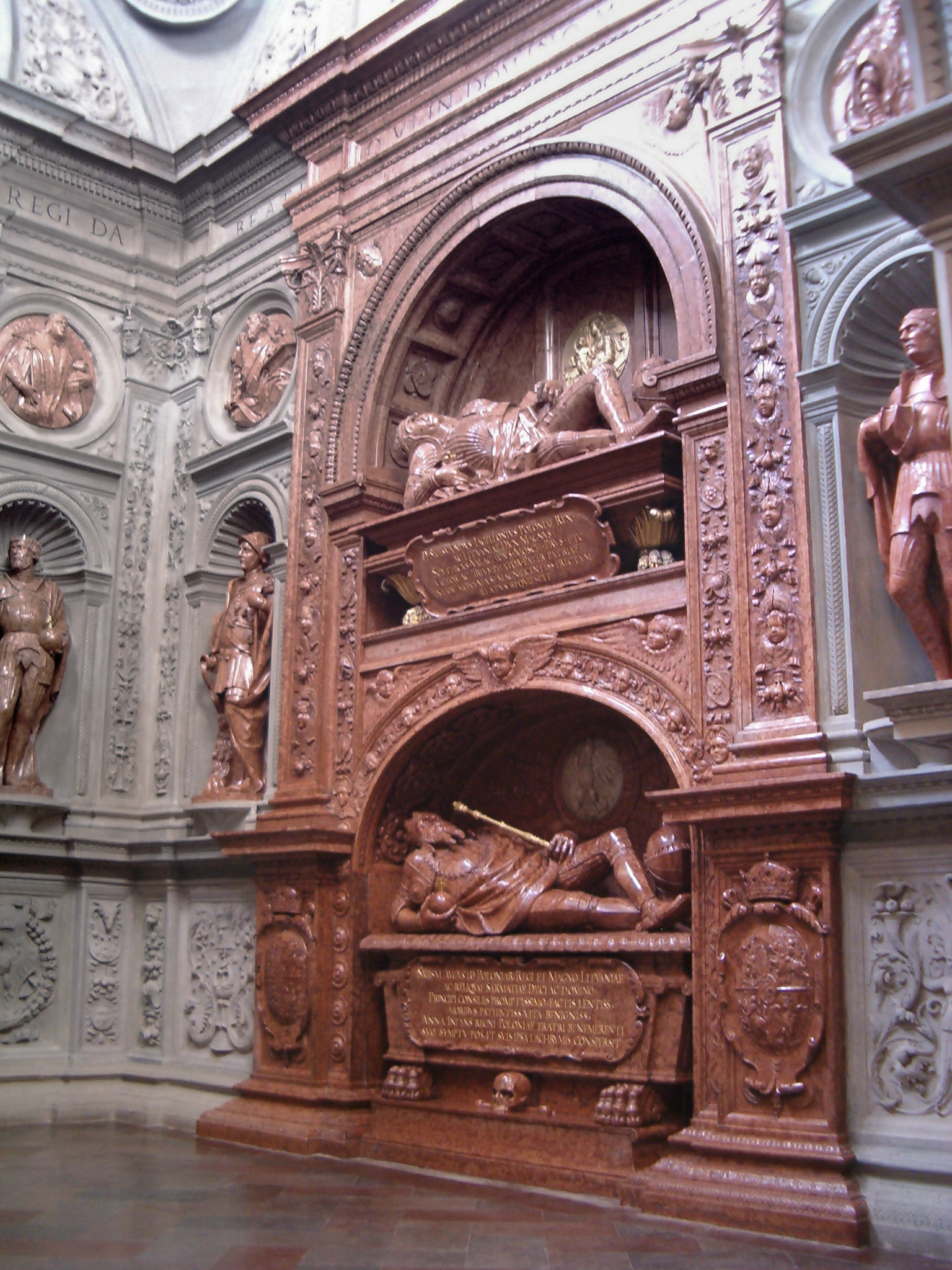
Cenotaph of Sigismund II Augustus (above) in the Sigismund Chapel at Wawel Cathedral in Kraków, Poland. Below the cenotaph of his father, Sigismund I the Old.

During spring 1572, Sigismund Augustus became feverish. Untreated tuberculosis made him feeble and impotent, but he was able to travel to his private retreat in Knyszyn. While at Knyszyn, he corresponded with his diplomats and nobles, highlighting that he was feeling well and hoped to recover. Great Marshal Jan Firlej denied these claims and reported that the king was bleeding severely due to consumption and was troubled by pain in the chest and lumbar.

Sigismund died in Knyszyn on 7 July 1572 at 6:00 pm, surrounded by a group of senators and envoys. The official cause of death given by the medics was consumption. His body was placed on a catafalque and remained at the nearby Tykocin Castle until 10 September 1573, when it was transported back to Kraków through Warsaw.

After interring the remains of Barbara Radziwiłł in Vilnius Cathedral in 1551, Sigismund intended to re-bury her in the Church of St. Anne, and it seems from details of his will that he would have preferred to be buried alongside her. He wrote in his will that he wished to be interred together with Barbara in the Church of St. Anne if he died in Lithuania, or in Kraków if he died in Poland. Knyszyn, where Sigimund died, was originally Lithuanian territory; however, it was annexed by the Crown of Poland in 1569. Consequently, he was laid to rest at the Wawel Cathedral on 10 February 1574. Sigismund's wish to have Barbara and Queen Elizabeth reburied in St. Anne's Church was also ignored, and they have remained resting in Vilnius Cathedral.

Sigismund II Augustus was the last male member of the Jagiellonian dynasty. The death of his childless sister, Anna, in 1596 marked the end of the dynasty. His illegitimate daughter by Giza was adopted by her mother's new husband (Michał Woroniecki) and given her stepfather's surname.

In addition to his family connections, Sigismund II Augustus was allied to the Habsburgs as member of the Order of the Golden Fleece.

== Religion ==
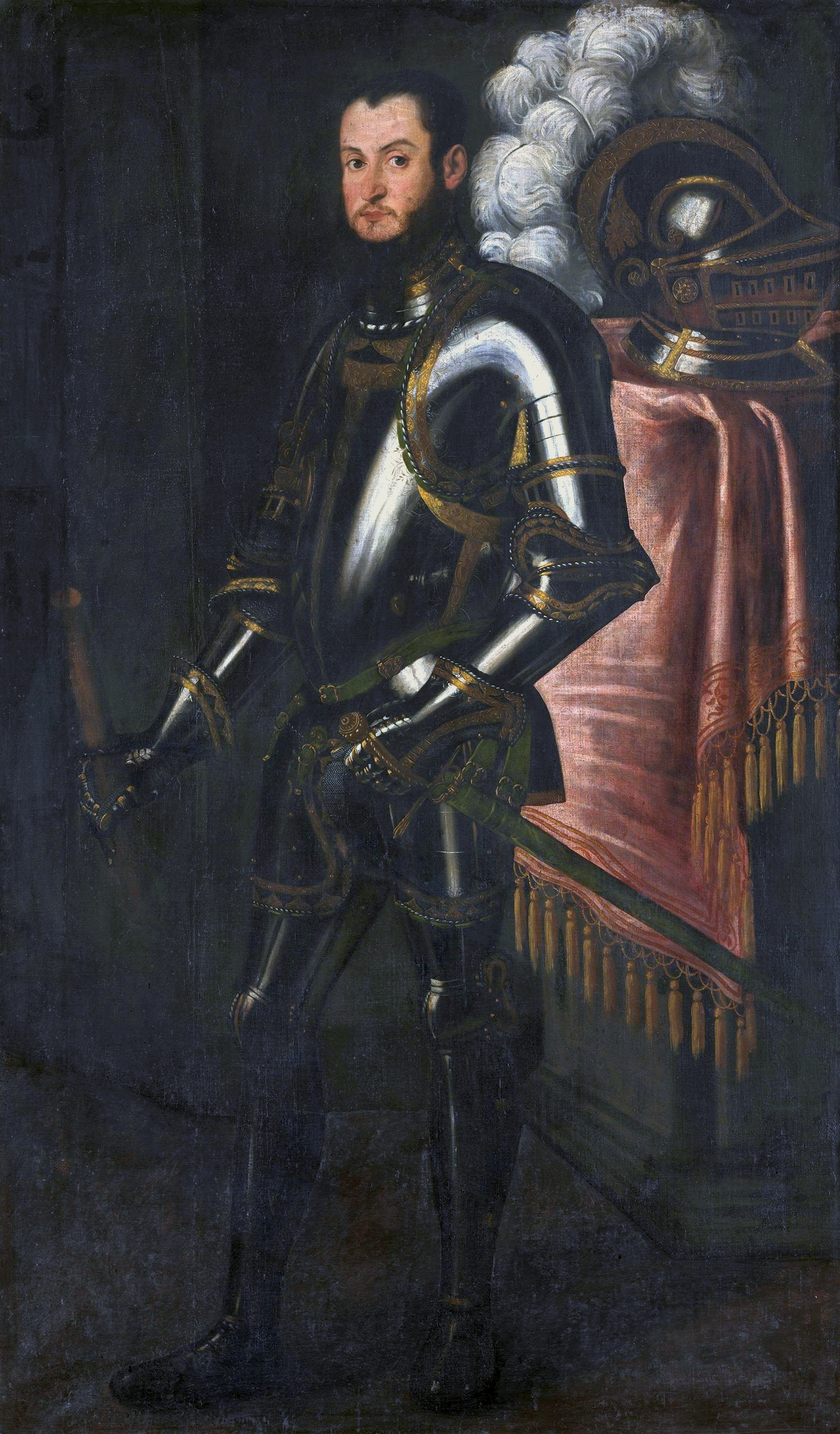
Sigismund Augustus in armour, 1550s, Alte Pinakothek

In comparison to his staunchly Catholic father, Sigismund Augustus paid little attention to matters of faith and religion. Having a large number of mistresses before, during and after being married, he was viewed by the clergy as an adulterer and libertine. Sigismund was also reasonably tolerant towards minorities and supported nobles of different faith and nationality to be part of the national assembly, the Sejm. He continued his father's policies, but was more accepting of the Protestant Reformation in Poland (only to the status of a minority religion). Several magnates converted to Calvinism or Lutheranism during the Reformation started by Martin Luther and John Calvin, most notably Stanisław Zamoyski, Jan Zamoyski, Mikołaj Rej, Andrzej Frycz Modrzewski, Johannes a Lasco (Jan Łaski) and Mikołaj "the Black" Radziwiłł.

Throughout the 16th century, Andrzej Frycz Modrzewski advocated for renouncing Rome's authority and establishing a separate and independent Polish Church. His initiative was chiefly inspired by the creation of the Anglican Church by Henry VIII in 1534. Sigismund II Augustus was lenient towards the idea, particularly due to the sudden spread of Protestantism among courtiers, advisors, nobles and peasants. Calvinism became especially popular among the upper classes as it promoted democratic freedoms and called for rebellion against absolutism, which the privileged Polish nobility favoured. During the 1555 Sejm session in Piotrków, the nobles intensively discussed the rights of priests in the newly proposed Polish Church and demanded the abolition of celibacy. Some Catholic bishops were supportive of the concepts and acknowledged the need for uniting Poland, Lithuania, Prussia and their vassals under a common religion. Sigismund agreed to the postulates, however, under the condition that Pope Paul IV agreed. Instead, Paul IV was enraged that such a proposition emerged for him to accept; he declined and refused to grant consent. Facing potential excommunication, the assembly were forced to abandon their plans. Nevertheless, Protestantism continued to flourish and spread. In 1565, the Polish Brethren came into existence as a Nontrinitarian sect of Calvinism.

One year after Sigismund's death, the Warsaw Confederation was adopted as the first European act granting religious freedoms. Despite this, Protestantism in Poland ultimately declined during the fierce Counter-Reformation measures under the despotic and arch-Catholic Sigismund III Vasa, who ruled for nearly 45 years. For instance, the Polish Brethren were banned, hunted down, and their leaders executed.

== Patronage ==
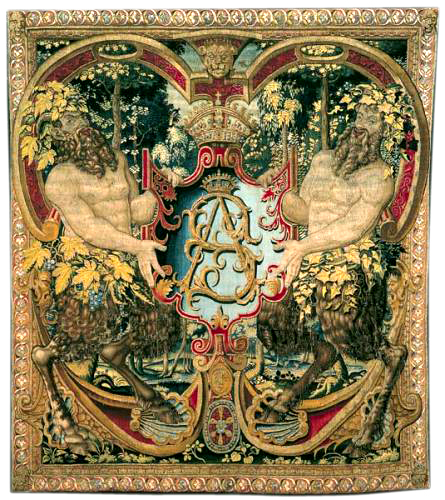
Tapestry with Shield-Bearing Satyrs with the royal monogram S.A. (Sigismundus Augustus), woven in Brussels in about 1555

Sigismund Augustus carried on with the development of several royal residencies, including Wawel, Vilnius Castle, Niepołomice and the Royal Castle in Warsaw. In the 1560s he acquired the Tykocin Castle and rebuilt it in Renaissance style. During the reign of Sigismund Augustus the structure served as a royal residence with an impressive treasury and library as well as the main arsenal of the crown.

Sigismund II Augustus was a passionate collector of jewels and gemstones. According to nuncio Bernardo Bongiovanni's relation, his collection was cached in 16 chests. Among the precious items in his possession was Charles V's ruby of 80,000 scudos' worth, as well as the Emperor's diamond medal with Habsburgs Eagle on one side and two columns with a sign Plus Ultra on the other side. In 1571, after the death of his nephew John Sigismund Zápolya, he inherited the Hungarian Crown used by some Hungarian monarchs. A Swedish Crown was also made for him. The Polish king treated those crowns as family keepsakes, and kept them in a private vault in the Tykocin Castle. He had also a sultan's sword of 16,000 ducats' worth, 30 precious horse trappings and 20 different private-use armours. The king's possession included a rich collection of tapestries (360 pieces), commissioned by him in Brussels in the years 1550–1560.

The king enjoyed reading, especially short stories, poems and satires. Under the influence of bishop Piotr Myszkowski, Poland's then greatest writer and poet Jan Kochanowski joined the royal court in 1563. It is uncertain whether Sigismund and Kochanowski were friends; however, Kochanowski's correspondence clearly highlights that the two had close contact and he assisted the monarch at most important occasions, including military manoeuvres in Lithuania in 1567. Kochanowski was also present during the signing of Lublin Union in 1569.

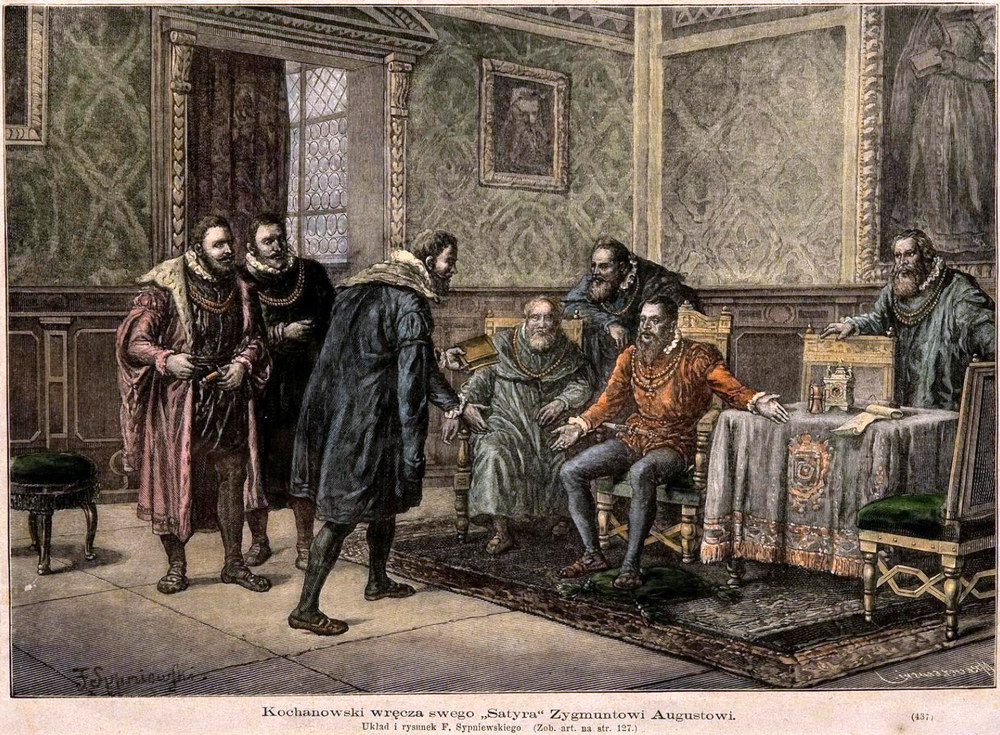
Jan Kochanowski presents his work Satyr to Sigismund, an 1884 illustration by Feliks Sypniewski

Sigismund was fond of foreign craft-makers and employed Italian goldsmiths, jewellers and medalists, very much like his father. One of the more renowned figures brought to Poland was Giovanni Jacopo Caraglio. In Italy, Caraglio was one of the first reproductive printmakers. In Poland, Sigismund tasked him with the production of cameos, medallions, coins and jewellery. Numerous medals and roundels from this period feature the last members of the Jagiellonian dynasty. When Sigismund's mother, Bona, died in 1557, Sigismund had to collect his inheritance from the Italian estates. On 18 October 1558, the king granted the right to arrange the first regular Polish postal service operating from Kraków to Venice, thus establishing Poczta Polska (Polish Post). All maintenance costs were borne by the Crown and the post was mostly managed by Italians or Germans. Additional couriers travelled between Kraków, Warsaw and Vilnius. Since 1562, the postal route also encompassed Vienna and cities in the Holy Roman Empire, which enabled continuous correspondence with the Habsburgs.

In 1573, the first permanent bridge over the Vistula river in Warsaw and also the longest wooden bridge in Europe at the time, was named in Sigismund's honour.

== Marriages and issue ==
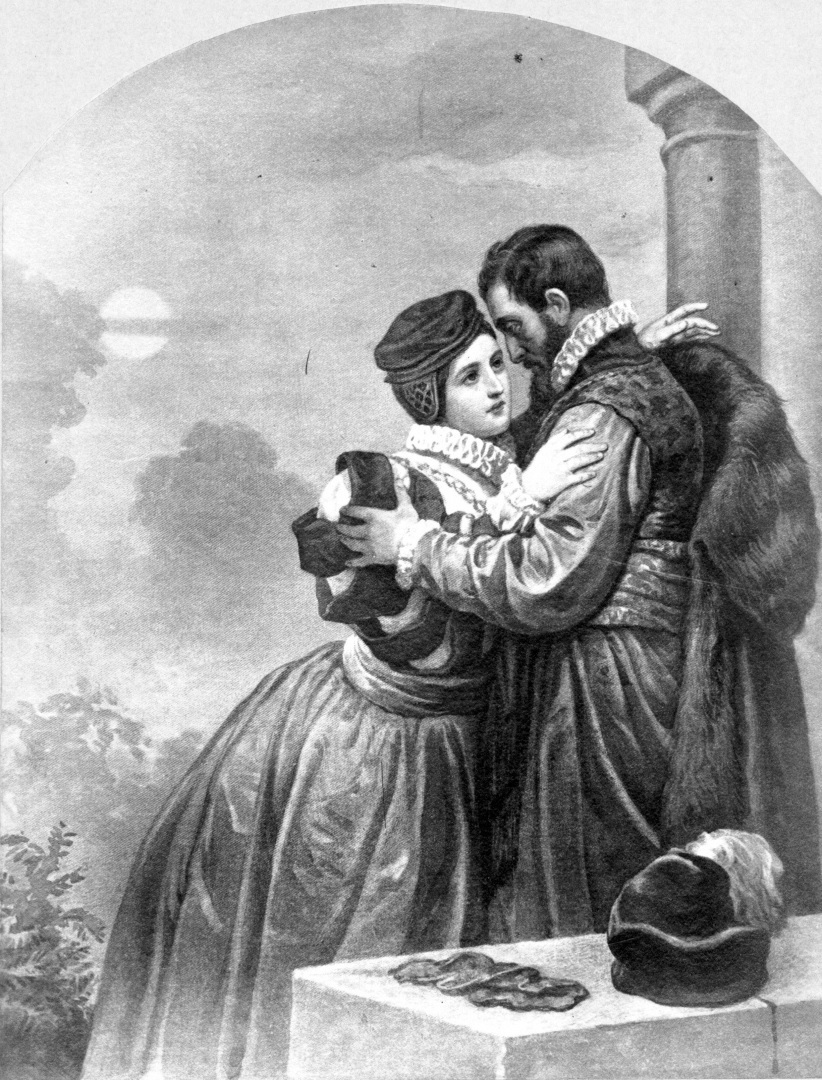
19th-century image of Sigismund Augustus and Barbara Radziwiłł, by Artur Grottger.

Sigismund II Augustus married his first cousin once removed Elizabeth Habsburg on 6 May 1543. They were childless.

After Elizabeth's death on 15 June 1545, in summer 1547, he married his long-time companion – a Lithuanian noblewoman, Barbara Radziwiłł. Their marriage possibly resulted in two miscarried pregnancies:

- First miscarriage reportedly happened after Barbara's long and tiring journey from Vilnius to Dubingiai, on 20 November 1547. Some modern historians speculate that what happened was not the pregnancy loss but that the royal wife instead experienced bleeding that was an early sign of neoplastic disease. Nevertheless, an event was reported as a miscarriage in the letter written to the King by Barbara's courtier and medic, Stanisław Dowojno.
- In the letter written to Barbara on 2 June 1548, Sigismund expressed his joy after she had informed him of another pregnancy. The Queen was either mistaken or miscarried shortly afterwards; it was reported she had fallen ill later in June, possibly as the result of the pregnancy loss.

Barbara died on 8 May 1551. Sigismund II then took his former sister-in-law, Catherine of Austria, as his third wife on 30 July 1553. They expected one child during their marriage:

- In April 1554, it was announced that Catherine was pregnant. In October of the same year, the Queen wrote in a letter to her mother-in-law that there would be no child as "all signs failed". No birth was recorded and, while Catherine suffered haemorrhages during her alleged pregnancy, miscarriage was also not reported to have happened. Sigismund later made two contradictory statements on the matter: that either Catherine pretended she is pregnant with the goal to present him with non-royal foundling, or that "because of the hatred to Poland, she made an effort to achieve miscarriage". Modern researchers' opinions varied whether the Queen lost the child or was not pregnant, with suggestions that she might have suffered from the false pregnancy.

In 1571, Sigismund took as his mistress Barbara Giza, who was said to be his late second wife's look-alike. They had one child:

- Barbara (born 12 September 1571, died after 5 June 1615). Later adopted by her stepfather, Michał Woroniecki. Married Jakub Zawadzki, scribe of the Crown's Treasure.

There is also a record made by chronicler Walerian Nekanda Trepka about another illegitimate daughter, born by an otherwise unknown woman of the surname "Relska", and married to a nobleman Cieszkowski. Modern research suggests that the mother's name was in fact "Regina Rylska" (née Szafarz, secundo voto Lachowska), and her and the King's presumed daughter was:

- Barbara (born around 1560), who was legally the child of her mother's first husband (Jan Rylski); first married Mikołaj Bronowski, then Jan Cieszkowski.

== Royal titles ==
- Royal titles, in Latin: "Sigismundus Augustus, Dei gratia rex Poloniae, magnus dux Lithuaniae, nec non terrarum Cracoviae, Sandomiriae, Siradiae, Lanciciae, Cuiaviae, Kiioviae, dominus hereditarius Russiae, Woliniae, Prussiae, Masoviae, Podlachiae, Culmensis, Elbingensis, Pomeraniae, Samogitiae, Livoniae etc. dominus et heres";
- English translation: "Sigismund Augustus, by the Grace of God, King of Poland, Grand Duke of Lithuania, Lord and heir of the Lands of Kraków, Sandomierz, Sieradz, Łęczyca, Kuyavia, Kiev, Hereditary Lord of Ruthenia, Volhynia, Prussia, Masovia, Podlaskie, Culmer Land, Elbing, Pomerania, Samogitia, Livonia etc. Lord and heir".

== Ancestry ==
Ancestors of Sigismund II Augustus

8. Władysław II Jagiełło
4. Casimir IV, King of Poland
9. Sophia of Halshany
2. Sigismund I the Old
10. Albert II of Germany
5. Elizabeth of Austria
11. Elizabeth of Luxembourg
1. Sigismund II Augustus
12. Galeazzo Maria Sforza
6. Gian Galeazzo Sforza
13. Bona of Savoy
3. Bona Sforza
14. Alfonso II of Naples
7. Isabella of Aragon, Duchess of Milan
15. Ippolita Maria Sforza

== In popular culture ==
He is played by Jerzy Zelnik in 1980 miniseries Queen Bona ("Królowa Bona") and 1983 movie An Epitaph for Barbara Radziwiłł.

== See also ==
- History of Poland (1385–1569)
- History of Poland (1569–1795)
- List of Polish monarchs

== Notes ==
Sigismund II Augustus House of Jagiellon Born: 1 August 1520 Died: 7 July 1572
Regnal titles
Preceded by Sigismund I the Old as sole ruler	King of Poland; 1529 – 1572 with Sigismund I the Old (1529 – 1548)	Vacant Title next held by Henry
Preceded by Sigismund I the Old as sole ruler	Grand Duke of Lithuania; 1529 – 1572 with Sigismund I the Old (1529 – 1548)	Vacant Title next held by Henry
