= Diocese of Amelia =

Former Latin Catholic diocese in Italy

Co-cathedral of S. Firmina, Amelia

The Diocese of Amelia was a Latin Church diocese of the Catholic Church in Italy which was founded, probably, in the fifth century. In 1983, it was united aeque principaliter with the diocese of Terni e Narni. In 1986, both Narni and Amelia were suppressed, and their territories united in the reorganized diocese of Terni-Narni-Amelia. It became a suffragan of the archdiocese of Spoleto.

== History ==
The ancient Amelia, or Ameria as it was called by both Greek and Latin sources, claimed to have been founded earlier than the Trojan War. Pliny the Elder, however, drawing on the work of Cato the Elder, attributes the foundation of Ameria to the Etruscan lucumo Ameroe. It was a Roman municipium in Umbria, as Cicero expounded in his defense speech Pro Roscio Amerino (80 BC). There was a Roman highway called the Via Amerina, which connected the Via Flaminia at Falerii to Perugia, by way of Castello Amerina and Ameria.

The Diocese of Amelia appears relatively late. Ferdinando Ughelli does mention a bishop Orthodolphus, whom he assigns to the year 344. Giuseppe Cappelletti and Francesco Lanzoni, however, are doubtful of the very name. Ughelli mentions also a bishop whom he names Stephen, of whom there is no trace in the evidence. Lanzoni is doubtful of his existence as well.

Bishop Hilarius of Amelia was present at the synod held at Rome on 14 November 465, by Pope Hilary. Bishop Salustius was present at a synod held in S. Peter's Basilica on 1 March 499 under Pope Symmachus. According to Ughelli, in the fifth century there was a Bishop of Amelia by name Sincerus. The Bollandists, however, show that the date of his episcopate is uncertain; there is question even of his very existence.

=== Lombards ===
The city of Amelia had some strategic importance during the eighth century. It was one of four towns (Amelia, Orte, Bomarzo, and Bieda) on the frontier between the Lombard kingdom of Pavia and the Duchy of Spoleto. Repeatedly drawn into the struggle between the Lombard power of Liutprand, who was allied with Charles Martel, in the centre of Italy, and the aggressive policy of the Iconoclast emperors of Byzantium, the towns were repeatedly forced to change masters. To check the growing power of Liutprand, the popes, in particular of Gregory II (715–731) and Pope Gregory III (731–741), offered their support to Duke Transamund II of Spoleto, driven from his duchy to seek protection in Rome, The price for papal support was the conquest of the four towns from Liutprand and their surrender to the Papacy. In 740, with Transimund in exile, a temporary peace was patched up between Liutprand and Gregory III, which left Liutprand in control of the four towns. Transamund failed in his mission, and was twice, in 738 and in 742,

In February 742, the newly elected Pope Zacharias met King Liutprand at Terni, and agreed to a peace. Liutprand was requested to hand over the four towns to the Papacy, and he agreed to do so, apparently in the form of a gift from the king to S. Peter.

The diocese of Amelia was directly subject to the Papacy, until 1983.

=== Chapter and cathedral ===
The cathedral is dedicated to a Roman virgin Firmina, the daughter of a fictitious Prefect of the City of Rome called Calpurnius. She was martyred under Diocletian, and her body buried by one Honorius "not far from the 8th milestone from Ameria." Honorius also buried her near the sea in the town of Centumcellae. Her Passio is not earlier than the 6th century. Her remains, found in Amelia, were not discovered until the time of Pope Hadrian II (867–872) by Bishop Pasquale of Ameria. There is a secondary dedication of the cathedral, to a S. Olympiades.

The cathedral of Amelia was served and administered by an ecclesiastical body called the Chapter, consisting of three dignities, the Prior, the Archdeacon and the Provost, and twelve canons. On 1 October 1265, Pope Clement IV had issued the bull "Dignum Est", in which he limited the number of canons in the cathedral chapter to twelve.

Amelia Cathedral was the seat of the diocese until 1983; is now ranked as a co-cathedral of the Diocese of Terni-Narni-Amelia.

In the city of Amelia there were (in 1770) three parishes, in addition to the cathedral, eight houses of male religious, and six of female religious.

In 1476, fleeing the plague in Rome, Pope Sixtus IV and six cardinals came to Amelia, where they stayed 20 days in the palace of the Geraldines.

==== Synods ====
A diocesan synod was an irregularly held, but important, meeting of the bishop of a diocese and his clergy. Its purpose was (1) to proclaim generally the various decrees already issued by the bishop; (2) to discuss and ratify measures on which the bishop chose to consult with his clergy; (3) to publish statutes and decrees of the diocesan synod, of the provincial synod, and of the Holy See.

Bishop Antonio Maria Graziani (1592–1611) held a diocesan synod in 1595. Another diocesan synod was held by Bishop Giovanni Battista Renzoli (1721–1743) on 8–9 April 1725. Bishop Carlo Fabi (1785–1798) held a synod in 1792, and republished the synodal decrees and a "Life" of Bishop Graziani.

=== Diocesan reorganization ===
On 13 September 1983, Franco Gualdrini, who had been Rector of the Collegium Capranicum in Rome, was appointed bishop of Terni, Narni and Amelia, aeque principaliter. The diocese of Amelia continued to exist intact, though its bishop was also the bishop of another diocese.

The Second Vatican Council (1962–1965), in order to ensure that all Catholics received proper spiritual attention, decreed the reorganization of the diocesan structure of Italy and the consolidation of small and struggling dioceses. It also recommended the abolition of anomalous units such as exempt territorial prelatures.

On 18 February 1984, the Vatican and the Italian State signed a new and revised concordat. Based on the revisions, a set of Normae was issued on 15 November 1984, which was accompanied in the next year, on 3 June 1985, by enabling legislation. According to the agreement, the practice of having one bishop govern two separate dioceses at the same time, aeque personaliter, as was the case with Terni, Narni and Amelia, was to be abolished. Instead, the Vatican continued consultations which had begun under Pope John XXIII for the merging of small dioceses, especially those with personnel and financial problems, into one combined diocese.

On 27 September 1986, Pope John Paul II approved a decree, which was published by the Congregation of Bishops on 30 September 1986. The dioceses of Terni, Narni, and Ameria were united into one single diocese. Its seat was fixed at Terni, where its cathedral remained the cathedral of the united diocese. The former cathedrals at Narni and Ameria were given the honorary rank of co-cathedral. The name of the diocese was to be «Dioecesis Interamnensis-Narniensis-Amerina».

== Bishops of Amelia ==
Erected: 5th Century
Latin Name: Amerinus/a

=== To 1389 ===
...

- Hilarius (465)

[Tiburtinus (466 ?) ]
[Martinianus (487) ]

- Sallustius (499)

...

- Adeodatus (649)
- Theodorus (680)

...

- Pasquale (868–879)

...

- Andreas (972)

...

- Deusdedit (1015)

...

- Jacobus (1116)
- Gerardus (c. 1126 – after 1146)

...

- Petrus (c. 1179)

...

- Obertus (or Gibertus) (c. 1195)
- Jacobus (c. 1196–1217)
- Otho
- Gualterus
- Bartholomaeus (1264–1286)
- Maurus, O.S.B. (1286–1321)
- Michael (1321)
- Alamannus de Galgano (1322–1327)
- Joannes Grocei (1327–1328)
- Mannus (1328–1363)
- Geraldus Roberti, O.F.M. (1363–1372/3)
- Francesco (1373–1389)

=== From 1390 to 1690 ===
- Corrado a Colac (1390–1392) Roman Obedience
- Stefano Bordonus (1392–1410) Roman Obedience
- Andrea Moriconi, O.E.S.A. (1410–1426) Pisan Obedience
- Filippo Ventorelli (10 Apr 1426 – 18 Dec 1442 Died)
- Ugolino Nacci, O.E.S.A. (1443–1444)
- Ruggero Mandosi (1444 – 1484 Resigned)
- Cesare Nacci (31 Mar 1484 – 1504)
- Giustiniano Moriconi (26 Aug 1504 – 1523 Resigned)
- Giovanni Domenico Moriconi (6 Jul 1523 – 1558 Resigned)
- Baldo Ferratini (28 Nov 1558 – 1562 Resigned)
- Bartolomeo Ferratini (iuniore) (9 Oct 1562 – 1571 Resigned)
- Mariano Vittori (17 Dec 1571 – 2 Jun 1572 Appointed, Bishop of Rieti)
- Giovanni Antonio Lazzari (9 Jun 1572 – 28 May 1591)
- Antonio Maria Graziani (1592–1611)
- Antonio Maria Franceschini (18 May 1611 – 25 Aug 1612)
- Francesco Cennini de' Salamandri (1 Oct 1612 –1623)
- Domenico Pichi (20 Nov 1623 – 4 May 1633)
- Torquato Perotti (20 Jun 1633 – Sep 1642 Died)
- Gaudenzio Poli (23 Feb 1643 – 28 May 1679 Died)
- Giuseppe Sallustio Fadulfi (27 Nov 1679 – 15 Jan 1685 Appointed, Bishop of Ascoli Piceno)
- Giovanni Battista Antici (9 Apr 1685 – 17 Jul 1690 Died)

=== After 1690 ===
- Giuseppe Crispini (1690–1721)
- Giovan Battista Renzoli (16 Jul 1721 – Sep 1743)
- Giacomo Filippo Consoli (1743–1770)
- Tommaso Struzzieri (10 Sep 1770 – 1775)
- Francesco Angelo Jacoboni (18 Dec 1775 – 30 Aug 1785)
- Carlo Fabi (26 Sep 1785 – 31 Mar 1798 Died)
- Francesco Maria Gazzoli (11 Aug 1800 – 23 Sep 1805 Appointed, Bishop of Todi)
- Fortunato Maria Pinchetti (31 Mar 1806 – 17 Dec 1827 Resigned)
- Vincenzo Macioti (23 Jun 1828 – 1 Feb 1836 Appointed, Bishop of Ferentino)
- Mariano Brasca Bartocci (11 Jul 1836 – 12 Nov 1850 Resigned)
- Salvatore Valentini (17 Feb 1851 – 2 Aug 1855 Died)
- Nicola Pace (28 Sep 1855 – 6 May 1881 Resigned)
- Eusebio Magner (13 May 1881 – 25 Sep 1882 Appointed, Bishop of Orvieto)
- Eugenio Clari (25 Sep 1882 – 16 Jan 1893 Appointed, Bishop of Viterbo e Tuscania)
- Vincenzo Giuseppe Veneri (16 Jan 1893 – 18 Mar 1906 Died)
- Francesco Maria Berti (1907–1938 Resigned)
- Vincenzo Lojali (1938–1966)

Sede vacante (1966–1983)
- Giovanni Battista Dal Prà, Bishop of Narni e Terni (1966–1973), Apostolic Administrator
- Bartolomeo Santo Quadri, Bishop of Narni e Terni (1973-1983), Apostolic Administrator

13 September 1983: united with the Diocese of Terni e Narni to form the Diocese of Terni, Narni, e Amelia
30 September 1986: diocese of Amelia suppresed

== Sources ==
=== Lists of bishops ===
- Eubel, Conradus, ed. (1913). Hierarchia catholica (in Latin). Vol. 1 (Tomus 1) (second ed.). Münster: Libreria Regensbergiana. p. 437.. Archived.
- Eubel, Conradus, ed. (1914). Hierarchia catholica (in Latin). Vol. 2 (Tomus 2) (second ed.). Münster: Libreria Regensbergiana. p. 231.. Archived.
- Eubel, Conradus, ed. (1923). Hierarchia catholica (in Latin). Vol. 3 (Tomus 3) (second ed.). Münster: Libreria Regensbergiana. p. 294.. Archived.
- Gams, Pius Bonifatius (1873). Series episcoporum Ecclesiae catholicae: quotquot innotuerunt a beato Petro apostolo (in Latin). Ratisbon: Typis et Sumptibus Georgii Josephi Manz. pp. 661–663.
- Gauchat, Patritius (Patrice) (1935). Hierarchia catholica IV (1592-1667) (in Latin). Münster: Libraria Regensbergiana. p. 306.
- Ritzler, Remigius; Sefrin, Pirminus (1952). Hierarchia catholica medii et recentis aevi. Vol. Tomus V (1667-1730). Patavii: Messagero di S. Antonio.
- Ritzler, Remigius; Sefrin, Pirminus (1958). Hierarchia catholica medii et recentis aevi. Vol. Tomus VI (1730-1799). Patavii: Messagero di S. Antonio.
- Ritzler, Remigius; Sefrin, Pirminus (1968). Hierarchia Catholica medii et recentioris aevi (in Latin). Vol. VII (1800–1846). Monasterii: Libreria Regensburgiana.
- Remigius Ritzler; Pirminus Sefrin (1978). Hierarchia catholica Medii et recentioris aevi (in Latin). Vol. VIII (1846–1903). Il Messaggero di S. Antonio.
- Pięta, Zenon (2002). Hierarchia catholica medii et recentioris aevi (in Latin). Vol. IX (1903–1922). Padua: Messagero di San Antonio. ISBN 978-88-250-1000-8.

=== Studies ===
- Bertelli, Gioia (1985). Le diocesi di Amelia, Narni e Otricoli. (in Italian). Spoleto: Centro Italiano di Studi sull'Alto Medioevo.
- Cappelletti, Giuseppe (1846). Le chiese d'Italia: dalla loro origine sino ai nostri giorni (in Italian). Vol. 5 (quinto). Venice: G. Antonelli. pp. 195–211.
- Fraikin, J. (1914). "Amelia," (in French), in: A. Baudrillart (ed), Dictionnaire d'histoire et de géographie ecclésiastiques, Vol. 2 (Paris: Letouzey 1914), pp. 1177-1180.
- Hallenbeck, Jan T. (1982). Pavia and Rome: The Lombard Monarchy and the Papacy in the Eighth Century. Philadelphia: Am. Philosophical Soc. 1982. [Transactions of the American Philosophical Society, vol. 72., no. 4.]
- Kehr, Paul Fridolin (1909). Italia pontificia Vol. IV (Berlin: Weidmann 1909), p. 35. (in Latin)
- Lanzoni, Francesco (1927). Le diocesi d'Italia dalle origini al principio del secolo VII (an. 604) (in Italian). Rome: Biblioteca Apostolica Vaticana. pp. 417–419.
- Schwartz, Gerhard (1907). Die Besetzung der Bistümer Reichsitaliens unter den sächsischen und salischen Kaisern: mit den Listen der Bischöfe, 951-1122. (in German). Leipzig: B.G. Teubner. pp. 278-279.
- Ughelli, Ferdinando; Coleti, Nicolò (1717). Italia sacra: sive De episcopis Italiae et insularum adjacentium (in Latin). Vol. 1 (Tomus primus). Venice: apud Sebastianum Coleti. pp. 295–305.
