= Barbara Giza =

- Born: c. 1550; Warsaw
- Died: May 1589
- Spouse: Michał Woroniecki
- Partner: Sigismund II Augustus of Poland (1571-1572; his death)
- Children: 7, including Barbara

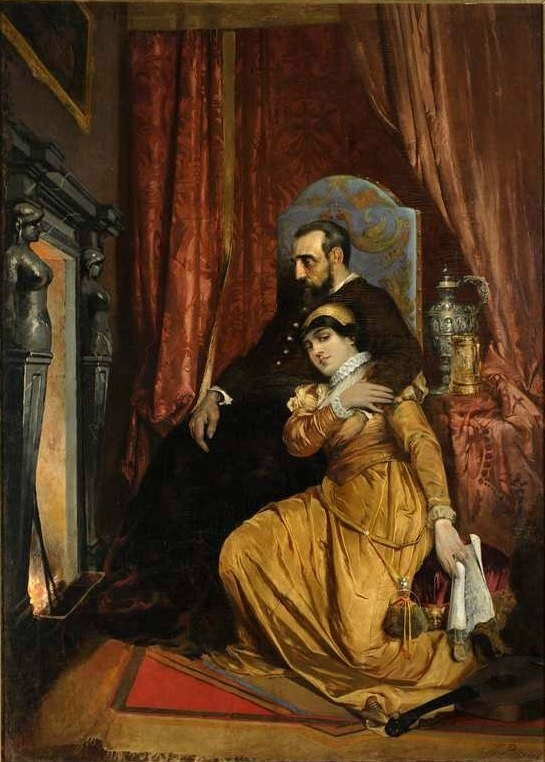
Zygmunt August and Barbara Giżanka, Tadeusz Popiel, 1901, oil on canvas.

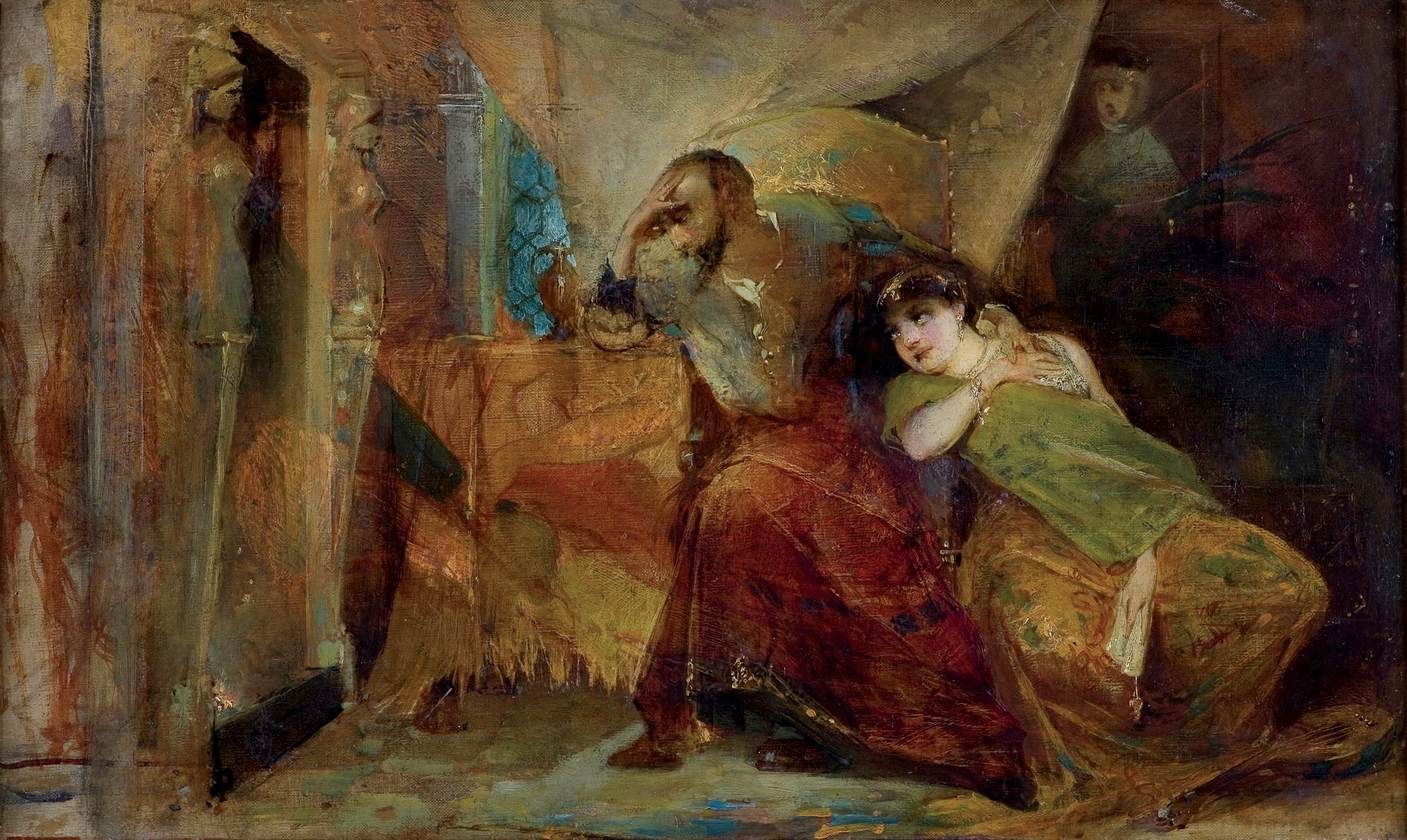
Zygmunt August and Barbara Giżanka, Maurycy Gottlieb, c. 1874

Barbara Giza (Polish: Barbara Gizanka; c. 1550 – May 1589), was a mistress of King Sigismund II Augustus of Poland during 1570–72. She was a daughter of a Warsaw burgher Jan Giza, a merchant and usurer, and his wife Anna, whose origins are unknown.

Barbara was a Protestant, and she is sometimes given credit for influencing the King towards religious tolerance of Protestants.

Near the end of King Sigismund II Augustus' life, after the death of his wife, he expressed a desire to marry Barbara with the hope of producing an heir. However, he died before a marriage could take place.

== Life ==
According to tradition, she was born in a tenement house at 5 Świętojańska Street in a Warsaw patrician family from Franconia. She had a sister who was married to Krzysztof Szawłowski. She grew up in a convent of Bernardine nuns outside Warsaw. Young Barbara was met by the royal servant, Mikołaj Mniszech. The Jewish merchant Egidius made his visits to Gizanka easier. Mniszech visited Barbara in the guise of a nun. The circumstances in which Barbara met the King are unknown. Probably Mniszech family used the girl's physical resemblance to the late Queen Barbara Radziwiłł to gain influence over the King. Most likely, Barbara met Sigismund II Augustus at the end of 1570, but according to an investigation carried out after the King's death, Barbara was brought to the king on 6 January 1571. Their relationship attracted considerable attention and was regarded as a scandal.

Eight months later, on 8 September 1571, she gave birth to a daughter, Barbara. The nobility didn't believe in the King's paternity, but Sigismund II Augustus didn't pay attention to the voices of the opposing court. After her daughter was born, Barbara became the King's constant companion. He awarded her with 20,000 złoty and arranged a palace for her in Bronów. Moreover, despite his relationship with Barbara, Sigismund II Augustus also continued his affair with Anna Zajączkowska, who was staying in Witów.

Thanks to Barbara's intercession, the Vice-Chancellor Franciszek Krasiński obtained the position of the Bishop of Kraków, and the Grand Crown Marshal Jan Firlej secured his position of Voivode of Kraków. After the death of the Queen Catherine of Austria in February 1572, rumors circulated that Sigismund II Augustus wanted to marry Barbara. In June 1572, Barbara left with her lover to Knyszyn, where on 7 July the King died aged 51.

Before 14 July 1573, Barbara Giza married Michał Woroniecki, Prince of Volhynia, who legally recognized her daughter. Six children were born from this marriage: Mikołaj (died after 1601), Stefan (a priest; died after 1614), Jakub (died after 1621), Florian Tomasz (a Dominican friar in Warsaw; born 1586, died after 5 June 1615), Katarzyna (wife of Jakub Pilchowski; died after 1592) and Anna (wife of Jan Kosiński; died after 1614).

== Bibliography ==
- Rudzki E., Polskie królowe, t. 2, wyd. 2, Instytut Prasy i Wydawnictw Novum, Warsaw 1990, pp. 265–266.
- Boniecki, Adam, Poczet rodów w Wielkiém Księstwie Litewskiém w XV i XVI wieku, [print:] J. Berger, Warsaw 1887, pp. 387–388. (online)
- Szenic, Stanisław, Królewskie kariery warszawianek, Iskry, Warsaw 1959, s. 5–47.
- Wdowiszewski, Zygmunt (2005). Genealogia Jagiellonów i Domu Wazów w Polsce. Kraków: Jan Tęgowski (ed.) Krakow: Avalon Publishing House. pp. 128–129. ISBN 83-918497-2-4. OCLC 69468579.
