= Giovanni Battista Antici =

Most Reverend Giovanni Battista Antici
- Bishop of Amelia,
- Church: Catholic Church
- Diocese: Diocese of Amelia
- In office: 1685–1690
- Predecessor: Giuseppe Sallustio Fadulfi
- Successor: Giuseppe Crispini

Orders
- Ordination: 6 April 1658
- Consecration: 23 April 1685 by Alessandro Crescenzi (cardinal)

Personal details
- Born: 17 July 1631 Recanati, Italy
- Died: 17 July 1690 (age 59) Amelia, Italy

Giovanni Battista Antici (17 July 1631 – 17 July 1690) was a Roman Catholic prelate who served as Bishop of Amelia from 1685 to 1690.

== Biography ==
Giovanni Battista Antici was born in Recanati, Italy, on 17 July 1631 and ordained a priest on 6 April 1658.

On 9 April 1685, he was appointed during the papacy of Pope Innocent XI as Bishop of Amelia. On 23 April 1685, he was consecrated bishop by Alessandro Crescenzi, Cardinal-Priest of Santa Prisca, with Diego Petra, Archbishop of Sorrento, and Pier Antonio Capobianco, Bishop Emeritus of Lacedonia, serving as co-consecrators.

He served as Bishop of Amelia until his death on 17 July 1690.

== See also ==
- Catholic Church in Italy

== External links and additional sources ==
- Cheney, David M. "Diocese of Amelia". Catholic-Hierarchy.org. (for Chronology of Bishops) ^{[self-published]}
- Chow, Gabriel. "Diocese of Terni–Narni–Amelia (Italy)". GCatholic.org. (for Chronology of Bishops) ^{[self-published]}

Catholic Church titles
Preceded by Giuseppe Sallustio Fadulfi	Bishop of Amelia; 1685–1690	Succeeded by Giuseppe Crispini
