= Antonio Maria Graziani =

17th-century Roman Catholic bishop

Most Reverend Antonio Maria Graziani
- Bishop of Amelia
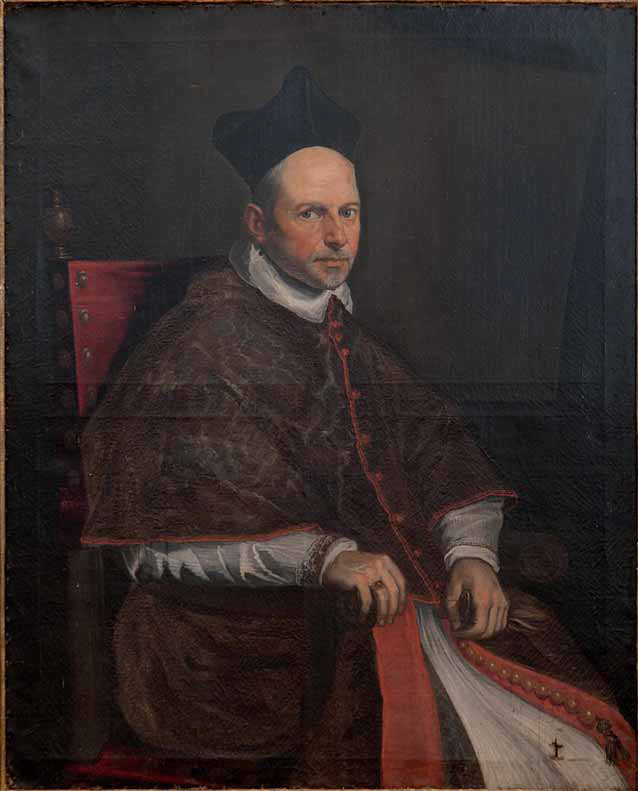
- Portrait by Domenico Tintoretto (1598)
- Church: Catholic Church
- Diocese: Roman Catholic Diocese of Amelia
- In office: 1592–1611
- Predecessor: Giovanni Antonio Lazzari
- Successor: Antonio Maria Franceschini

Orders
- Consecration: 25 Feb 1592 by Antonmaria Sauli

Personal details
- Born: 1537 Sansepolcro, Italy
- Died: 1 Apr 1611 (age 74)

Antonio Maria Graziani (1537–1611) was a Roman Catholic prelate who served as Bishop of Amelia (1592–1611) and Apostolic Nuncio to Venice (1596–1598).

== Biography ==
Antonio Maria Graziani was born in 1537 in Sansepolcro, Italy. On 17 Feb 1592, he was appointed during the papacy of Pope Clement VIII as Bishop of Amelia. On 25 Feb 1592, he was consecrated bishop by Antonmaria Sauli, Cardinal-Priest of San Vitale, with Fabio Biondi, Titular Patriarch of Jerusalem, and Fantino Petrignani, Archbishop Emeritus of Cosenza, serving as co-consecrators. On 23 Feb 1596, he was appointed during the papacy of Pope Clement VIII as Apostolic Nuncio to Venice; he resigned from the position on 8 Oct 1598. He served as Bishop of Amelia until his death on 1 Apr 1611.

While bishop, he was the principal co-consecrator of Roberto Pierbenedetti, Bishop of Nocera Umbra (1592).

== Publications ==
- Graziani, A. (1624). Antonii Mariæ Gratiani a Burgo S. Sepulchri episcopi Amerini De bello Cyprio libri quinque. Roma: apud Alexandrum Zanettum.
- Graziani, A. and Midgley, R. (1687). The History of the War of Cyprus. Written Originally in Latin. With a New Map of the Island. London: J. Rowlings.

== Bibliography and external links ==
- Marsili, Marcella (2002). "GRAZIANI, Antonio Maria". Dizionario Biografico degli Italiani (in Italian). Vol. 58: Gonzales–Graziani. Rome: Istituto dell'Enciclopedia Italiana. ISBN 978-88-12-00032-6.
- Lettere di Pieter de Witte. Pietro Candido nei carteggi di Antonio Maria Graziani (1569-1574), edizione critica di Massimo Moretti, Roma, De Luca Editori d'Arte, 2012.
- Moretti, Massimo, 'Ottaviano Mascarino e Antonio Maria Graziani vescovo di Amelia (1592-1611)', in 'I Petrignani di Amelia: Fasti, committenze, collezioni, tra Roma e l’Umbria', San Gabriele-Isola del Gran Sasso, Edizioni Stauròs, 2012, pp. 117-121, pp. 223-252.
- Moretti, Massimo, I fratelli Alberti pittori di Sansepolcro, i Petrignani e Antonio Maria Graziani, in 'I Petrignani di Amelia: Fasti, committenze, collezioni, tra Roma e l'Umbria', San Gabriele-Isola del Gran Sasso, Edizioni Stauròs, 2012, pp. 253-257.
- Moretti, Massimo,«Quel ritratto di V. S. R.ma»: Domenico Tintoretto e il nunzio a Venezia Antonio Maria Graziani (1537-1611), in “Storia dell’arte”, 2012, 132, pp. 38-45.
- Moretti, Massimo, Committenti, intermediari e pittori tra Roma e Venezia attorno al 1600. I ritratti di Domenico Tintoretto per il nunzio Graziani e una perduta Pentecoste di Palma il Giovane per Fabio Biondi, in “Storia dell'arte”, 2015, 141, pp. 21-42.
- Cheney, David M. "Diocese of Amelia". Catholic-Hierarchy.org. (for Chronology of Bishops) ^{[self-published]}
- Chow, Gabriel. "Diocese of Terni–Narni–Amelia (Italy)". GCatholic.org. (for Chronology of Bishops) ^{[self-published]}
- Moretti, Massimo, Antonio Maria Graziani e le fatiche della carriera. L'altare di famiglia a Sansepolcro e la commissione dell'"Assunta" a Palma il Giovane, in “Storia dell’arte”, [150], 2018, 2, pp. 18-67.
- Moretti, Massimo, L'altare Graziani da Raffaello a Palma il Giovane. Una copia della "Madonna" Canossa e una "sentenza" sfavorevole a Giovanni De' Vecchi, in “Storia dell’arte”, [155-156], 2021, 1/2, pp. 61-87.
- Moretti, Massimo, L'«ardentissimo desiderio di gloria e di honore»: una Battaglia di Lepanto di Federico Zuccari per Venezia, mai dipinta, nella corrispondenza di Antonio Maria Graziani, in L’Archivio di Caravaggio. Studi in onore di don Sandro Corradini, a cura di Pietro Di Loreto, Foligno, Etgraphiiae, 2021, pp. 203-214.

Catholic Church titles
Preceded by Giovanni Antonio Lazzari	Bishop of Amelia; 1592–1611	Succeeded by Antonio Maria Franceschini
Preceded by Ludovico Taverna	Apostolic Nuncio to Venice; 1596–1598	Succeeded by Offredo de Offredi
