= Gaudenzio Poli =

17th-century Roman Catholic bishop

Most Reverend Gaudenzio Poli
- Bishop of Amelia
- Church: Catholic Church
- Diocese: Diocese of Amelia
- In office: 1643–1679
- Predecessor: Torquato Perotti
- Successor: Giuseppe Sallustio Fadulfi

Orders
- Consecration: 8 Mar 1643 by Faustus Poli

Personal details
- Born: 1609 Castello Scheggino, Italy
- Died: 28 May 1679 (age 70)

Gaudenzio Poli (1609–1679) was a Roman Catholic prelate who served as Bishop of Amelia (1643–1679).

== Biography ==
Gaudenzio Poli was born in 1609 in Castello Scheggino, Italy and ordained a deacon in Jan 1643. On 23 Feb 1643, he was appointed during the papacy of Pope Urban VIII as Bishop of Amelia. On 8 Mar 1643, he was consecrated bishop by Faustus Poli, Titular Archbishop of Amasea, with Giovanni Battista Altieri (seniore), Bishop Emeritus of Camerino, and Lelio Falconieri, Titular Archbishop of Thebae, serving as co-consecrators. He served as Bishop of Amelia until his death on 28 May 1679.

While bishop, he was the principal co-consecrator of Rodolpho Acquaviva, Titular Bishop of Laodicea in Phrygia and Apostolic Nuncio to Switzerland (1668).

== External links and additional sources ==
- Cheney, David M. "Diocese of Amelia". Catholic-Hierarchy.org. (for Chronology of Bishops) ^{[self-published]}
- Chow, Gabriel. "Diocese of Terni–Narni–Amelia (Italy)". GCatholic.org. (for Chronology of Bishops) ^{[self-published]}

Catholic Church titles
Preceded by Torquato Perotti	Bishop of Amelia; 1643–1679	Succeeded by Giuseppe Sallustio Fadulfi
