= Stanisław Szenic =

Polish lawyer and writer

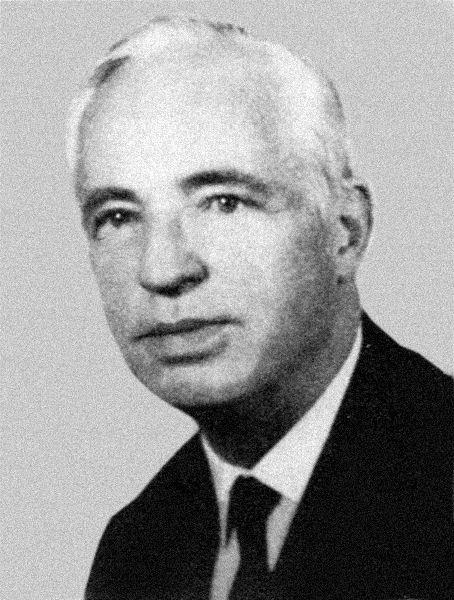

Stanisław Szenic (13 January 1904, Pakość - 28 November 1987, Warsaw) was a Polish lawyer and writer.

He graduated from the Gymnasium at Inowrocław and the Department of Law and Economics at the University of Poznan, before working as a judge for Poland's Foreign Ministry and Justice Ministry. From October 1944 Szenic, Bolesław Rumiński and Alfred Wiślicki prepared an operational group and he was a representative of the Economic Council of Ministers sent to acquire industrial facilities in Poznań province in 1945. At Poznan he was elected the president of the Polish Union of Western Affairs.

From 1945 to 1948 he was a member of the Polish Military Mission in Berlin, at the rank of lieutenant, and was later the Head of the Polish Institute of International Affairs and chief editor of German literature at the State Publishing Institute (1955–1962), among other duties.

His first book, published in 1937, was a commentary on the legal acquisition of citizenship under the Geneva Convention on Upper Silesia. After World War II, he issued several books on the history of Poland (Warsaw, in particular).

== Selected works ==
- Generałowie i Hitler
- Za zachodnią miedzą
- Pitaval warszawski
- Pitaval wielkopolski
- Maria Szymanowska i jej czasy (with T. Syga)
- Maria Kalergis
- Franciszek Liszt
- Większy niż król ten książę
- Ongiś
- Najstarszy szlak Warszawy (with Józef Chudek)
- Królewskie kariery warszawianek
- Ochmistrzynie i faworyty królewskie
- Larum na traktach Warszawy
- Mars i Syrena
- Ani triumf, ani zgon
- Cmentarz Powązkowski (3 parts - 1790-1850, 1851-1890, 1891-1918)
