= Giovanni Antonio Lazzari =

Italian Baroque painter (1639–1713)

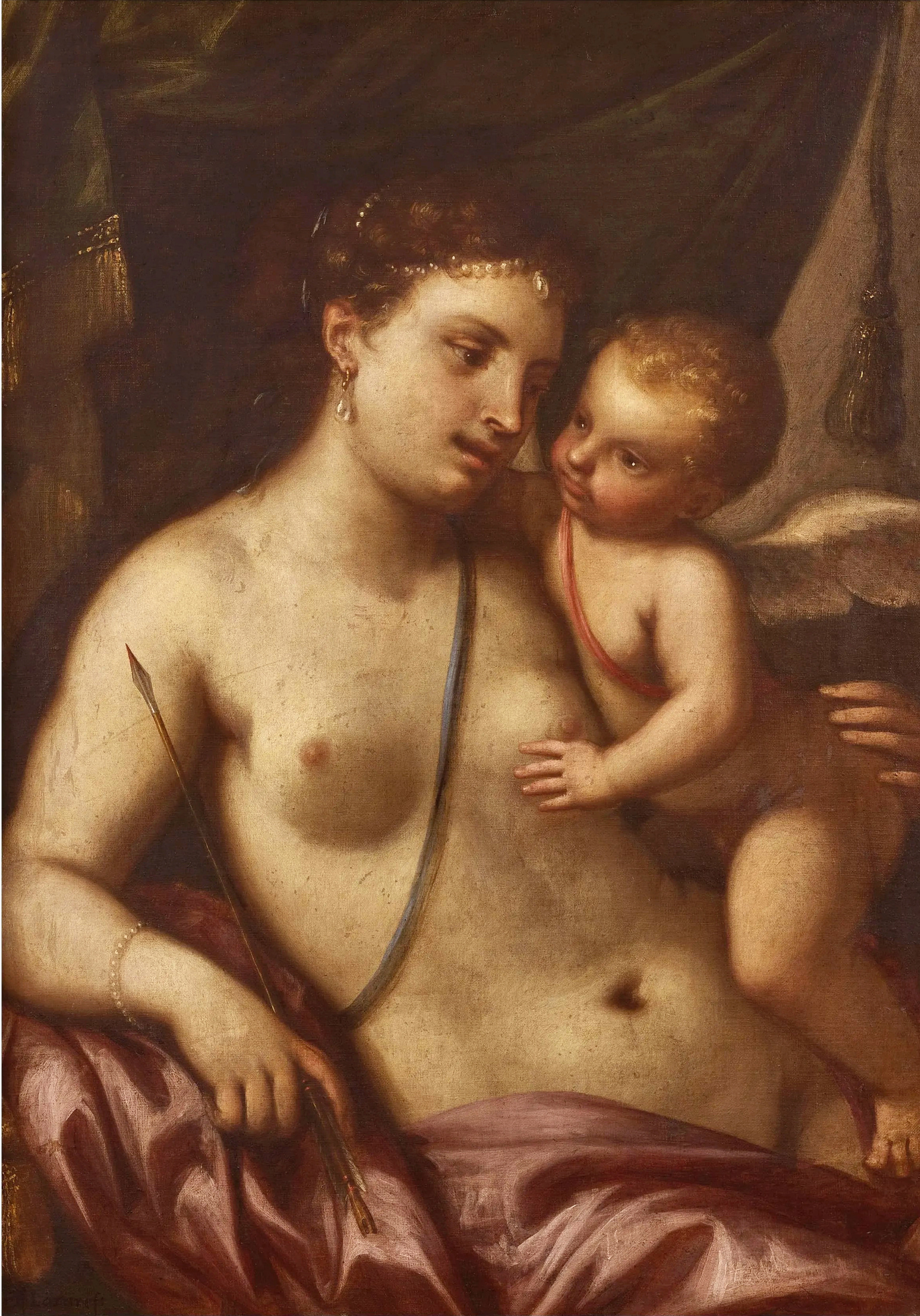
Venus and Cupid, oil on canvas

Giovanni Antonio Lazzari (1639 – 12 April 1713) was an Italian late Baroque painter active in Venice.

== Biography ==
The biographical information that has survived does not allow us to trace a detailed narrative of his life and artistic activity. The earliest testimonies available are those provided by his contemporary painter and writer Nadal Melchiori in 1720 and, in the early decades of the nineteenth century, by the biographer Filippo de Boni and by the abbot Luigi Antonio Lanzi. The latter, in justification of his succinct account, specifies that Giovanni Antonio Lazzari ... had talent, ... but an innate shyness always hindered his fame.

Lazzari was born in Venice in 1639 and his artistic education developed on the foundations of the rich Venetian pictorial tradition. In his youth, he frequented the studio of the painters Pietro Liberi, Giovan Battista Langetti, and Giuseppe Diamantini. His career unfolded in the Veneto region, primarily in Venice, where he participated in the artistic community, earning the title of Eques (Knight), with which he signed himself. A portrait of him (lost), executed by the painter and biographer Nadal Melchiori, was also titled “Antonio Lazari, Venetian Citizen, and Constantinian Knight”. He excelled as a pastelist; nevertheless, he created works with late-Baroque connotations on canvas and panel for various commissions, primarily ecclesiastical and intended for sacred buildings in the Veneto region, which have long since been lost. He was also the teacher of the more famous Rosalba Carriera. He died in Venice on April 12, 1713.

== Works ==
- Busto ritratto femminile, pastel on paper, mm. 600 x 480, 1708 – 1713, Museo Ca’ Rezzonico
- Busto ritratto di bambino, pastel on paper, mm. 500 x 390, 1708–1713, Museo Ca’ Rezzonico
- Ritratto di Caterina Foscarini Grimani, pastel on paper, mm. 350 x 300, 1713, Museo Correr
- Busto ritratto maschile, pastel on paper, mm. 600 x 480, 1708 – 1713, Museo Ca’ Rezzonico
- Venere e Cupido, oil on canvas, signed, cm. 98 x 65,5, private collection

The following works, created for the church of the former convent of the Poor Clares in Castelfranco Veneto, are documented in ancient texts but have been lost:

• The Angel's Fight with Jacob

• Abraham and the Sacrifice of Isaac • Daniel and the Lions

• Hagar and the Angel

• Virgin and Child

A similar fate befell a panel for the parish church of Coste d'Asolo depicting Mary, Saint Joseph, and Saint Anthony[7] and an altarpiece for the church on the island of Poveglia. Other works, not further detailed, were reported in 1840 by the biographer De Boni in Vicenza, Cittadella and in the Polesine area.

== Bibliography ==
Emmanuel Bénézit, Dictionnaire critique et documentaire des Peintres, Sculpteurs et Graveurs, Tome V, Gründ, 1966, ad vocem.

Neil Jeffares, Dictionary of pastellists before 1800, Unicorn Press, Greensboro (NC), 2006, ad vocem. Online edition pdf.
