= Santa Restituta, Narni =

Roman Catholic church

Coordinates: 42.5215°N 12.5137°E

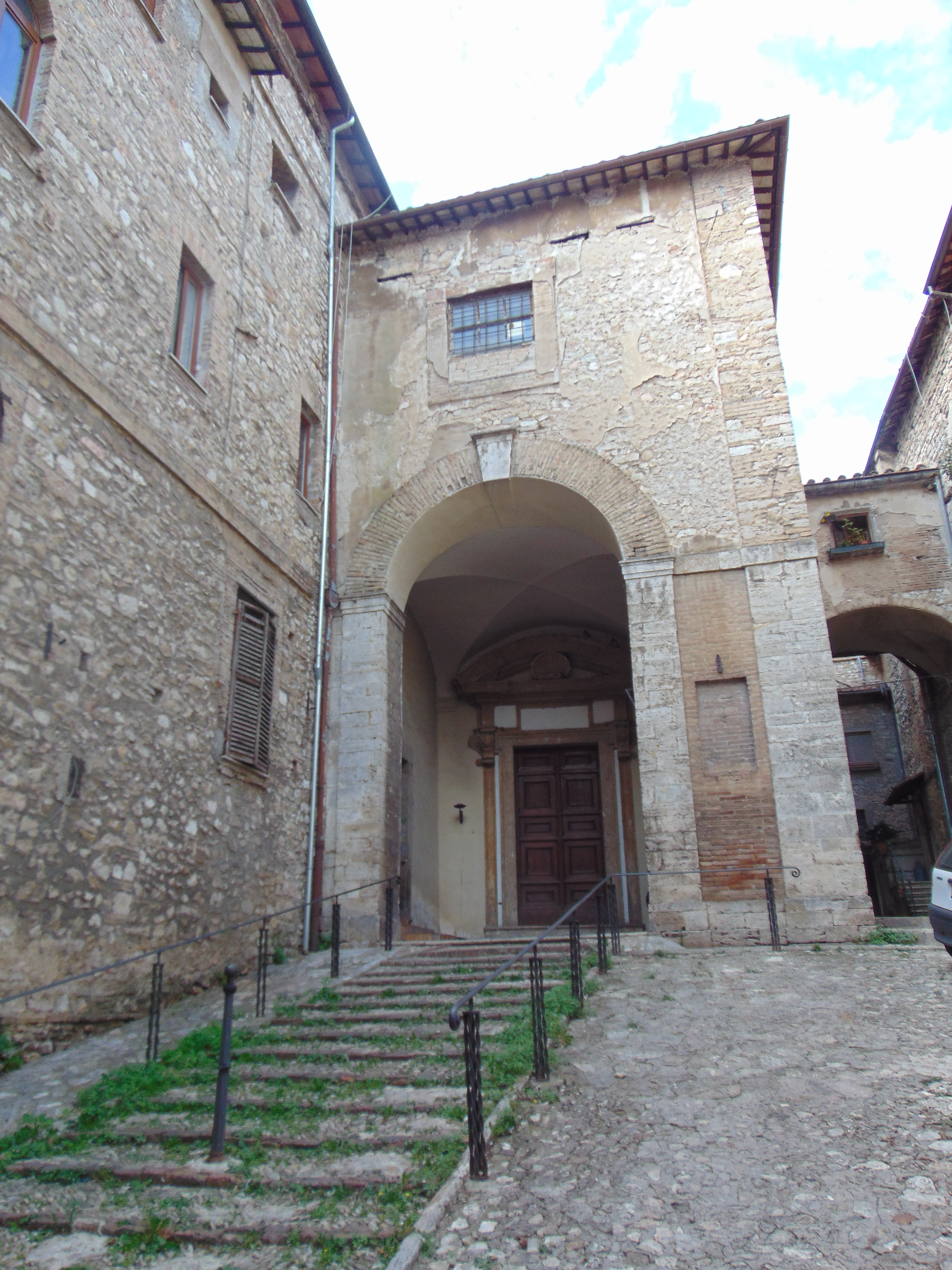

Santa Restituta is a small Roman Catholic church, once attached to a Clarissan convent in the town of Narni, province of Terni, region of Umbria, Italy.

The monastery of Clarissans of the third order was founded in 1562 by Suora Eusebia Borghese, a nun who had fled Siena during it siege by Florentine forces. Having made her way to Rome, then to Loreto, she was commissioned by the local aristocrat Paolo Orsini and bishop Pier Donato Cesi to establish a monastery in Narni, dedicated to the Ancient Roman martyr, Restituta. The church had been previously a parish church for the community. Upon the death of Borghese in 1590, the situation of the convent was dire, given the poverty of the nuns. An endowment by the Marquis of Riano, Paolo Emilio Cesi, alleviated the financial difficulties. He visited the site in 1604, and endowed the church at the cost of 400 gold scudi with an altarpiece depicting the Visitation of St Elizabeth, attributed to the Cavaliere d'Arpino. He also endowed the church with a number of silver and gilded sacramental objects, including a crucifix, candelabra, and a eucharist home. Finally the church also acquired an altarpiece depicting putatively the Birth of St John the Baptist, attributed to Antonio Gherardi. The painting derives from the razed church of San Giovanni Decollato.

The remaining nuns of the convent of Santa Margherita moved here in the late 19th century.
