= Juvenal of Benevento =

Saint Juvenal of Benevento
- Born: Narni, Italy
- Died: 132
- Venerated in: Roman Catholic Church; Eastern Orthodox Church
- Canonized: Pre-congregation
- Major shrine: Benevento, Italy
- Feast: 7 May

Saint Juvenal of Benevento (died 132 AD) is a 2nd-century saint honored in Narni, Italy. His shrine is in Benevento, Italy and his feast day is May 7.
