= San Francesco, Narni =

Building in Narni, Italy

Coordinates: 42.519°N 12.515°E

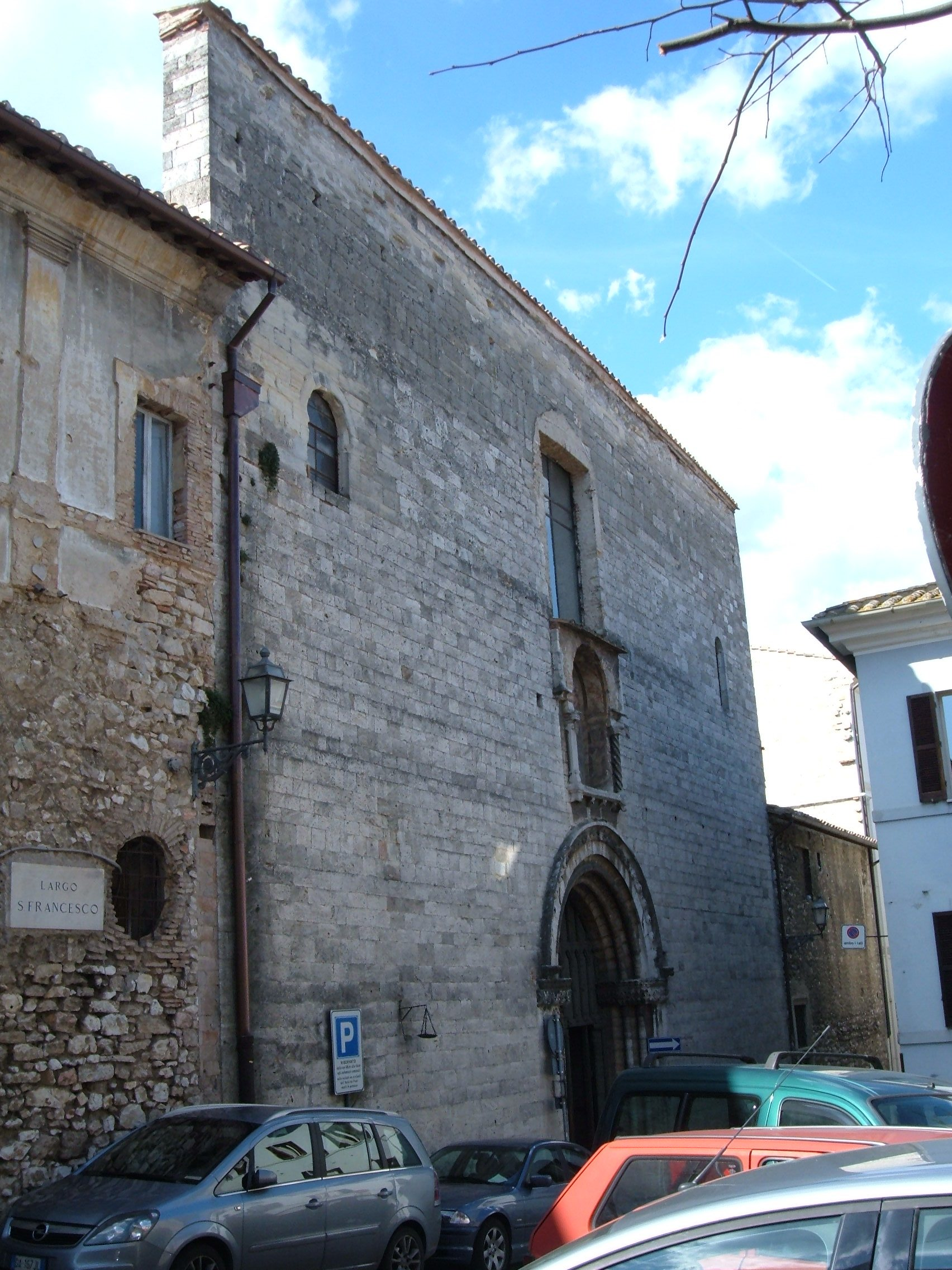
Facade of San Francesco

Santa Francesco is a late Romanesque and Gothic style, Roman Catholic church, located near the Palazzo dei Priori, in the town of Narni, province of Terni, region of Umbria, Italy.

The plain square facade of the church is dominated by an awkward broad but sculpted portal arch, surmounted by an aedicule and a now rectangular window. The interior however has three naves separated by delicate columns delineating side chapels, and ribbed apse and ceilings characteristic of Gothic buildings; the layout is generally that of Latin Cross. Like many Franciscan churches the interior was profusely frescoed.

It is said the church was built atop the spot where St Francis resided while in Narni. He had been invited to the town by the then bishop Ugolino, and putatively completed a series of miracles. Construction seems to have started soon after his death, and some cite completion of the church and adjacent convent by 1260.

The convent changed hands during the following centuries, and after suppression under French rule, the church was utilized as a warehouse and stables. Restoration and reconsecration occurred in 1885 under the patronage of the Eroli family and the Confraternity of the Misericordia.

Under the main altar are the relics of the blessed Matteo Prosperi.

Among the most decorated of the chapels is the one on the right belonging to the Eroli family. The church was frescoed circa 1461 likely by Pier Antonio Mezzastris, and depicts eight scenes of the Life of St Francis: On left:

- 1) St Francis expels demons from Arezzo
- 2) Dream of Pope Innocent III, occurring after denying Francis the permission to found monastic order; he dreamt of Francis holding up the Basilica of San Giovanni Laterano. This led this Pope to approve his monastic vows.
- 3) St Francis and his companions find approval with the pope.
- 4) Encounter of Francis and St Dominic in India

On Right: Encounter of Francis and the Cardinal and Bishop of Ostia, wherein Francis predicts his future ascent; and three depictions of Miracles of Francis in Narni

The sacristy has frescoes by Alessandro Torresani depicting an Annuciation, Adoration by the Magi, Marriage at Cana, and Christ the Redeemer.
