= San Domenico, Narni =

Building in Narni, Italy

Coordinates: 42.521°N 12.514°E

San Domenico is a Romanesque style church located on via Mazzini in the center of the town of Narni in the province of Terni, region of Umbria, Italy.

== History ==
The church was erected putatively at the site of a pagan temple dedicated to Minerva. This church was once the town's cathedral and dedicated to Santa Maria Assunta. It was rededicated to St Dominic and assigned to monks of the Dominican order in 1304. The church has undergone a number of refurbishments. The stone facade has an eclectic collection of Romanesque sculpture with both plants, animals, and framed busts of the apostles. The windows vary in size. The interior has three naves, divided by broad pillars. On the walls of the nave are frescoes dating from the 13th to the late 16th century. The second pillar has a fresco depicting the Crucifixion attributed to the Master of the Dormition. On the left-hand nave, a fresco depicts the Virgin and child with Saints Dominic and Thomas attributed to followers of Pier Matteo d'Amelia. A marble tabernacle once in the church attributed to followers of Agostino di Duccio, has been moved to the Pinacoteca Civica.

The Chapel of the Rosary was frescoed by late 15th century by Flemish artists with stories from Genesis. The crypt likely dates to before the 12th century.
