= Narni =

- Comune
- Comune di Narni
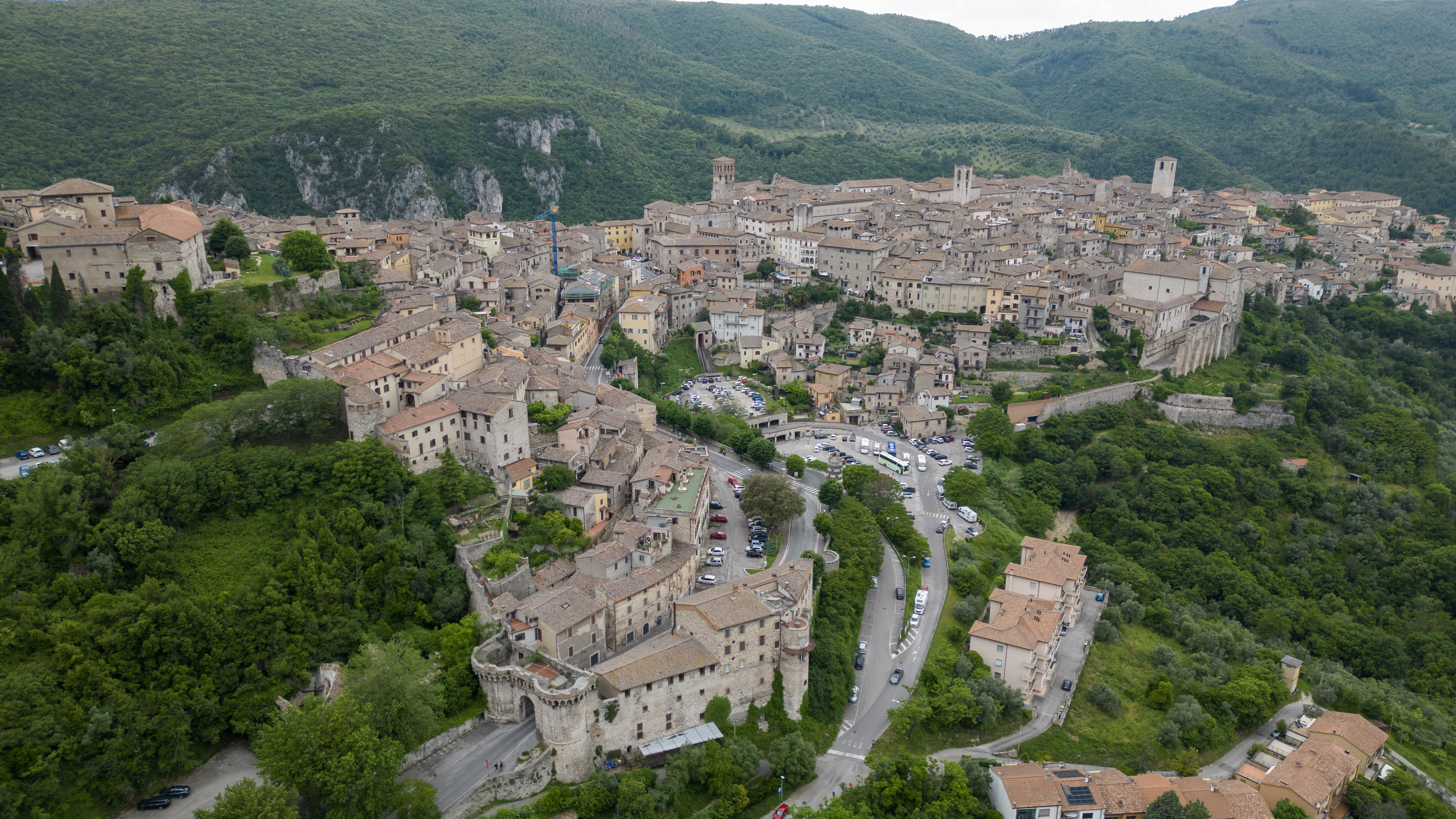
- View of Narni

- Flag Coat of arms

- Location within Italy Location within Umbria
- Coordinates: 42.519298°N 12.515138°E
- Country: Italy
- Region: Umbria
- Province: Terni (TR)

Government
  - Mayor: Lorenzo Lucarelli (PD)

Area
  - Total: 197 km^{2} (76 sq mi)
- Elevation: 240 m (790 ft)

Population (1 January 2025)
  - Total: 17,769
  - Density: 90.2/km^{2} (234/sq mi)
- Demonym: Narnesi
- Time zone: UTC+1 (CET)
  - Summer (DST): UTC+2 (CEST)
- Postal code: 05035–05036
- Dialing code: 0744
- Patron saint: Juvenal of Narni
- Saint day: 3 May
- Website: Official website

Narni (Latin: Narnia) is an ancient hilltown and comune (municipality) of Umbria, in central Italy. At an altitude of 240 metres (790 ft), it overhangs a narrow gorge of the River Nera in the province of Terni. It is very close to the geographical centre of Italy. There is a stone on the exact spot with a sign in multiple languages.

== Etymology ==
Narni, ancient Narnia (Greek: Ναρνία), derived its name from the nearby river Nera (or Nar). Before the Roman conquest it appears to have been called Nequinum.

In the 19th century, the scholar Adone Palmieri attributed the ancient name Nequinum to the Latin nequitia, referring to the supposed ferocity of its early inhabitants.

== History ==
=== Antiquity ===
Narni was an important Umbrian city. In 300 BC it was besieged by the consul Appuleius; the inhabitants resisted vigorously, and the siege continued into the following year, when the city was taken by the consul Marcus Fulvius, who celebrated a triumph over the Samnites and the people of Nequinum. The Roman Senate secured the conquest by establishing a colony there, named Narnia from the nearby Nera river.

The city is later listed among the thirty Latin colonies at the time of the Second Punic War. In 209 BC, having refused assistance to Rome along with other colonies, it was severely punished and compelled to provide a double military contingent and a considerable sum of money. During the same war Narni served as a strategic stronghold against the threatened advance of Hasdrubal toward Rome, and from there cavalrymen set out who were the first to bring news to Rome of the victory at the Battle of the Metaurus.

The rediscovery, in the late 20th century, of the Roman shipyard of Stifone within its territory has made researchers hypothesize its particular importance during the Punic Wars.

In the Republican period Narni appears as a flourishing municipium and one of the principal centers of Umbria, its prosperity attributed to its position on the Via Flaminia and to the fertility of the surrounding countryside, especially the Valnerina. It belonged to the Papiria tribe.

During the civil wars between Vespasian and Vitellius, Narni was occupied by the Vitellians as a strongly fortified position.

Christianity was introduced to Narni through Saint Felician, bishop of Foligno, and especially Saint Juvenal of Carthage, who became its first bishop in 368 or 369 by decree of Pope Damasus I.

=== Early Middle Ages ===
In the period after the end of Roman rule Narni faced barbarian invasions. Its commanding position over the Via Flaminia also gave it importance during the wars of Belisarius and Narses against the Goths.

Narni was contested by the Exarchate of Ravenna and the Lombard Duchy of Spoleto in the late 6th century as the city controlled the southern reaches of the Via Flaminia, an essential route between Rome and Ravenna.

Saint Cassius, who also held the episcopate of Terni, was a distinguished bishop; during his time Totila devastated and plundered Narni. He was regarded as a man of great intellect and deep religiosity, and was adopted as advocate and patron of the city.

In the pontificate of Gregory II, after 726, Narni, then part of the Duchy of Rome, passed under papal rule when the duchy submitted to the Roman Church. Liutprand, king of the Lombards, occupied the city, but Pope Zachary obtained its restitution in 741 together with its territory. Aistulf, also king of the Lombards, likewise seized territories of the Church including Narni, but was compelled to restore them by King Pepin at the request of Pope Stephen III.

In 755 Fulrad went to "Rome carrying the keys of these towns, which he handed to the Pope".

During the late 9th to early 10th century, Narni was, along with much of central Italy, threatened by the Saracens.

In 958 Narni formed a Lombard gastaldate. By 1143 Narni had become a self-governing municipality with its own statutes.

=== High and Late Middle Ages ===
Conrad offered homage and tribute for certain Church lands he held, but, having been refused by Pope Innocent III, he was compelled to restore them and swore obedience at Narni in the presence of the papal legate, the barons, and the people. The pope confirmed the privileges of the cities thus restored. Narni alone required military intervention; the conflict ended with the restitution of the fortresses, a levy for the walls, a fine, and renewed submission to Innocent III. Conrad was then required to return to Germany, after which the pope was able to visit the Duchy of Spoleto.

In the early 13th century it sought to block Terni's resurgence after Frederick Barbarossa, taking Monte Sant'Angelo and Papigno, key points on the road to Rieti, and entering a prolonged conflict over the castle of Stroncone. In 1209 Pope Innocent III placed Narni under interdict. In 1215 the same pope compelled the rebuilding of Stroncone; Otricoli, after being captured and razed, and San Gemini were placed under direct Church control.

In 1216 the Roman noble Pietro Annibaldi, brother-in-law of Innocent III, was podestà of Narni. In 1242 the citizens, like those of Perugia, swore fidelity to the Roman people.

In 1241 Narni was besieged by Emperor Frederick II, but the municipality held out; it later faced further attacks by Rinaldo, the imperial Duke of Spoleto. During the 14th century Narni continued its push toward Stroncone and the forts of Carlea and Perticara, and it repeatedly went to war with Terni, with papal troops and papal legates intervening more than once. In 1353 the town was taken by Egidio Albornoz, and in 1367 he built a fortress there; from Narni he began the reorganisation of the Papal State. In 1371 the municipal statutes were renewed.

In 1373 Narni came under the Orsini. Pope Boniface IX passed through Narni on 17 October 1392 on his way to Perugia and stayed there again on his return the following year. In 1396 many rebels returned to obedience to the Church and were reconciled by order of the pope through the bishop of Narni, Bellanti, who also held the fortress and the city in fief.

In 1403 Narni was taken by King Ladislaus. In 1409 it was granted in vicariate to Bertoldo Orsini, though some attribute the grant to Paolo Orsini. Braccio da Montone occupied the city in 1419 and later restored it to Pope Martin V. In 1431 Narni received its first papal governor, Bartolo Carloni.

=== Early Modern era ===
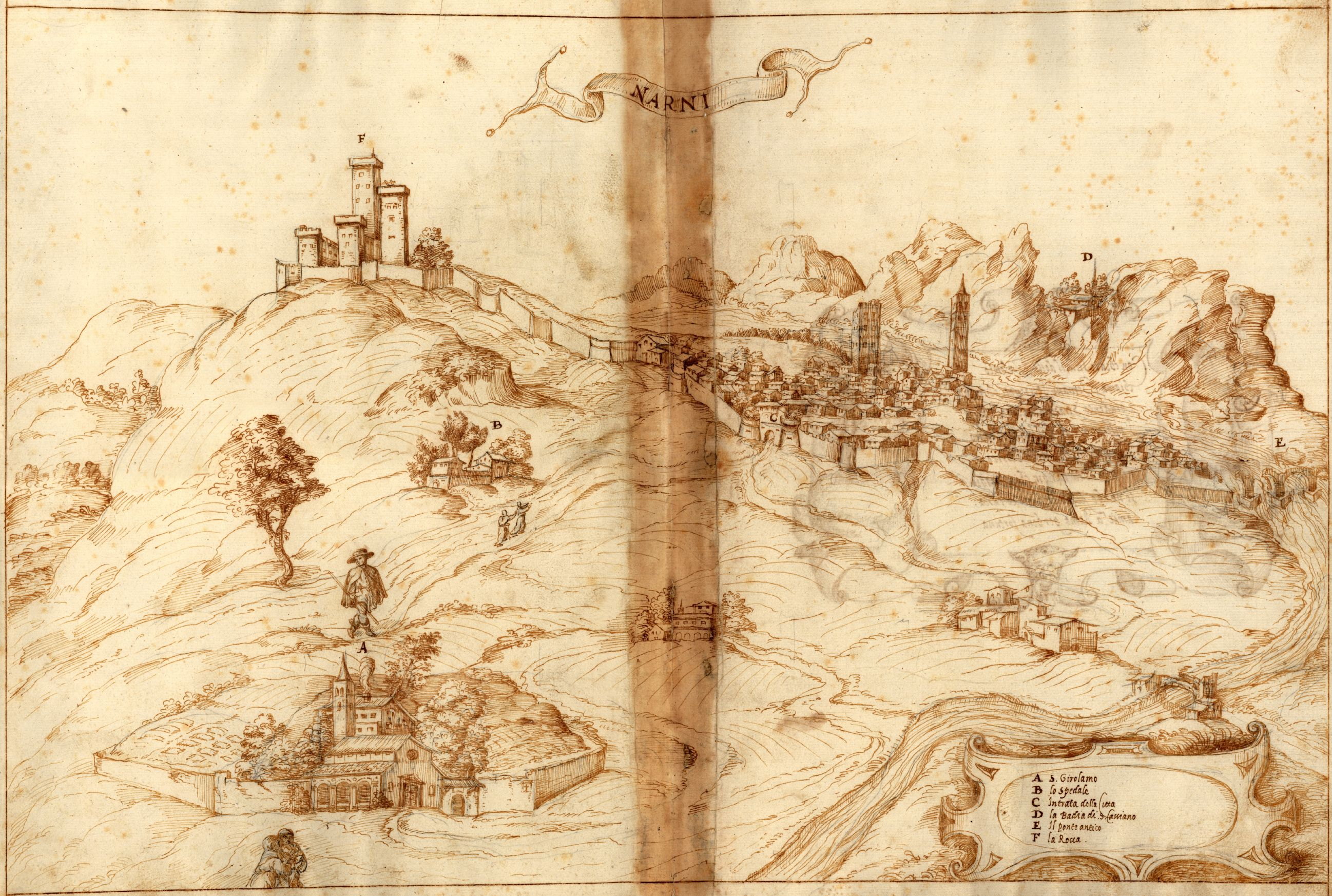
View of Narni, pen-and-ink drawing by Cipriano Piccolpasso, 1579

A major turning point in Narni's decline came in 1527, when returning Landsknechts after the Sack of Rome invaded. Narni resisted but was besieged and heavily looted, with Terni assisting in the siege. From that time Narni did not recover its former greatness. Around 1530 it was found largely deserted and in a state of desolation.

Recovery after 1527 was slow despite papal promises of aid and funding; Pope Paul III and Pope Pius IV confirmed tax breaks and privileges intended to support rebuilding of the walls and aqueducts. In 1560 further measures were granted, including tax exemptions and other relief for new settlers. In 1591 a plague outbreak further weakened the town.

In the 17th and 18th centuries the Narni area came under full Church control.

Pope Clement XI later promoted local industry by constructing an ironworks near the city for processing ore from nearby mines. In 1782 Pope Pius VI visited Narni on his journey to Vienna.

=== Contemporary period ===
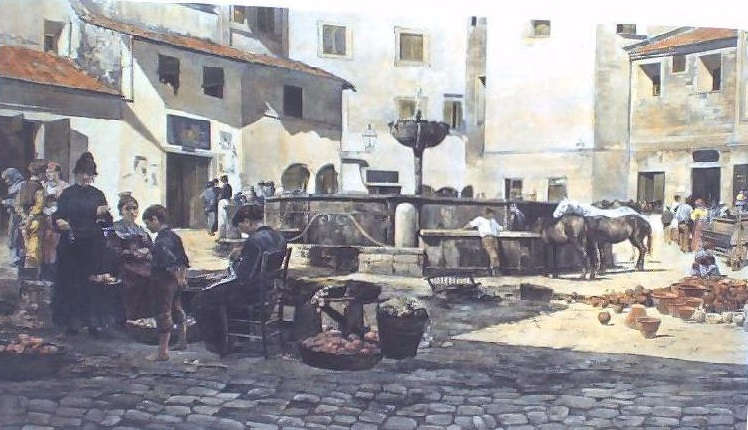
Piazza Garibaldi in Narni, painted by Francesco Raffaello Santoro in 1889

In the late 18th and early 19th centuries Narni experienced revolutionary upheavals, was placed under the Roman Republic, and was assigned under Spoleto as an administrative center before coming under the Napoleonic Empire.

Pope Pius VII was present in 1800 and again in May 1804 on his return from Paris. In 1809, during Napoleonic rule, the Narni canton was placed in the Rieti district.

After the Restoration, in 1824 Pope Leo XII added Narni to the Spoleto and Rieti Delegation in the Terni district. It became the seat of a governor, with Borgaria, Montoro, San Liberato, Stifone, and Taizzano attached to it.

In 1860 Narni formed a municipal committee of the Roman provinces linked to Florence to coordinate local patriots. On 21 September 1860 the papal insignia were taken down at the town hall. On 28 September 1860, after the Piedmontese army captured the fortress, the last papal stronghold.

== Geography ==
Narni stands on the left bank of the Nera, about 12 kilometres (7.5 mi) from its confluence with the Tiber. It rises 240 metres (790 ft) above sea level on a hill whose slopes descend toward the valley, the town itself standing 146 metres (479 ft) above the valley floor and near high mountains. The surrounding landscape includes wooded areas and the fertile Valnerina watered by the Nera.

The city rises on a rock and is surrounded by views of mountains. It overlooks the Terni valley, known as the Piano di Terni, near the historical boundary between Sabina and Umbria. It lies 9 miles (14 km) from Terni and 51 miles (82 km) from Rome.

The Via Flaminia passes through the city and, outside it, is cut into the living rock. The road was formerly very steep but has been made more gradual in more recent times.

The streets are somewhat narrow and steep, and some retain the character of the Middle Ages.

The surrounding territory is very fertile, especially in the valley irrigated by the waters of the Nera, producing cereals, wine, and fruit. The hills are covered with olive groves yielding excellent oil, and woodland products are also present. The climate is temperate, tending toward cold, with north and south winds prevailing.

=== Gole del Nera ===
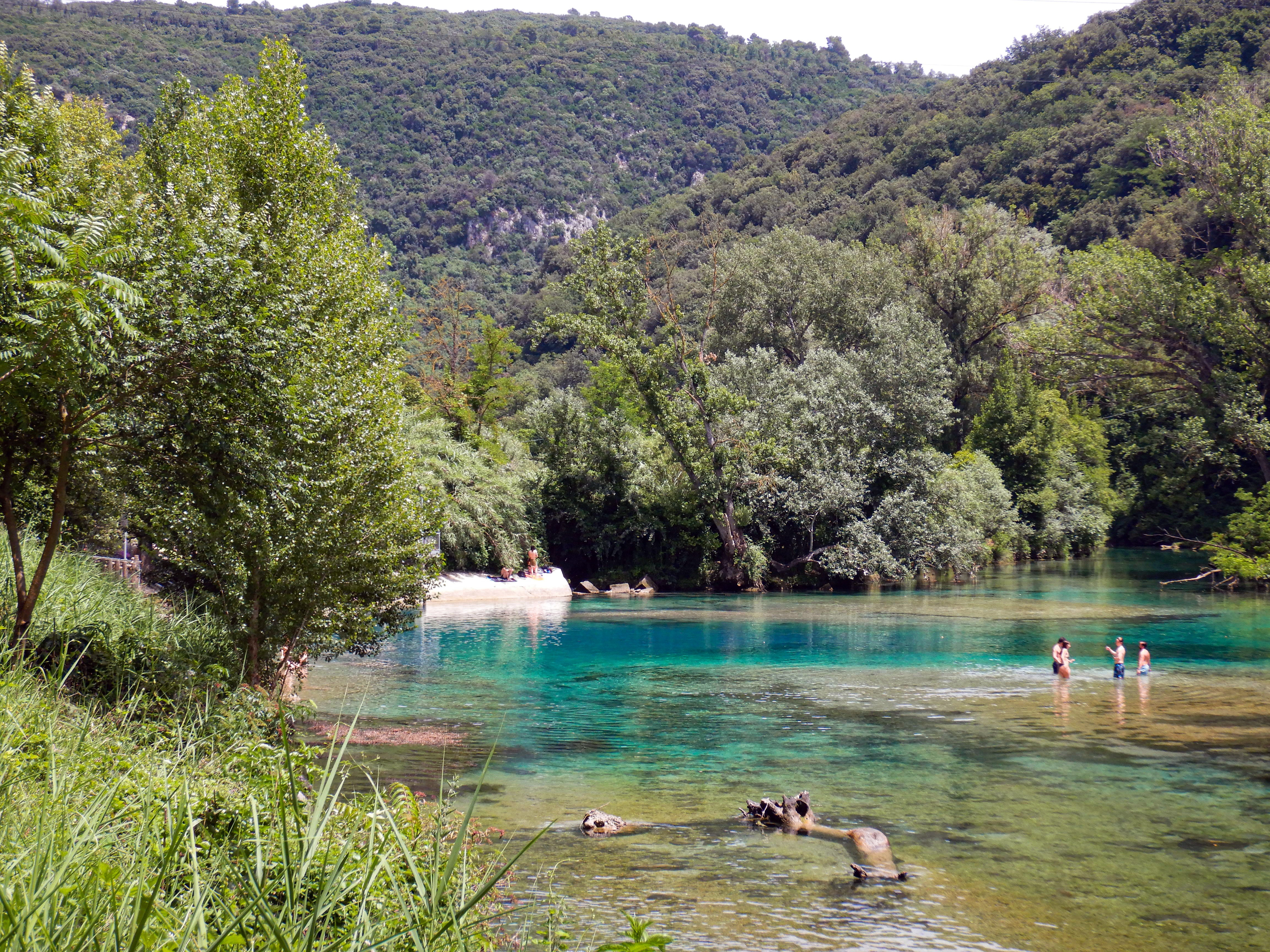
The Gole del Nera

The Gole del Nera form a part of the territory valued for its natural landscape. A path follows the former railway line along the Nera River for about 5 kilometres (3.1 mi) on the disused route. The itinerary is used for trekking, running, mountain biking, horseback riding, and canoeing, aided by artificial landings along the river from the area of Funara to Le Mole in the territory of Nera Montoro.

The area, upstream from the ecological oasis of Lago di San Liberato, is noted especially for birdlife. Its rocky walls host a resident population of blue rock thrush and provide refuge for nocturnal and diurnal birds of prey. Woods of holm oak and manna ash also shelter many migratory species, including wood pigeons, thrushes, blackbirds, jays, and other passerines.

The former railway through the Gole del Nera has been reused as a route for outdoor activities along the river and through a landscape that also preserves Roman and medieval remains.

=== Subdivisions ===
The municipality includes the localities of Altrocanto, Borgaria, Capitone, Castelchiaro, Castello, Castelvecchio, Cipiccia Vecchia, Colle di Sopra, Colle Palazzo, Erbapigia, Fabbrucciano, Fiaiola, Guadamello, Gualdo, Itieli, La Cerquetta, Madonna delle Treie, Madonna Scoperta, Mallione, Maratta, Massa, Miriano, Montini, Montoro, Moricone, Narni, Narni Scalo, Nera Montoro, Ponte San Lorenzo, San Faustino, San Liberato, San Mauro, San Pellegrino, San Vito, Sant'Urbano, Schifanoia, Stifone, Taizzano, Testaccio, Vigne, Visciano.

In 2021, 3,921 people lived in rural dispersed dwellings not assigned to any named locality. At the time, the most populous localities was Narni Scalo (4,672), followed by Narni proper (4,505). The following localities had no recorded permanent residents: Convento Lo Speco.

== Economy ==
In the 19th century the territory reportedly produced cereals, wine, fruit, olive oil, and woodland resources. There was an abundant quarry of pozzolana, and ironworks established under Pope Clement XI were present.

Near the course of the Nera, at a short distance from the railway station, industrial establishments had developed in the late 19th century, including those of the Società Anonima for leather tanning and the factory of Pirelli for the processing of caoutchouc and rubber.

By the 1890s the city and these establishments were illuminated by electric light. The first generating station was at Stifone, about 3 kilometres (1.9 mi) from the city, initially supplying around 700 lamps of varying intensity from a single machine. This proved insufficient, and an additional dynamo was installed, increasing the number of lamps in the city and surrounding areas to about 1,200, with intensities ranging from 10 to 32 candelas.

The city included a printing house founded by Giovan Battista di Crollalanza, known as the Tipografia di Gattamelata.

The mineral waters of Narni were renowned in antiquity and are mentioned by Pliny, Priscian, and other writers.

In the 1940s Narni was an important industrial center, particularly in electrochemical production. The synthetic ammonia plant of the Società Terni at Narni had an approximate annual capacity of 15,000 tons in terms of nitrogen, while another plant at Narni had a capacity of 4,000 tons nitrogen. Carbon electrodes of all types were manufactured at Narni by the Società Italiana dei Forni Elettrici, a subsidiary of Siemens Planiawerke, with an annual capacity of approximately 10–12,000 tons.

== Religion ==
=== Cathedral ===
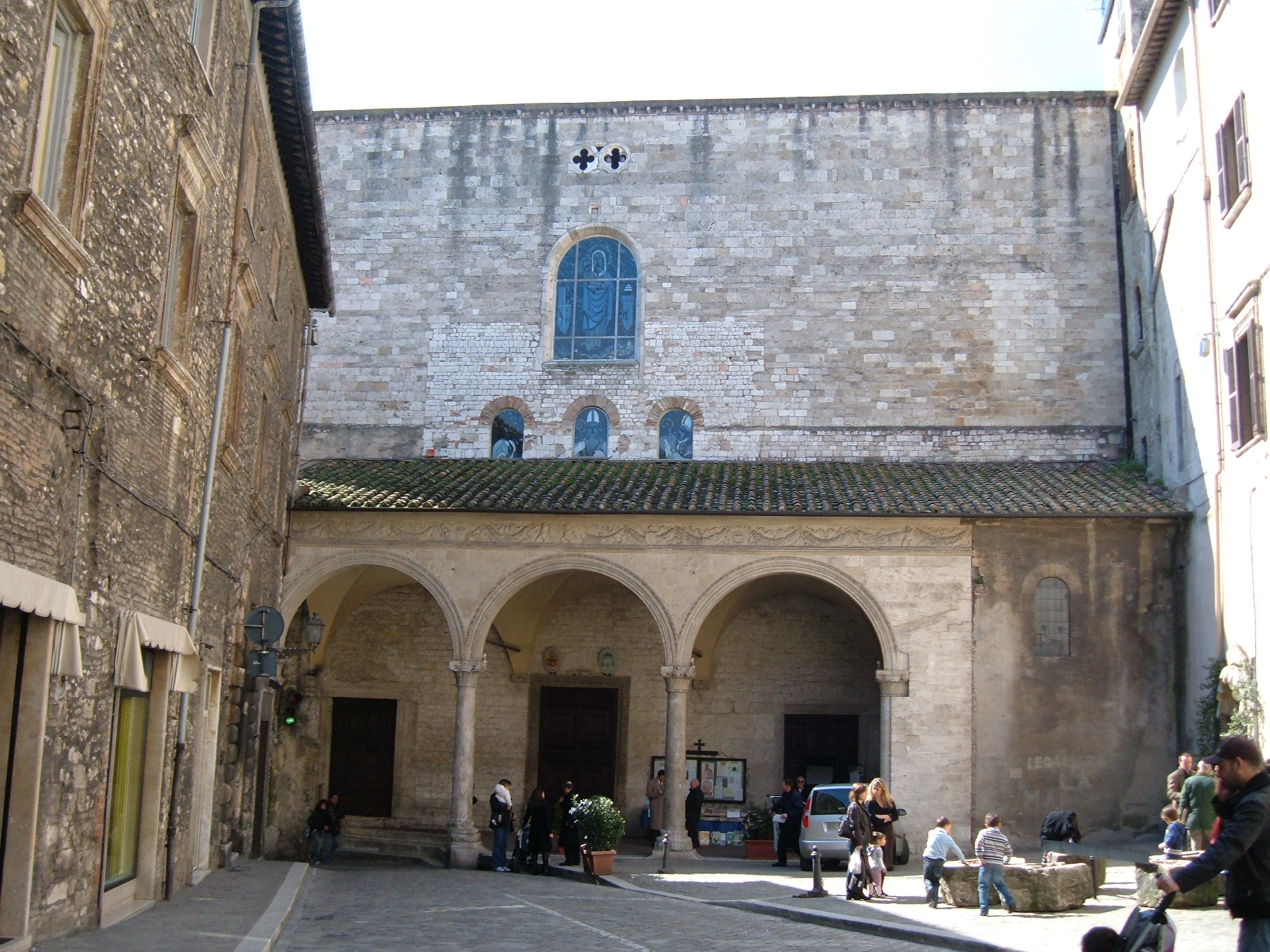
The cathedral of San Giovenale

The cathedral has two façades dating to the 15th century, one facing the main square and the other the upper square. The latter is decorated with a portico of three arches, beneath which, on the right, stands a chapel of refined architecture built in 1497 by Lombard masons. The cathedral is dedicated to Saint Juvenal of Narni, first bishop of Narni.

Three entrances lead into the basilica: the two lateral portals are adorned with frames of Roman date, while the central portal was executed in the 14th century. Above the door is a long inscription referring to the year 1123.

The interior is divided into four naves, three corresponding to the entrances and a fourth joining them on the right. In the lateral naves, supported by sixteen columns, and in two pillars of the presbytery, the style of the 9th century is visible. The capitals are varied and described as being of a primitive, rough workmanship. In the 15th century the church was completely restored, its elevation increased and ribless cross vaults added. The polygonal apse appears to have been constructed in the 14th century.

In the left nave, at the second altar, there is an oil painting depicting Christ handing the keys to Saint Peter, signed by Livio Agresti and dated 1560. On the wall stands the funerary monument of Pietro Cesi, senator of Rome, executed in 1477; above the sarcophagus is a fresco of the Virgin with Jesus from the school of Foligno.

The chapel of Bishop Gormaz has an entrance entirely in stone, and the altar is decorated with an elegant sculpture in white marble with a central niche containing an image of the Virgin with Jesus painted on panel in imitation of Byzantine icons. On the right wall is the tomb of Gormaz, represented lying upon the sarcophagus; this tomb was constructed in 1514, and the sculptures set into the facing wall belong to the same monument.

The left ambon has a marble pulpit with bas-reliefs, a highly esteemed work of the 15th century. The left chapel of the transept contains three oil paintings dating to the late 17th century, the best representing the Nativity of Christ.

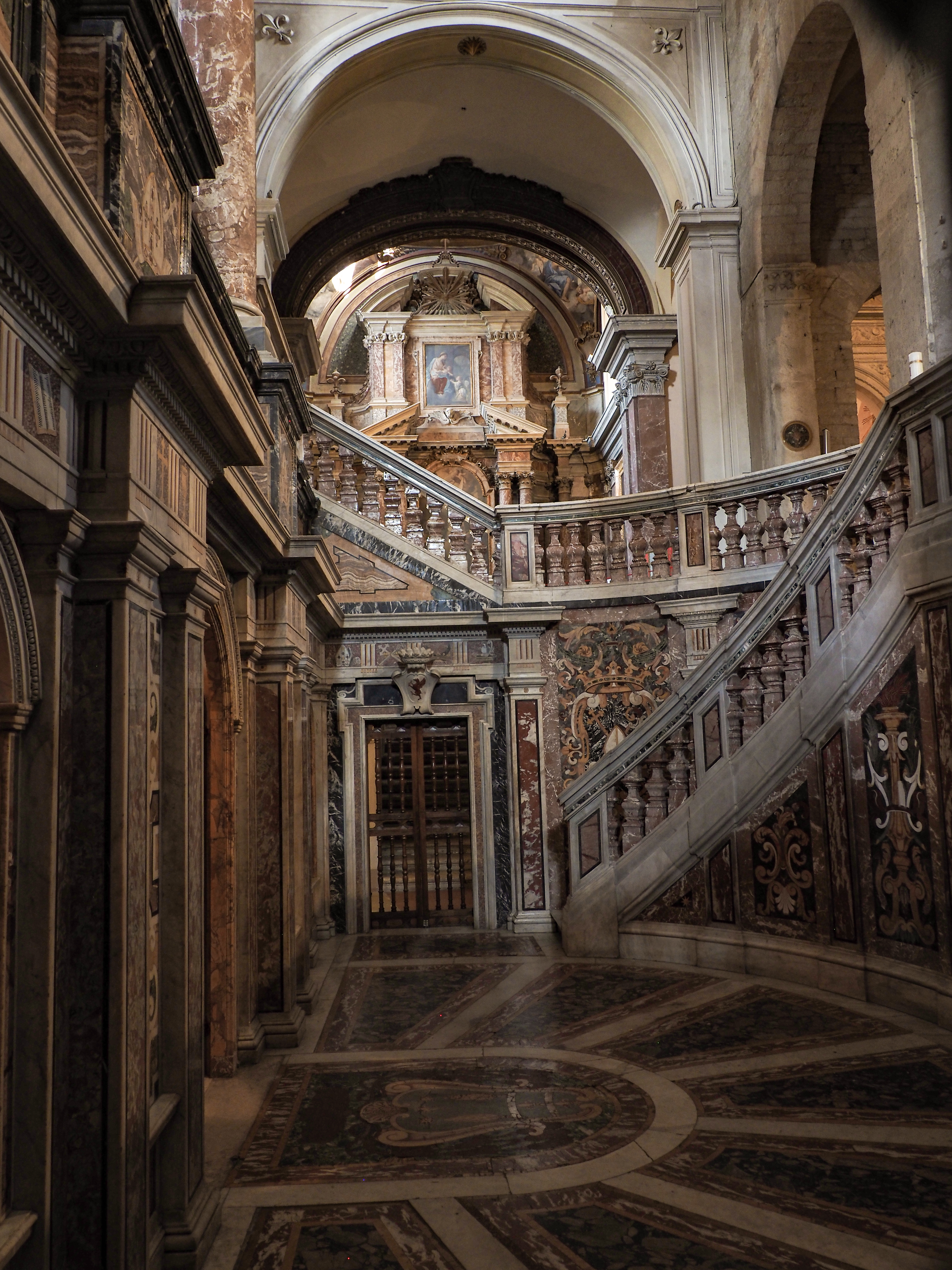
Monumental double staircase leading down to the crypt, richly inlaid marble surfaces

The crypt is reached by a richly designed staircase modeled on that of Saint Peter's in the Vatican. The tribune likewise imitates that of Saint Peter's in Rome. The apse is covered by eight sections with recessed painted decoration. The choir is richly carved and inlaid in wood and was executed in the 15th century.

In the first nave on the right, the ambon resembles the one already described, with variations in the sculptures of the stalls. The pulpit bears bas-reliefs of Saint Peter, Saint Paul, and Saint John the Baptist and carries the inscription 1490.

In the second nave on the right, the chapel beyond the presbytery is adorned with paintings of the 15th and 16th centuries. The chapel of the right transept contains an oil painting representing Blessed Lucia of Narni receiving the stigmata, a work by Trevisani; on the left wall is another painting by the same artist depicting the death of Saint Joseph.

In the first pillar of the second nave is a remnant of a tempera panel from the school of Foligno representing Saint Juvenal in the act of blessing. The first chapel has an entrance of fine architectural form, masterfully sculpted in the 15th century, and contains a wooden crucifix of the same century.

The tomb of Saint Cassius externally presents four orders of marble seats divided by cornices and pilasters, with the upper line decorated with mosaic and an inscription with rough sculptures. On the left side is a niche containing a small statue of a seated bishop saint from the 14th century. Internally, the tomb consists of a Roman hypogeum chamber; on the altar is a reassembled marble triptych, apparently of the 15th century.

The second chapel extends across both right naves and penetrates into the wall. In the first nave there is a grand triumphal arch repeated in the second nave. These decorations are regarded as masterpieces of the Renaissance. The perspective concludes with a final chamber executed with equal mastery, whose sculptures indicate dedication to the Most Holy Sacrament. These works were executed around the mid-15th century. At the center stands a wooden statue of Saint Anthony Abbot, bearing the inscription Lorenzo di Pietro, 1475.

In the third chapel, the altar preserves remains of 16th-century sculpture. On the left wall is a tomb executed in 1498 which contained the remains of Bishop Carlo Buccardio. At the head of the second nave is a marble baptismal font bearing the inscription 1506.

The building contains a subterranean confession adorned with marbles, where the bodies of Saint Juvenal and Saint Cassius are preserved along with other relics.

=== Santa Maria Impensole ===
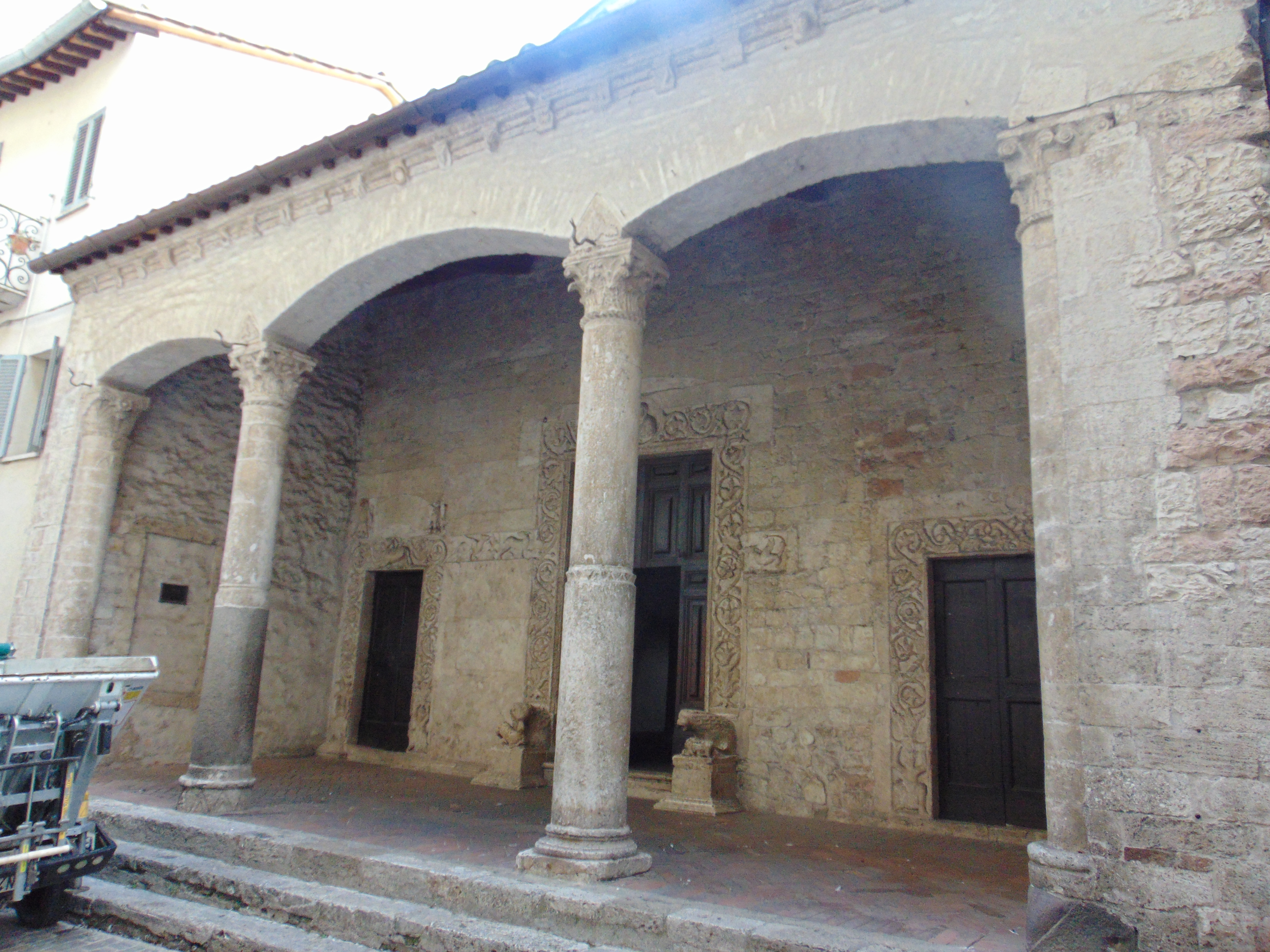
Portico of Santa Maria Impensole, with a series of stone columns supporting round arches

The Church of Santa Maria Impensole was built on the remains of an earlier structure dated to the 8th century, of which it retained the supporting framework. The date of construction or reconstruction is 1175, as recorded on the architrave of the central door.

The church was constructed over the ruins of a Roman building of the late imperial period, believed by some to have been a temple of Bacchus. The name Impensole derives from in pensile, referring to the sloping ground on which it was built.

Externally it has an atrium with three openings corresponding to the three entrance doors, divided by four travertine columns, two freestanding and two incorporated into the side piers. The capitals are Corinthian; three have acanthus leaves and tendrils, while the one on the left has flowering rose branches. The portals are ornamented with floral friezes, tendrils, and symbolic animal figures including the lamb, lion, eagle, and peacock. Above the central portal is a sculpted medallion figure identified by some as the Redeemer and by others as a symbolic figure, possibly Saint Benedict; beside the portal are two stone lions. Over the left entrance are two imperial eagles above the Lamb of the Apocalypse.

The church has a Latin cross plan with three naves divided by two rows of four columns and two piers supporting the triumphal arch. The capitals are Corinthian except for the third on the right, which has two human figures each entwined by two lions and may belong to the church’s earlier 8th-century phase or be of barbarian origin. The projecting apse is small. In front of it is the single rectangular stone altar, with a large marble altar supported by six small piers decorated in Cosmatesque style and joined by stone panels, two of which have quatrefoil openings through which relics can be seen. The church contains a 17th-century wooden statue of the Assumption placed on a bracket at the center of the apse, and traces of local paintings from the 14th and 15th centuries remain on the walls. Popular assemblies and meetings of guilds were often held there.

The sacristy is notable for being entirely decorated with frescoes on the vault and walls, later covered with whitewash. Partial uncovering reveals scenes including the Epiphany, the Flight into Egypt, the Fall of manna, Saints Peter and Paul, and the Nativity, attributed to the school of the Zuccari.

==== Underground rooms ====
The underground rooms of Santa Maria Impensole are entered by descending steps to the left outside the church. They consist of three spaces: an entrance chamber, a small adjoining room reached through a narrow passage, and a larger three-aisled area divided by piers. The entrance chamber is rectangular and vaulted, with three niches in the right wall; the central niche is surmounted by the projecting apse above, and this chamber lies below the presbytery. On the left side, where the masonry is irregular and made with reused material, is the access to the underground area beneath the church naves.

The piers, five on each side and linked to the walls by arches, are finished in the pink and white stone used in Narni buildings and quarried from Monte Ippolito near Narni. These piers stand on older supports. On the right is an arcosolium tomb dated to the 6th century, and there are remains of Roman herringbone masonry that may be of the same period. At the back on the left is a well on which the foundations of the façade wall of the upper church rest.

Returning to the entrance chamber, a small opening at the back left leads to another small room, where a window gives a view of an original well built directly beneath the church's load-bearing wall. It is supported by a pier made of a monolithic cubic block and part of a cylindrical column, with a rustic capital and architrave. A stone vault covers the shaft, which is considered a Roman cistern with its original plaster. The well seen through the window is about 8 metres (26 ft) deep, about 5 metres (16 ft) in diameter, and contains water to a depth of about 2.5 metres (8 ft 2 in). Other traces of arches suggest additional connected spaces, some still accessible and others filled with rubble, identified as remains of an ancient Benedictine monastery.

=== Sant'Agostino ===
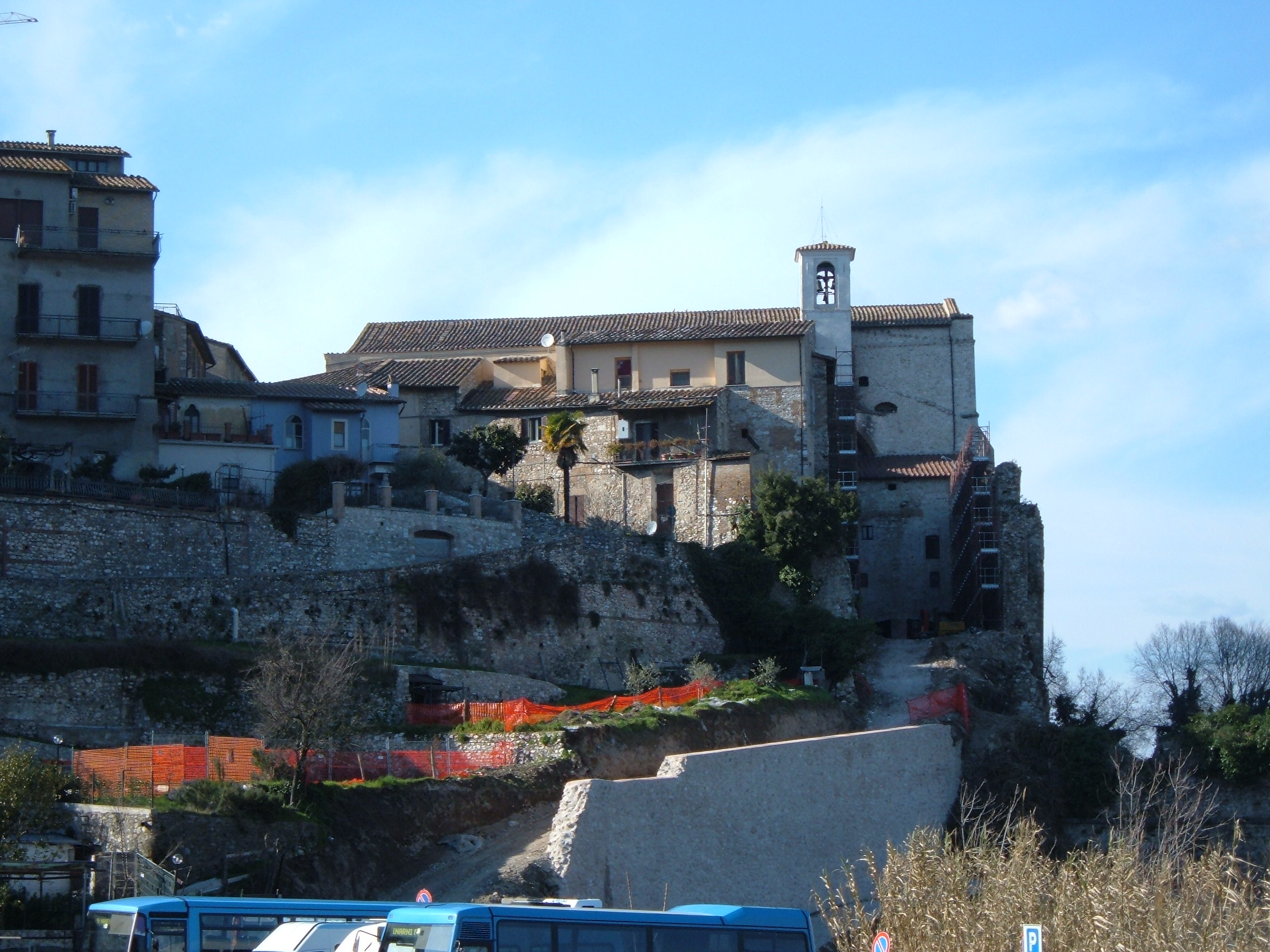
Church of Sant'Agostino

The church of Sant'Agostino was erected in the 15th century. The exterior is decorated with three niches containing frescoes of the school of Foligno. One niche contains a fresco of the Virgin with the Child.

Inside, on the left wall of the entrance, are figures of Saint Lucy and Saint Apollonia with a landscape behind them. The lateral walls display two candelabra with panels, works of the Umbrian school of the 15th century.

In the chapel of the left nave are frescoes depicting Saint Blaise and Saint Nicholas of Tolentino. On the corresponding second wall is Saint Augustine in dialogue with the Child. On the first wall to the right near the altar is Saint Sebastian with three companions being led to martyrdom, a work by Lorenzo da Verona of the 16th century.

At the second altar of the left nave is an oil painting representing the Madonna of the Belt, a work of the second half of the 17th century, possibly by a Flemish artist. In the apse is a painting by Alfani representing Mary in glory with Jesus and saints.

In the right nave, at the fourth altar, a tempera panel depicts Christ on the cross with Saint Andrew, Saint Augustine, Saint Monica, and Saint Nicholas. The predella shows the martyrdom of Saint Andrew, the Flagellation of Jesus, the journey to Calvary, the baptism of Saint Augustine, and Saint Monica praying, a work of the school of Foligno from around the mid-15th century.

=== San Domenico ===
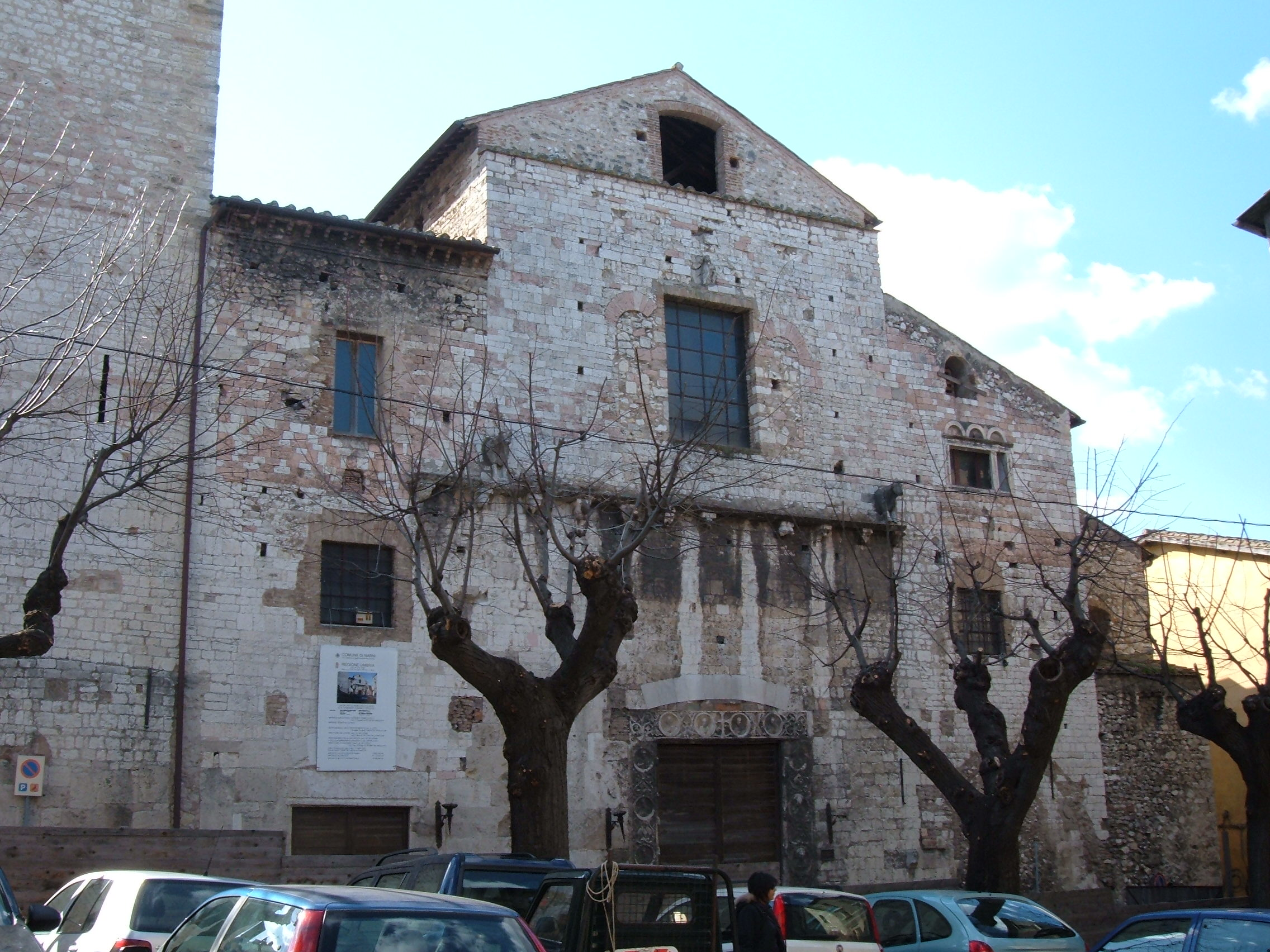
The Church of San Domenico, with a simple stone façade marked by irregular masonry

The Church of San Domenico stands on the site where tradition places an ancient temple dedicated to Minerva. Built in the 12th century, it was originally the city's ancient cathedral dedicated to Santa Maria Assunta. It took the name San Domenico in 1304, when it was assigned by papal bull to the friars of that order.

The gabled façade has been altered several times. Romanesque elements include the entrance portal with a marble frame decorated in low relief with vegetal scrolls enclosing roundels with busts of the apostles, and corbels with human and animal protomes. The large window opening dates to the 13th century and replaced a triple-light window decorated with mosaic, traces of which remain visible above the portal.

The interior is divided into three naves by piers, with side chapels. The walls preserve frescoes dating from the 13th to the late 16th century. On the second pier to the right is a Crucifixion attributed to the Master of the Dormitio, who is also associated with nearby saint figures. At the end of the left nave is a fresco of the Madonna with Saints Dominic and Thomas from the school of Pier Matteo d'Amelia, dating to the late 15th century. A Renaissance marble tabernacle from the school of Agostino di Duccio, formerly attached to the pier of the triumphal arch, was later transferred to the civic picture gallery.

On the left, the large Chapel of the Rosary, frescoed in the second half of the 15th century by Flemish artists with scenes from Genesis, houses Upper Pleistocene paleontological materials and archaeological finds from the territory. The lunette contains the Annunciation, attributed to Federico Zuccari and dated 1570. The entrance to the second chapel was designed toward the end of the 15th century. On the left wall is a tempera panel representing the Annunciation, attributed to Mezzasti. In the sacristy are remains of a tempera triptych painted on both sides, showing the Virgin enthroned and her Coronation, a work of the Sienese school of the 15th century.

In the underground level there is also an early Romanesque single-nave chapel preserving traces of frescoes datable between the 12th and 14th centuries. In the left and right naves, at the third arch, are remains of the ancient mosaic pavement known as Alexandrian.

=== San Girolamo ===
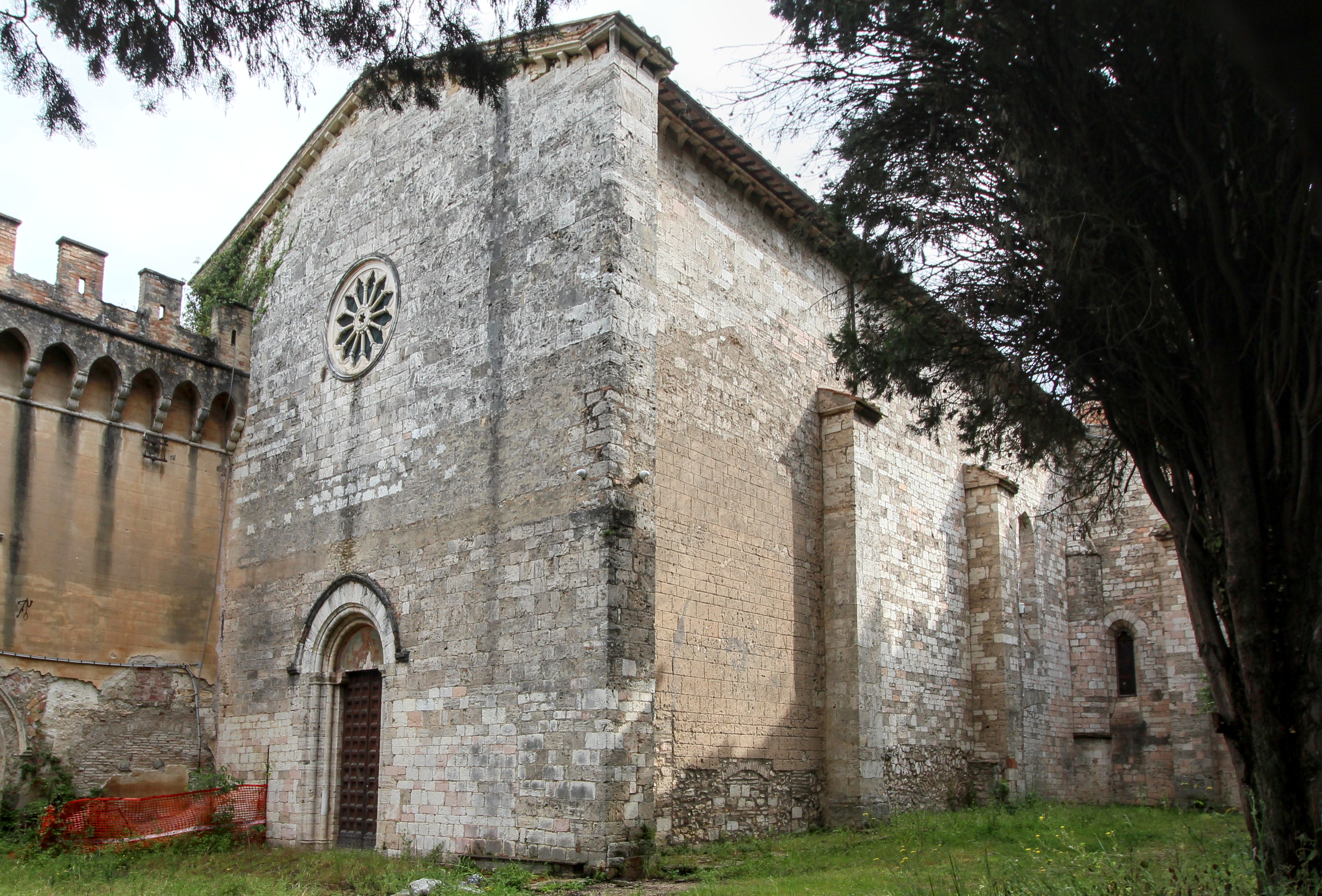
Church of San Girolamo, with a simple stone façade articulated by a rose window

The construction dates to the 14th century. The façade has a portico, and the architectural band of the arch of the doorway is decorated with colored ornaments. The lunette contains a fresco of the Virgin with Jesus, Saint Francis, and Saint Dominic, attributed to Mezzasti.

In the atrium is a chapel with a fresco of 1528 depicting Saint Francis receiving the stigmata, from the Perugian school. The interior retains its original architectural character, consisting of a single nave with a cross vault in the form of a Latin cross.

On the left wall, at the first altar, is a tempera panel representing Saint Anthony, by a pupil of Lo Spagna. On the left pier is Blessed Bernardino of Feltre, also in tempera, from the same school. On the right pier is a tempera panel representing Blessed Lattanzio, from the school of Foligno of the 16th century.

The apse formerly contained a notable tempera panel with an architectural frame, attributed to Filippo Lippi but later considered the work of Ghirlandaio; the painting is now kept in a hall of the municipal palace.

=== Santa Margherita ===
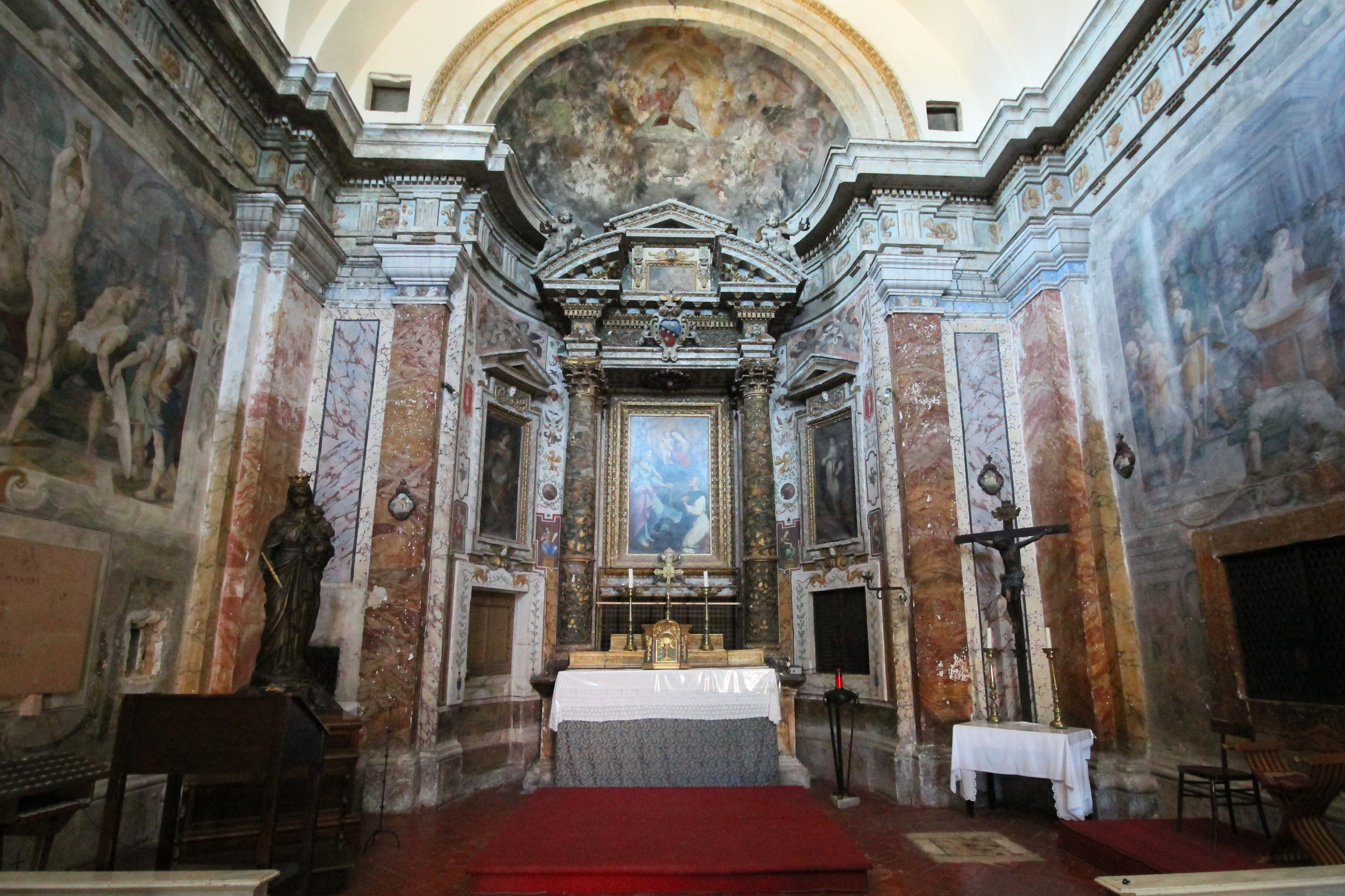
Interior of Santa Margherita, with a Baroque altar framed by marble columns and frescoed walls

The church of Santa Margherita was established together with the attached Benedictine nuns' monastery, now suppressed, and was completed in 1602, as recorded by inscriptions on the vault. The late 16th-century façade is divided into two parts. It has travertine portals with festoons and other stucco ornament above them, two windows in the upper section, and an oval opening above. A pediment completes the façade.

The interior has Baroque features. The vault is decorated with stuccoes, the central and largest of which represents Saint Margaret. On the walls are scenes from the saint's life, including her capture, flagellation, trial with boiling oil, and decapitation, attributed to the Zuccari, possibly Federico. Around the side altars are other frescoes with images of saints, while the small apse is decorated with grotesque ornament.

This small single-nave church is decorated with frescoes on the walls depicting scenes from the life of Saint Margaret. These include her meeting with Olibio, prefect of Asia, her condemnation, her martyrdom in boiling water, and her decapitation. The painter follows the manner of Domenichino.

=== Santa Maria delle Grazie ===
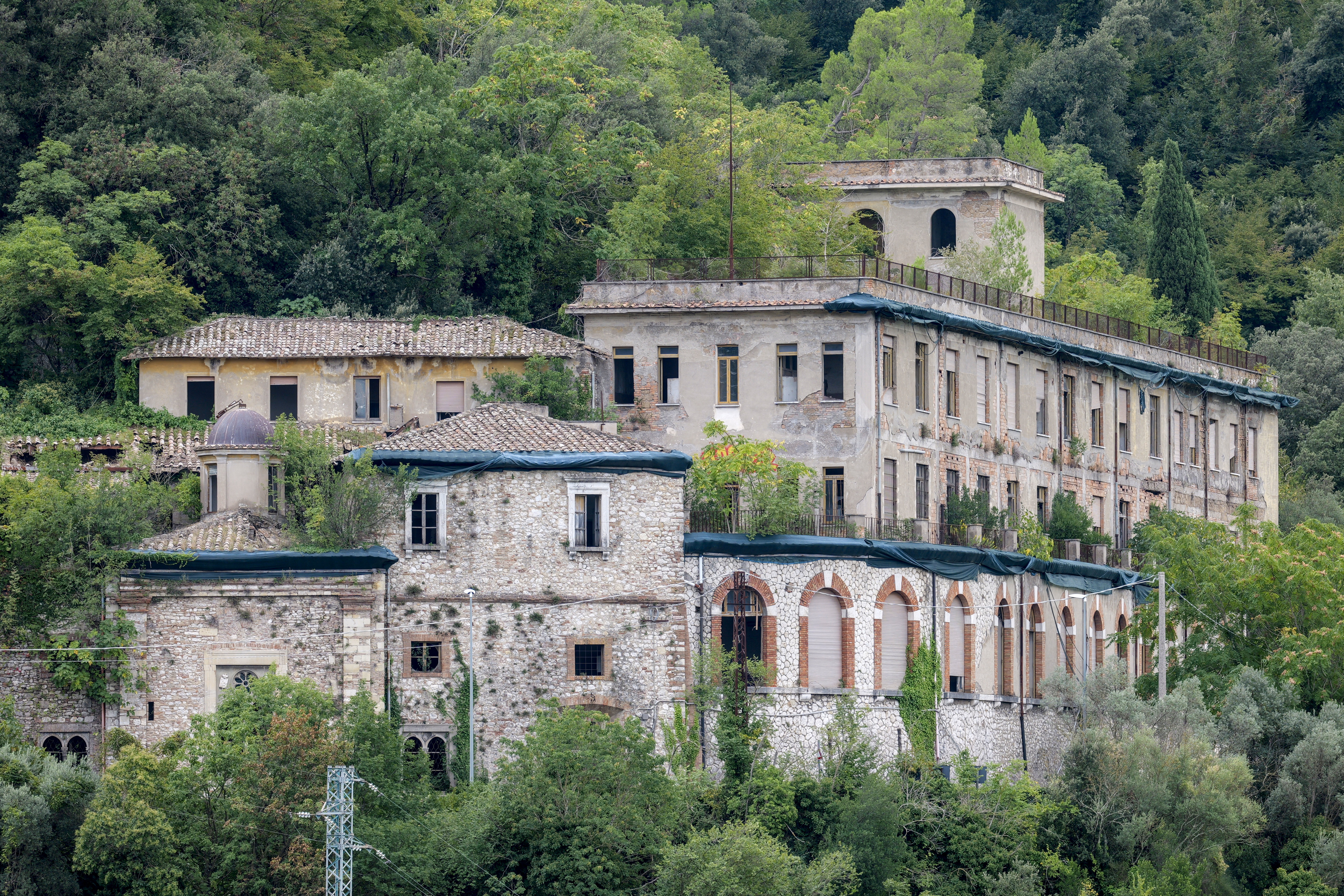
Former convent and church Santa Maria delle Grazie

The church of Santa Maria delle Grazie preserves only the right portion of the altar front, with a tympanum sculpted with the Announcing Angel on the right, the Virgin, and the Holy Spirit on the left, a work of the 16th century.

The church has a portico of three flat arches in the Byzantine manner, and the three entrance doors are sculpted in the same style. The upper façade originally had a circular window. The sculptures are significant for the study of early Christian art.

The interior has three naves supported by ten arcades corresponding to eight chapels. The capitals are notable, especially that of the fourth in the right nave. The high altar retains its original form and is entirely covered in marble, a work of the 15th century.

=== Hermitage of San Francesco ===
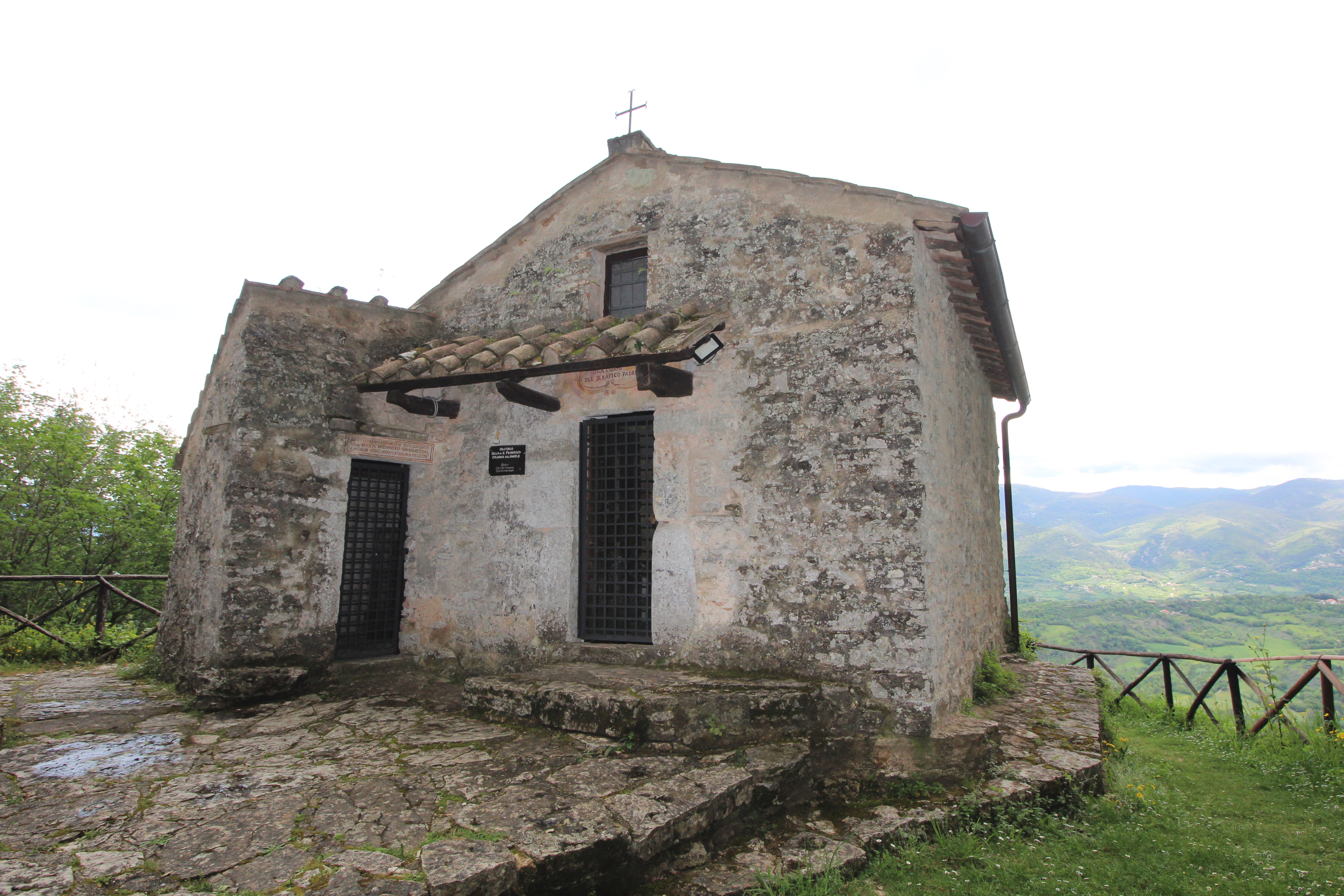
Oratory at the Hermitage of San Francesco

The Eremo Sacro Speco di San Francesco stands in a wooded setting overlooking the valley and is the oldest Franciscan site in the Valnerina. Francis of Assisi reached it in 1213. According to tradition, he heard the sound of the angel's viol and turned water into wine there. He often withdrew in solitude to the small church and to a fissure in the rock higher up in the woods. He also spent a period of illness there, during which the friars built for him, beside the cave, a small stone cell with a wooden bed.

The small cloister dates to the 15th century, when Bernardino of Siena had the dormitory built, with windows facing onto the central part of the building, together with the refectory. In the cloister is the chapel of San Silvestro, brought to light by restoration and containing 14th-century frescoes. From there a narrow corridor leads to the room containing the well mentioned in the Fioretti and by Thomas of Celano, from which the water later turned into wine was drawn.

The convent church dates from the late 16th century and preserves, in the chapel, an inlaid mother-of-pearl cross made by a Franciscan friar and a 15th-century chalice noted for its material. Above is the cell of Francis of Assisi, where the bed, made of four disconnected wooden pieces, is preserved. Nearby is a chapel with wall paintings depicting episodes associated with the site, and to the left on leaving is the large fissure in the rock.

=== Abbey of San Cassiano ===
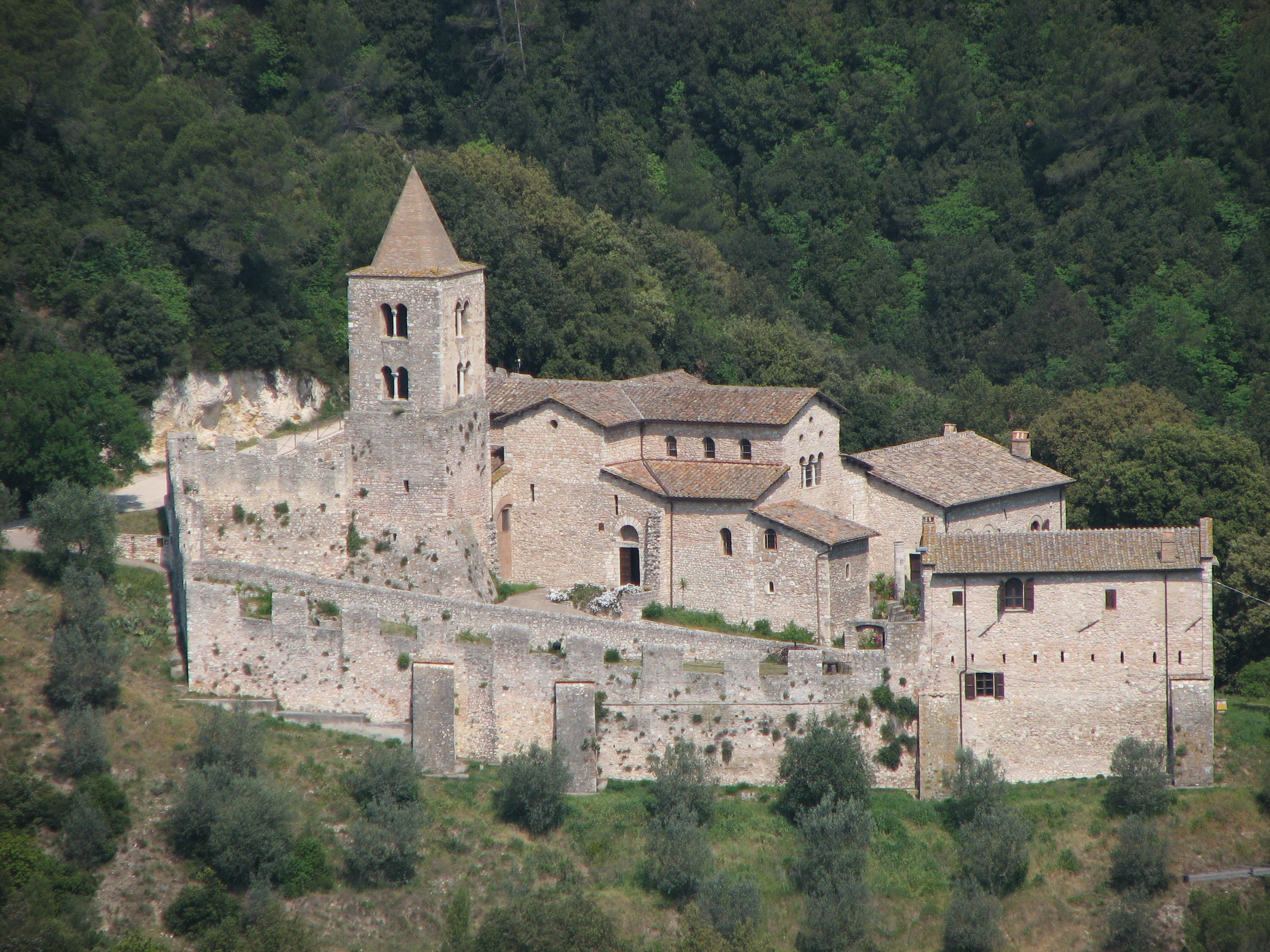
The Abbey of San Cassiano

The Abbey of San Cassiano stands near Narni on the slopes of Monte di Santa Croce. Founded by Benedictine monks, the monastery is first mentioned in the Chronicon farfense of Gregory of Catino.

The church has a Greek-cross plan. Its interior is divided into three aisles by round arches resting on columns, which become cruciform piers at the crossing. The roof has wooden trusses reproducing the original covering. The façade rises above a high staircase and has a four-pitched profile, a splayed round-arched portal with a frescoed lunette, and a large ring molding in local stone. In the upper part of the façade there is a triple-light window with small columns and three small oculi. The floor originally consisted of mosaics and marble slabs taken from Roman monuments. An inscription dated 1490 appears beneath a damaged marble relief.

The square bell tower was rebuilt over an earlier tower beside the church. Around the church extends the monastic complex, partly enclosed by walls probably dating to the 15th century.

The date 1334 is visible on the monastery walls and marks works that included the construction of the portal, the monastery, and the bell tower. The abbey retained significance through the 14th century until 1532, when it was granted in commendam. Neglect by the commendatory holders led to its decline and to the departure of the monks. In 1849 it was sold to private owners. Restoration in the 1970s brought to light the original Greek-cross plan, which had been altered in the 14th century into a basilical three-aisled layout. The complex is now again a residence of Benedictine monks.

=== Sant'Antonio ===
The church of Sant'Antonio is divided into three naves with ten arcades corresponding to eight chapels. In the first chapel on the left wall is an oil painting depicting Jesus in the house of Martha and Mary, dated 1608. In the second chapel is another painting by the same artist showing Saint Francis receiving the stigmata.

The high altar contains a notable oil painting recalling the manner of Gherardo da Rieti, representing Mary and Jesus surrounded by angels, with Saint Bonaventure, Saint Francis, Saint Anthony, and Saint Juvenal below.

=== Madonna della Quercia ===
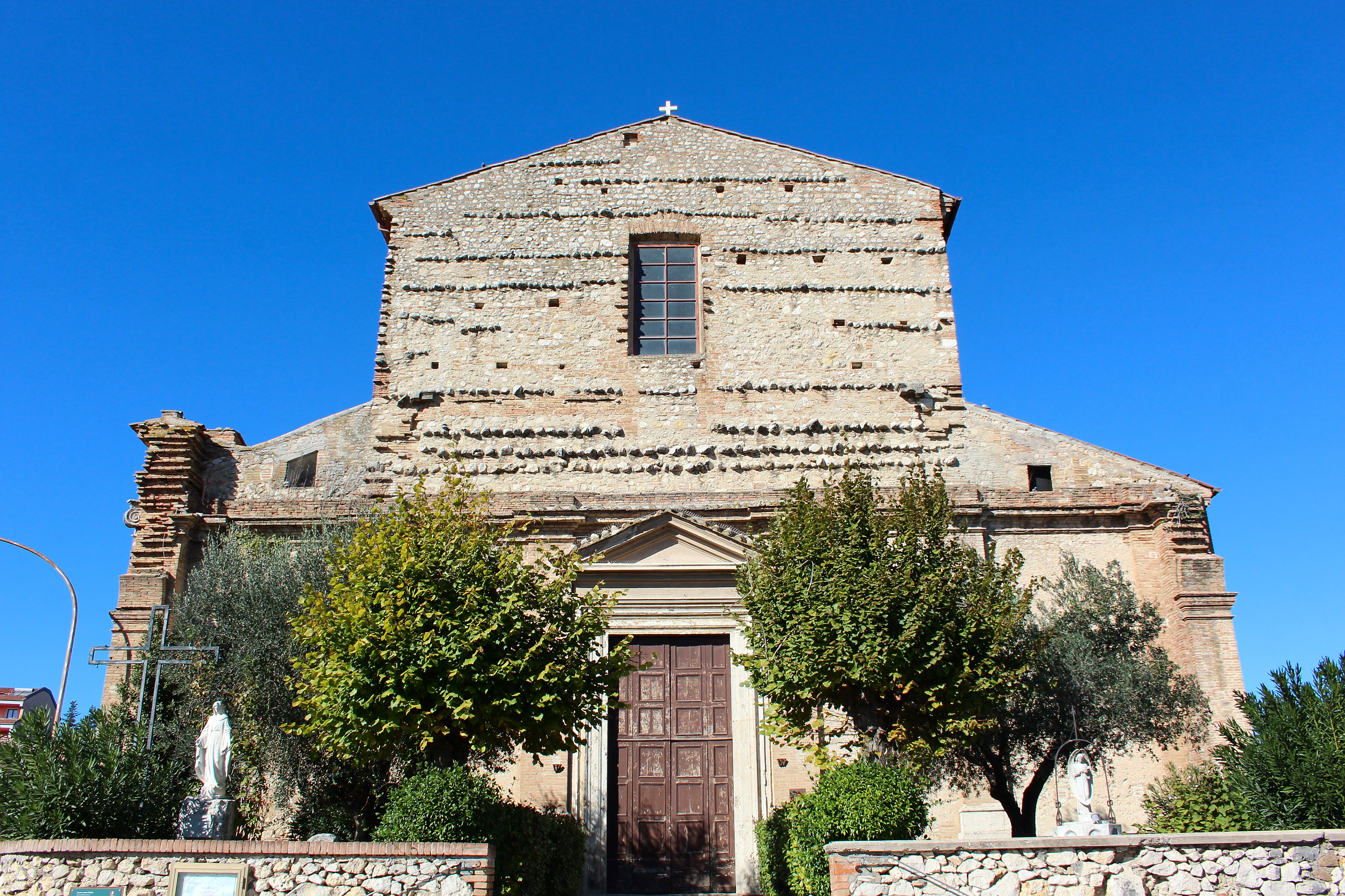
The church of Madonna della Quercia

The church of Madonna della Quercia lies about 3 kilometres (1.9 mi) north of Narni. It contains paintings including a Virgin with saints from the 18th century, a Madonna of the Snow, a work by Alfani with Mary, Saint Anne, and Jesus, and a large composition depicting Christ with Mary Magdalene, Martha, Veronica, Saint John, and Saint Peter, with the tomb of Christ and a view of Jerusalem, signed by Baccius.

=== Other religious buildings ===
The church of Santa Restituta has a high altar richly decorated in marble and adorned with two columns of green antique marble. At the center is a painting representing the Visitation of Saint Elizabeth, a work of the Neapolitan school of the 17th century.

The church of San Francesco has a façade, rectangular in form, originally with two small square windows surmounted by semicircles at the sides, and a circular window at the center. The entrance is of fine architectural design and richly ornamented. The upper part of the door preserves the original shutters, notable for their decoration. The construction of the church dates to the 14th century.

The church of San Bernardo is adorned with four oil paintings depicting scenes from the life of Saint Benedict, executed by artists of the Roman school in the 17th century. It contains at its center a finely designed wooden chandelier, gilded and painted, a work of the 16th century.

The church of Sant'Alò preserves, on the principal wall of its interior, remains of a large 14th-century fresco.

The church of San Bernardino contains, within a niche on the altar wall, a wooden statue of Saint Bernardino, a work signed by Lorenzo di Pietro.

The church of Madonna del Ponte stands near the right bank of the Nera. At its center is a fragment of a funerary monument aligned with the ancient road leading from the Roman bridge toward the plain.

The monastery of San Benedetto, titled Sant'Andrea della Valle, was occupied by the Order of Saint Augustine since 1215.

== Culture ==
=== Rocca Albornoziana ===
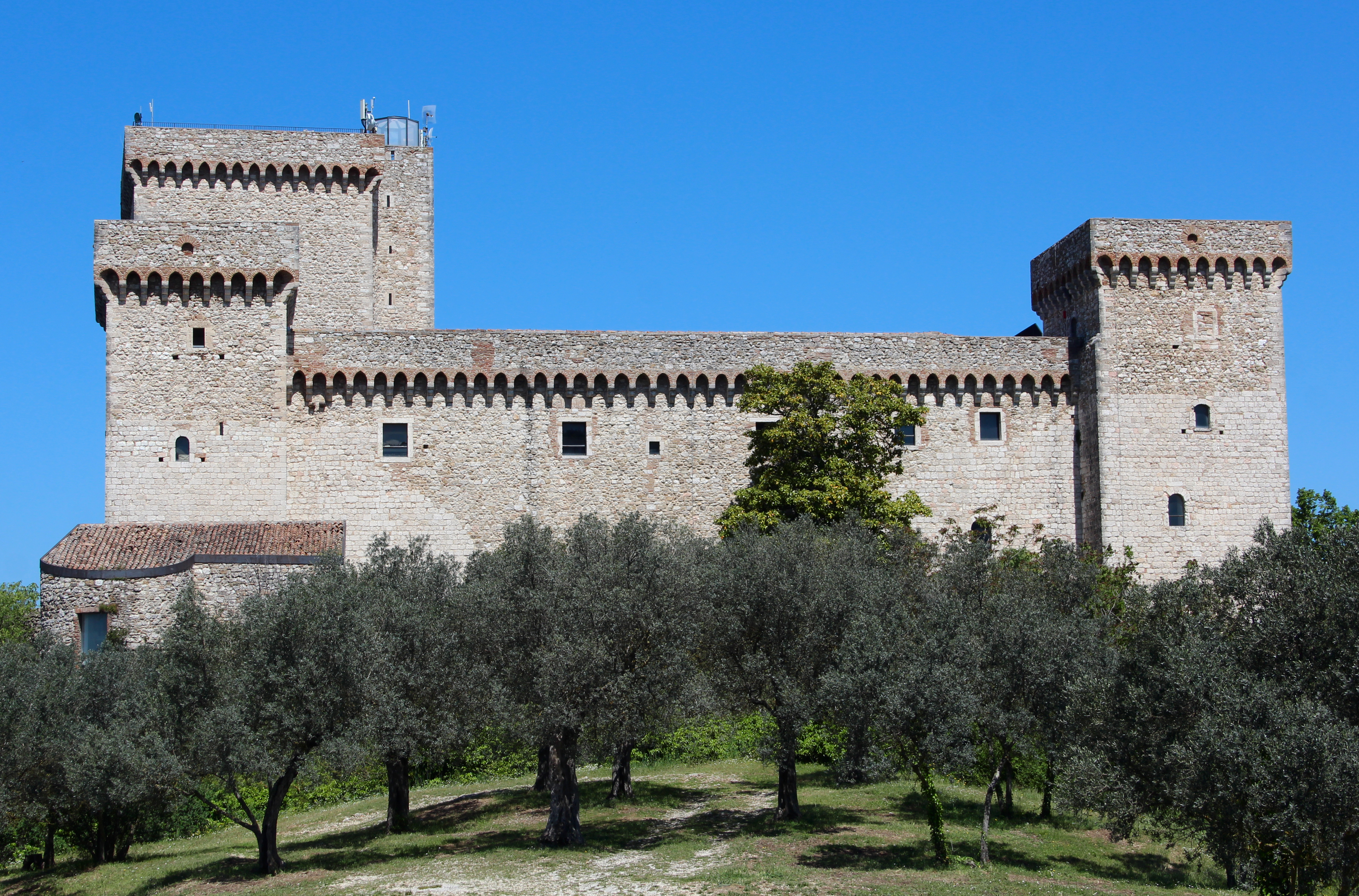
Rocca Albornoz, a fortified complex exemplifying late medieval military architecture

The Rocca Albornoziana stands in a dominant position above Narni and the Gole del Nera. It formed part of the system of fortresses established by the papacy after Avignon to secure the recovered Papal State and to control the territory crossed by the routes toward Perugia, Terni, and Amelia.

The fortress has a quadrangular plan with four corner towers and is surrounded by a moat and a second circuit of walls. The walls and towers enclose a courtyard entered through two portals; the courtyard is also square and bordered by two building ranges, with stairs leading to the first floor, where the seignorial residence was located. The largest tower is identified as the keep.

Construction began in 1367 on the remains of an earlier military settlement built by Frederick Barbarossa. In 1371 Pietro or Giovanni di Nevico, the first castellan, took possession of it, and the works were completed in 1378. The project involved several architects, among them Ugolino I di Montemarte and Matteo Gattapone. Between 1370 and 1449 the fortress served as a residence for popes, cardinals, and condottieri. In 1449, when an outbreak of plague drove Nicholas V to seek refuge there, work began on expanding the defensive structures; these works continued through the end of the 15th century.

The fortress remained under castellans until 1798, when, after the proclamation of the Roman Republic and the flight of Pius VI, French troops stripped it of its weapons in order to make cannon. During the 19th century it served as a prison. In 1906 it was purchased by the Russian prince Meshchersky; later it passed to the province of Terni.

The Rocca stands isolated on an elevation of 332 meters (1,089 ft) in a commanding position over the city. The lower rooms are noted for their solid construction, and coats of arms decorate the north and west walls.

=== Bridge of Augustus ===
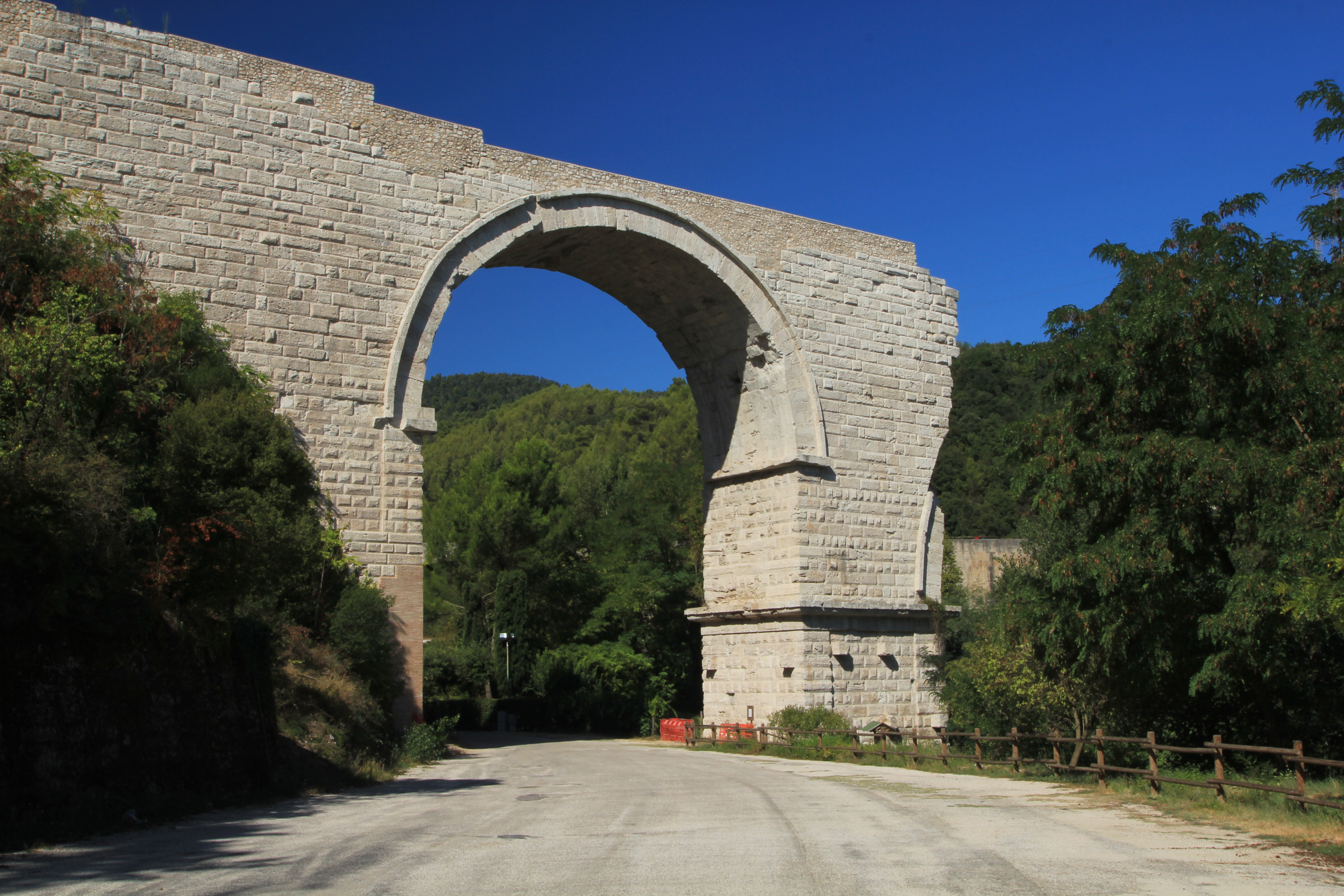
The Bridge of Augustus

The town is famous for the Ponte d'Augusto, one of the largest Roman bridges ever built, by which the Via Flaminia crossed the Nera. One arch of the bridge still stands.

The bridge of Augustus carries the Via Flaminia toward the hill on which the city stands. It was renowned in antiquity and regarded as a source of pride and admiration in the region. It is attributed to Augustus and is mentioned by Martial and Procopius. It connected Monte Maggiore, where Narni stands, with Monte Corviano or Santacroce. Remains include one arch on the Narni side and a pier against Monte Santacroce, with large fragments lying in the riverbed. One pier collapsed on 14 July 1885.

The bridge was built of large squared limestone blocks with a core of rubble and lime, reinforced internally with iron connections. It had four arches, the second wider than the first, and the others somewhat narrower. The total length was 128 meters, with a height of 27 metres (89 ft) from the surviving arch to the road below and 30 metres (98 ft) at the first pier above the water level.

The bridge built was locally known as the Pile d'Augusto.

=== Medieval bridge ===
Upstream from the Roman bridge is a medieval bridge of unknown date, originally built entirely in masonry and restored in 1473. In later times a wooden section was added after part was destroyed by the river. A tower stands at its end, guarding the entrance.

=== Ponte Cardona ===
Ponte Cardona stands in the locality of Montello and is reached by a route lined with large oaks and holm oaks. The bridge is Roman and is built in opus quadratum with travertine blocks. It has a single slightly raised round arch and preserves from the original structure the ring, the vault, the piers, and part of the abutments.

According to studies by the Military Geographic Institute of Florence, the geographical center of peninsular Italy lies along the line of the Roman aqueduct of Formina near this bridge. The spot is marked by a stone marker with a spiral relief ending in a steel element.

=== Acquedotto della Formina ===
The Roman aqueduct known as the Acquedotto della Formina is an extensive network of tunnels and corridors built in the 1st century AD under Tiberius. For centuries it supplied water to Narni and the surrounding territory, and it remained in use until 1924. It is about 13 kilometres (8.1 mi) long and maintains a constant gradient. Built partly in masonry and partly as tunnels through the mountains, it runs along the slopes of the hills, crosses three mountains through three cuttings, and passes over some watercourses by bridges. Fed by six springs, it extends from Sant'Urbano through the old city to the main distribution reservoir.

Part of the aqueduct can be visited along a gallery 700 metres (2,300 ft) long, averaging 45 centimetres (18 in) to 50 centimetres (20 in) in width and 170 centimetres (67 in) to 250 centimetres (98 in) in height, and ending in a rock-cut well 18 metres (59 ft) deep, from which a spiral stair leads back to the surface.

=== Fonte Feronia ===
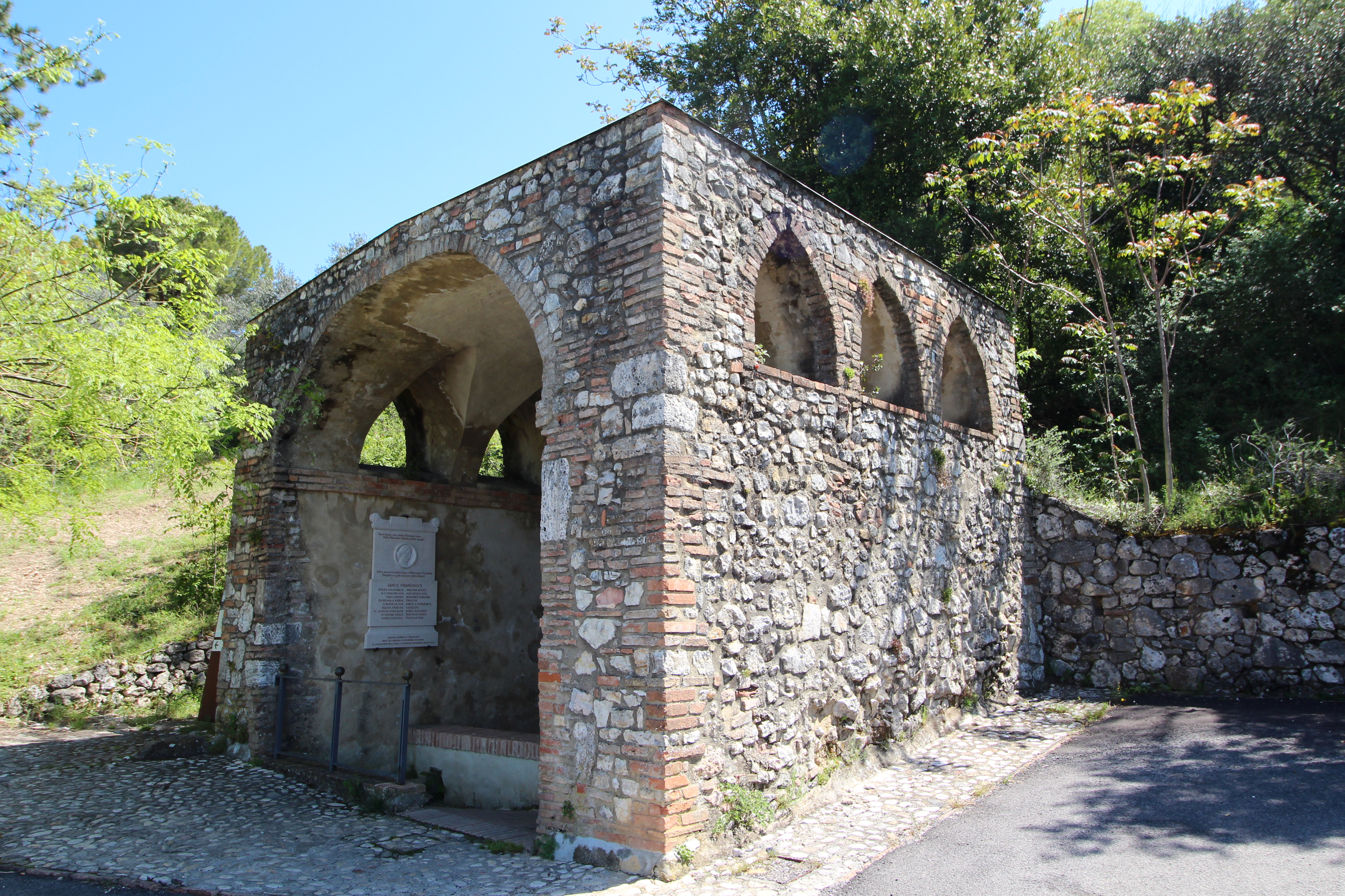
Fonte Feronia, a stone structure that covers and channels a sacred water source

The Fonte Feronia stands within woodland and has a square layout. It is fed by a spring channeled through an underground passage behind the structure. Most of the construction dates to the 4th-3rd centuries BC.

The underground passage runs along an almost straight path and begins in a cave, where water collects from two cracks in the rock. Two vertical shafts, set perpendicular to the passage and lined with masonry, provided air flow and access for maintenance.

The construction of the passage indicates that the site served as a place of worship dedicated to Feronia. The goddess, of Sabine origin, was worshipped in the 4th-3rd centuries BC as a protector of water and woodland and was believed to have healing powers.

=== Palazzo Comunale ===
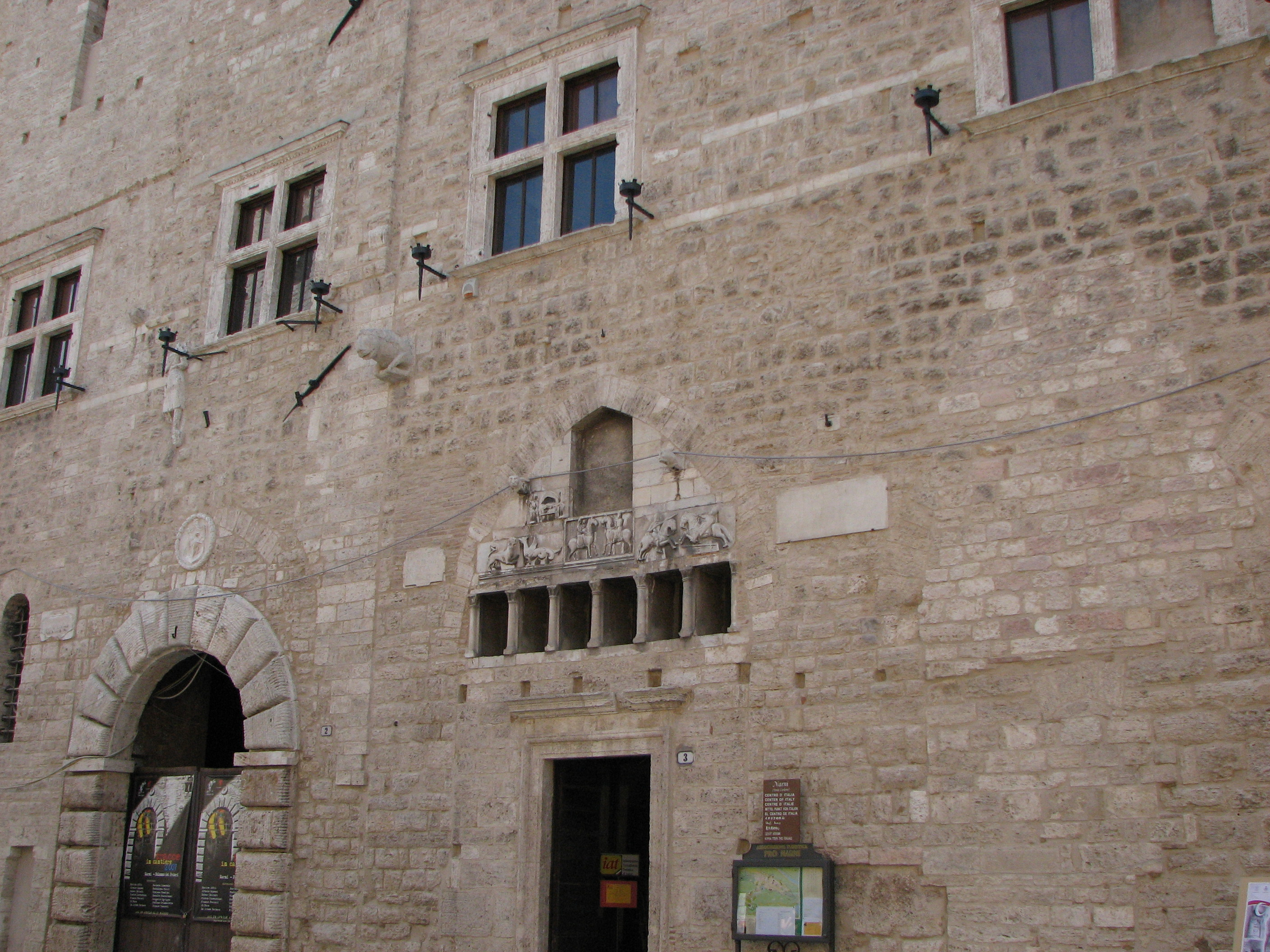
Façade of the Communal Palace

The Palazzo Comunale appears, from the few surviving external remains of the towers forming its façade, to date to the 13th century. Windows and entrances of that period were later closed or altered when the building was reduced to a single structure for municipal residence, a transformation that took place in the 16th century.

Sculptures were placed in the pointed arch above the main entrance, supported by seven small columns. These bas-reliefs depict a lion confronting a dragon, a falcon hunt, and a duel between two knights, dating to the 13th and 14th centuries, as well as the beheading of Holofernes. Six large windows in the façade and atrium were commissioned by Pope Leo X.

The former chapel contains a fresco of Christ blessing among clouds on a gold background, enclosed within an elliptical arrangement of small clouds with faces of seraphim, attributed to Rinaldi. In one hall is a celebrated tempera panel representing the Coronation of the Virgin, recognized as a work by Ghirlandaio. It originally adorned the apse of the church of San Girolamo and is set within a compartmented frame. The scene includes choirs of angels, prophets, and sibyls, and below a group of saints in prayer. Smaller figures in the frame include a hermit saint, Saint John the Evangelist, Saint Clare, Saint Louis, Saint Catherine, and Saint Francis. The predella shows Saint Francis receiving the stigmata, the Pietà, and Saint Jerome in the desert.

=== Palazzo dei Priori ===
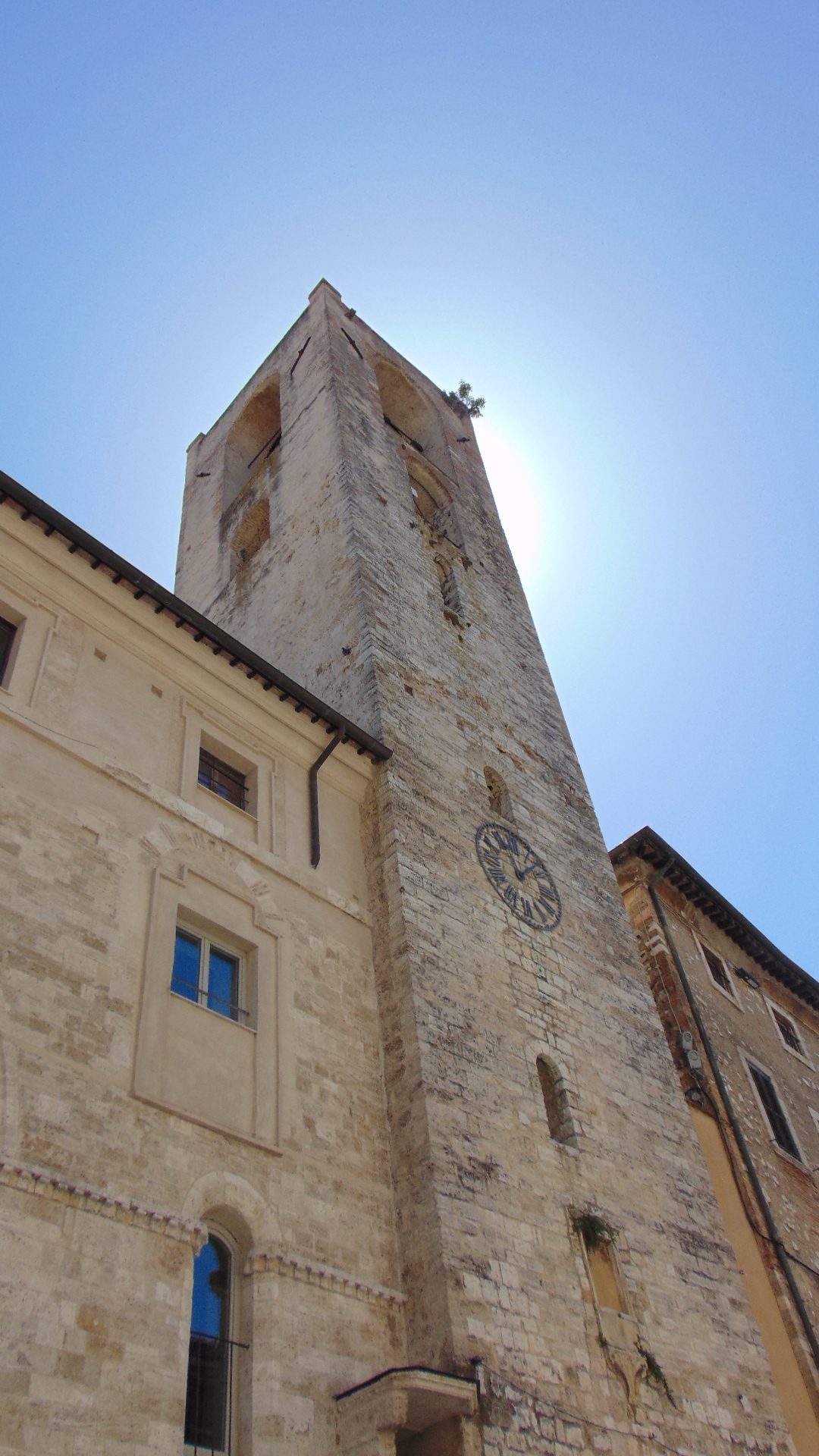
Civic tower of the Palazzo dei Priori, featuring a clock face

The Palazzo dei Priori stands on the east side of Piazza dei Priori. It preserves a portal, the loggetta del banditore, and a loggia attributed to Matteo Gattapone, with a central pillar with chamfered outer angles, two large arches forming the front, and, at the center, an octagonal pillar supporting the vault divided into four sail-shaped bays. The walls preserve traces of inscriptions, frescoes, large windows, and coats of arms. Above the central pillar of the façade is the coat of arms of the Orsini family. Iron rings at a certain height mark the former pillory.

In the medieval period the palace was the seat of the city magistracies. The upper part of the building is a Renaissance addition. Over the centuries it underwent many transformations, and in 1618 it became the seat of the Piarist Fathers, who established there a boarding school and the town school until the mid-19th century. Beside the palace stands the 13th-century civic tower, which dominates the city and the valley. Between the tower and the loggia is the loggetta del banditore, where public notices were read; according to tradition, Bernardino of Siena preached there.

=== Palazzo Eroli ===
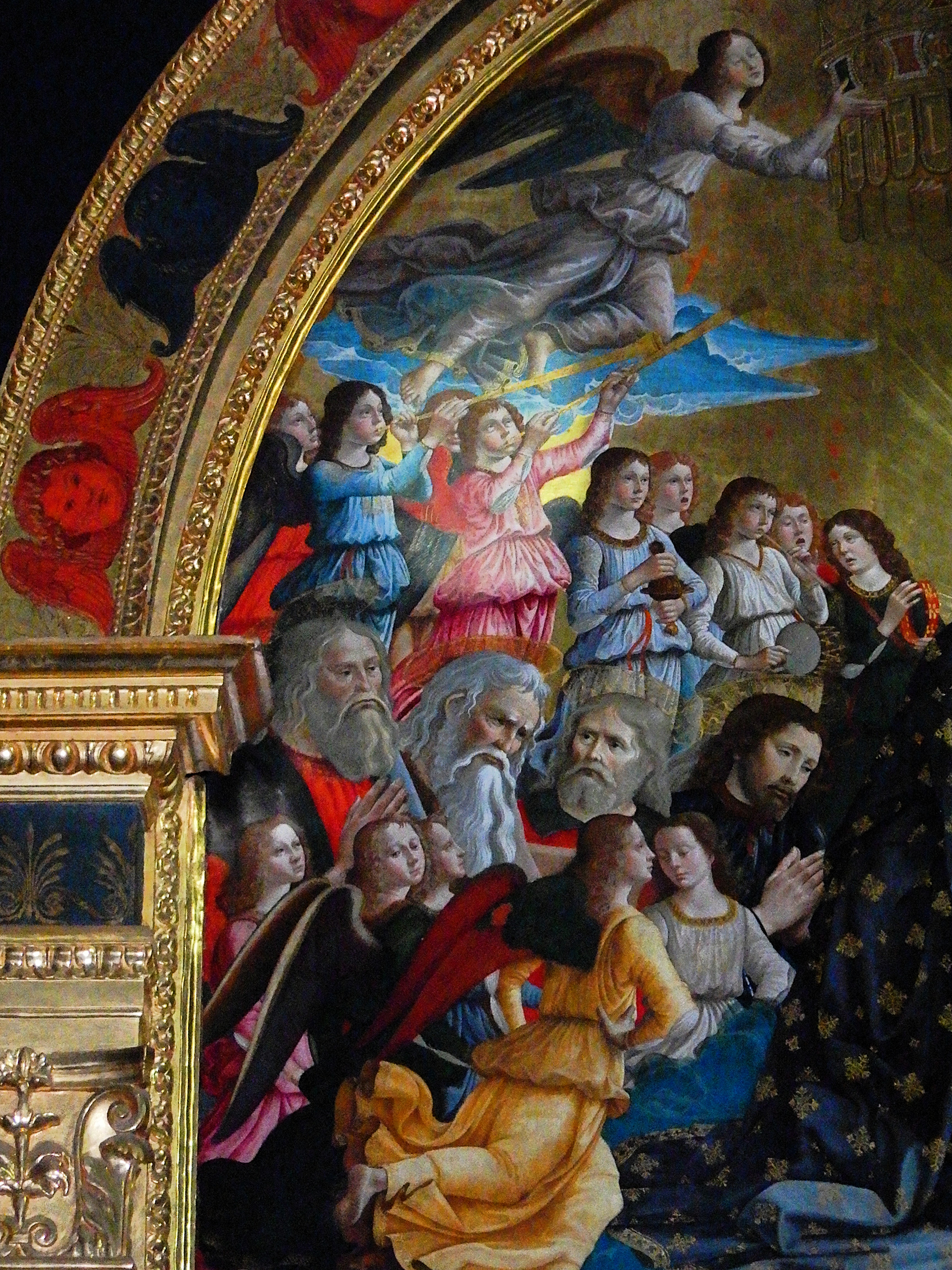
Detail from the Coronation of the Virgin by Domenico Ghirlandaio

The Museo della città e del territorio in Palazzo Eroli is located behind the Palazzo Comunale. It houses major painting, sculpture, and archaeological works connected with the history of the city.

The museum is divided into two sections: an archaeological section, with finds from prehistory to the medieval period, and a picture gallery with works dating from the 14th to the 18th century. Among the works mentioned are the Coronation of the Virgin by Domenico Ghirlandaio, the Annunciation by Benozzo Gozzoli, an Egyptian mummy, a decorated wooden sarcophagus, and the bronze bowl of the fountain in Piazza dei Priori dated 1303.

=== Brefotrofio ===
The Brefotrofio contains several works of art. Opposite the entrance is a tempera painting of the Risen Christ recalling the manner of Luca Signorelli. In a dormitory there is a painting of Mary enthroned with Jesus, by one of the Alfani. In the attached church is a painting with Christ, Mary, Saint Joseph, two saints and angels, in imitation of Barocci. Another painting depicts the Virgin of Sorrows, by Agricola.

=== Other cultural sites ===
Porta Ternana was built in the 15th century under Pope Innocent VIII. Its architecture reflects the military character of the period and it was constructed for defensive purposes.

The Palazzo del Podestà stands almost opposite the Palazzo Comunale and dates to the 14th century. The building housed offices of the registrar and the conciliatory judge, and part of it was used for municipal schools.

On Monte Santacroce there are caves forming long and spacious underground passages communicating with various chambers, attributed to the Umbrian period. The caves were once inhabited by hermits.

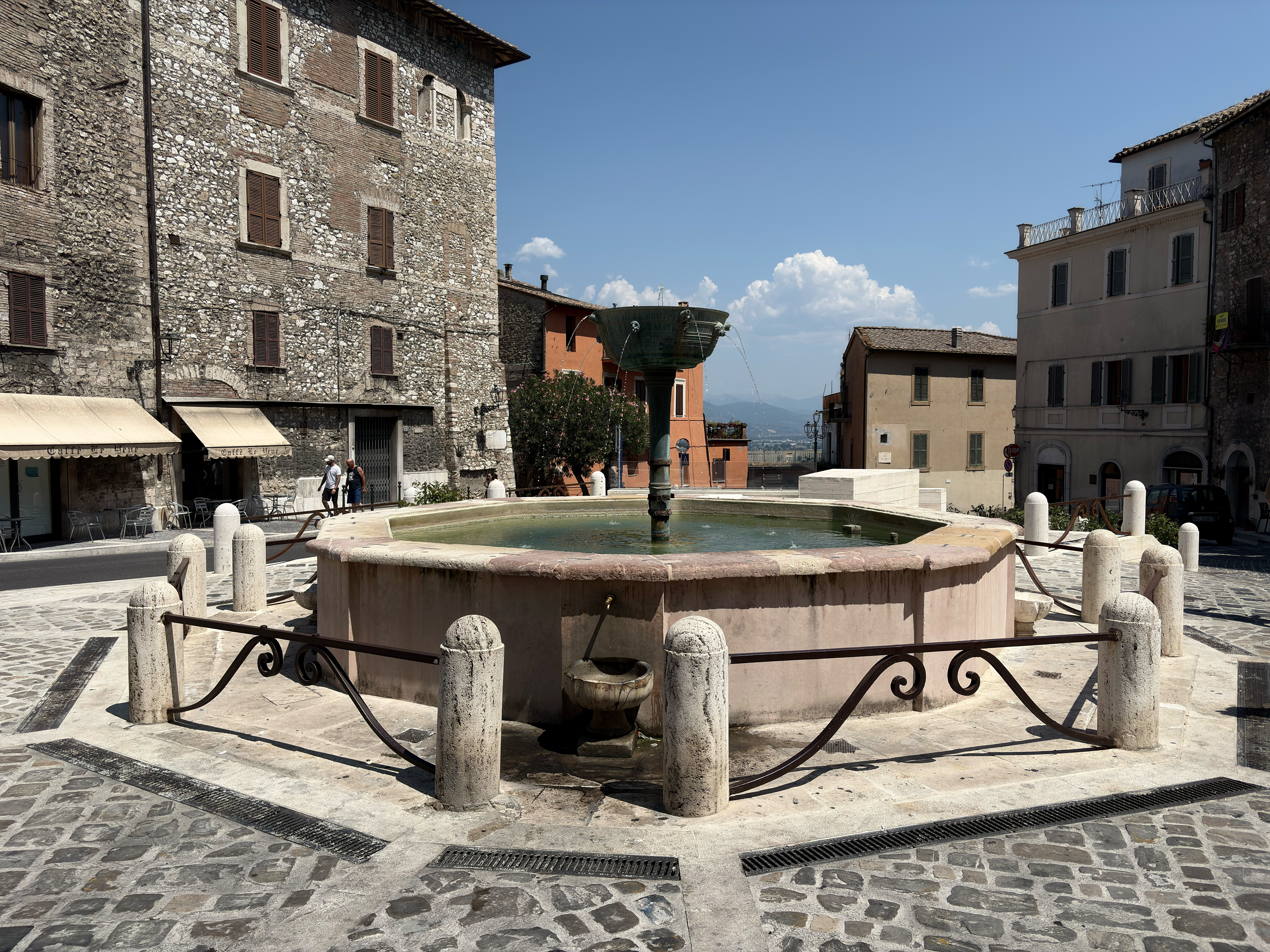
Marble fountain in Piazza Garibaldi

In Piazza Priora, now Piazza Garibaldi, the fountain has a polygonal marble basin, with a central column surmounted by a capital from which project four animal heads. The capital supports a basin decorated in bas-relief with six shields alternating with six animal heads in high relief, while an inscription runs around the lower part, largely illegible due to calcareous deposits. The basin is of bronze and appears to have been cast in a single piece.

At the southern end of the Gole del Nera are the remains of Roman shipyard of Stifone an ancient Roman port and shipyard, attesting to the former navigability of the Tiber and the Nera.

In Via della Valle there is a small house with an arch on the façade, traditionally identified as the birthplace of the condottiero Erasmo Gattamelata.

=== Other cultural aspects ===
The imaginary land of Narnia, described in the works of C. S. Lewis, was named after Narni after he came across the name in an atlas as a child.

== Notable people ==
Narni is the birthplace of the emperor Marcus Cocceius Nerva. Other figures include Bartolomeo, born in 1377, a military and political leader; Giovanni de Floribus, senator in 1433; Egidio Angelo Arca, senator in 1507; Lodovico Arca, who restored part of the Capitoline palace in 1591; Galeotto da Narni, orator and philosopher.

Erasmo of Narni was born there in 1380, the son of a baker from Todi. He became captain general of the Venetians, and was commemorated by the Equestrian statue of Gattamelata, erected by the Venetians in front of the Basilica of Saint Anthony of Padua.

Other notable figures include Pier Damiano Scotto, Massimo Arconi, Michelangelo Arconi, the scholar Francesco Cardoli, the Jesuit Father Piero Caravita, founder of the Oratory of San Francesco Saverio del Caravita in Rome, Cardinal Berardo Eroli, Cardinal Giuseppe Sacripante, and Blessed Lucia of Narni of the Order of Preachers. A relic of her leg, discovered in 1710, is venerated.

Other religious figures from Narni include Juvenal of Benevento; Francesco Eroli; Ennio Massari Filonardi; Canzio Pizzoni; and Constantin Eruli.

Artists and writers include Cassio Brucurelli; Francesco Buti, poet and librettist; Caterina Franceschi Ferrucci, writer and poet; Giovanni Eroli; Adelaide Bernardini, writer, poet, and playwright; Bruno Cagli, musicologist, critic, and librettist; Raffaele Cormio; and Glauco Rossi.

== See also ==
- Diocese of Narni
