= Santa Maria Impensole, Narni =

Church in Narni, Italy

Coordinates: 42.5199874°N 12.5152619°E

Santa Maria Impensole is a Romanesque style church in the center of Narni, Province of Terni, Italy. The church name likely derives from the term in pisilis which refers to either overhanging or held in suspension.

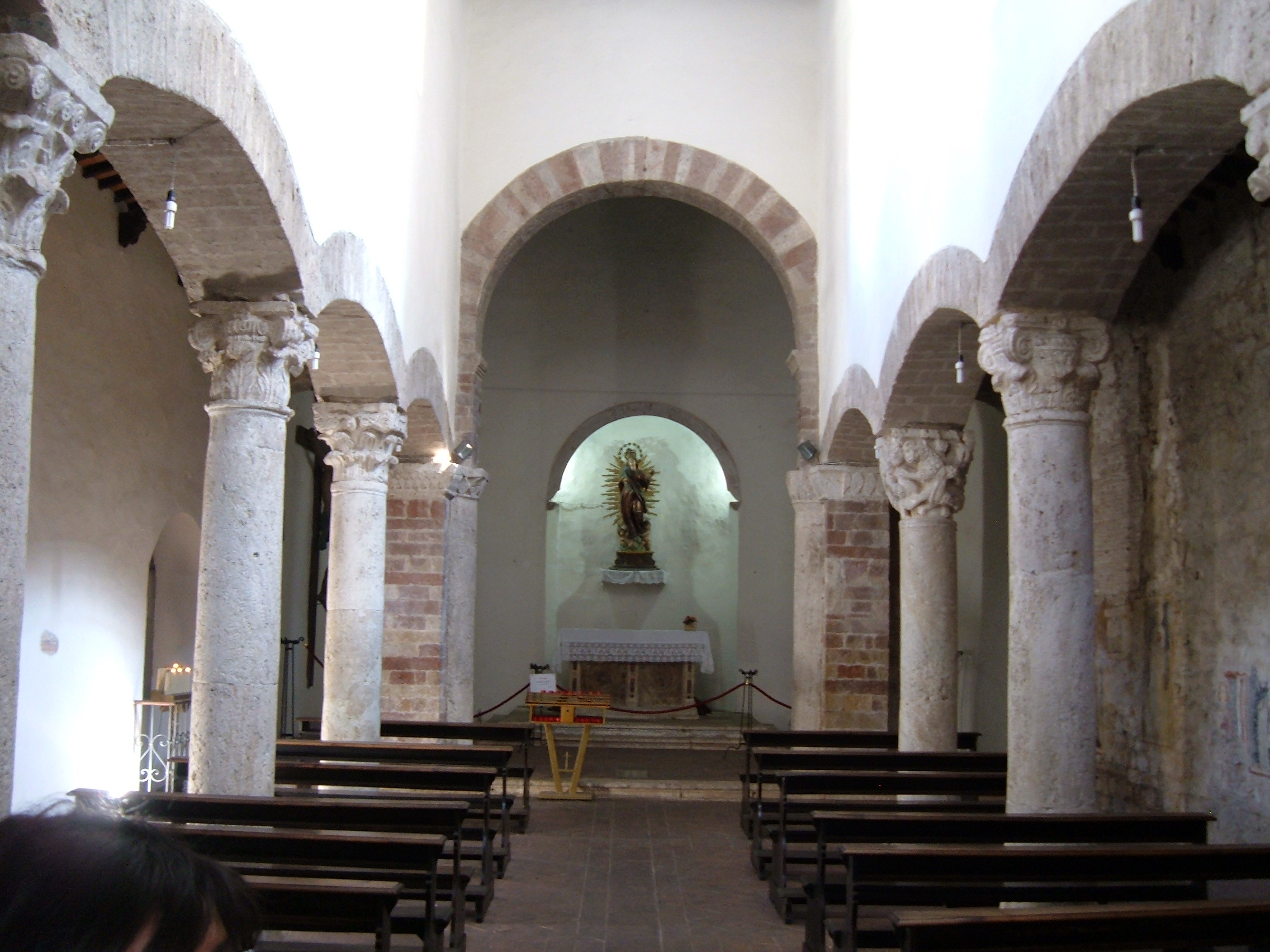
Interior

== History ==
The church was erected over an 8th-century structure, likely once an ancient Roman Temple dedicated to Bacchus. The structure has three naves, subdivided by heavy rounded stone arches with capital with allegorical figures. The entrance portal, dated to the 12th century, has medieval sculptural stone decorations, including a Christ Blessing. Medieval frescoes were discovered during restorations in the 1960s.

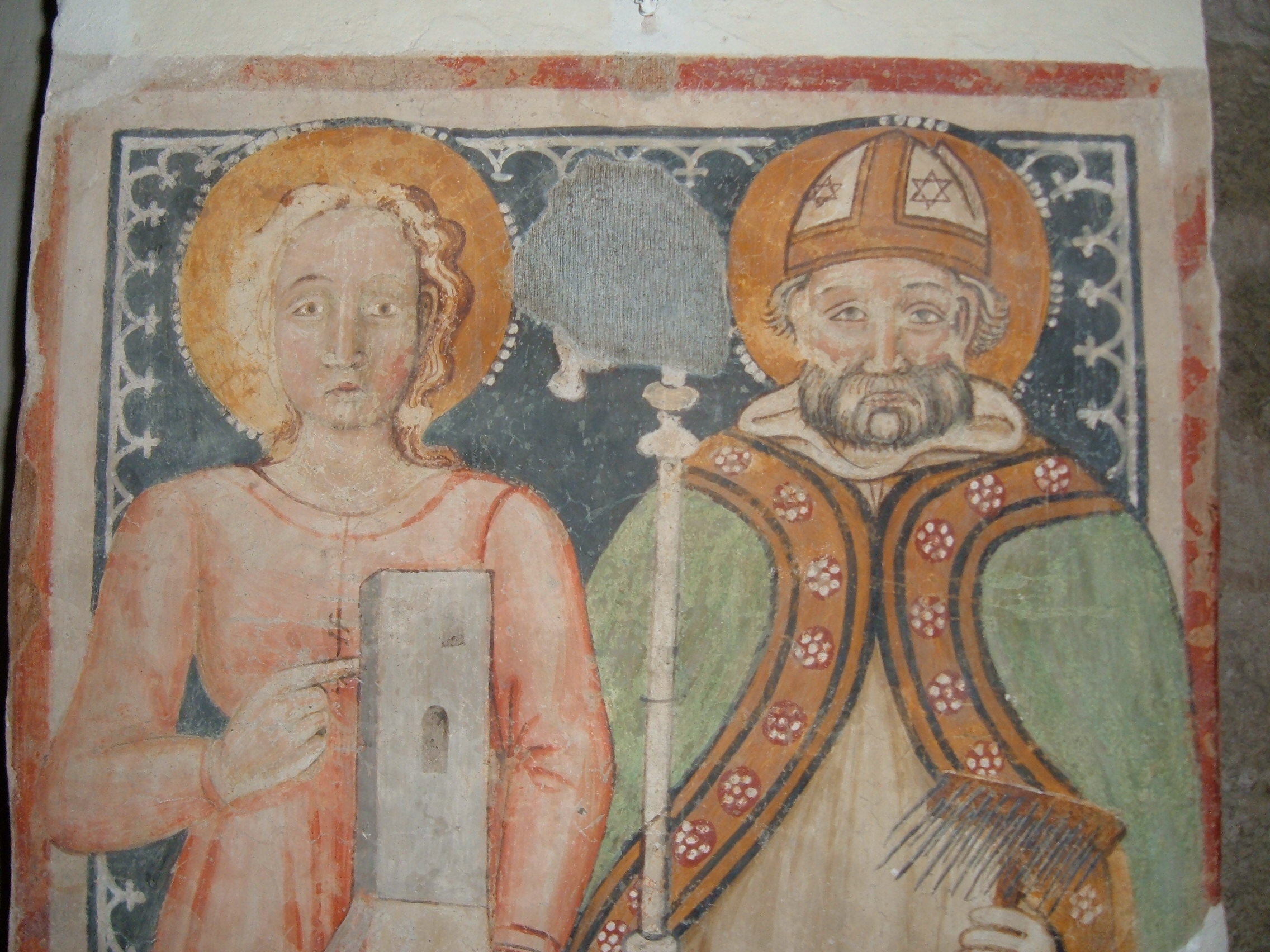
Frescoes
