= Abbey of San Cassiano, Narni =

Church building in Narni, Italy

Coordinates: 42.5240788°N 12.5082839°E

The Abbey of San Cassiano is a former Benedictine monastery, located on Monte Santa Croce, outside of the town of Narni in the Province of Terni, in the Region of Umbria in Italy.

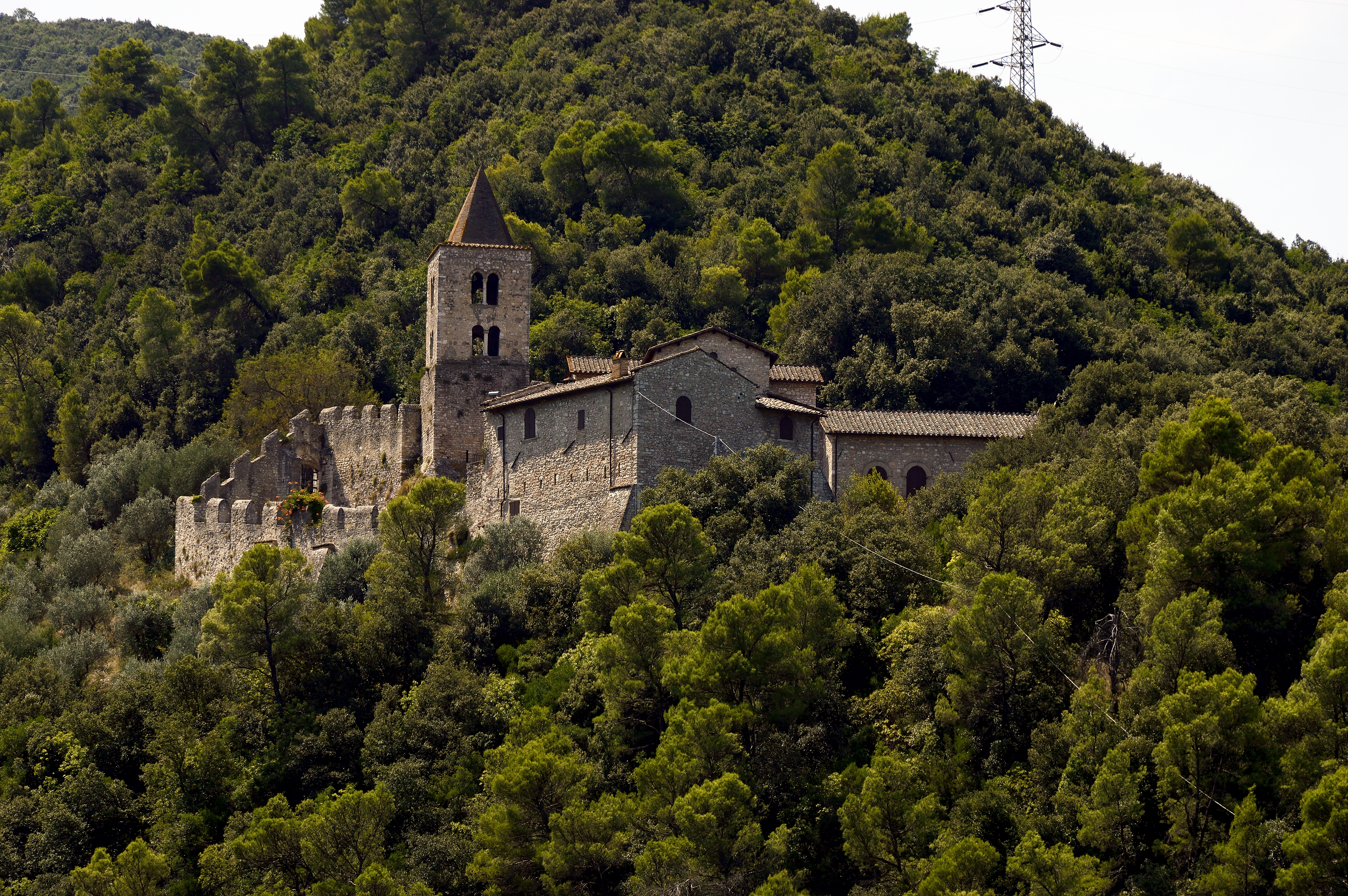
View of the Abbey.

== History ==
Documentary evidence dates the monastery in 1091 falling under the governance of the Abbey of Farfa in Lazio. However, epigraphs at the site point to an earlier foundation. One sarcophagus notes the 10th-century discovery during the reign of Crescentius I (a near relative of Pope John XIII) of relics of the Blessed Orso, a local monk. It is possible that an abbey at the site dates to the occupation of Italy by the Byzantine general Belisarius in the 6th century.

By the 15th century, the abbey was surrounded by defensive walls. Ownership was disputed between Benedictine abbots and the bishops of Narni. By the 19th century, the abbey was abandoned, and nearly a ruined shell, when it passed to private hands in 1849. Spolia from other structures were used in its construction.

In 1960, it was appropriated by the Italian government. Restored in 1963–1970, it still remains closed. The Romanesque architecture stone church with belltower was stripped of Baroque accretions during the latest restoration. The church has a Greek-cross layout.

== See also ==
- Catholic Church in Italy
