= Santa Margherita, Narni =

Church in Narni, Italy

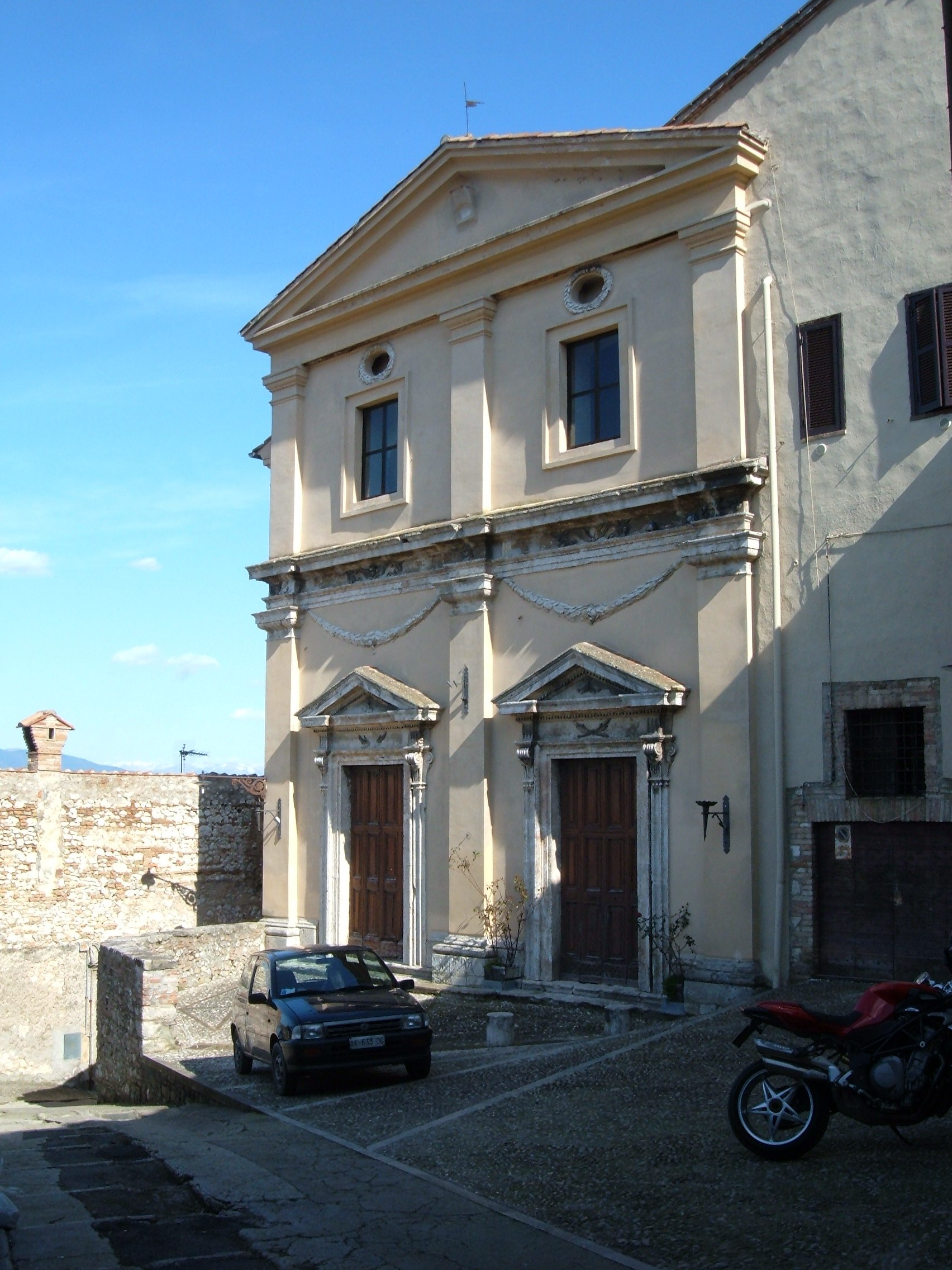
Facade of church\

Santa Margherita is a Renaissance-style, Roman Catholic church in the town of Narni, province of Terni, region of Umbria, Italy.

The construction of the church was started in the late 16th century adjacent to a Benedictine order convent. It was completed in 1602 and then located adjacent to the wall of the town. The church has an elegant facade with Doric travertine pilasters and garlands. The single nave leads to an apse which contained a grate by which the cloistered nuns could receive the eucharist. On the walls and main altar are canvases painted by the Zuccari depicting the life of the titular saint. The monastery was ultimately suppressed in 1892.
