= Montecastrilli =

- Comune
- Comune di Montecastrilli
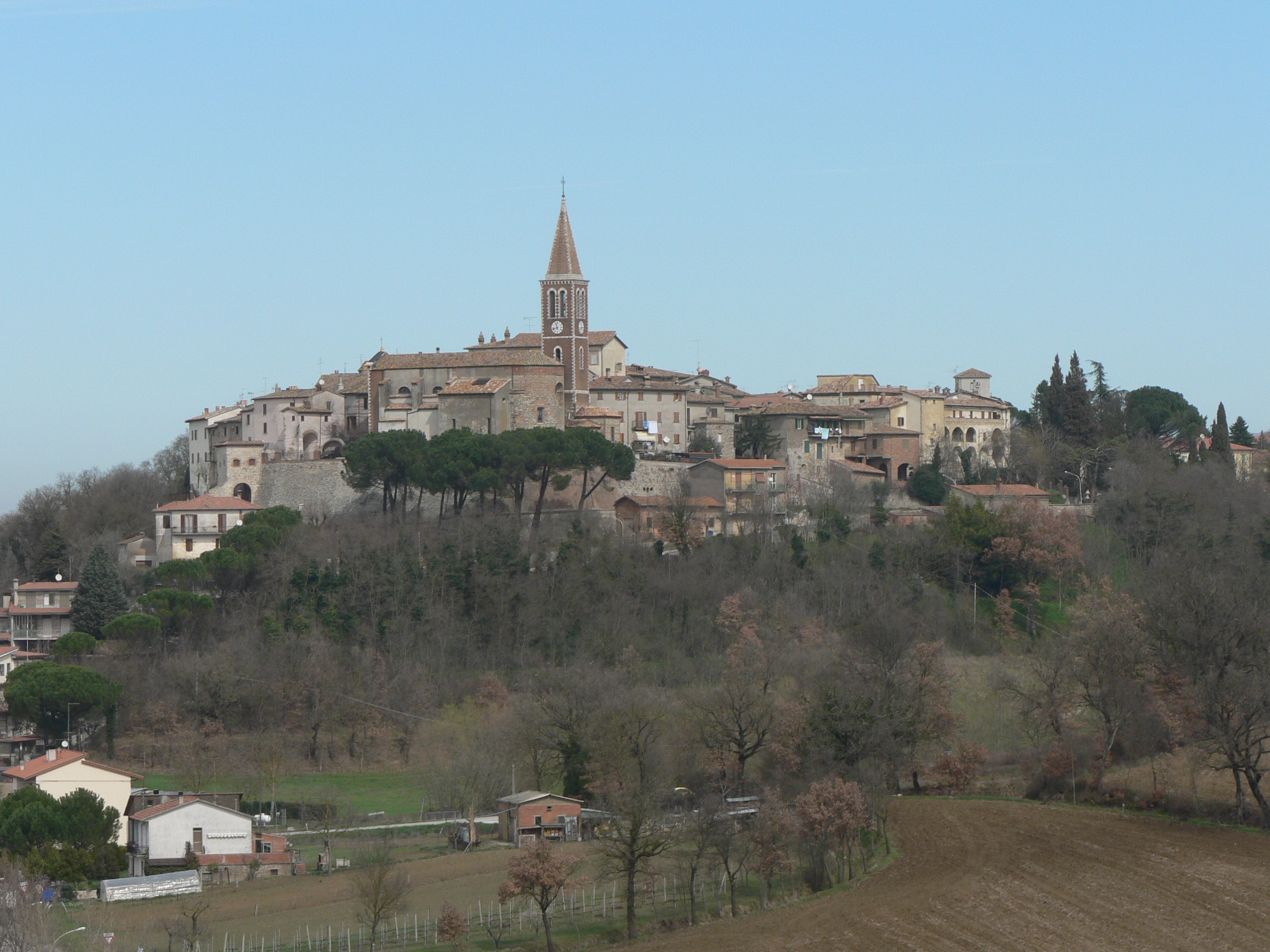
- View of Montecastrilli

- Coat of arms

- Location within Italy Location within Umbria
- Coordinates: 42.649841°N 12.48784°E
- Country: Italy
- Region: Umbria
- Province: Terni (TR)

Government
  - Mayor: Fabio Angelucci

Area
  - Total: 62.43 km^{2} (24.10 sq mi)
- Elevation: 391 m (1,283 ft)

Population (1 January 2025)
  - Total: 4,795
  - Density: 76.81/km^{2} (198.9/sq mi)
- Demonym: Montecastrillesi
- Time zone: UTC+1 (CET)
  - Summer (DST): UTC+2 (CEST)
- Postal code: 05026
- Dialing code: 0744
- Patron saint: St. Nicholas of Myra
- Saint day: December 6
- Website: Official website

Montecastrilli is a comune (municipality) in the Province of Terni in the Italian region of Umbria, located about 50 km south of Perugia and about 15 km northwest of Terni.

== History ==
=== Ancient period ===
Local tradition holds that in 217 BC, during the Second Punic War, Hannibal is said to have encamped in the area, though this episode is considered legend.

In the 1st century BC the territory was subject to Roman centuriation under Augustus, when lands were divided and assigned to veterans from Todi.

Around the year 1000, the fortified borgo emerged in the area known as the Terre Arnolfe. The earliest known documentary reference to the settlement dates to 1059. In the 12th century the feudal unity of the Arnolfi family came to an end, and jurisdiction over Montecastrilli passed to the Comune of Todi.

=== Early modern period ===
During the 15th century the settlement became involved in the wider Guelphs and Ghibellines conflicts that affected central Italy, particularly in the rivalry between the Atti and the Chiaravalle families. In 1480 Montecastrilli supported the Atti faction; the castle was subsequently besieged, and the situation required the intervention of Bartolomeo d'Alviano. Between 1496 and 1500 Pope Alexander VI acted against Altobello Chiaravalle, and Montecastrilli was placed under direct clerical administration. In 1512 Pope Julius II restored jurisdiction to Todi.

The turmoil of 1527 brought another crisis, when Landsknechts laid siege to the area. The conflict was accompanied by plague and famine.

=== Modern period ===
In 1810, under Napoleonic rule, Montecastrilli became an autonomous municipality within the Department of Trasimene. Following the fall of Napoleon, the papal restoration of 1816–1817 returned the territory to the Papal States. Montecastrilli was confirmed as an autonomous community with the Delegation of Perugia. In 1827 the hamlet of Configni was transferred to Acquasparta, while Sismano was incorporated as an appodiato. Two years later, in 1829, the municipality was assigned to the Delegation of Spoleto.

In August 1849 the area was occupied by French troops, accompanied by a Spanish column under Fernando Fernández de Córdova, during the suppression of the Roman Republic. After 1849 the previous papal administrative order was restored.

In 1859 the municipality had a population of 3,798 inhabitants. Of these, 1,361 resided in the built-up centers forming the municipality, while 2,437 lived in the countryside.

On 4 and 5 November 1860 a plebiscite sanctioned the annexation of Montecastrilli to the Kingdom of Italy.

In 1975 Avigliano was detached from Montecastrilli, leading to the establishment of the municipality of Avigliano Umbro.

== Geography ==
Montecastrilli is built on a hill, and located near the road connecting Todi and Narni.

From its elevated position it overlooks Amelia, Portaria, San Gemini, Cesi, Frattuccia, Colcello, the Hermitage of Cesi and Foci. The settlement developed in a semicircular form, partly extending toward the north.

The municipal territory is largely hilly and mountainous, with predominantly clayey soils. The area includes numerous wooded tracts, among them Farneta, Castel dell'Aquila, Civitella and Vaglione.

=== Subdivisions ===
The municipality includes the localities of Casanova, Castel dell'Aquila, Casteltodino, Collesecco, Farnetta, Masteria, Montecastrilli, Ponte, Quadrelli, San Martino.

In 2021, 1,171 people lived in rural dispersed dwellings not assigned to any named locality. At the time, most of the population lived in Montecastrilli proper (1,223), and Casteltodino (1,023).

== Economy ==
In the mid-19th century, agriculture formed the principal occupation of the population. Owing to the largely hilly terrain, cereal cultivation was limited, though the territory produced abundant wine, while olive oil was comparatively scarce. The municipality was rich in acorns and pastureland, supported by extensive woodland. Chestnuts were plentiful in several hamlets, and livestock breeding was significant, including trade in pigs supported by the surrounding forests. A well-frequented rural inn stood along the provincial road between Narni and Todi near Casteltodino. Lignite deposits were also recorded in the area.

== Religion and culture ==
=== San Nicolò ===
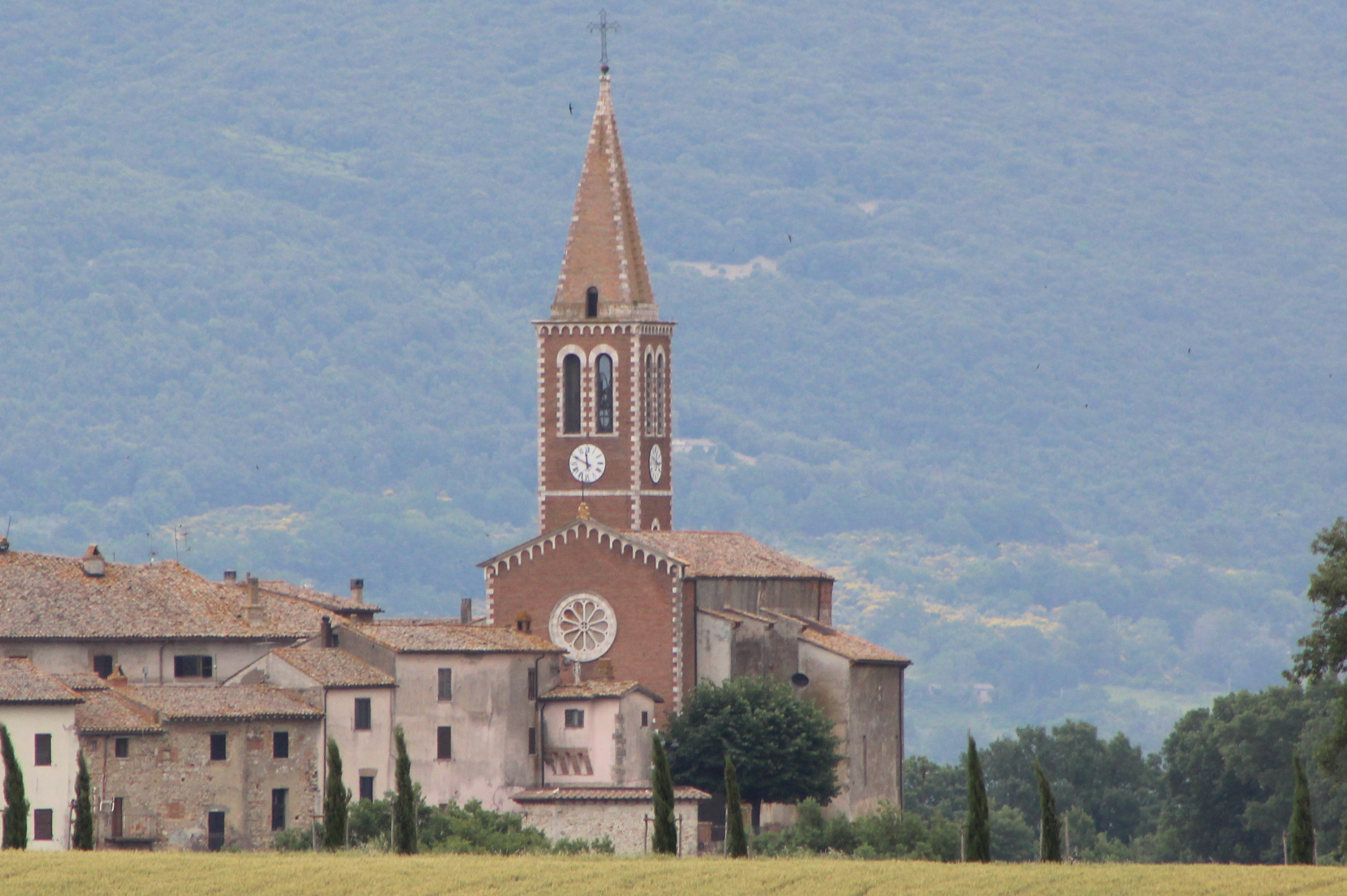
Church of San Nicolò

The parish church of San Nicolò was built between the 10th and 11th centuries and underwent a complete restoration in 1964, particularly affecting the façade and the bell tower.

The interior is arranged into six votive chapels, three of which are in Baroque style. The church preserves painted decorations attributed to Zuccari, a 16th-century icon of the Madonna Refugium Peccatorum, a 15th-century wooden crucifix, and a 16th-century painting by Bartolomeo Poliziano.

The church, vaulted and supported by seven altars and twelve small columns, contains a painting of the Last Supper executed in 1602 by Archita Ricci. The bell tower is low and square in form.

The feast day of San Nicolò is celebrated on 6 December.

=== Other religious heritage ===
The Monastery of the Capuchin Poor Clares was located in Montecastrilli, and their small church of Santa Chiara, equipped with an organ, celebrated the feast of Saint Clare on 12 August. In the church of Santa Chiara, the high altar preserves an oil painting in an elaborately carved frame depicting the Virgin Mary with the Christ Child, with Saint Francis and Saint Clare below. The work is attributed to an 18th-century Roman school.

Castel dell'Aquila has the church of San Giacomo Maggiore and, above it, an ancient fort known as Forte Cesare, near which stands the church of Santa Croce with five altars and a venerated crucifix reportedly donated to the Atti family by Pope Innocent XIII.

Another small church in the town is dedicated to San Giovanni Battista.

Among the other churches in the municipality are Santa Maria di Ciciliano, an 11th-century church, and San Lorenzo in Nifili, also dating to the 11th century.

The parish church of Santa Maria Assunta in Quadrelli dates from the 11th-12th century, while the parish church of San Bartolomeo in Casteltodino dates to the 12th century. Also in Quadrelli is the church of Santa Rosario, a Baroque building of the 17th century.

=== Porta Amerina ===
Porta Amerina, also known as the Torre del Belvedere, is characterized by two arches and forms part of the remains of the ancient fortified complex of Montecastrilli. Together with the medieval gate, it is among the surviving elements of the town's defensive system, including sections of the city walls and a series of crenellated towers that are still visible.

== Notable people ==
19th-century accounts highlight several prominent local families. In Montecastrilli the Polidori family is described as a leading household, while Farnetta was home to the affluent Nevi family.
