= San Francesco, Acquasparta =

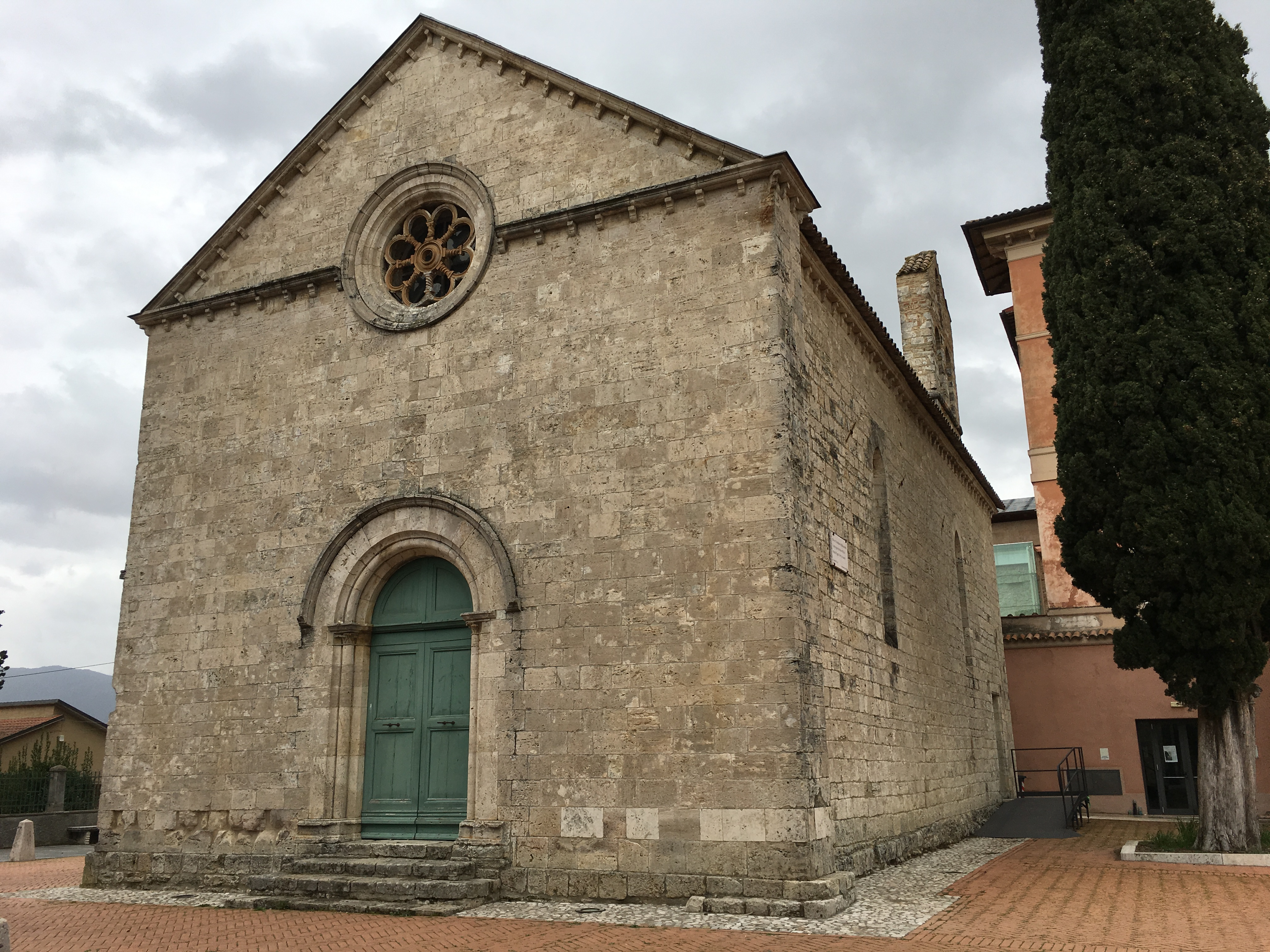
- 42°41′35″N 12°32′43″E
- Location: Acquasparta, Italy
- Denomination: Roman Catholic
- Website: http://www.parrocchiadiacquasparta.it/chiesa-di-san-francesco/

Architecture
- Style: Romanesque/gothic

San Francesco is a romanesque/gothic-style, church located in Acquasparta, Province of Terni, region of Umbria, Italy.

Located outside the city walls of the town, the church was commissioned in 1294 by Cardinal Matteo Bentivenga. The church was once attached to a Franciscan monastery, of which the refectory and cloister still survive. Inside the church is a venerated icon of the Virgin and Child from the 14th century, titled the Madonna della Stella. There is also a copy of a depiction of St Francis painted by Margaritone d'Arezzo. The painted crucifix in the church (14th century) was brought here from the church of San Giovanni di Butris.
