= Farnetta =

Village in Umbria, Italy

Farnetta Castrum Farnectae
- Frazione
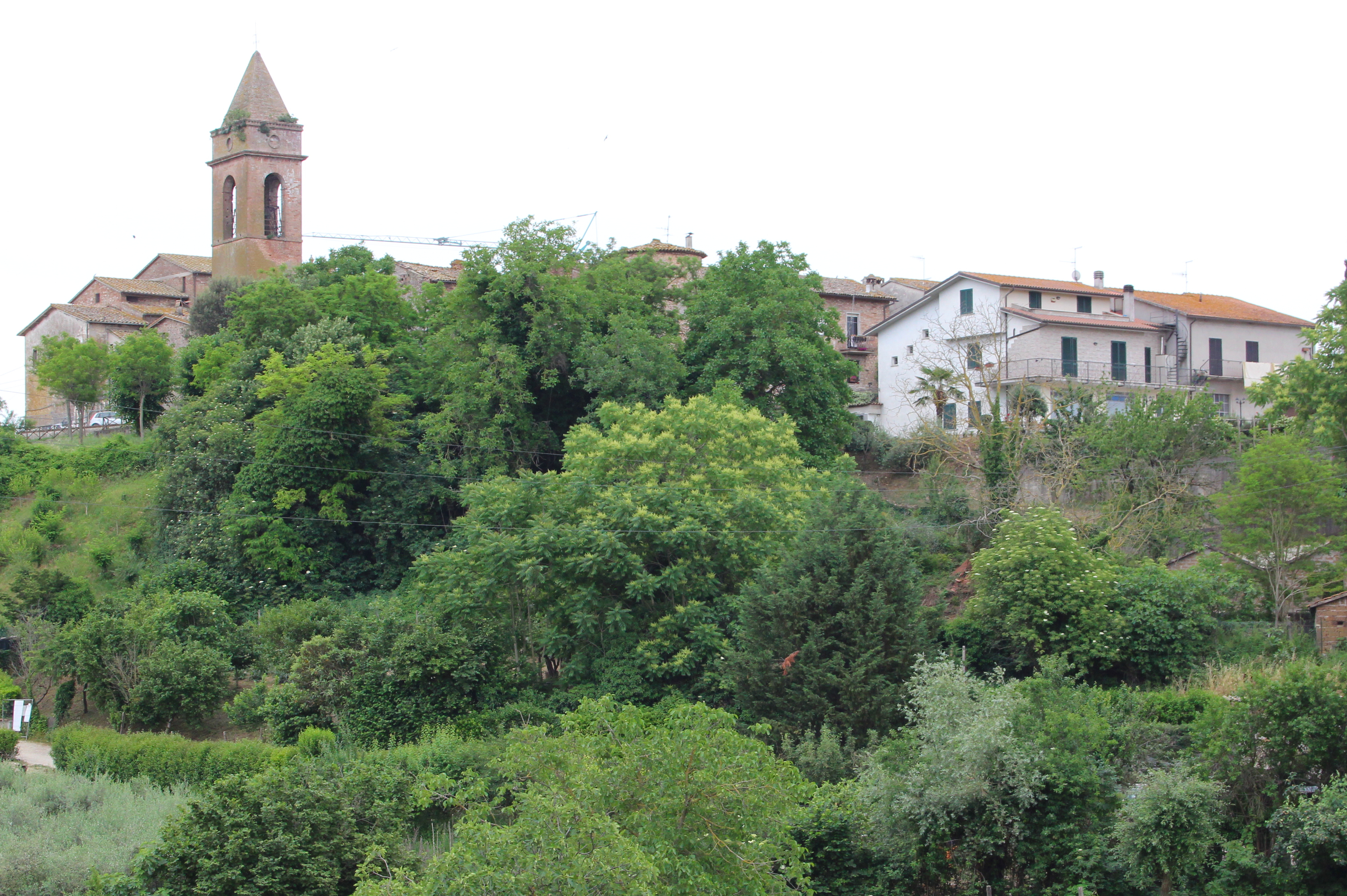
- View of Farnetta

- Location of Farnetta in Italy
- Coordinates: 42°40′N 12°30′E
- Country: Italy
- Region: UMB
- Province: TR
- Comune: Montecastrilli
- Elevation: 385 m (1,263 ft)

Population (31 December 2024)
  - Total: 278
- Demonym: Farnettani
- Time zone: UTC+1 (CET)
  - Summer (DST): UTC+2 (CEST)
- Postal code: 05026
- Dialing code: 0744
- Patron saint: St. Rita
- Saint day: May 22
- Website: Official website

Farnetta is a small village in the countryside of the Terre Arnolfe, 16 miles (≈26 km) northwest of the Italian city of Terni, in the region of Umbria, central Italy. It is part of the comune of Montecastrilli in the province of Terni. It has a population of 278 as of 2024.

Farnetta derives its name from the old Latin name Quercus Frainetto. It is reputed to be one of Umbria's smallest villages. It has several farms and houses, and a church, dedicated to St Nicolaus, which has its origins in the 16th century but underwent heavy restoration in 1855-1870. The church has been designated by Ministry of Culture (Italy) (Soprintendenza).

On a nearby hill are the remains of a Medieval hill fort known as Palombara, and the 10th-11th century Romanesque Church of San Lorenzo in Nifili. San Lorenzo was built on the remains of a Roman building, and incorporates large stone blocks from that building. The church is located on an important Roman road (Via Amerina) connecting Amelia to Todi and Perugia.

== History ==
It is likely that the area was also inhabited in the Iron Age and throughout the Roman period. Close to the Roman roads Amerina and Flaminia, the area has numerous elements of early Roman infrastructure, indicating that it was extensively settled.

The name of the village is traditionally connected to the toponym Quercus frainetto, which is a species of oak.

The territory where Farnetta was constructed centuries later, was near the borders of three Roman cities: Todi, Carsulae and Amelia. After the fall of the Roman empire, the territory was devastated by barbaric invasions and people moved to live in the oak forests. The village of Farnetta was likely founded in the 9th-10th century during the encastellation times.

The village was later part of the Terre Arnolfe, under the feudal rule of the Arnolfi family, and later subjected to Todi and Terni. The church of Farnetta was listed in the Farfa Abbey register in 1112.

Following the fall of the Arnolfi rule, the territory of Farnetta passed under the jurisdiction of the comune of Todi, but again it was on the border with the territories of other cities. In medieval times, the small village was circled with stone walls to protect inhabitants from attacks by the nearby cities of Amelia and Narni.

Farnetta became part of the Papal States in 1367, and it remained subject to them till 1860, apart for small periods of time (Napoleonic era). It was in the religious jurisdiction of the bishop of Todi.

In 1817, the administrative jurisdiction of Farnetta passed from Todi to Terni.

== Main sights ==
Farnetta is 385 meters above sea level. Farnetta is located at the heart of a protected landscape area, with trails and cycling routes, in one of the most picturesque parts of Umbria, surrounded by green hills, medieval villages, castles, and fortresses. Its thousand-year-old history is deeply intertwined with the region’s rich culinary tradition and architectural heritage.

Its historical center is surrounded by medieval walls. Part of them have been dismantled, leaving only short stretches and a few cylindrical towers that served as part of the castle's defenses.

The church of San Nicolò (Nicolaus), in the old part of the village, was begun in the 16th century and completed in the 19th century by the Nevi family. It includes 17th- and 18th-century paintings.

The small rural church of St. Lucia has been recently restored: this church dates back to 17th century and it is connected with the medieval cult of St. Lucy, patron saint of the blind and those suffering from eyes problems, and St. Apollonia, the patroness of dentistry and those suffering from toothache. The church includes an important oil painting from the 17th century.

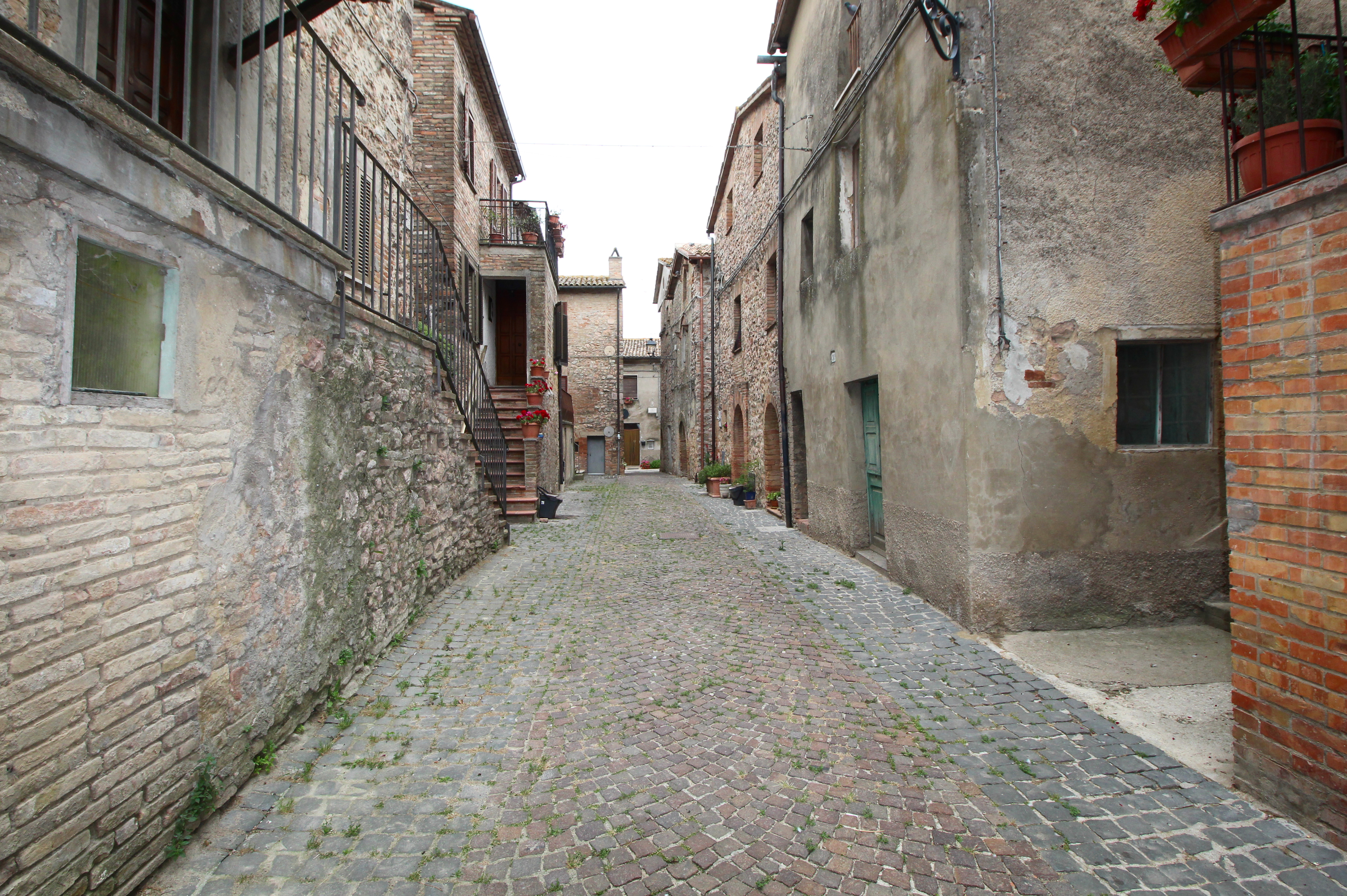
Farnetta

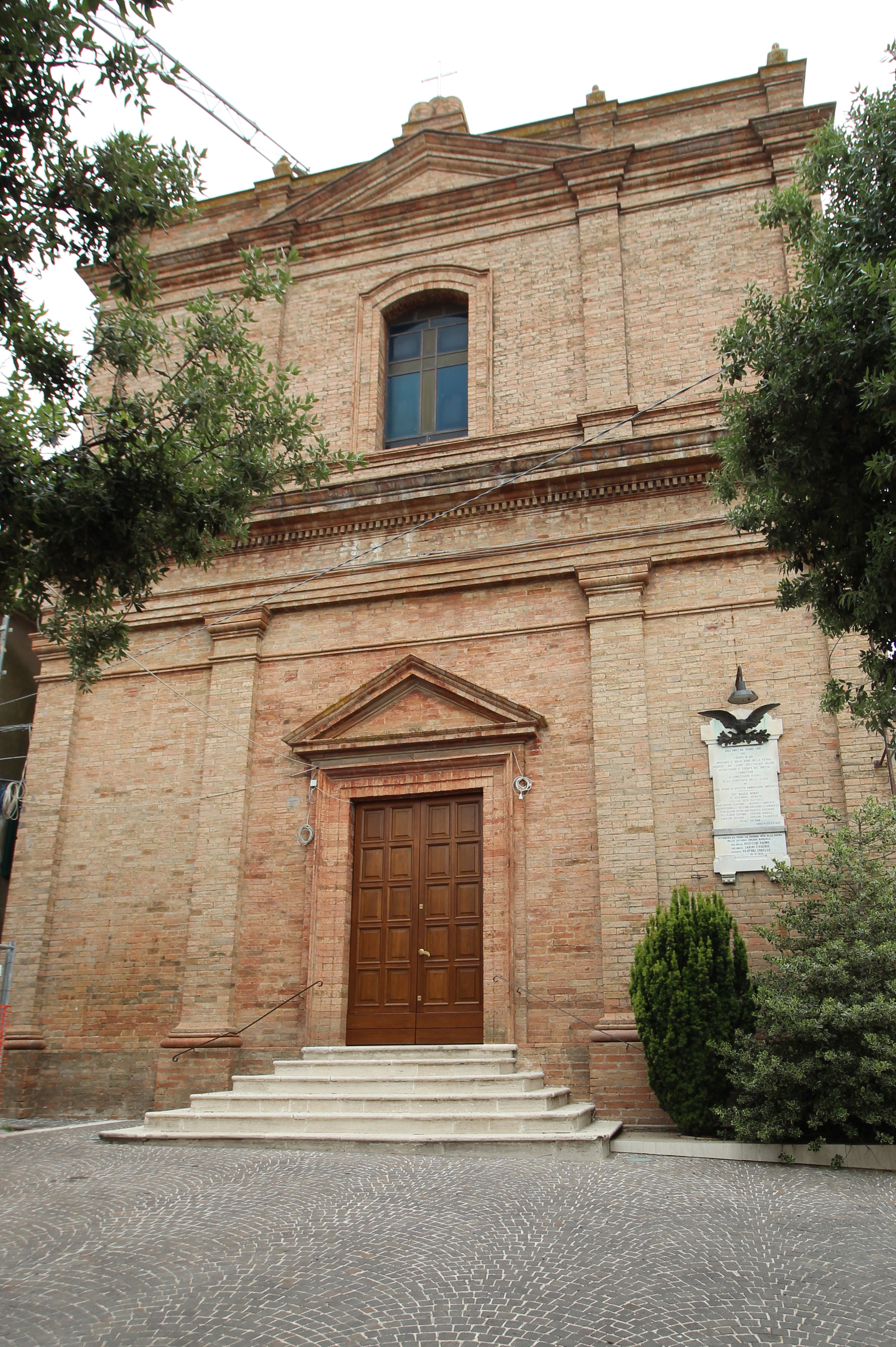
San Nicolò

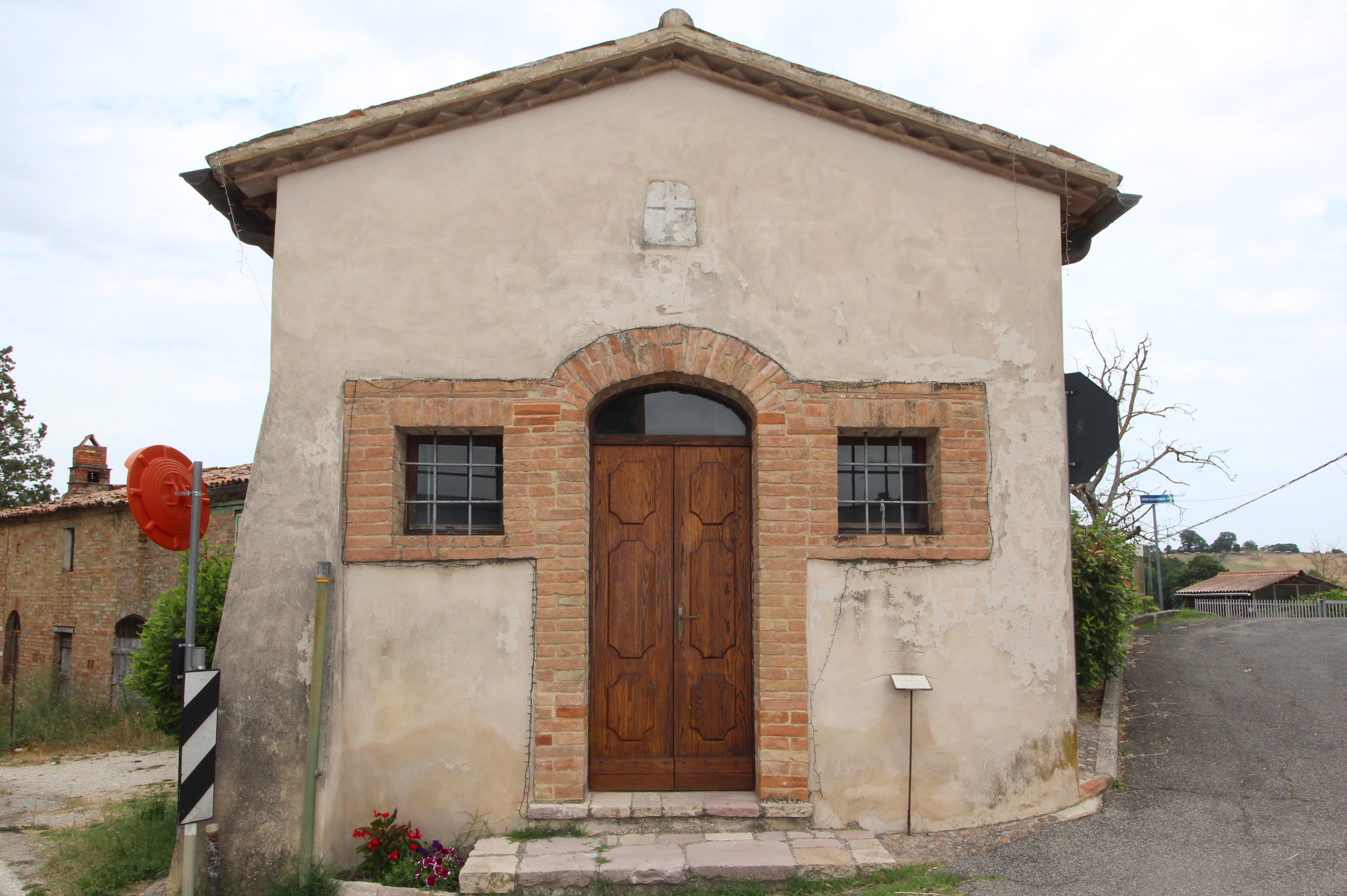
Santa Lucia

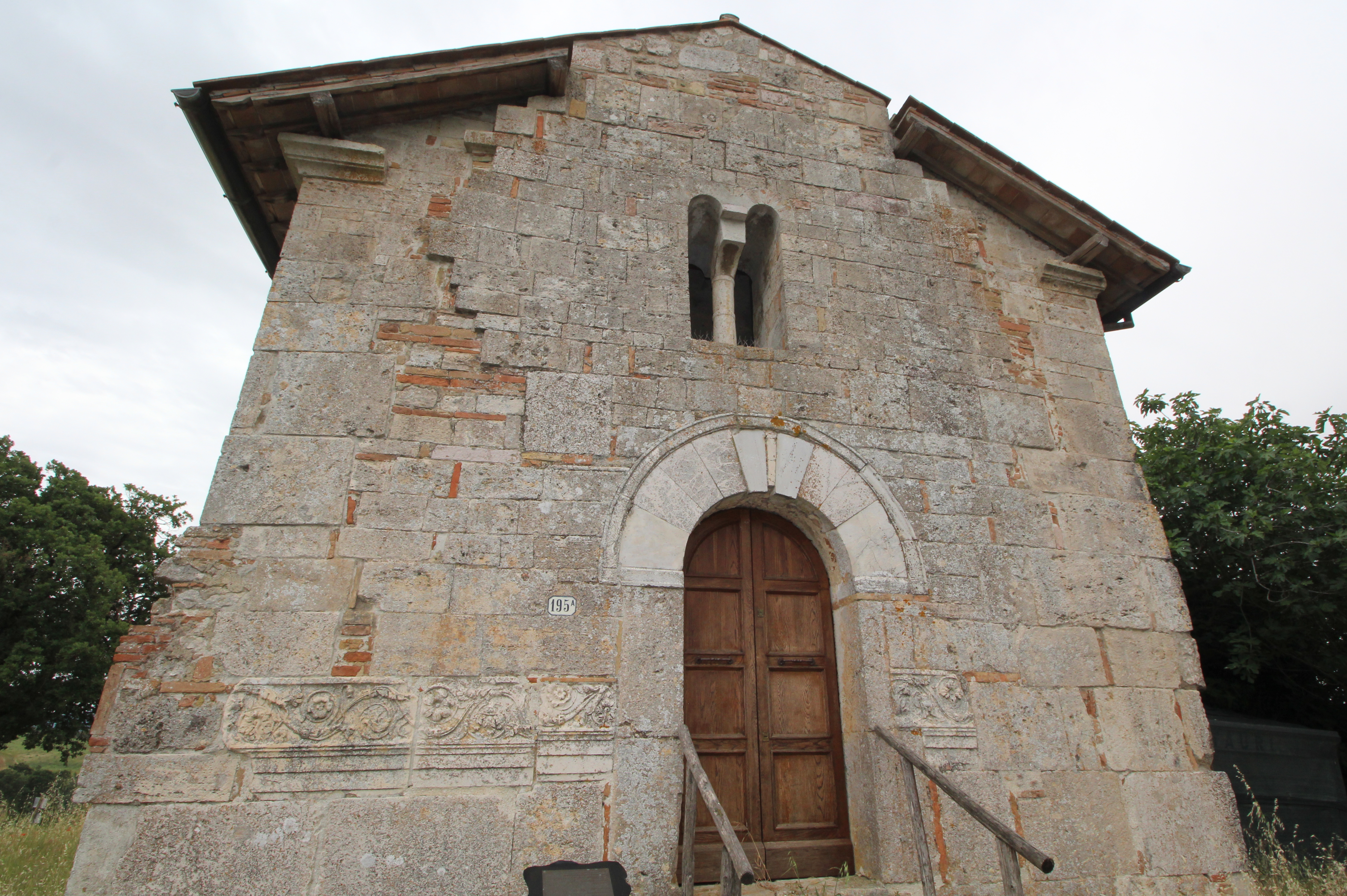
San Lorenzo in Nifili

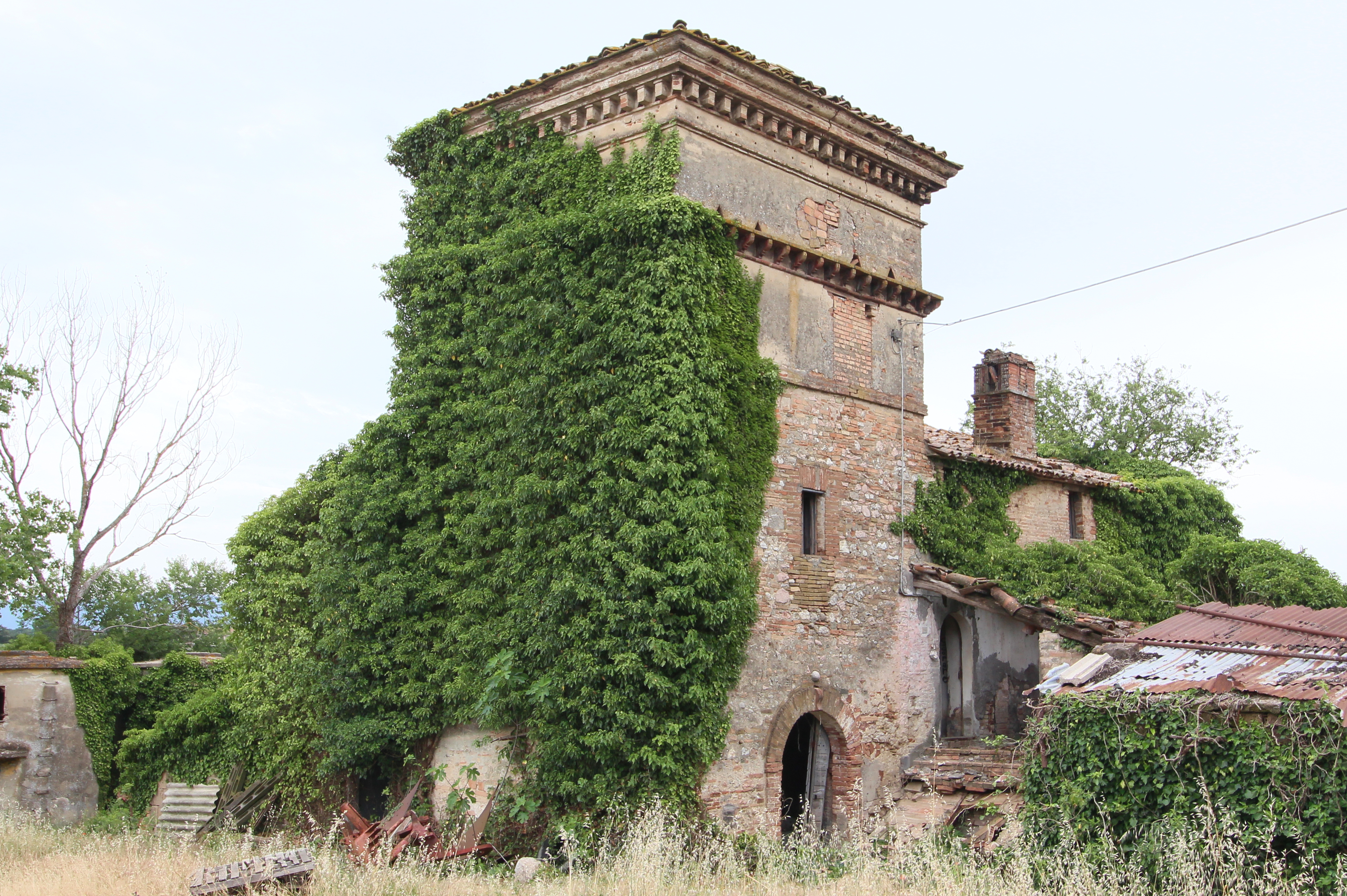
Palombara Tower

=== Dunarobba Fossil Forest ===
The Fossil Forest of Dunarobba, 3 km from Farnetta, is one of the world's oldest forests. Two million years ago, the oceans withdrew from the area, leaving an ancient lake, Tiberino. Water runoff from the emerging hills and mountains carried large quantities of sediments which, along with tectonic movements, covered the forest's giant trees and preserved them.

=== San Lorenzo in Nifili ===
The listed Church of San Lorenzo (10th century) is located in the parish territory of Farnetta (2 km from Farnetta). This is described as 'almost unique for its architectural heritage and level of preservation' owing to its stone barrel vault, which runs the length of the nave and medieval frescoes. The church has been constructed over a Roman temple and a significant amount of Roman stone blocks and artefacts have been reused for the construction of this church.

=== Nevi Family Historic Palace ===
This country mansion was built by the Nevi family, a wealthy family of landowners since the 15th century. The mansion has the typical structure of Umbrian country estates, with stables and cellars on the ground floor, a private chapel frescoed for the family priests, and a slightly fortified structure to protect against brigand raids that plagued these territories until the 19th century. The mansion was built in 1672, and a significant part of Farnetta's history has passed through its walls.

=== The Farnetto Oak Forest ===
In the immediate surroundings of Farnetta lie the vast Farnetto oak forests, unique in Umbria. This species of oak, known for its large leaves, grows slowly. In the past, it was a vital resource for the local population, who used its wood for heating and fed its acorns to pigs, giving the meat a rich and delicious flavor. Today, these protected and safeguarded woodlands are a popular destination for beautiful walks and bike rides.

== Culture ==
Farnetta is known for its Feast of St. Rita, held the last week of May. During the feast, local residents organize a trattoria with traditional food.

In the nearby medieval church of S. Lorenzo (st. Lawrence), on the 10th of August, every year, a historic religious feast is celebrated with local food and wine.

Other medieval towns and villages are present near Farnetta: Todi (17 km), Sangemini, (10 km), Spoleto (42 km), Carsulae (12 km) and Orvieto (38 km).

Located about 35 km from Farnetta are the famous Marmore Falls, one of the highest waterfalls in Europe, created by the Romans in the 2nd century BC.

== Transport ==
Farnetta is served by Bus Italia services to Terni (from the train station), Todi, Sangemini, Montecastrilli, Avigliano and Amelia.

== Economy ==
Agriculture was important for Farnetta's rural development and poverty reduction. Today the village has made use of its past and created a tourist industry; many people enjoy agriturismi (farm holidays) in the area.

== Demography ==
The population of the civil parish, recorded in the 2024 census, is 278. In the 13th century the population was about 500 (96 fireplaces).

== List of people from Farnetta ==
- Angelo Nevi, Prior of the Comune di Montecastrilli in the 19th century.
