= Santa Cecilia, Acquasparta =

Church in Acquasparta, Italy

Coordinates: 42.6903756°N 12.5464902°E

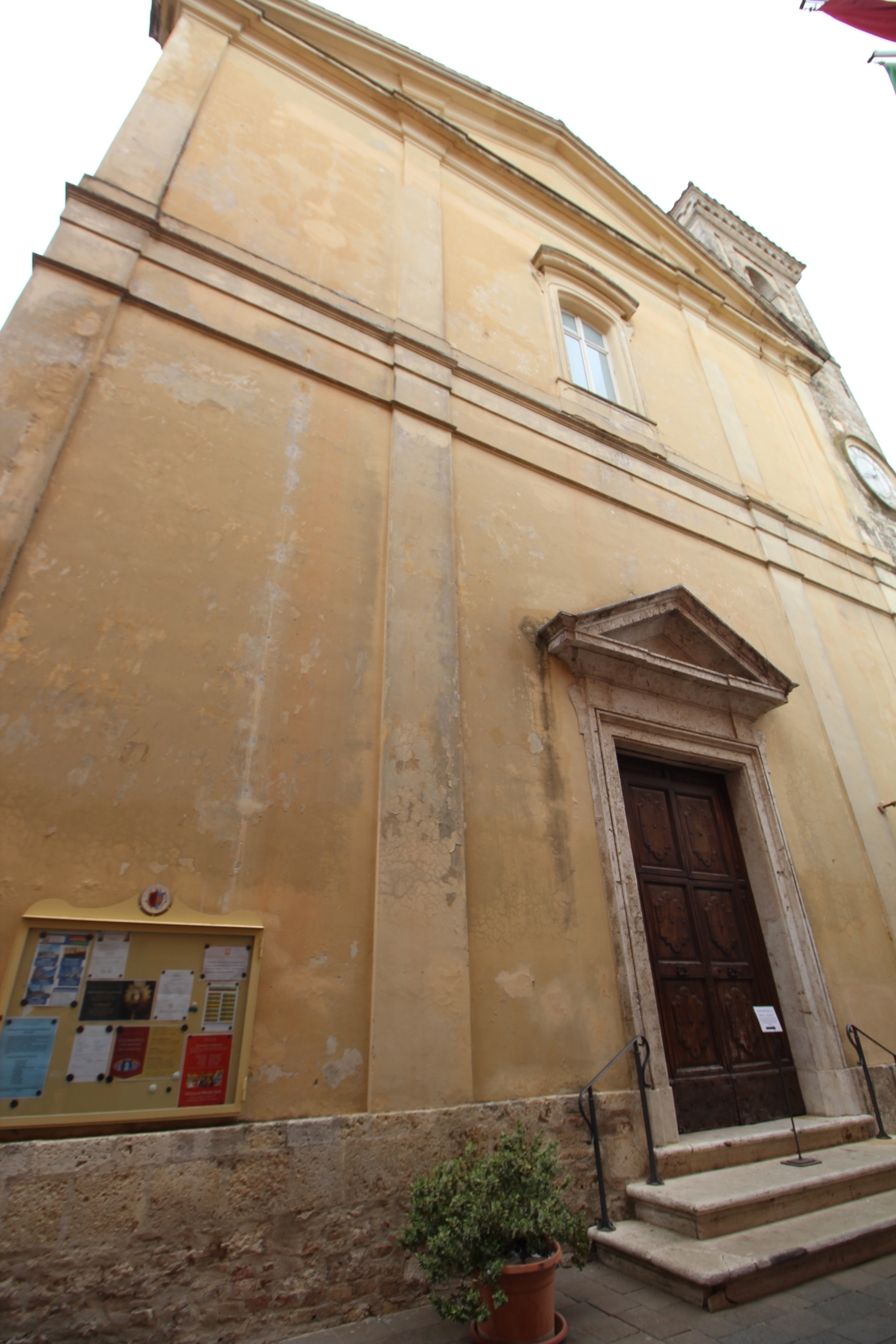
Facade of the church

Santa Cecilia is a Romanesque and Renaissance-style church and bell-tower located in Acquasparta, Province of Terni, region of Umbria, Italy.

The church was originally built in the 12th century, to honour Santa Cecilia, patron of the town. In 1581, the Cesi Chapel was commissioned by Isabella Liviani Cesi, great-grandmother of Federico Cesi, founder of the Accademia dei Lincei. The church was associated with a seminary, and the collegiata has seven paintings, from 16th to 18th centuries, at independent altars.
