= Terre Arnolfe =

Map of the region

The Terre Arnolfe (Arnolfian Lands) were a group of castles, villages, and territories located between Terni, Narni, and Spoleto, in Umbria. Their chief settlement was Cesi.

For several centuries, from the 11th century until the early 17th century, the Terre Arnolfe retained a distinct administrative identity under the Papal States, in memory of a previous political autonomy.

== History ==
The name derives from a nobleman called Arnolfo, remembered in charters of donation to the Monastery of Santa Maria di Farfa in Acuziano and to the Monastery of Monte Cassino. His descendants, the Arnolfi, were probably German counts subject to the dukes of Spoleto, and gave their name to the territory.

The earliest reference to the district appears in imperial documents. In 1014, during his journey to be crowned emperor in Rome, Henry II confirmed to Pope Benedict VIII the rights and privileges granted to the Church since the time of Charlemagne and the Ottonian dynasty. Among these was the donation of the Terre Arnolfe. In exchange, the papacy ceded to the emperor episcopal rights over Bamberg and Fulda. This act completed the earlier Ottonian donation of the Duchy of Spoleto to the papacy, begun by Otto I.

In 1093 and 1094, members of the Arnolfi donated lands and churches in the region to Farfa and Monte Cassino. According to Peter the Deacon in the Chronica Casinensis, Arnolfo donated half of the churches of Santa Maria and Sant'Angelo of Cesi to Monte Cassino during the abbacy of Oderisius, Count of Marsi, in 1083.

In the early 1260s, Pope Urban IV confronted the commune of Spoleto over its usurpation of the Terra Arnulforum. A papal enquiry in 1262 confirmed it as papal domain, usurped by Spoleto for about fourteen years. Urban rejected Spoleto’s evidence, ordered the land restored, and maintained pressure despite fines and failed negotiations. In 1264 the town was reconciled over other fortresses, but not the Terra Arnulforum. Under Clement IV in 1265 Spoleto finally submitted, leaving the territory under papal jurisdiction.

The papacy gradually consolidated control. In 1278, Rudolf I of Habsburg formally recognized the sovereignty of the Church over the Duchy of Spoleto and the Terre Arnolfe. A papal rector presided over the territory, though in the time of Frederick II the cardinal Raniero Capocci granted the Terre Arnolfe in perpetual vicariate to the people of Spoleto. This arrangement led to disputes between Spoleto and Terni over control of the lands.

Pope Alexander VI later annexed the Terre Arnolfe to the Apostolic Camera, while his son Cesare Borgia campaigned through Umbria, the Marche, and Romagna. In 1503, Pope Julius II revoked Alexander’s act and placed the Rocca of Cesi under direct papal authority. Subsequent decades saw alternating jurisdiction: in 1552, Cesi again submitted to Spoleto, confirmed by Pope Julius III. But in 1568, Pope Pius V restored direct papal administration through the clerics of the Camera, who sent an annual vicar to govern from Cesi.

The memory of the Terre Arnolfe as a distinct feudal-administrative unit gradually faded in the early 17th century.

== Status ==
The territory was already known in the 10th century as the terra Arnulforum. Papal bulls referred to the district with terms such as terra Arnulforum (in a bull of Pope Nicholas III, 1289) and terras specialis commissionis Arnulforum (under Pope Martin V, c. 1417).

Administratively the Terre Arnolfe were classed among the terras specialis commissionis, like the Sabina. This is confirmed by the titulature of Cardinal Giovanni Vitelleschi, who styled himself as legate to the terras specialis commissionis Arnulforum et Sabine.

As a terra specialis commissionis the district enjoyed a degree of autonomy. It was attached to the Patrimony of Saint Peter in Tuscia, but only by a form of personal union: it retained its own governor, who depended on the rector of the Patrimony resident in Viterbo. In the Terre Arnolfe the rector’s authority was exercised through a vicar general, while a vice-treasurer oversaw finances.

This arrangement was still in force under Pope Eugene IV. On 20 November 1431 the Liber officiorum records the appointment of Catarnio de Capatostis of Montemonaco as vicar of the Terre Arnolfe for a six-month term beginning 1 January 1432. Albornoz’s register also states explicitly that “in these places the Church exercises full jurisdiction.” Although the scarcity of documentation leaves some doubt whether feudal practices had been introduced during the Western Schism, contemporary sources such as the Historia liberationis civitatis Spoleti (1437–1439) suggest that papal authority remained direct.

The Terre Arnolfe remained under direct papal jurisdiction (merum et mixtum imperium), with no trace of feudal lords, according to contemporary accounts. The main exception was the town of Cesi, the principal stronghold of the district, which was contested by neighboring Terni. In 1431 the people of Terni occupied Cesi, until Pope Eugene IV ordered its restitution to his commissioners on 9 August 1431.

In November 1432 the Terre Arnolfe were grouped with Terni, Narni, and several surrounding districts into a special administrative circumscription (ex speciali commissione). This government was headed by Bartolomeo, abbot of San Proculo of Bologna, as governor general, with his seat at Terni. The arrangement reflected the strategic importance of the Nera valley and the Via Flaminia, which linked Rome to the northern provinces of the Papal States.

Regional rivalries repeatedly drew the Terre Arnolfe into disputes among their neighbors. Terni, Narni, and Rieti contested frontiers and sought to extend their territories; in particular, Terni attempted expansion into the Arnolfe district during the 15th century.

== Boundaries ==
A 1364 document from the register of Cardinal Albornoz precisely describes its extent at the time: the districts of Cesi, Portaria, Macereno, Castiglione, and Gallicitoli (later known as Firenzuola), bordered by the territories of Terni, Spoleto, Todi, and Amelia.

According to historian Renzo Nobili, the original imperial grant to Count Arnulf had also included Massa Martana, Acquasparta, Montecastrilli and San Gemini. From the early 13th century this western section of the Terra Arnulforum was progressively fragmented, as its main castles became targets of neighbouring communes seeking territorial expansion.

The boundaries of the Terre Arnolfe and of the Patrimonial State of the Roman Church were formally defined by special commission in 1373, under Pope Gregory XI. The survey was carried out by Bernardo Provenzano, castellan of the Rocca di Cesi.

=== List of settlements ===
Besides Cesi, the following localities were included in the Terre Arnolfe, with their approximate hearth (fuochi) counts, or later jurisdictions:

- Porcaria (80 hearths), possessed by the Duke of Acquasparta
- Macerino (75 hearths), in the mountain, governed by clerics of the Apostolic Camera
- Porzano (38 hearths), in the mountain
- Collecampo (16 hearths)
- Cisterna (8 hearths)
- Firenzuola (Acquasparta) (20 hearths)
- Scoppio (18 hearths)
- Valle Perachia, including the hamlets of Appecano, Poggio Lavarino, and Acqua Palombo, under the Apostolic Camera
- Messanano (10 hearths)
- Fogliano (25 hearths)
- Rapicciano (7 hearths)
- Palazzo (2 families)
- Arezzo (5 hearths)
- Ponte di Cordigliano
- Mogliano
- Builano (three mills)
- Mantiella
- Villa Balduino
- Strepeto Castelletto
- Appollenaco (or Polenaco Villa)
- Acqua Palombo Castelletto
- Castiglione (ruined)
- Poggio Azzavano (ruined)

Additional sites recorded in a bull of Pope Alexander VI (1276) as subject to the Castellan of Cesi and the Terre Arnolfe included:

- Villa di Esolito (today the church of San Giacomo)
- Villa San Manni
- Villa d’Izano
- Terzaria della Villa di San Severo
- Villa di Panaria
- Villa di Magnavacca
- Monte Martano
- Murice Contrada
- Perocle Rocca
