= Santa Maria di Ciciliano, Montecastrilli =

Church in Montecastrilli, Italy

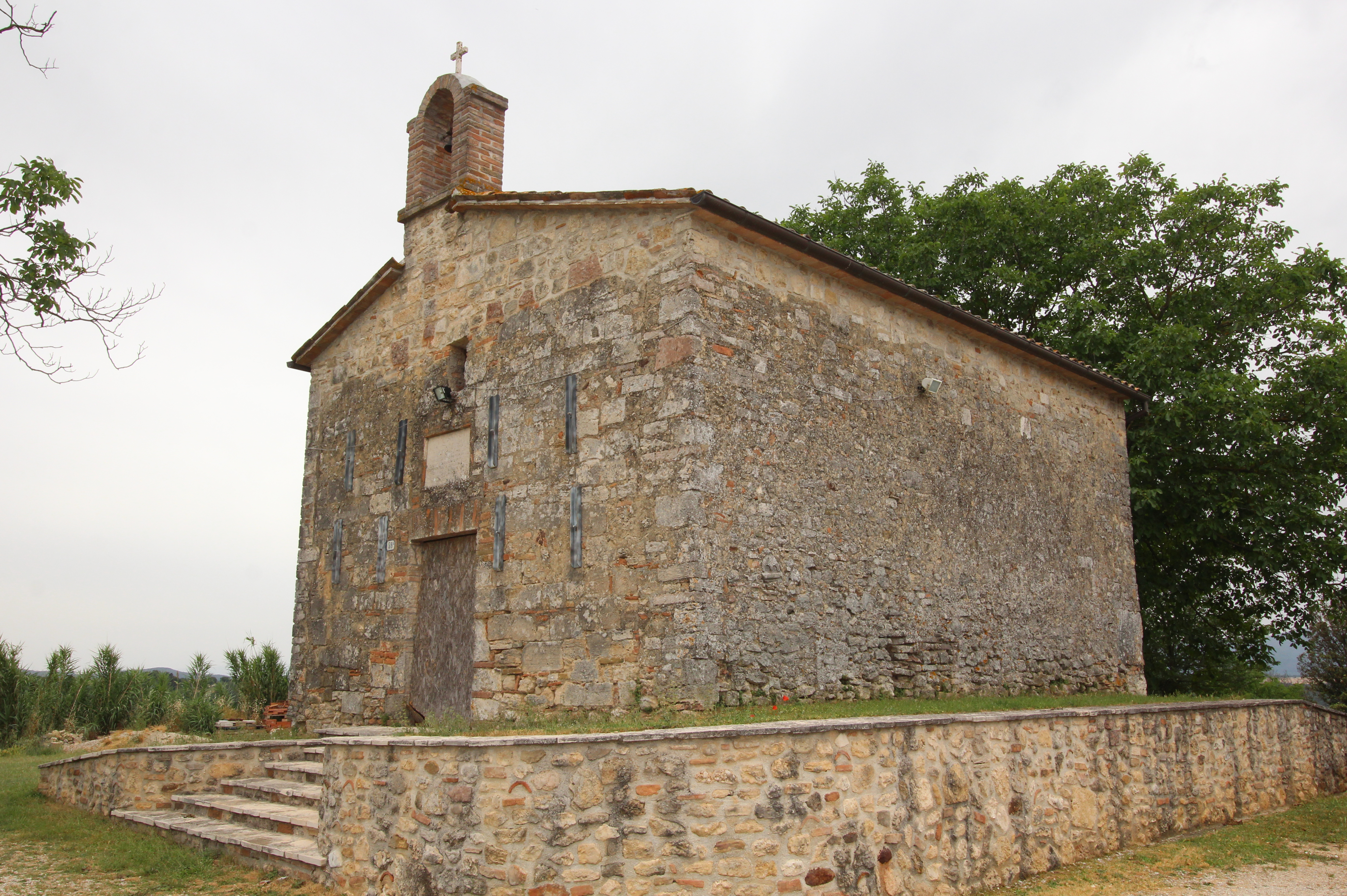
The church of Santa Maria di Ciciliano in Montecastrilli

San Maria di Ciciliano is a Roman Catholic church located in the town of Montecastrilli, in the province of Terni, region of Umbria, Italy.

== History ==
A church was present at the site by the 11th century and located within the castle of Cicigliano. It was once dependant to the Abbey of Farfa. It was transferred to an order of nuns in 1779.
