= San Lorenzo in Nifili =

Church a Farnetta, Italy

Coordinates: 42°39′03″N 12°28′00″E

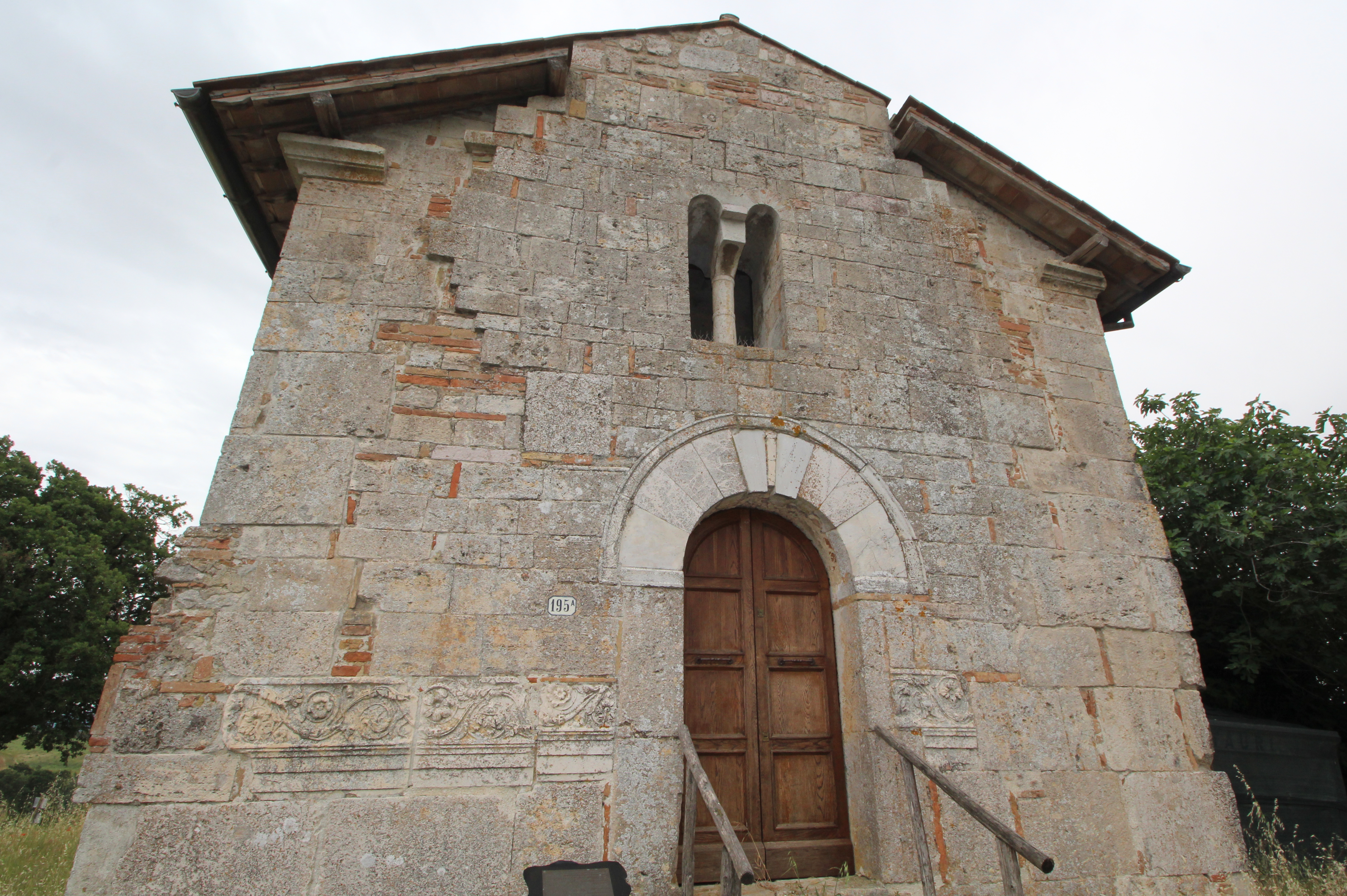
The church of San Lorenzo in Nifili

San Lorenzo in Nifili is a Romanesque-style, Roman Catholic church located near the village of Farnetta, part of the commune of Montecastrilli, in the province of Terni, region of Umbria, Italy.

== History ==
This church is isolated in the Umbrian countryside and it was constructed here because an important route connecting Amelia to Todi and Carsulae passed in front of the Church since Roman times. The church is documented since 1112, when it was donated by the Count Rapizzo degli Arnolfi to the Abbey of Farfa. The church incorporates spolia from an ancient Roman construction. In medieval times, a small community of monks lived in the building adjacent to the Church, while the arable fields around it were rented to the noble families of Todi. The importance of the route passing in front of the church reduced with time, and the monastic community was replaced by families of farmers. In 1777, it became part of the parish of Farnetta together with its fields (65 hectares). The ownership of the church and the arable fields passed in 1986 from the parish of Farnetta to the diocese of Orvieto-Todi. An oil painting from the 17th century, now in the church of Farnetta, showing the martyrdom of St. Laurence, was placed on the main altar. The church has some interesting frescoes from the 15th century. Of particular interest is the travertine altar, made with Roman stone, where it can be read the inscription "A. D. M" (Anno Domini Mille, year 1,000). Every year, on the 10th of August, st. Laurence day, the local community of Farnetta and Montecastrilli celebrates the saint with a religious mass, typical food and wine.
