= Madonna del Giglio, Acquasparta =

Church building in Acquasparta, Italy

Coordinates: 42.69006°N 12.54554°E

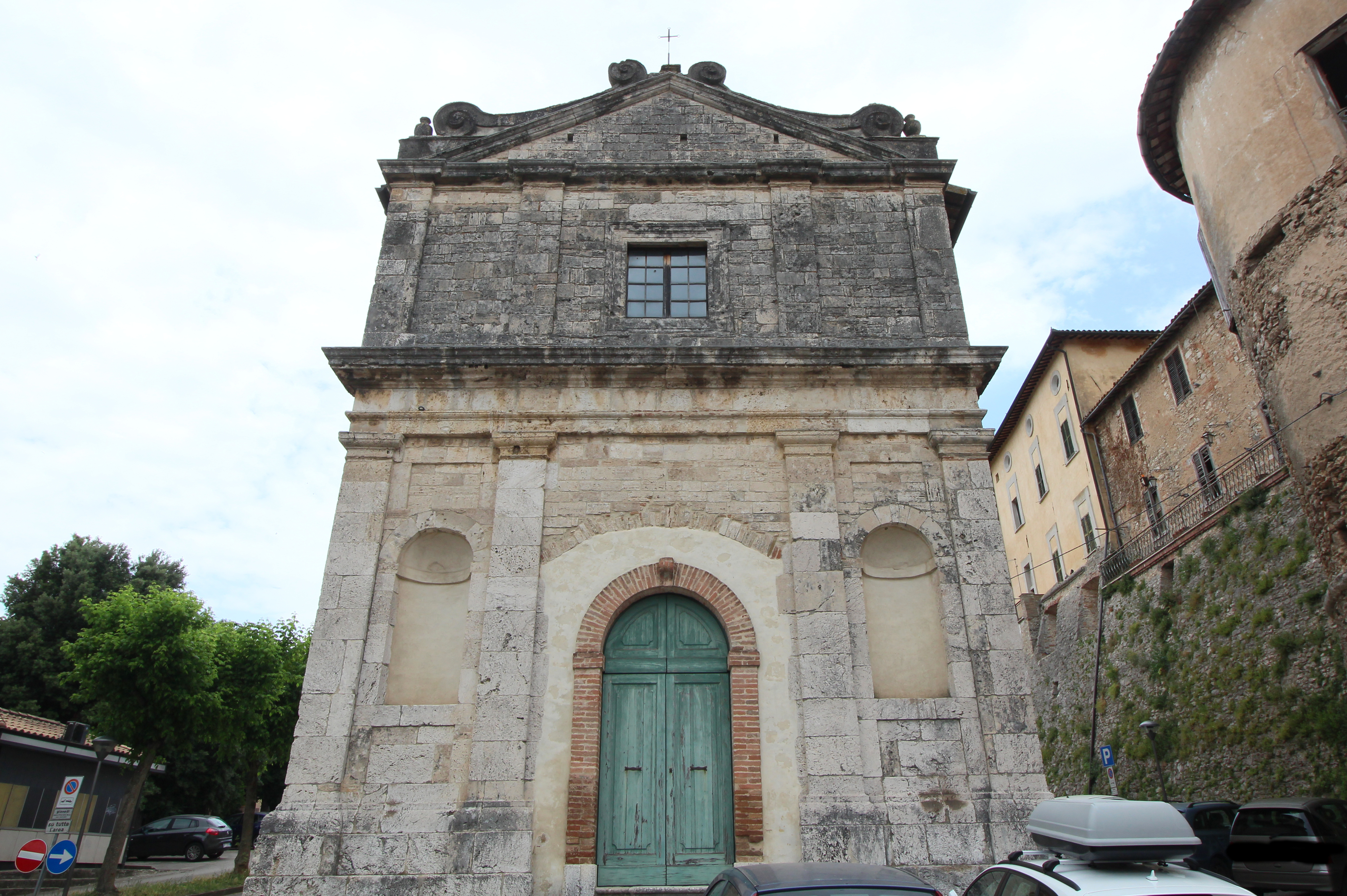
Facade of the church

The church of the Madonna del Giglio is a Roman Catholic church located in Acquasparta, Province of Terni, region of Umbria, Italy.

The stone church dates to the 1600s and houses a number of contemporary frescoes.
