= Rocchetta di Cesi =

Medieval fortification in Italy

Coordinates: 42.611835°N 12.588335°E

Tower of the Rocchetta di Cesi, photographed in 1910

Rocchetta di Cesi (also known as the Rocca di Cesi) is a medieval fortification located on Monte Eolo (also called Monte Sant’Erasmo), near Cesi in Umbria, Italy. The site overlooks the Terni basin and the surrounding Apennine chain.

During the Middle Ages the Rocca di Cesi also served as the seat of the castellan (rector or governor), who was appointed by the Pope and held jurisdiction over the Terre Arnolfe. Its strategic importance was such that it was contested between Terni, Todi, and Spoleto.

== History ==
The fortress was probably erected in the 11th century on a site that had been fortified since antiquity.

In documents of the 11th century the site appears under the name Civitella. Around 1052 Albertus and Arnulfus donated the church of San Salvatore at Civitella, “on the mountain above Cesi,” to Montecassino Abbey. In 1093 the sons of Arnulf confirmed and expanded these donations, mentioning a monastery at Civitella. Modern scholarship identifies this site with the present Rocchetta di Cesi.

During the conflict between Frederick Barbarossa and the Papacy, the Rocca di Cesi was occupied in 1177 by imperial forces. In 1198 Conrad I, Duke of Spoleto and Count of Assisi, was compelled by Pope Innocent III to return it to the Apostolic See. The fortress was thereafter guarded as one of the key papal strongholds in Umbria.

A bull of Gregory IX in 1235 confirmed the Rocca di Cesi among the fortresses that could not be alienated from papal control. During the pontificate of Urban IV the fortress was maintained through revenues assigned from local churches, including San Benedetto di Calcaria and Sant’Erasmo, although these were later restored to Montecassino by Clement IV.

In 1276 the castellan was Fra Giovanni, a Hospitaller knight, who also held the rectorship of the Terre Arnolfe and the abbey of Ferentillo. Local communities swore fealty to him as the papal representative.

Under Nicholas III the castellany was again entrusted to a Hospitaller, Zampo, who received oaths of obedience and taxation from nearby villages. By the 13th century, the church of Sant’Erasmo, situated near the Rocchetta, had replaced San Salvatore as the main ecclesiastical foundation of the area.

Imperial diplomas continued to confirm papal possession: in 1312 Henry VII granted the fortress of Cesi with the Terre Arnolfe to Clement V; the act was renewed by Louis IV in 1336 and by Charles IV in 1368.

In the early 14th century, during the pontificate of John XXII, the Rocca di Cesi was taken from the sons of Andrea Cesi, who had held it as vicars of the Terra Arnolfa. It was recovered for the Church by Bishop Guido Farnese and entrusted to a custodian named Matteo. Shortly afterwards, the fortress passed under the control of Todi, whose authorities obtained its delivery for 200 florins, and placed it under close municipal supervision.

During the same period the Rocca di Cesi was the subject of turmoil during the rectorship of Guido Farnese. He leased the fortress, along with the other Terre Arnolfe, to Giacomo di Baschi. Giacomo soon seized the Rocca for himself, expelling his partner, refusing to pay rent, and using it as a base for raids. Contemporary accusations claimed he bribed the papal custodians and that even Guido may have profited from the betrayal. Although urged by Pope John XXII to retake the stronghold, Guido took no action.

The Rocca was recovered in 1323 by the new rector Roberto d’Albarupe, aided by the people of Cesi and by the Todi militia. The traitorous cleric Filippo Lippi was killed by the townspeople during the uprising. To secure the fortress against future rebellions, Pope John XXII incorporated the nearby church of Sant’Erasmo into the papal Camera patrimoniale, linking its revenues to the defense of the Rocca.

On 22 December 1494, during the Italian campaign of Charles VIII of France, soldiers from Terni allied with French companies assaulted and captured the Rocca di Cesi. The fortress was partly ruined and damaged in the attack, while the surrounding settlement was looted and devastated.

In 1501 Pope Alexander VI, responding to the damage caused in the Terre Arnolfe by conflicts between Terni and Spoleto, entrusted the Rocca and its territory to the Apostolic Camera. His successor Julius II revoked this arrangement in 1503, reasserting direct papal authority.

By the 16th century, as fortifications lost their defensive role for Cesi and Monte Sant’Erasmo, the Rocca and its walls gradually fell into disuse. In the 17th century the historian Felice Contelori described the Rocca as already "half ruined". In the mid-19th century Gaetano Moroni also reported that the Rocca was "almost leveled to the ground".

== Architecture ==
The fortifications of Cesi are considered a notable example of medieval military engineering. They consist of the Rocca and a series of towers arranged along a curtain wall that runs east–west between 787 and 660 meters above sea level. Built on the rocky spur of Monte Eolo, the defensive system exploited the natural characteristics of the terrain to create a stronghold considered virtually impregnable.

At least two towers dating from the 11th century, reinforced in the 13th century, are still visible along the ridge. A pentagonal tower functioned as the mastio (keep) of the fortress. These towers, connected by crenellated walls descending along the ridge of Monte Sant’Erasmo, formed a defensive system that allowed the Rocca di Cesi to dominate and control the surrounding Terre Arnolfe.

== Conservation ==
The fortification is publicly owned and falls under tutela ope legis (legal protection). Its state of conservation is classified as very poor.

A restoration campaign completed in 2025 consolidated the medieval towers and curtain walls, long at risk of collapse. The project also reopened the historic sentiero delle torri (trail 674), which links the Rocca, the towers, and the area of Sant’Erasmo, providing access to the defensive structures and panoramic views of the Terni valley.
