= Portaria, Umbria =

Coordinates: 42.65655°N 12.56612°E

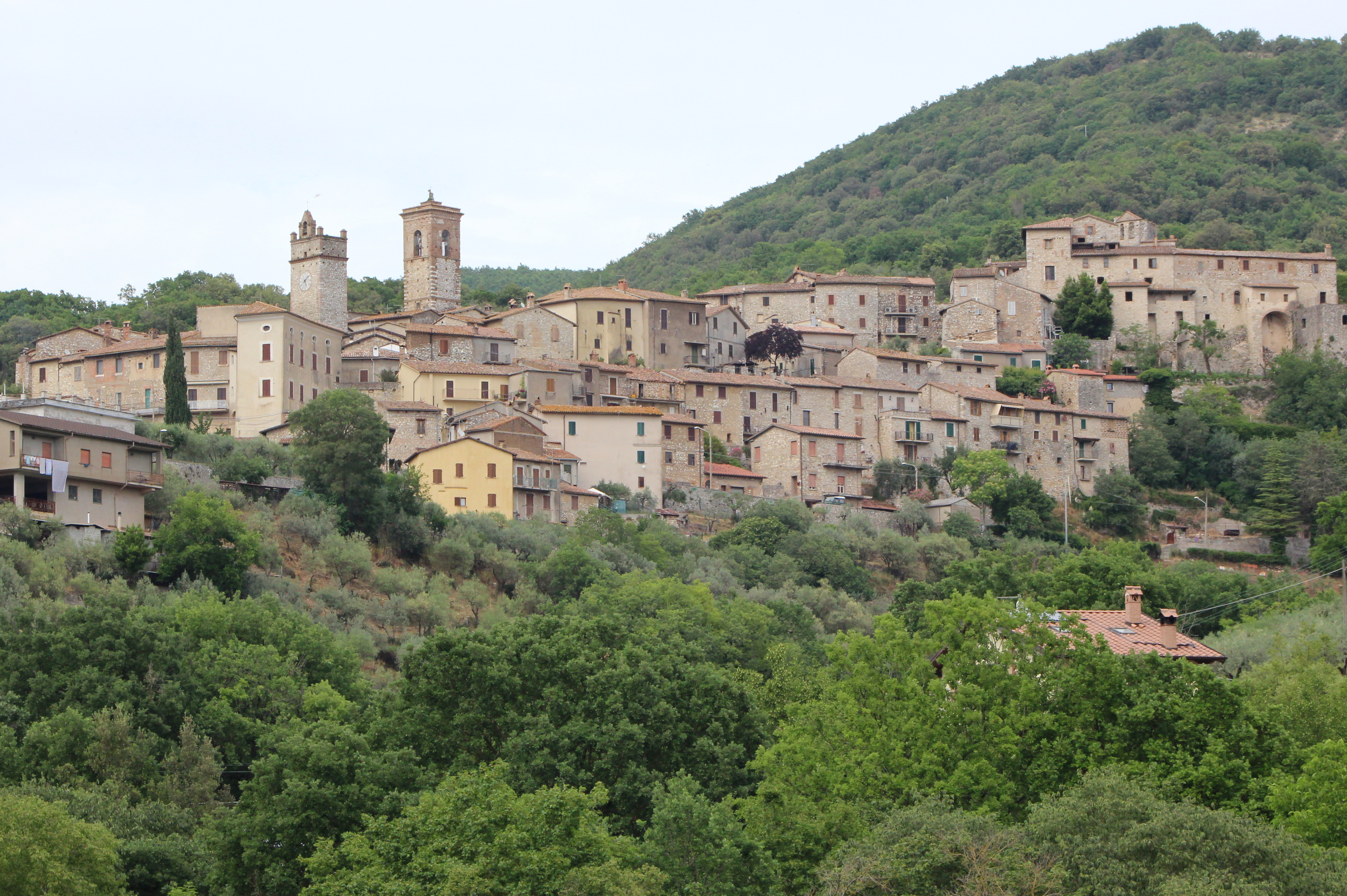
View of Portaria and the surrounding valley

Portaria (historically Porcaria) is a hill settlement in Umbria, today a frazione of Acquasparta, situated at 470 metres (1,540 ft) above sea level, overlooking the valley of the Naia stream.

Documented from the Middle Ages as part of the Terre Arnolfe, it belonged to the Roman Catholic Church and subsequently entered the lordship of the Cesi family. Suppressed as an independent municipality in 1875, it later became part of Acquasparta in 1929.

The town preserves medieval structures, the 11th-century church of San Filippo e Giacomo, and the nearby Franciscan hermitage historically associated with it.

As of the 2021 census, Portaria had a population of 89, with a further 124 residents living in the surrounding countryside. (Note: Population data from the 2021 census: Municipality code 55001 – Acquasparta, census section 20 (Portaria): population 89.; Municipality code 55001 – Acquasparta, census section 78 (case sparse): population 124.) (Note: To obtain the data from the website: 1. Select "Basi Territoriali 2021: Confini amministrativi, Località, Sezioni di censimento, Aree SubCom".; 2. Use the search function to find the desired place.; 3. Click the Attribute Table icon in the top-right corner.; 4. In the panel that appears at the bottom of the page, select "Sezioni 2021".)

== Etymology ==
Portaria derives from the form Porcaria. The name indicates a place where, in addition to pigs, swineherds (porcari) and chief swineherds (arci porcari) resided. The chief swineherds oversaw the swineherds, the pigs, and the wooded areas. The form Portaria represents a later and erroneous pronunciation of Porcaria.

== History ==
=== Medieval period ===
Portaria formed part of the feudal lands of the Arnolfi family, a powerful lineage traditionally linked to an Arnolfo recorded in 932 in a confirmation of Otto the Great's donation to the Roman Church. The territory later became known as the Terre Arnolfe.

In 1093, members of the Arnolfi family donated half of the parish (pieve) of Cesi and other properties located in the court of Portaria to the monastery of Montecassino. At that time, the court and church of Portaria belonged to the diocese of Narni.

On 3 July 1232, the territory of Portaria became involved in a dispute with the city of Todi over the estate known as Arsicciali, situated within its district. Representatives of Todi took possession of the estate. In response, the communities of Portaria, San Gemini, and Poggio Azzano protested the occupation.

In the capitulations signed at Florence on 26 February 1420 between Braccio Fortebracci and Louis Aleman, bishop of Maguelonne and vice-camerlengo of Pope Martin V, Portaria was included among the territories left to Braccio for a term of three years.

=== Early modern era ===
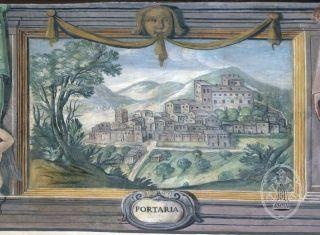
Portaria, 16th-century painted view by Matteo da Siena in the Palazzo Cesi-Gaddi, Rome

Around 1477, authorities of the Servite Order reformed the monastery of Santa Caterina apud Suinates in Portaria. The Prior General Cristoforo da Giustinopoli directed the reform by sending a nun from the monastery of the Trinity in Spoleto to Portaria as part of the process.

In April 1495, during conflicts involving Terni and Todi, Portaria placed itself under the protection of Spoleto in order to secure its defense. In May 1495, at the request of Bartolomeo d'Alviano and Paolo and Carlo Orsini, Spoleto sent three hundred infantry to Portaria. In early June 1495, enemies of the commune of Spoleto besieged Portaria, and Spoleto dispatched several hundred infantry to relieve it. The Spoletan forces lifted the siege, established a garrison in Portaria at the end of June, and in July 1495 appointed a commissioner to oversee its custody.

In August 1499, Lucrezia Borgia, sent by Pope Alexander VI as Governor of Spoleto, was received at the castle of Portaria by the Commissaries of the Commune of Spoleto. A lavish banquet was held there in her honor.

On 4 February 1540, the Apostolic Camera sold Portaria to Pier Luigi Farnese by instrument drawn up by the notary Nicolò Casolano. The sale fixed the price at 2,500 gold ducats of the Camera and stated that the Camera derived only about 25 florins of annual revenue from the locality. The transaction was carried out under Pope Paul III by the Camerlengo Guido Ascanio Sforza.

In 1540, Portaria passed into the lordship of the Cesi family as a result of the exchange carried out by Pier Luigi Farnese with Isabella Liviani, daughter of Bartolomeo d'Alviano and wife of Gian Giacomo Cesi.

In 1701, Porteria was a feudal domain of the Duke Cesi, a status which it retained in 1803. By 15 October 1816, it belonged to Duchess Marianna Massimi Cesi.

=== Modern era ===
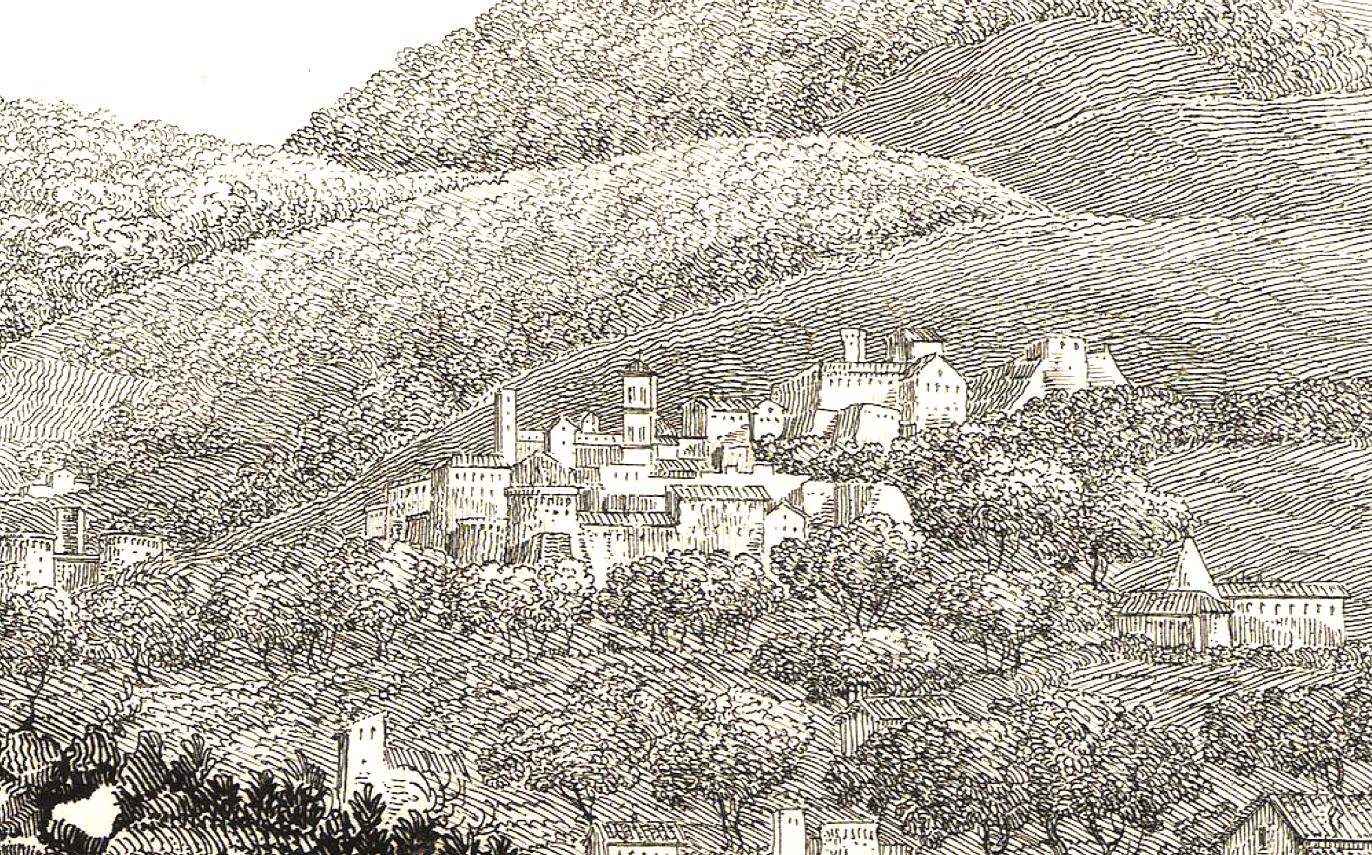
Portaria in an 1836 engraving by Luigi Rossini

In 1798, when the Papal States were invaded by French forces and the Roman Republic was proclaimed, Portaria was assigned to the Department of Clitunno in the canton of Narni.

In 1810, authorities instituted a girls' school connected with the Seminary of Spoleto. The establishment followed the suppression and liquidation of the monastery of Santa Caterina.

Records from 1829 describe its territory as extending across mountain, hill, and plain, with a total area of 545 Roman rubbia (1,007 hectares; 2,490 acres). The land yielded grain, acorns, and wine as its principal products. At that time, 385 inhabitants lived within a walled town that contained a substantial number of buildings in acceptable condition.

In 1873, the office of mayor was held by Biagio Palmerini. On 23 August 1875, a royal decree suppressed Portaria as a municipality and transferred its territory to Cesi.

In 1927, Portaria became a frazione of Terni, and in 1929 it passed to Acquasparta.

== Demographics ==
Historical population
| Year | Pop. | ±% p.a. |
|---|---|---|
| 1656 | 509 | — |
| 1708 | 532 | +0.09% |
| 1736 | 377 | −1.22% |
| 1782 | 443 | +0.35% |
| 1813 | 281 | −1.46% |
| 1853 | 481 | +1.35% |
| 1901 | 619 | +0.53% |
| 1951 | 271 | −1.64% |
| 2001 | 126 | −1.52% |
| 2021 | 89 | −1.72% |

Portaria's population has declined considerably over the centuries. In 1656 the town counted 509 inhabitants, rising slightly to 532 by 1708. A marked decline followed, with the population falling to 281 in 1813. Numbers recovered during the 19th century, reaching 481 in 1853, and rising to 619 in 1901.

The 20th century saw sustained depopulation. By 1951 the population had dropped to 271, and the downward trend continued to 126 residents in 2001 and 89 in 2021, reflecting a broader pattern of rural demographic decline.

== Geography ==
Portaria stands at 470 metres (1,540 ft) above sea level and overlooks the valley of the Naia stream. The settlement lies along the Via Flaminia on the stretch between Carsulae and Spoleto.

== Religion ==
=== Church of San Filippo e Giacomo ===
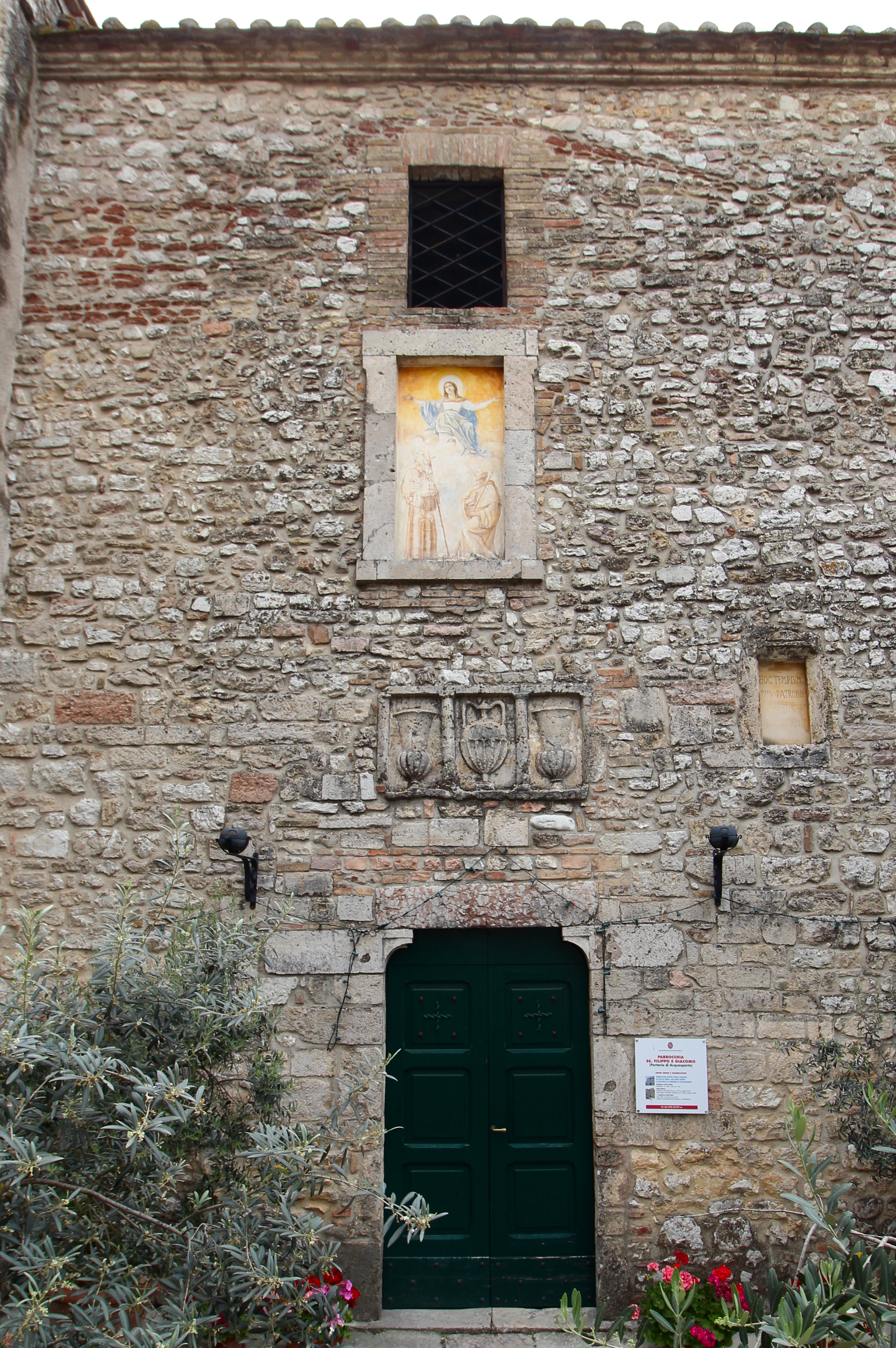
Façade of San Filippo e Giacomo, with aedicule and reused spolia

The Church of San Filippo e Giacomo, dedicated to the patron saints Philip and James, was built in the 11th century. Its construction reused spolia from the Roman site of Carsulae.

The medieval structure stands on a small square and retains a stone-framed aedicule on the façade. The building underwent restoration in the 20th century. Set within a stone frame on the façade is a fresco, probably depicting the Madonna with Saint Philip and Saint James and datable to the 15th or 16th century. The painting is in poor condition.

The church preserves an organ built in 1796 by Aldobrando Fedeli.

=== Hermitage ===
Portaria was closely associated with the Franciscan hermitage situated above the town. On 18 August 1333 its representatives attended the parliament held there, when ser Grazia da Bologna assumed office as papal vicar of the Terre Arnolfe. The town formed part of the network of castles summoned to the assembly recorded in the vice-treasurer's register.

In 1350 a papal letter granted permission to reside at the Hermitage of Portaria in order to observe the Franciscan Rule in its original form, but this authorization was revoked in 1355. A brief of Pope Gregory XI dated 28 July 1373 listed the hermitage as "l'Eremita vicino a Portaria" and "Eremita apud Portariam" among the convents associated with Saint Francis. The site lay at the edge of Portaria's territory, near the boundary with Poggio Azzano.

The inhabitants maintained regular contact with the religious community and, during periods of heavy snowfall, supplied food and cleared the roads to secure access. Local tradition holds that signals lit from the rocky height above prompted assistance from the town below.

In 1446, the Franciscan preacher Roberto Caracciolo is recorded as having stayed at the Hermitage of Portaria.

== Monuments and historic structures ==
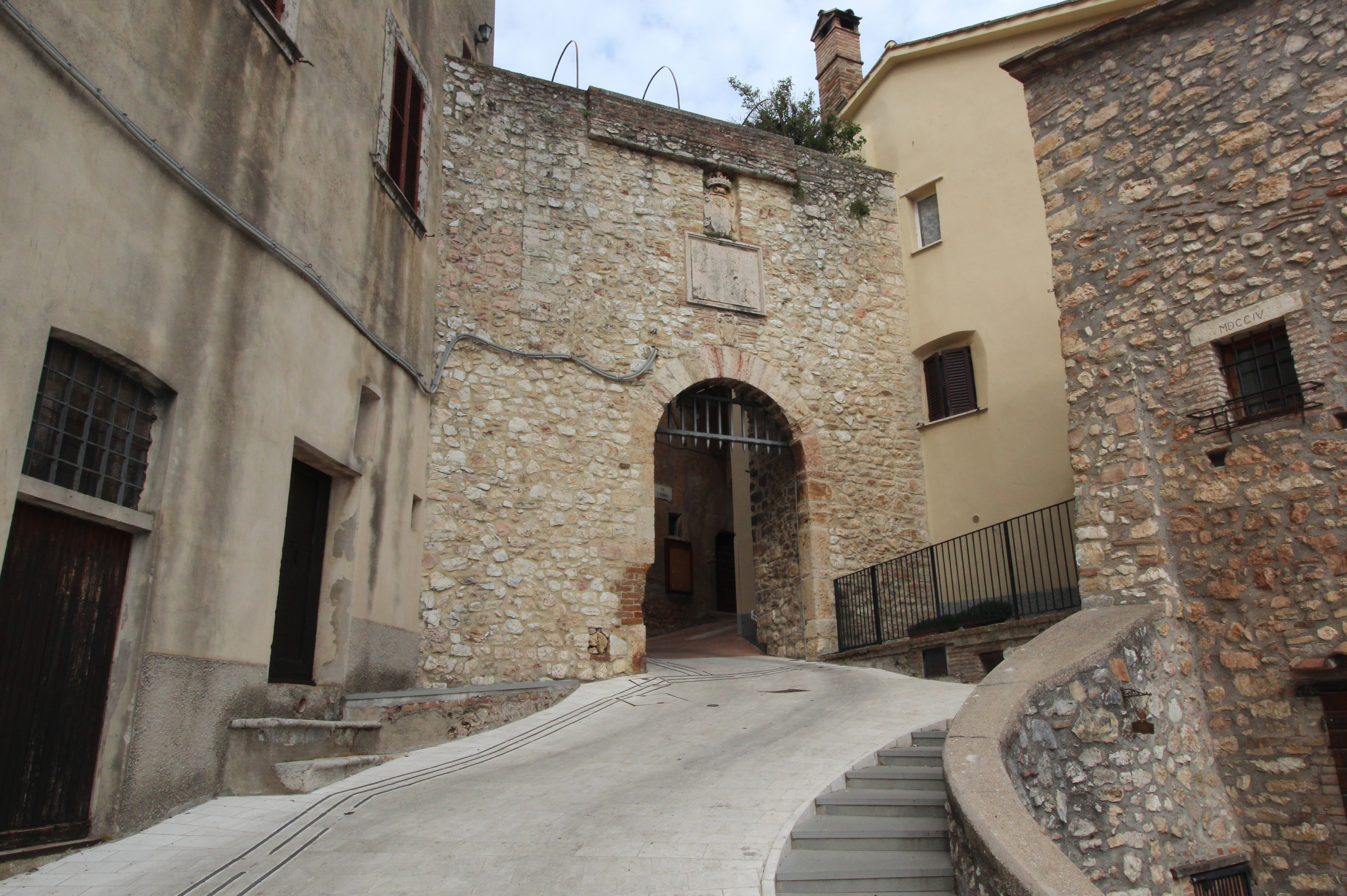
Porta Romana, with stone arch and inscription above the entrance

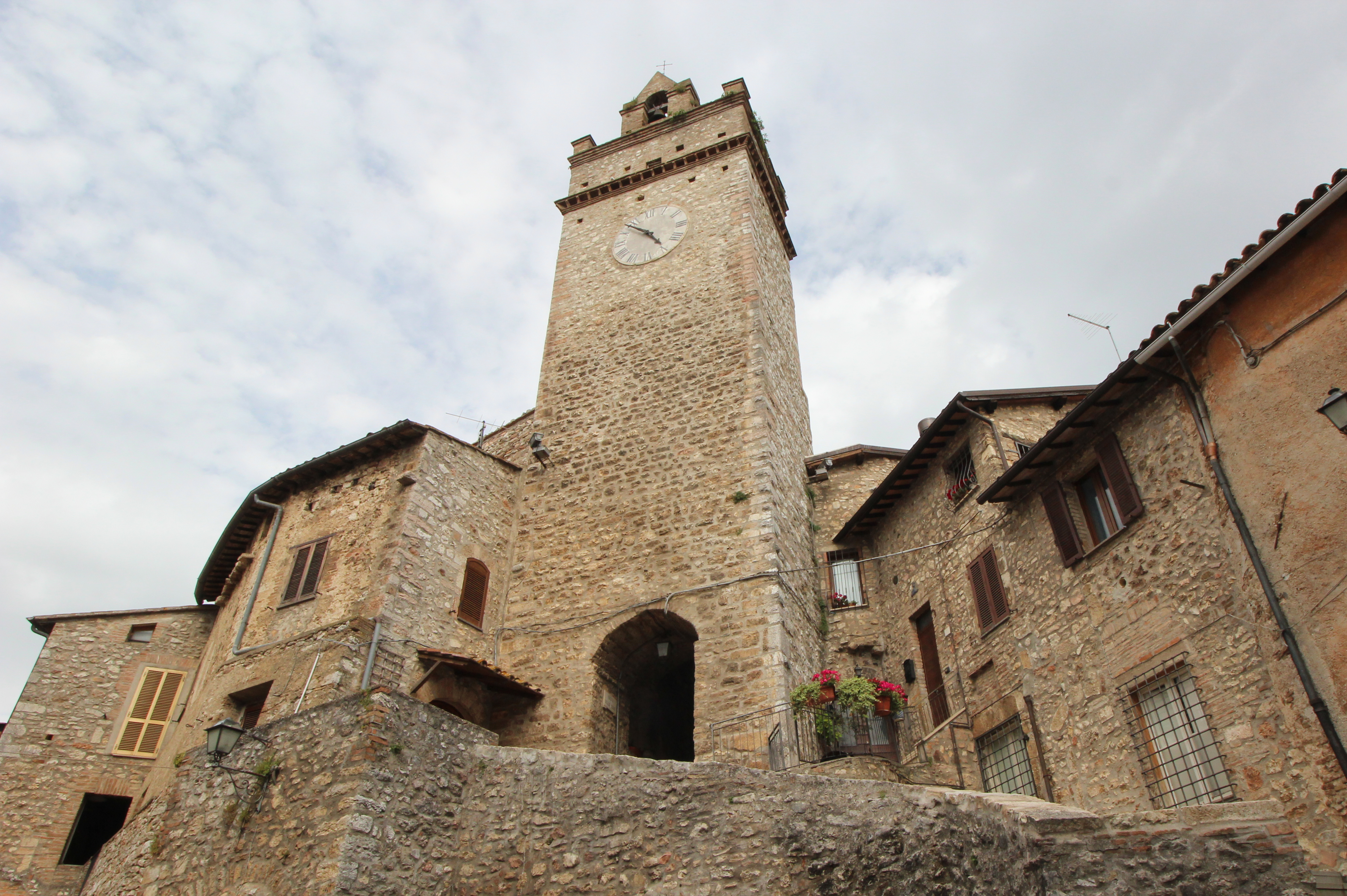
Medieval clock tower and arched gateway

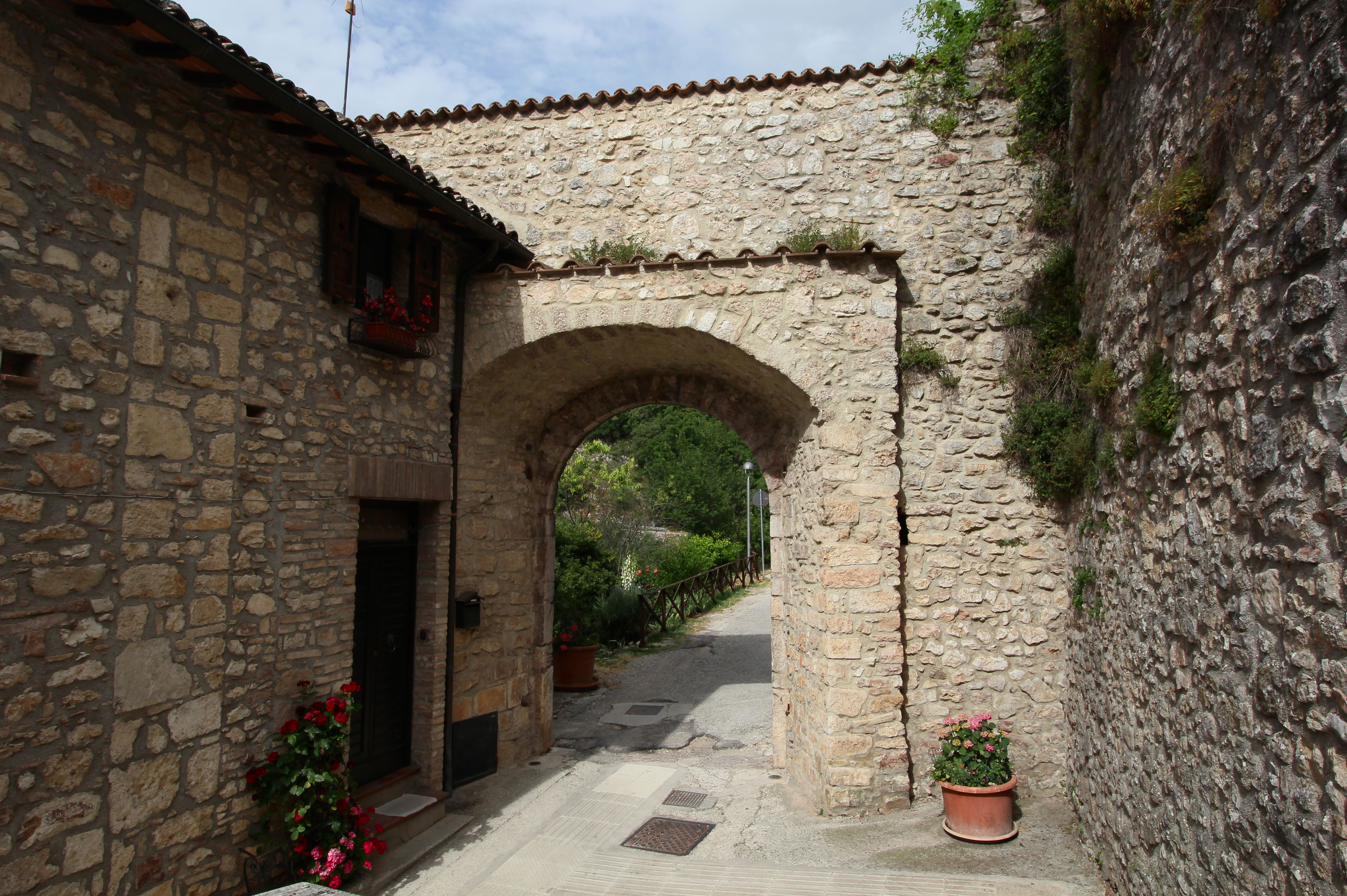
Porta Spoletina, opening toward the road to Spoleto

=== Porta Romana ===
The Porta Romana marks one of the historic entrances to the town. Above the gate appears the coat of arms of the Cesi family, recalling the acquisition of Portaria by Gian Giacomo Cesi in 1540, when Pier Luigi Farnese ceded it in exchange for the castle of Alviano.

=== Torre dell'Orologio ===
At the centre of the town lies a small medieval square dominated by the Torre dell'Orologio. The tower was erected in the 13th century and altered in the 17th century. The square also preserves a Renaissance well.

=== Porta Spoletina ===
The Porta Spoletina forms the opposite gate of the fortified settlement and historically served as the exit toward Spoleto.

=== Postal box of 1674 ===
Portaria preserves a plaque marking the site of a mailbox dated 1674, identified as the first in Italy. The original, larger plaque was removed and is preserved at the Ministry of Posts and Telecommunications in Rome. A replacement plaque remains visible in Portaria.
