= San Giovanni de Butris, Acquasparta =

San Giovanni de Butris
- Chiesa di San Giovanni de Butris
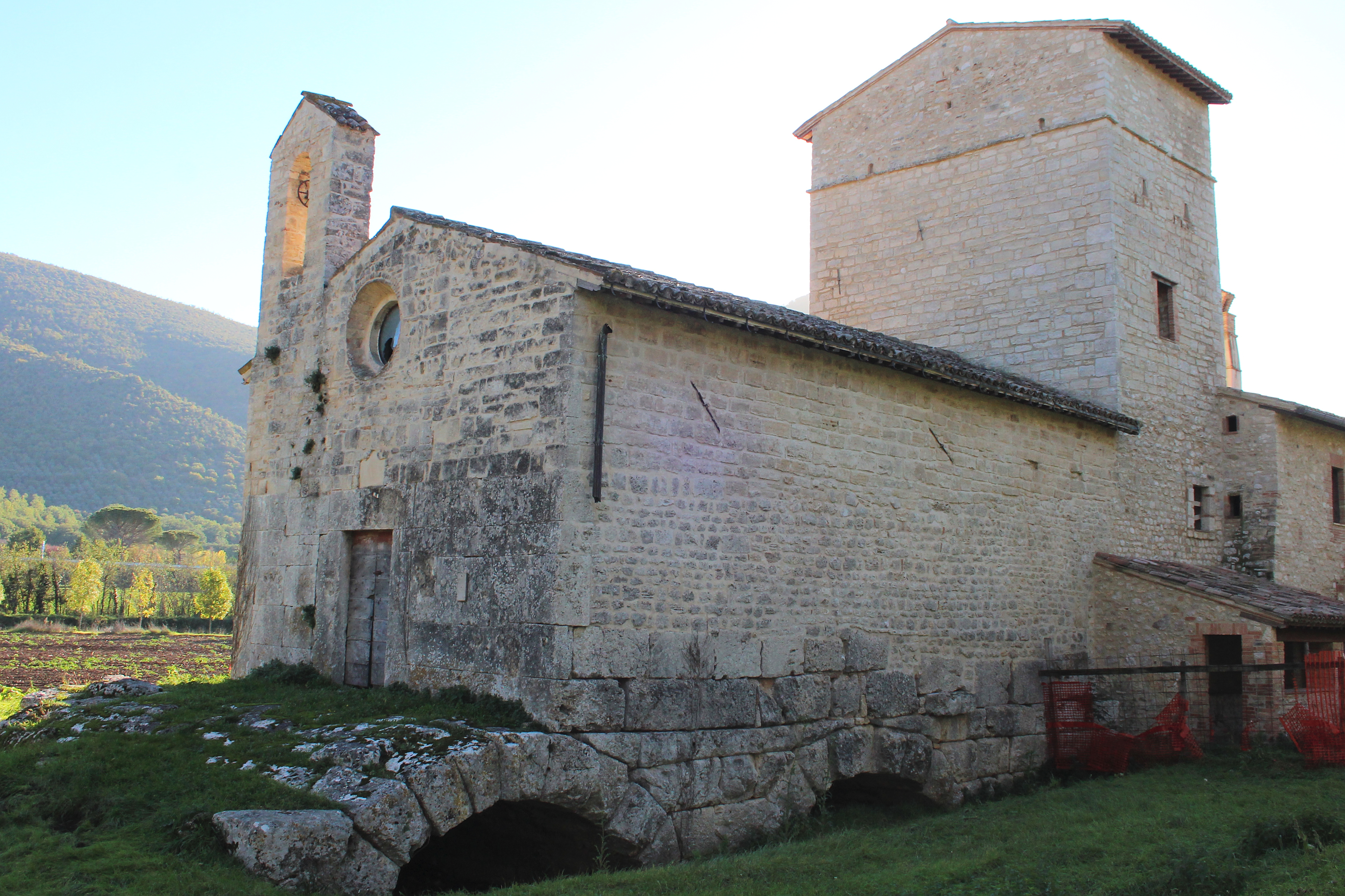
- San Giovanni de Butris
- 42°40′48.3774″N 12°33′3.7332″E
- Country: Italy
- Denomination: Roman Catholic

San Giovanni de Butris is a Romanesque-style, Roman Catholic stone church located outside of the town of Acquasparta, on the former via Flaminia, in the Province of Terni, region of Umbria, Italy.

The stone church was initially built over the structure of an Ancient Roman bridge, which forms the visible base of the structure. It was initially dedicated to San Giovanni Battista, and once belonged to the Knights of Malta.
