= Cesi, Terni =

Town in Umbria, Italy

Coordinates: 42°36′39″N 12°35′04″E

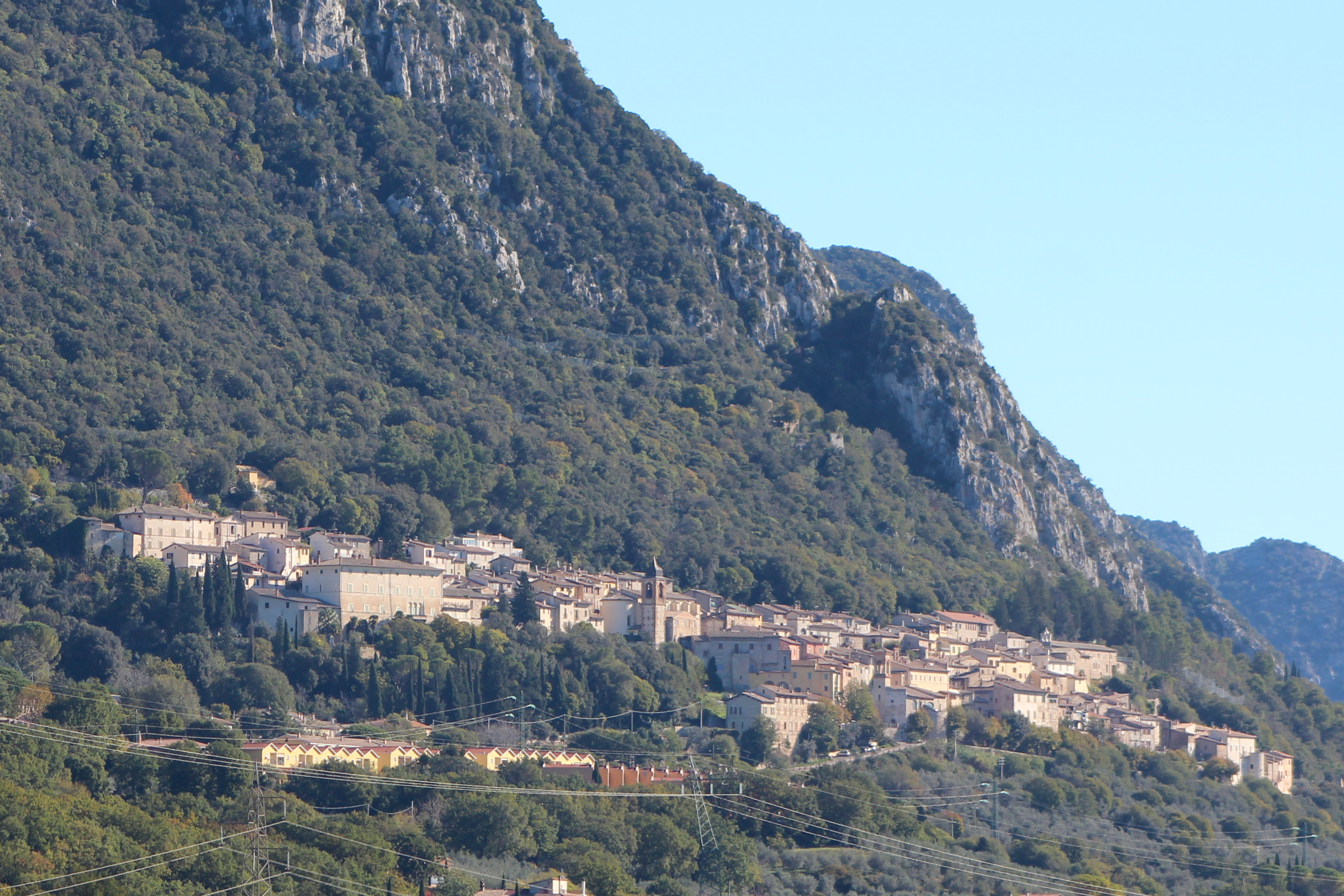
Panorama of Cesi

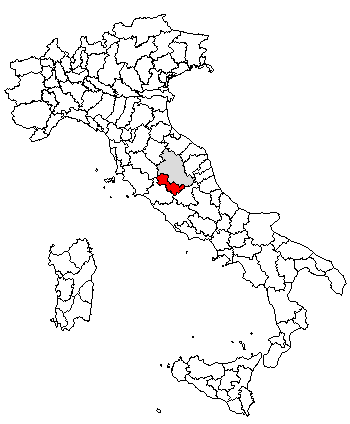
Location of the province of Terni

Cesi is a frazione of the Italian comune of Terni, in the province of Terni, southern Umbria, Italy. The small borgo, which retains its late-medieval aspect, set among olive groves, lies "stretched out lengthwise along a narrow contour on the slopes of M. Torre Maggiore," about 18 km north of Terni at an altitude of 437 m, one of the southernmost peaks of the Monti Martani. As of 2001 there were 682 residents.

== History ==
Testaments to the likely Umbrian origin of the site of Clusiolum are remains of walling slightly below the present village. Above it, near the peak of the Torre Maggiore (1121 m.) are the remains of an Italic religious complex dating to the sixth century BCE, brought to light by an excavation.

The name Cesi derives from Late Latin caesa, a place cleared of woodland.

In the Middle Ages Cesi was a fief of the Arnolfi, the chief seat of the Terre Arnolfe. The family claimed descent from the Lombard Arnulf, who established himself in the region. The noble family of Cesi, dukes of Aquasparta, derive their name from this place. Of this family was Federico Cesi, founder of the Accademia dei Lincei, Rome.

During 10–14 July 1849, Garibaldi encamped here, on his retreat from Rome after the fall of the revived Roman Republic.

== Places of interest ==
- At San Erasmo above the village there is an astronomical observatory.
- Church of S. Michele Arcangelo (1080), a Romanesque church partly rebuilt in the thirteenth century with four pointed arches supporting its roof, now the site of the annual concerts of the Settembre musicale cesano.
- Palazzo Contelori, former seat of the suppressed commune now joined to Terni; it was partly rebuilt in the seventeenth century.
- Church of S. Andrea (1160), with fragments of carved funeral reliefs from Roman Carsulae embedded in the façade; the entrance is through a door in the long side; there is a second, smaller, porta del morto through which coffins were carried not to bring ill-omen on the usual entrance. Palazzo Cesi faces the church.
- Parish church of S. Maria Assunta (sixteenth-seventeenth centuries); altarpiece of Madonna and Child with Saints (dated 1308) by the anonymous Master of Cesi, and a detached fresco Madonna and Child by Tommaso Papacello da Cortona (1538).
- Palazzo Cittadini-Cesi (sixteenth century);
- Medieval city walls and watchtowers.
- Umbrian archways (sixth-fifth centuries BCE)
- The little Church (Chiesetta) of S. Erasmo, in Romanesque style; it was founded by the Benedictines in the twelfth century.
- Palazzo Stocchi, from which there is access to the grotta Eolia.
- Palazzo Eustachi.
- Church of Sant'Onofrio.
- Rocchetta di Cesi, a medieval fortification located on Monte Eolo (also called Monte Sant'Erasmo).
