= Acquasparta =

- Comune
- Comune di Acquasparta
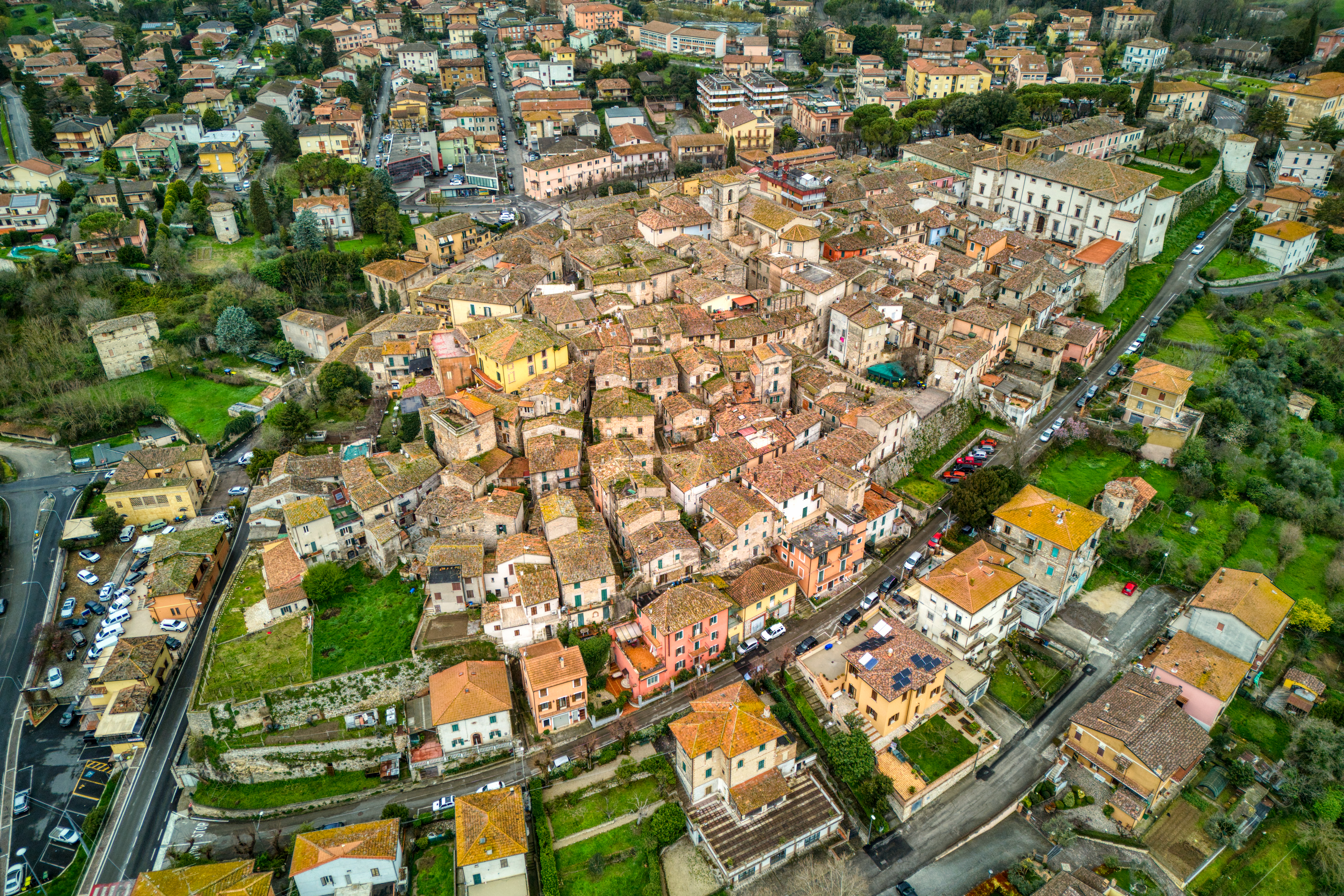
- View of Acquasparta

- Location of Acquasparta in Italy Acquasparta (Umbria)
- Coordinates: 42.690386°N 12.546223°E
- Country: Italy
- Region: Umbria
- Province: Terni (TR)

Government
  - Mayor: Giovanni Montani

Area
  - Total: 79 km^{2} (31 sq mi)
- Elevation: 320 m (1,050 ft)

Population (1 January 2025)
  - Total: 4,351
  - Density: 55/km^{2} (140/sq mi)
- Demonym: Acquaspartani
- Time zone: UTC+1 (CET)
  - Summer (DST): UTC+2 (CEST)
- Postal code: 05021
- Dialing code: 0744
- Patron saint: Saint Cecilia
- Website: Official website

Acquasparta is a town and comune in the province of Terni (Umbria, central Italy). It is located on a hill above the Naia Valley and the river of the same name, facing the Monti Martani mountain range.

Acquasparta is one of I Borghi più belli d'Italia ("The most beautiful villages of Italy"). It also sits between two hot springs, the Amerino and the Furapane.

== Etymology ==
In the 19th century Adone Palmieri derived the name Acquasparta from acqua sparsa ("scattered water"), referring either to its position on a low hill in a valley watered by the Naia stream.

== History ==
=== Origins and Middle Ages ===
During the ancient Roman domination the area was a retreat – a spa whose mineralized hot water baths were easily accessible from Rome along the west branch of the via Flaminia. Thermal baths remain open to the public today.

The first reliable evidence for the existence of a settled nucleus at Acquasparta dates to the end of the 10th century. At the time, the territory of Acquasparta formed part of the Terre Arnolfe, lands between Spoleto, Todi and Terni granted by Otto I to Count Arnolf. At an unspecified date it was then subject to the Abbey of Farfa.

By the end of the 12th century the area was ruled by the descendants of Arnolf, known as the Bentivenga family, also referred to as the nobles of Acquasparta. In 1233 the settlement was subjugated by Todi, under whose jurisdiction it remained from the 13th to the 15th century.

On 8 August 1489 it was granted the status of terra franca (free land) by Pope Innocent VIII, implying a degree of local autonomy.

=== Early Modern and Modern era ===
Around 1500, during factional conflicts within Todi, Acquasparta was occupied by one faction and attacked by Altobello da Chiaravalle. The intervention of Pope Alexander VI, supported by leading mercenary captains, led to the destruction of the castle, the capture of Altobello, and the reintegration of the territory into the former Terre Arnolfe. On 10 March 1507 Pope Julius II visited the town, which was still experiencing shortages of food and basic goods as a consequence of those events.

In 1538 Pope Paul III sold Acquasparta to Pier Luigi Farnese. In 1540 it was transferred to Isabella Liviani, wife of Gian Giacomo Cesi, marking the beginning of Cesi family rule over Acquasparta and Portaria. In 1588 Pope Sixtus V elevated the territory to a duchy, with Federico Cesi as its first duke. The duchy reached its peak in the late 16th century under Federico II Cesi.

After the death of Federico II Cesi succession passed to Giovanni Federico Cesi, who resided in Rome and governed through an appointed representative. The plague of 1630 affected the town, and the 1703 Apennine earthquakes caused damage in the area.

In the late 18th century Acquasparta was influenced by events connected to the French invasion of Italy. In 1798 a municipality was established, subject to Spoleto. The last direct descendant of the Cesi family, Federico IX Cesi, renounced his rights over Acquasparta in 1800, retaining only the title. After the fall of Napoleon, direct papal rule was re-established.

According to alternative records, in 1701 Acquasparta was a feudal domain of the Duke Cesi, a status which it is recorded as retaining in 1803. By 15 October 1816, ownership is recorded under Duchess Marianna Massimi Cesi.

On 6 July 1816 Acquasparta was classified as a baronial place within the Delegation of Spoleto. In 1817 it was united administratively with Configni and linked to the governor of San Gemini.

In 1860 Acquasparta was annexed to the Kingdom of Italy. In 1895 Acquasparta had a population of 3,682 inhabitants.

== Geography ==
Acquasparta is located about 8 miles (13 km) south-west of Spoleto. It stands on a low hill overlooking a valley, with the Naia stream flowing at its base. This stream rises in the hills between San Gemini and Quadrelli and flows into the Tiber about 2 miles (3.2 km) below Todi. The surrounding landscape includes the nearby woodland of Monte Scoppio.The climate is described as temperate but humid, with frequent fog, especially in the mornings and evenings.

=== Subdivisions ===
The municipality includes the localities of Acquasparta, Canepine, Casigliano, Casteldelmonte, Collebianco, Configni, Firenzuola, Macerino, Portaria, Rosaro, San Nicolò, Santa Barbara, Selvarelle.

In 2021, 878 people lived in rural dispersed dwellings not assigned to any named locality. At the time, the most populous locality was Acquasparta proper (2,907).

==== Scoppio ====
Scoppio is an uninhabited hamlet of Acquasparta, located at about 640 metres (2,100 ft) above sea level. It developed around a medieval castle built on a prominent rocky spur, with its name deriving from the Latin scopulus (rock, crag). Once held by the Arnolfi family, the settlement was abandoned around 1950 following earthquake damage. Remains of the 14th-century walls and the church of San Pietro, with fragments of frescoes attributed to Piermatteo Piergili, are still visible.

== Economy ==
Local industries in the 19th century included the manufacture of pottery and bricks. The land produced grain, wine, and oil, as well as abundant pasture. Deposits of lignite were also present, though they were not exploited at the time.

Within the municipal territory there is a mineral spring known as Amerino or of San Francesco.

== Religion ==
=== San Francesco ===
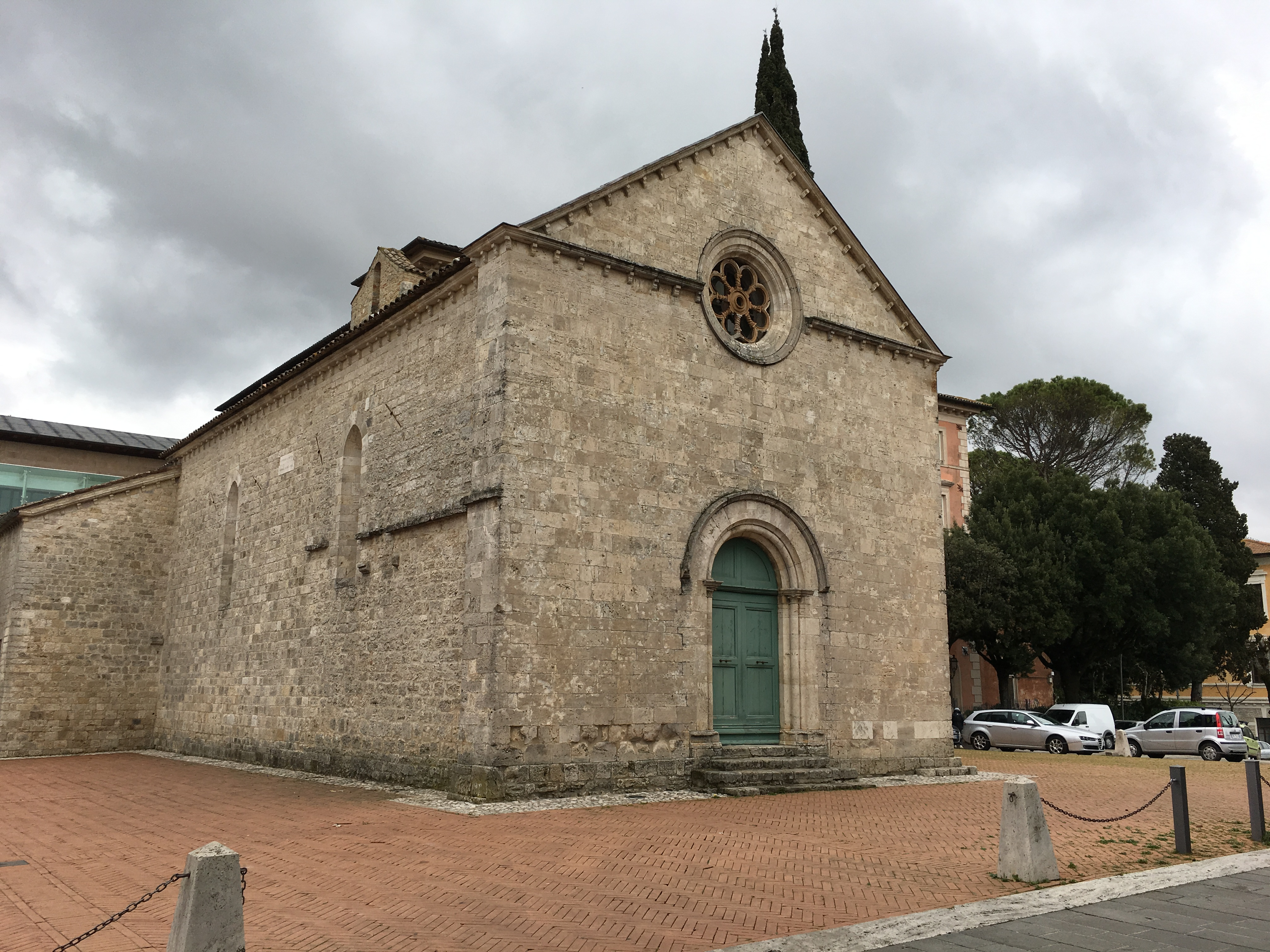
Church of San Francesco, showing its central rose window

Located outside the town walls, the Church of San Francesco was built in 1294 by Cardinal Matteo Bentivenga d'Acquasparta. It represents a typical example of early Franciscan architecture, marking a transition from Romanesque forms.

Inside the church is an icon of the Virgin and Child dating to the first half of the 14th century, traditionally venerated under the title of Madonna della Stella and associated with episodes such as plagues, earthquakes, and wars. Also preserved is a Franciscan painting copied from a work by Margaritone d'Arezzo, depicting Saint Francis and episodes from his life, as well as an ancient 14th-century wooden crucifix brought to the church from San Giovanni di Butris.

In the sacristy is an octagonal ciborium decorated with oil paintings attributed to Rinaldo di Calvi, depicting figures including Saint Francis, Saint Clare, Saint Louis, and Saint Bernardino of Siena. The cloister preserves elements of the original construction, including columns and a well.

Inside is a votive fresco dated 1430 depicting the Virgin enthroned with saints. The high altar features a mensa supported by twelve small columns in Gothic style.

=== Santa Cecilia ===
The church of Santa Cecilia, dedicated to the patron saint of the town, dates to the 12th century, as evidenced by its apse. Of particular interest is the Cesi Chapel, built in 1581 by Isabella Liviani Cesi, great-grandmother of Federico Cesi.

Within the collegiate church are seven canvases placed in the chapels, executed by various painters from the late 16th century to the second half of the 18th century.

=== Madonna del Giglio ===
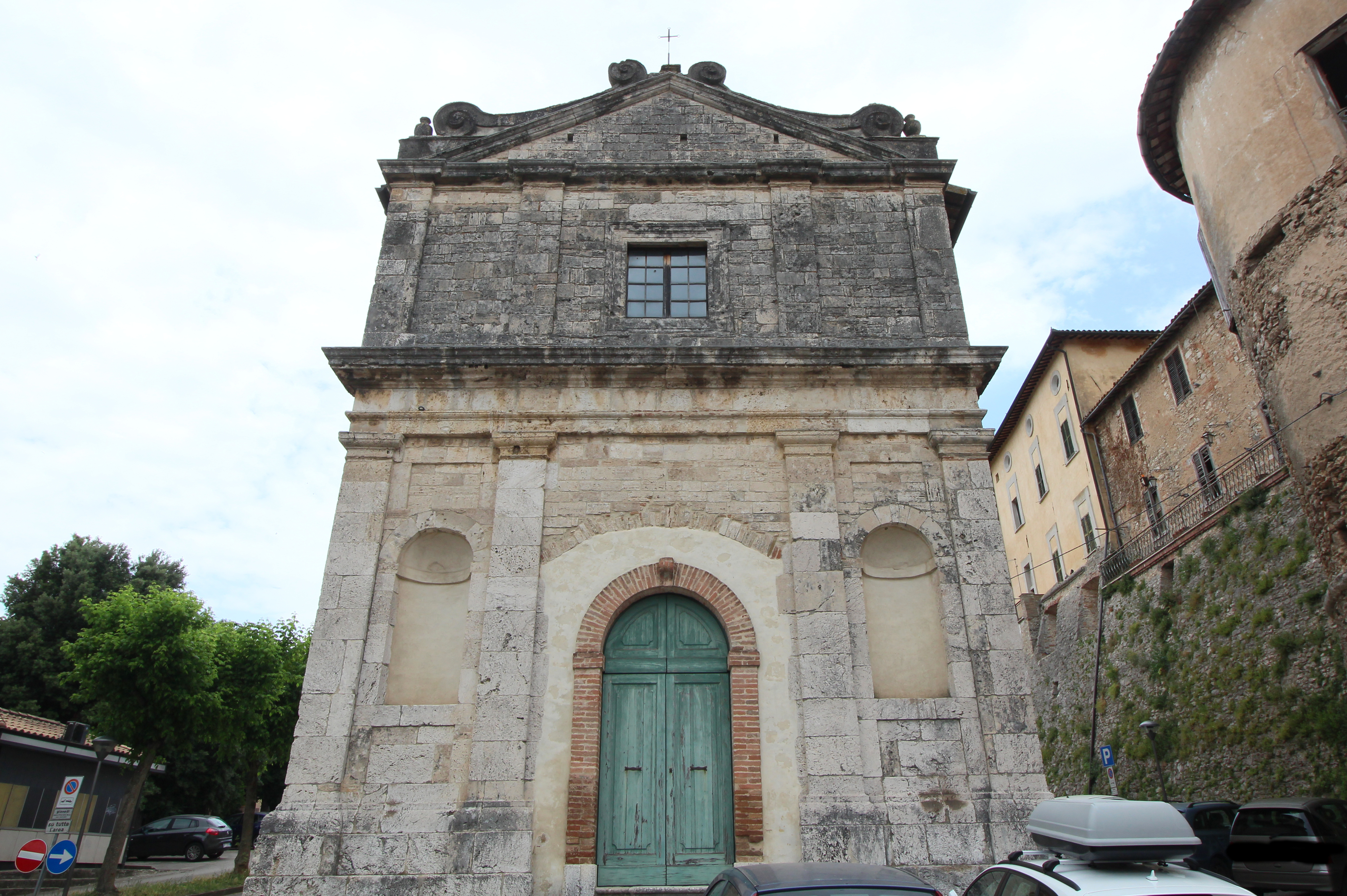
Façade of the Madonna del Giglio, with a central arched doorway in brick, flanked by blind niches

The Church of the Madonna del Giglio, located opposite the Porta Vecchia which formerly served as the entrance to the town, dates to the 17th century. Inside are numerous frescoes, some of which remain well preserved.

=== Sacramento ===
The Church of the Sacrament was built in 1684 by the Confraternity of the Most Holy Sacrament. The building has a square plan and originally had a wooden trussed roof until the mid-19th century. Inside is a fragment of a Roman mosaic originating from the ancient city of Carsulae.

=== Other religious heritage ===
Other churches include:

- Madonna of the Cross: church completed in 1606
- Santissimo Sacramento: church incorporating a Roman Mosaic in its floor, is a very good example of 17th-century architecture
- San Giovanni de Butris: church a short way from Acquasparta, built on the remains of a Roman bridge, and incorporates very large Roman stone blocks.

== Culture ==
The town is notable as the seat of a learned academy founded by Federico Cesi, which gave rise to the Accademia dei Lincei. In the 16th century Federico Cesi hosted leading scholars of Europe in this academy, contributing to the revival of the sciences.

=== Palazzo Cesi ===
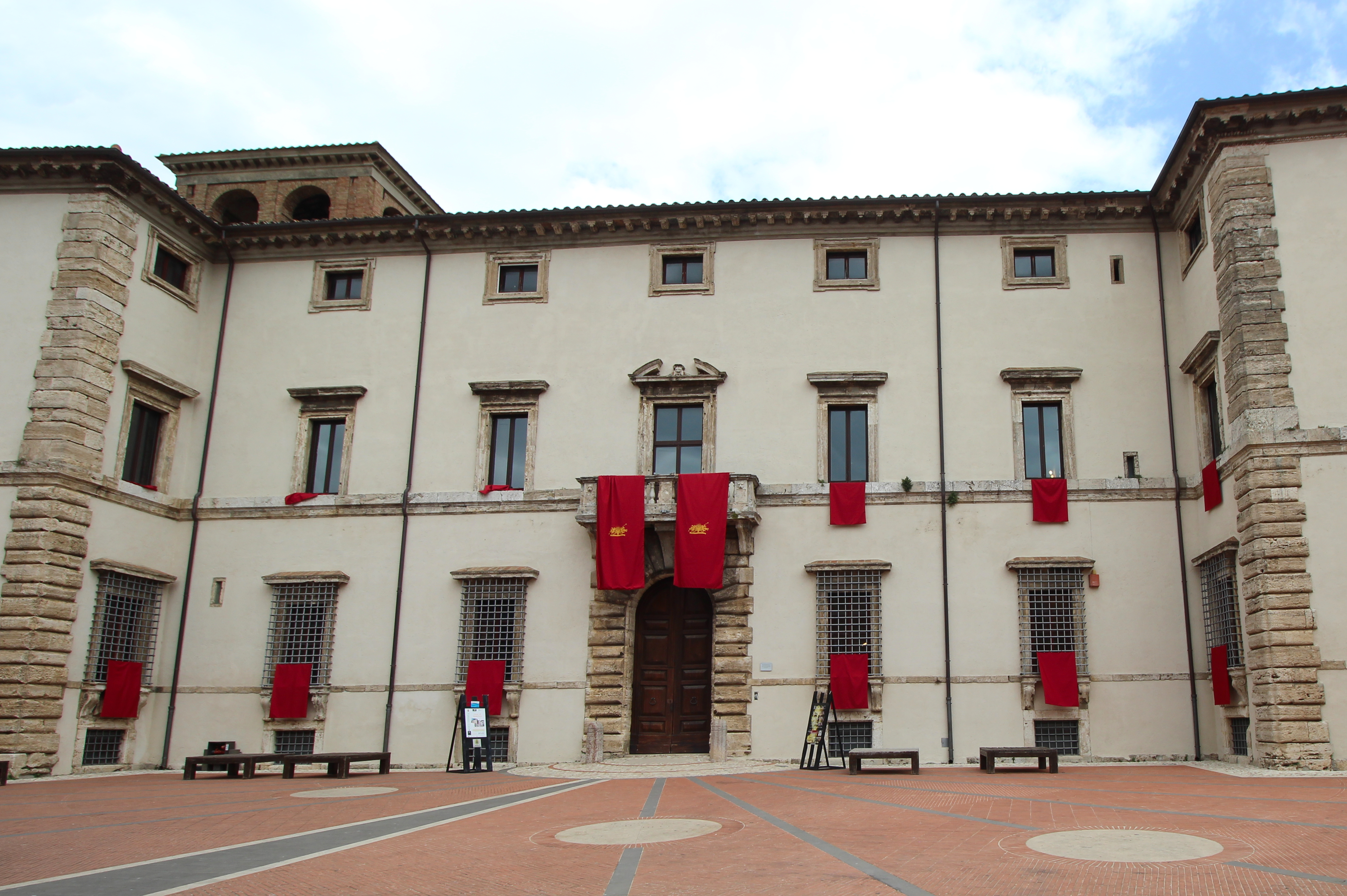
Palazzo Cesi

Palazzo Cesi was developed in the 16th century after Gian Giacomo Cesi and his wife Isabella of Alviano obtained the fief of Acquasparta in 1540. The palace was designed from 1561 by the Florentine architect Guidetto Guidetti, later replaced by the Milanese Gian Domenico Bianchi, and was completed around 1579.

Its façade has three stories, with projecting sides resembling towers. The interior includes a courtyard with two orders of loggias and Roman inscriptions originating from the ruins of Carsulae. The lower floor contains vaulted rooms painted by the Zuccari brothers, while the upper floor has a large hall and smaller rooms decorated with carved wooden ceilings and painted friezes.

In the early 17th century it became the residence of Federico Cesi and the seat of the Accademia dei Lincei. The palace hosted scientific activity and in 1624 also received Galileo Galilei.

The building is entered through a passage leading to the ground floor, from which a staircase gives access to the piano nobile. The interiors are decorated with frescoes celebrating the origins and military achievements of the Cesi family, alongside richly coffered wooden ceilings. Decorative cycles include mythological subjects inspired by Ovid's Metamorphoses, and the emblem of the Accademia dei Lincei, depicting a lynx encircled by a laurel wreath.

=== Other cultural sites ===
The historical center was once surrounded by medieval walls but, now mostly torn down, leaving only short stretches and a few cylindrical towers that at one time served as part of the town's defenses.

About 0.5 kilometres (0.31 mi) to the south-east of the town are the remains of a solid Roman bridge built of large blocks of travertine, the Ponte Fonnaia.

The surrounding countryside is charming in the Umbrian way, spotted with a few small castles such as the one at Configni.

== Notable people ==
The Cesi family is prominently associated with Acquasparta, particularly through the patronage of Federico Cesi and the construction of their ducal palace.

In the religious sphere, figures from Acquasparta include Bentivenga dei Bentivenghi, a Catholic bishop, as well as the theologian and philosopher Matthew of Aquasparta, who also served as a bishop. Other figures originating from Acquasparta include Floro Finistauri and Giannetto d'Acquasparta.

The principal families of Acquasparta in the 19th century included the Santini, Mimmi, and Diana.
