= Donation of Sutri =

728 agreement between the King of the Lombards and the Papacy

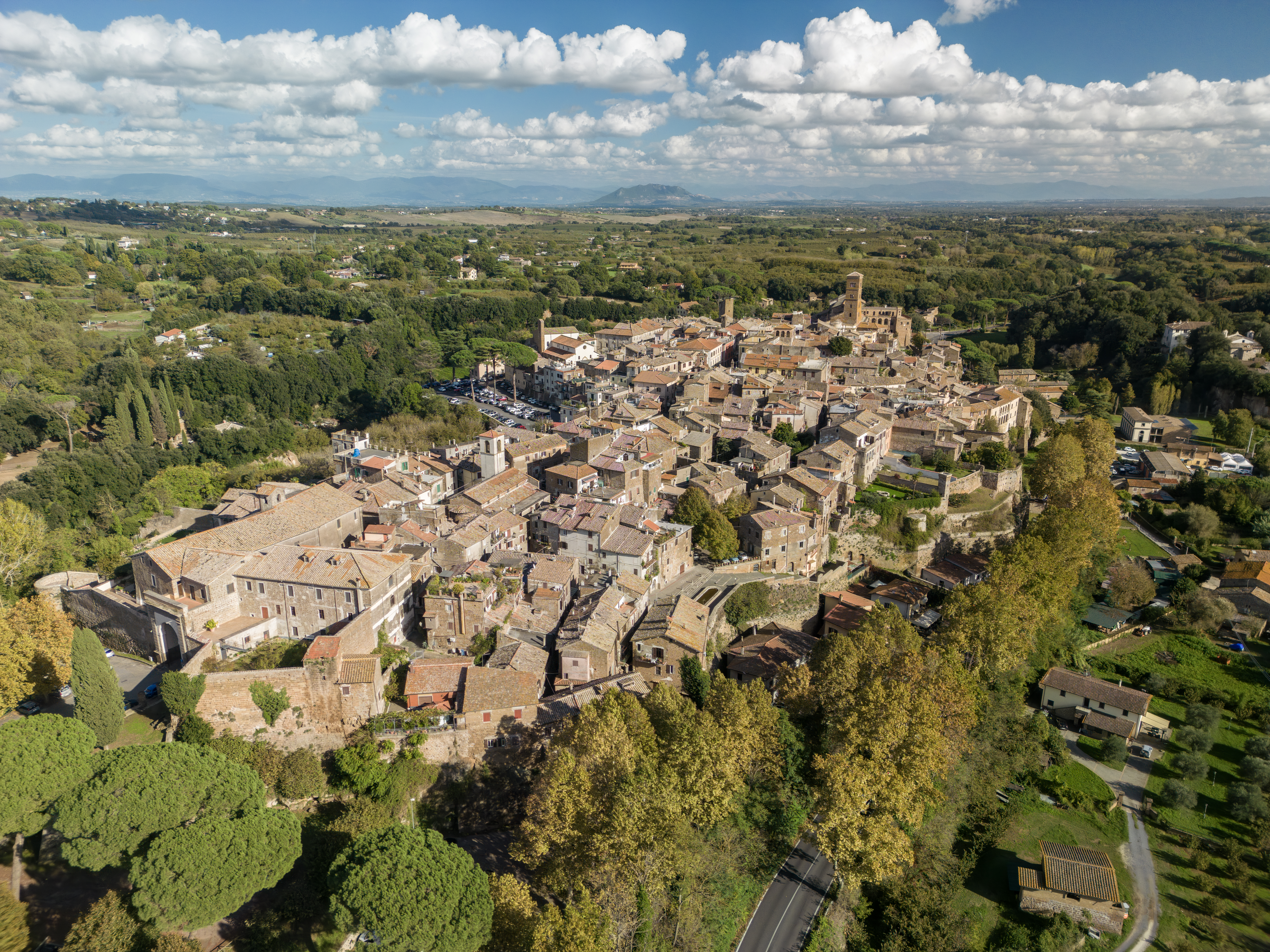
View of Sutri

The Donation of Sutri was an agreement reached at Sutri by Liutprand, King of the Lombards and Pope Gregory II in 728. At Sutri, the two reached an agreement by which the city and some hill towns in Latium (like Vetralla) were given to the Papacy, "as a gift to the blessed Apostles Peter and Paul" according to the Liber Pontificalis. The pact formed the first extension of papal territory beyond the confines of the Duchy of Rome and was the first of two land transfers from Liutprand to the Church of Rome.

== History ==
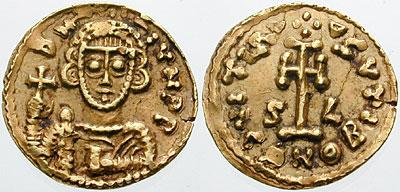
Coin depicting Liutprand, c. 751–755

The Lombards had long been adherents to the Christian sect of Arianism, but they had converted to Catholicism over time. After his election as King of the Lombards in 712, Liutprand faced a series of challenges from the strength of aristocratic families and the threat of secession from the grand duchies in his domain. The duchies of Spoleto and Benevento in Langobardia Minor were particularly autonomous from Liutprand's central power and were separated from the rest of the kingdom by the informal division of the Byzantine Corridor that ran through the center of Italy, from Rome to north of Ravenna.

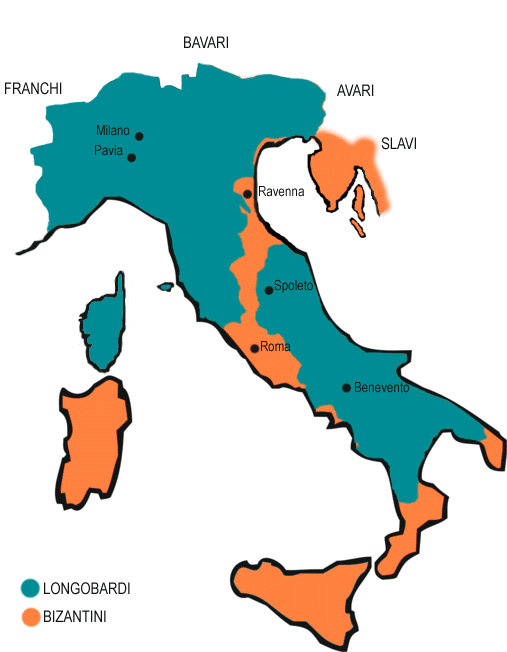
The Lombard Kingdom after Liutprand's conquests

Liutprand began to centralize the power of his kingdom. Meanwhile, he found support from Rome and the Papal State once disputes over iconoclasm turned them against the Byzantine Empire, which controlled the territory that divided it into two parts. Liutprand seized the moment when the Italian territories governed by the Byzantines rejected the emperor Leo III the Isaurian's support of iconoclasm. Liutprand's military campaign began with his goal to take the territory that divided Langobardia in two—the duchy of Rome and the Byzantine Corridor.

When the Pope understood Liutprand's intentions—that he would probably decide to conquer Rome—he felt endangered. For many years, the Byzantine Empire had ceased to intervene militarily for Rome, using its energies only for the defense of Ravenna. The course of Liutprand's campaign changed, however, when in 728, the Lombards conquered the fortress of Narni, the strategic center of the Via Flaminia. Having lost the Roman road, the Byzantines concentrated their defenses upon the Via Amerina, the only Roman road that left Rome and crossed Umbria and Picenum.

Controlling the Via Amerina were the fortresses of Todi, Amelia, and Orte. Further south, the castra of Bomarzo, Sutri, and Blera safeguarded the Via Cassia. In 728, Liutprand took the castle of Sutri, which held strategic importance in the duchy of Rome and dominated the highway at Nepi on the roads to Perugia and Tuscany.

Pope Gregory II asked Liutprand directly to renounce the territories he had just conquered and to return them to the control of the Byzantine Exarchate of Ravenna. By that time, Liutprand had already quelled the rebelling duchies of Spoleto and Benevento. Softened by the entreaties of Pope Gregory II, he restored Sutri "as a gift to the blessed Apostles Peter and Paul" directly to the Papal State. According to Gustav Schnürer,

This expression of the "Liber pontificalis" was erroneously interpreted to mean that in this gift the beginning of the States of the Church was to be recognized. This is incorrect inasmuch as the popes continued to acknowledge the imperial Government, and Greek officials appear in Rome for some time longer. True it is, however, that here for the first time we meet the association of ideas on which the States of the Church were to be constructed. The pope asked the Lombards for the return of Sutri for the sake of the Princes of the Apostles and threatened punishment by these sainted protectors. The pious Liutprand was undoubtedly susceptible to such pleas, but never to any consideration for the Greeks. For this reason he gave Sutri to Peter and Paul, that he might not expose himself to their punishment. What the pope then did with it would be immaterial to him.

The pact was the first extension of Papal territory beyond the confines of the Duchy of Rome.

== Political context ==
At the end of the 7th century, under Pope Gregory I, the Catholic church had been forced to replace the Byzantine administration in providing for the population of Rome and the surrounding countryside. The population had suffered under several famines and plagues during that time. With the assent to the Papacy's intervention by the Byzantine Empire and the Exarchate of Ravenna, the Pope placed the duchy of Rome's civil and military administration under his control. Often, to defend the territory and in the name of the Emperor, the same Pope Gregory had to exercise the duchy's imperium (the command of the military garrison) over the Byzantine troops stationed in Rome.

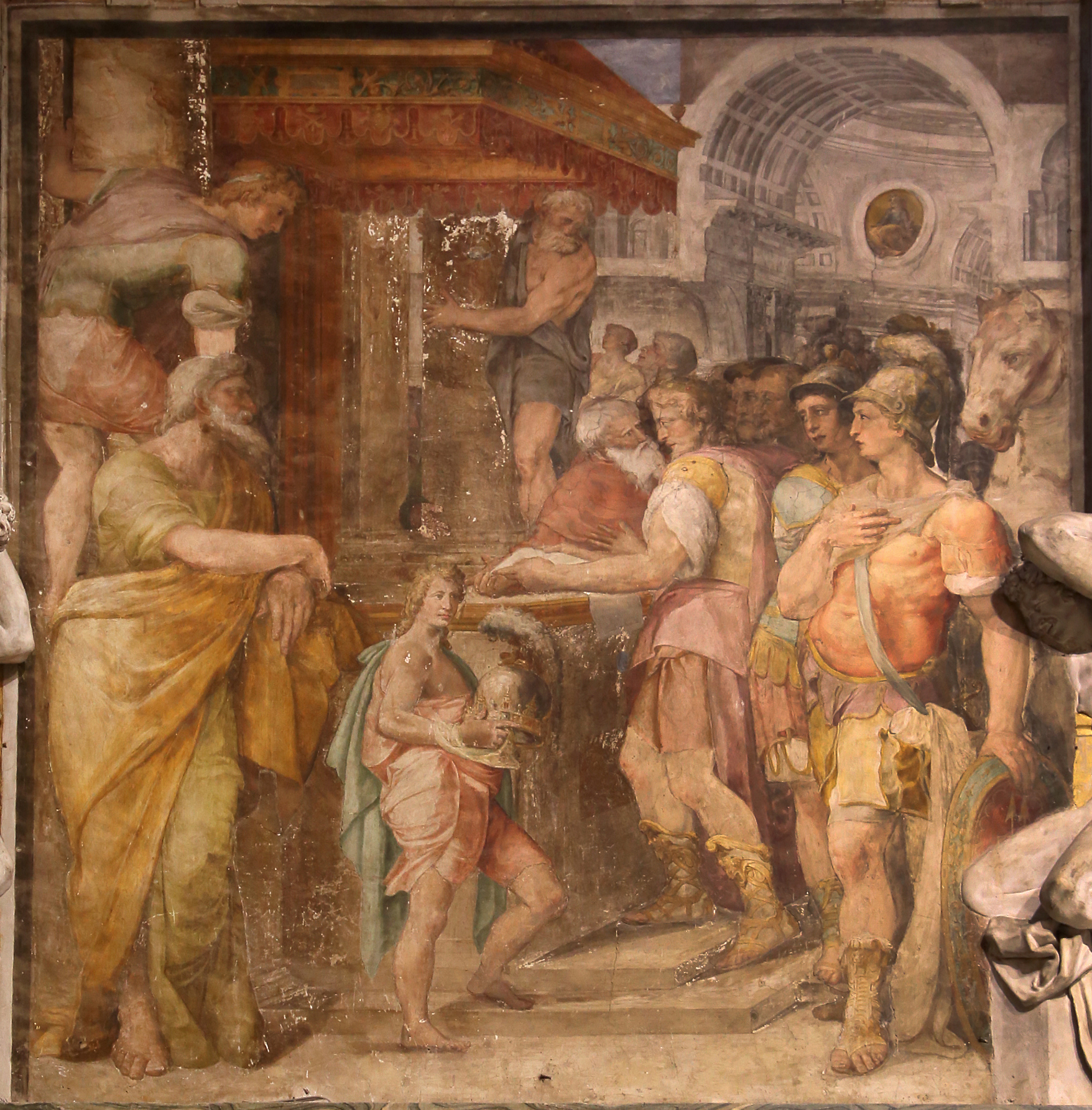
1565 fresco of Liutprand Confirms the Donation of Aripert to Gregory II

In this period, the duchy's de facto acquisition by the Pope lead to a new political role for the Papacy in the territory and its surroundings. This was not by virtue of a formal territorial sovereignty, but by the recognition of the states surrounding it and the peoples living within it. The heightened political clout of the Church, that also had religious authority, also lead to a restructuring of the Papal household to address its increased secular responsibilities.

The Lombardic donations of the first castles in the 8th century, including Sutri, formally intended "for the Apostles Peter and Paul", took place in recognition of the consolidated political role of the Church, which the Lombard kings saw as a power in the political equilibrium of the Italian peninsula. That belief was strengthened by the traditions of Papal primacy and Apostolic succession—the Papacy's moral authority had come to be recognized even by the Germanic peoples: the Franks, the Visigoths of Spain, the Burgundians, the Anglo-Saxons of England, and the Lombards themselves.

On the other hand, the Papacy was already the owner of numerous territories, the Patrimonia, documented churches and monasteries given to the Pope. These had been received by the end of the 4th century, as testified by the Edict of Milan through which Constantine and Licinius ordered that previously confiscated goods be returned to the Church and as described in the Liber Pontificalis. In the years just before the Donation of Sutri, other restitutions of land had come to the Catholic Church from the Lombards, like lands in Alpi Cozie and the city of Cumae.

The Donation of Sutri, which occurred during the revolt against the Byzantine iconoclast decrees, placed the Roman population on the side of the Pope, against the representatives of the Byzantine Empire. The Donation was one of the few times the Papal State aligned itself against the legitimate rulers of territory surrounding Rome. The recognition of the Papal State's authority, even if it was de facto and not de jure, by the Lombards would be accentuated in the following years by the successors of Gregory II (Popes Gregory III and Zachary), thanks to the growing disinterest and distance of the Byzantine Emperors.

== Legacy ==
In 739, Pope Gregory III addressed a letter to Charles Martel, master of the Frankish kings' royal palace in which appeared, for the first time, the phrase "populus peculiaris beati Petri". The Pope was referring to the population of the duchies of Rome, Ravenna, and the Pentapolis as living together in a republic, of which Saint Peter was the protector and eponymous hero.

Between 739 and 741, the following were added to the land ceded with Sutri: Gallese, Amelia, Orte, Blera, and Bomarzo. And again in 743, Liutprand titled to Pope Zachary four cities that he had occupied—Vetralla, Palestrina, Ninfa, and Norma—as well as restoring to the Pope part of the Sabina that had been taken by the dukes of Spoleto thirty years before. Liutprand, having temporarily eased the tensions between the Lombardic dukes of Spoleto and Benevento, avoided a civil war.

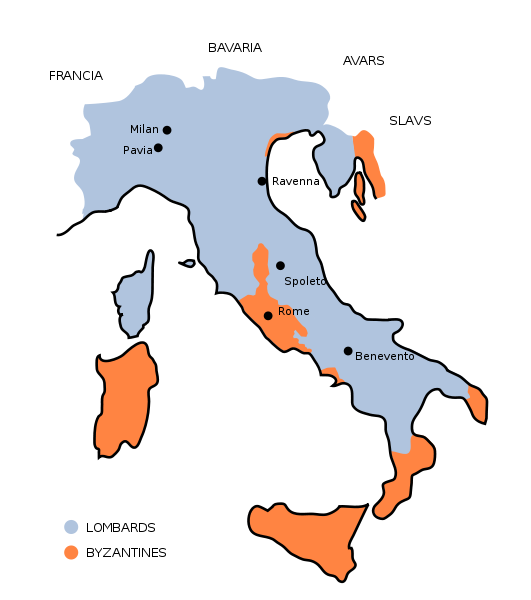
Lombard Kingdom after Aistulf's conquests in 751 AD

The Donation of Sutri was followed in 754 by the Donation of Pepin, affirmed in Pavia by the Frankish king Pepin the Short.

Through the close pacts with the Frankish sovereigns from the second half of the 9th century, the Papal State was no longer solely the patrimony of the archbishop of Rome, but as a body with recognized jurisdiction to which Pepin the Short guaranteed military protection in 754 against potential aggression by the Lombardic kings. The following restitutions of the Lombardic kings to the Papacy in 774, including Ravenna and the Duchy of the Pentapolis—induced by pacts with the Franks—spoke directly of a return to the "republic of Romans' of which the bishop of Rome was recognized as leader.

Another consequence of the Donation of Sutri was the drafting of the false document, the Donation of Constantine. According to the document, retrodated to 321, the Roman Emperor Constantine had ceded to the Catholic Church of Pope Sylvester I the civil jurisdiction of the city of Rome, Italy, and the entire Western Roman Empire. The authenticity of the Donation of Constantine was greatly debated among the Catholic canon law synods after the year 1000 and was questioned by the Germanic and Frankish chanceries. While they couldn't place the document itself in doubt, they had evidence that the plan was inconsistent with the claimed prerogatives of the Church.

Given the uncertain secular power of the Church when the Donation of Constantine was forged (the 9th and 10th centuries), the document reflects the new role occupied by the Papal State and the jurisdictional status it intended to retain, especially regarding Rome. This was a claim particularly useful for the new representatives of the Holy Roman Empire, that was born in the year 800 thanks to the support of the Papal State.

== See also ==
- Translatio imperii
- Inter caetera
- Caesaropapism
- Byzantine Papacy

== Bibliography ==
- Cardini, Franco; Montesano, Marina (2006). Storia medievale (in Italian) (1. ed.). Florence: Le Monnier università. ISBN 8800204740.
- Hutiv, B (2017). "Formation of the Papal possessions in Italy and establishment of the Papal state" (PDF). Visnyk of the Lviv University (64): 37–46. doi:10.30970/vla.2017.64.7296.
