= Holy See =

Jurisdiction of the Catholic Church and Vatican City

Holy See: Sancta Sedes (Latin); Santa Sede (Italian)
- Flag of Vatican City and of the Holy See Coat of arms of the Holy See
- Anthem: Inno Pontificio (Italian) "Pontifical Hymn" noicon
- Ecclesiastical jurisdiction: Diocese of Rome Worldwide (Note: Universal full communion, Latin Church, Catholic Church.); 41°54.2′N 12°27.2′E
- Official languages: Latin
- Working language: Italian
- Religion: Roman Catholicism
- Demonyms: Papal; Pontifical; Vatican
- Type: Apostolic (Note: Episcopal see of the Bishop of Rome, the Pope, head of the worldwide Catholic Church.); Theocracy (Note: The Pope as head of state or sovereign of the Vatican City State.)
- Government: Unitary theocratic Catholic elective absolute monarchy
  - Pope: Leo XIV
  - Cardinal Secretary of State: Pietro Parolin
  - Camerlengo of the Holy Roman Church: Kevin Farrell
  - President of the Governorate of Vatican City: Raffaella Petrini

Sovereign entity under international law
  - Apostolic see: 1st century by Saint Peter ("Prince of the Apostles")
  - Papal primacy: Early Church – Antiquity (Canon law; legal history)
  - Donation of Sutri: 728 (territory in Duchy of Rome by Lombard King Liutprand)
  - Donation of Pepin: 756 (sovereignty in Duchy of Rome reaffirmed by Frankish King Pepin)
  - Papal States: 756–1870; 1075: Dictatus papae 1177: Treaty of Venice (sovereignty reaffirmed by Emperor Frederick I of the Holy Roman Empire)
  - Prisoner in the Vatican: 1870–1929 (control of the area under the Kingdom of Italy)
  - Vatican City: 1929–present (Lateran Treaty with Italy creates the modern state of Vatican City)
- Website vatican.va

The Holy See (Latin: Sancta Sedes, lit. 'Holy Chair', Ecclesiastical Latin pronunciation: [ˈsaŋkta ˈsedes]; Italian: Santa Sede [ˈsanta ˈsɛːde]), also called the See of Rome, the Petrine See or the Apostolic See, is the central governing body of the Catholic Church and Vatican City. It encompasses the office of the pope as the bishop of the apostolic episcopal see of Rome, and serves as the spiritual and administrative authority of the worldwide Catholic Church and Vatican City. Under international law, the Holy See holds the status of a sovereign juridical entity.

According to Catholic historical records and tradition, the Holy See was founded in the first century by Saint Peter and Saint Paul. By virtue of the doctrines of Petrine and papal primacy, it is the focal point of full communion for Catholics around the world. The Holy See is headquartered in, operates from, and exercises "exclusive dominion" over the Vatican City, an independent city-state enclaved in Rome, where the pope is the elected monarch, and therefore head of state.

The Holy See is administered by the Roman Curia, which is the central institution assisting the pope and through which the affairs of the Catholic Church are conducted. The Roman Curia includes dicasteries, comparable to ministries or executive departments. The Cardinal Secretary of State is its chief administrator. Papal elections are carried out by members of the College of Cardinals.

Although the Holy See is often metonymically referred to as the "Vatican", the Vatican City State was distinctively established with the Lateran Treaty of 1929, agreed between the Holy See and the Kingdom of Italy, to ensure the temporal, diplomatic, and spiritual independence of the papacy. As such, papal nuncios, who are papal diplomats to states and international organizations, are recognized as representing the Holy See and not the Vatican City State, as prescribed in the canon law of the Catholic Church. The Holy See is thus viewed as the central government of the Catholic Church and Vatican City. While the Catholic Church is composed of the Latin Church and 23 other particular churches or rites with their own laws and practices, the Holy See acts as the arbiter of relations between them.

The Holy See maintains bilateral diplomatic relations with 180 sovereign states, signs concordats and treaties, and performs multilateral diplomacy with multiple intergovernmental organizations, including the United Nations and its agencies, the Council of Europe, the European Union, the Organization for Security and Co-operation in Europe, and the Organization of American States.

== Terminology ==
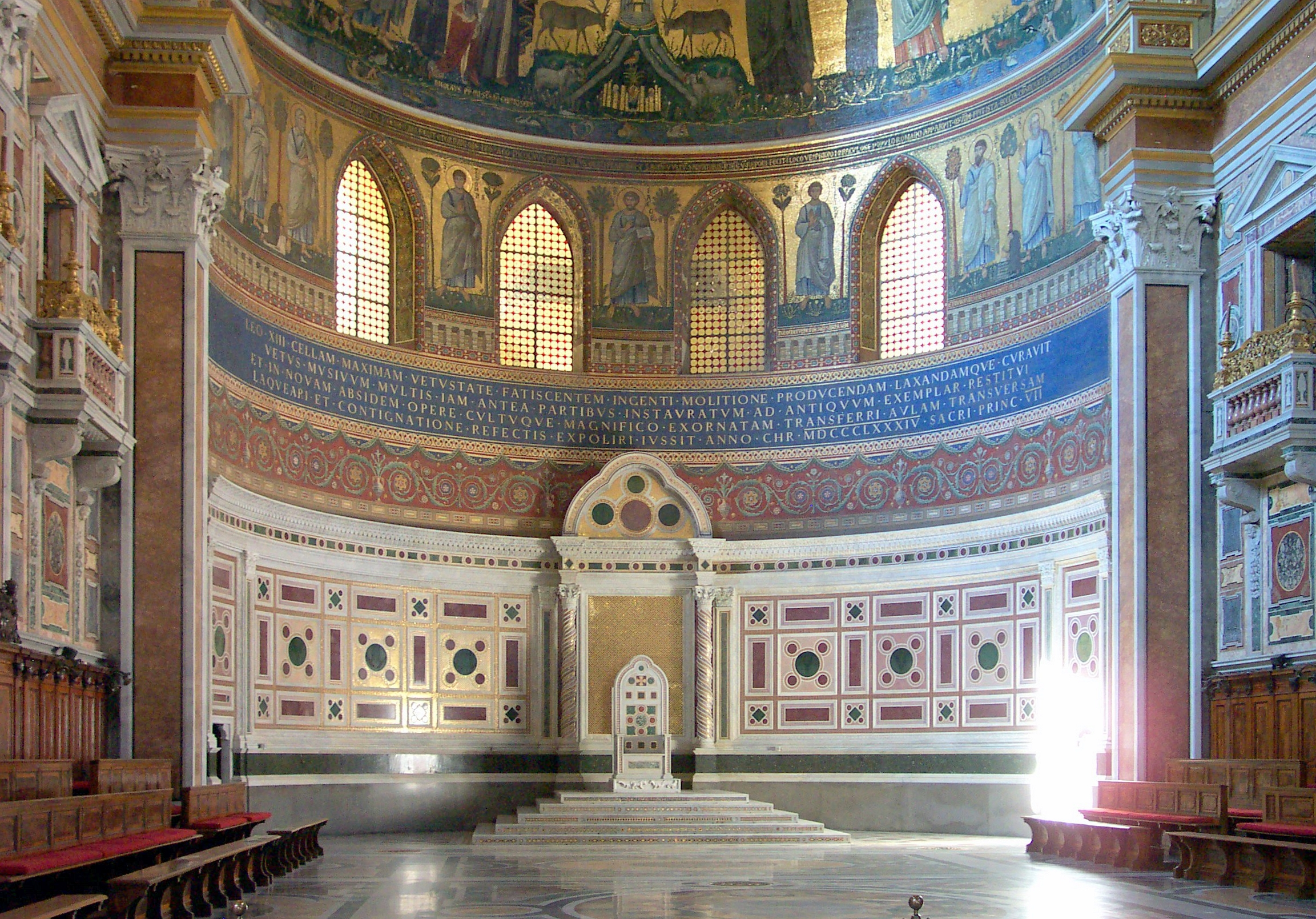
The papal throne (cathedra), in the apse of Archbasilica of Saint John Lateran, symbolises the Holy See.

The word "see" comes from the Latin word sedes, meaning 'seat', which refers to the episcopal throne (cathedra). The term "Apostolic See" can refer to any see founded by one of the Twelve Apostles. When used with the definite article, it is used in the Catholic Church to refer specifically to the see of the Bishop of Rome, whom that Church considers the successor of Saint Peter. While St. Peter's Basilica in Vatican City is perhaps the church most associated with the papacy, the actual cathedral of the Holy See is the Archbasilica of Saint John Lateran in Rome. (Note: Although Saint John Lateran is legally within Rome, it is one of the properties of the Holy See granted extraterritorial privileges.)

In the Catholic Church, only the see of the Pope bears the right to be addressed symbolically as "holy". There was one exception to this rule, represented by the Bishopric of Mainz. During the Holy Roman Empire, the former Archbishopric of Mainz, which was also of electoral and primatial rank, had the privilege to bear the title of "the Holy See of Mainz" (Latin: Sancta Sedes Moguntina). However, the diocese of Mainz is still referred to as the Holy See.

== History ==
According to Catholic tradition, the apostolic see of Diocese of Rome was established in the 1st century by Saint Peter and Saint Paul.

In 313, the legal status of the Catholic Church and its property was recognised by the Edict of Milan, by Roman emperor Constantine the Great. The Donation of Constantine supposedly transferred Western Roman political authority to the Pope, and was widely accepted until it was revealed to be a fraud shortly before the Reformation.

In 380, it became the state church of the Roman Empire via the Edict of Thessalonica, by Emperor Theodosius I. After the fall of the Western Roman Empire in 476, the temporal legal jurisdiction of the papal primacy was further recognised as promulgated in Canon law. In 728, the Holy See was granted territory in the Duchy of Rome by the Donation of Sutri by King Liutprand of the Lombards. In 756, it was granted sovereignty by the territorial Donation of Pepin, by King Pepin of the Franks.

From 756 to 1870, the Papal States held extensive territory and armed forces. In 800, Pope Leo III crowned Charlemagne as Roman Emperor by translatio imperii. The Pope's temporal power peaked around the time of the papal coronations of the emperors of the Holy Roman Empire from 858, and the Dictatus papae in 1075, which conversely also described Papal deposing power. Several modern states trace their own sovereignty to recognition in medieval papal bulls. The sovereignty of the Holy See was retained despite multiple sacks of Rome during the Early Middle Ages. Relations with the Kingdom of Italy and the Holy Roman Empire were at times strained, reaching from the Diploma Ottonianum and Libellus de imperatoria potestate in urbe Roma regarding the "Patrimony of Saint Peter" in the 10th century, to the Investiture Controversy in 1076–1122, and settled again by the Concordat of Worms in 1122. The exiled Avignon Papacy during 1309–1376 also put a strain on the papacy, which returned to Rome. In 1648, Pope Innocent X was critical of the Peace of Westphalia, as it weakened the authority of the Holy See throughout much of Europe. From 1798 to 1799, following the French Revolution, the Papal States were briefly occupied as the "Roman Republic", as a sister republic of the First French Empire under Napoleon, before their territory was reestablished.

The Holy See was represented in and identified as a "permanent subject of general customary international law vis-à-vis all states" in the Congress of Vienna (1814–1815). The Papal States were recognised under the rule of the Papacy and largely restored to their former extent. Despite the Capture of Rome in 1870 by the Kingdom of Italy and the Roman Question during the Savoyard era, which made the Pope a "prisoner in the Vatican" from 1870 to 1929, its international legal subject was "constituted by the ongoing reciprocity of diplomatic relationships" that not only were maintained but multiplied. In 1929, the Lateran Treaty between the Holy See and Italy recognised Vatican City as an independent city-state, along with extraterritorial properties around the region. Since then, Vatican City is distinct from yet under "full ownership, exclusive dominion, and sovereign authority and jurisdiction" of the Holy See (Latin: Sancta Sedes). (Note: The Holy See is the central governing body of the Catholic Church and a sovereign entity recognized by international law, consisting of the Pope and the Roman Curia. It is also commonly referred to as "the Vatican", especially when used as a metonym for the hierarchy of the Catholic Church.)

== Organization ==
The Holy See is one of the last remaining seven absolute monarchies in the world, along with Saudi Arabia, Eswatini, United Arab Emirates, Qatar, Brunei and Oman. The Pope governs the Catholic Church through the Roman Curia. The Curia is a complex of offices that administer church affairs at the highest level, including the Secretariat of State, nineteen dicasteries, three Tribunals, eleven Pontifical Councils, and seven Pontifical Commissions.

The Secretariat of State, under the Cardinal Secretary of State, directs and coordinates the Curia. The incumbent, Cardinal Pietro Parolin, is the See's equivalent of a prime minister. Archbishop Paul Gallagher, Secretary of the Section for Relations with States of the Secretariat of State, acts as the Holy See's minister of foreign affairs. Parolin was named in his role by Pope Francis on 31 August 2013.

Vatican City, the Holy See's sovereign territory

The Secretariat of State is the only body of the Curia that is situated within Vatican City. The others are in buildings in different parts of Rome that have extraterritorial rights similar to those of embassies.

Among the most active of the major Curial institutions are the Dicastery for the Doctrine of the Faith, which oversees the Catholic Church's doctrine; the Dicastery for Bishops, which coordinates the appointment of bishops worldwide; the Dicastery for Evangelization, which oversees all missionary activities; and the Dicastery for Promoting Integral Human Development, which deals with international peace and social issues.

Three tribunals exercise judicial power. The Roman Rota handles normal judicial appeals, the most numerous being those that concern alleged nullity of marriage. The Apostolic Signatura is the supreme appellate and administrative court concerning decisions even of the Roman Rota and administrative decisions of ecclesiastical superiors (bishops and superiors of religious institutes), such as closing a parish or removing someone from office. It also oversees the work of other ecclesiastical tribunals at all levels.

The Apostolic Penitentiary deals with matters of conscience, granting absolutions from censures, dispensations, commutations, validations, condonations, and other favors. It also grants indulgences.

The Prefecture for the Economic Affairs of the Holy See coordinates the finances of the Holy See departments and supervises the administration of all offices, whatever be their degree of autonomy, that manage these finances. The most important of these is the Administration of the Patrimony of the Apostolic See.

The Prefecture of the Papal Household is responsible for the organization of the papal household, audiences, and ceremonies, apart from the strictly liturgical part.

Pope Francis reorganized the Curia to prioritize its role in the church's mission to evangelize. This reform insisted that the Curia is not meant to be a centralized bureaucracy, but a service for the Pope and diocesan bishops that is in communication with local bishops' conferences. Likewise more lay people are to be involved in the workings of the dicasteries and in giving them input.

The Holy See does not dissolve upon a pope's death or resignation. It instead operates under a different set of laws sede vacante. During this interregnum, the heads of the dicasteries of the Curia, such as the prefects of congregations, cease immediately to hold office. The only exceptions are the Major Penitentiary, who continues his important role regarding absolutions and dispensations, and the Camerlengo of the Holy Roman Church, who administers the temporalities (i.e., properties and finances) of the See of St. Peter during this period. The government of the See, and therefore of the Catholic Church, then falls to the College of Cardinals. Canon law prohibits the College and the Camerlengo from introducing any innovations or novelties in the government of the church during this period.

In 2001, the Holy See had a revenue of 422.098 billion Italian lire, about US$202 million at the time, and a net income of 17.720 billion Italian lire, about US$8 million. According to an article by David Leigh in the Guardian newspaper, a 2012 report from the Council of Europe identified the value of a section of the Vatican's property assets as an amount in excess of €680m (£570m). In January 2013, Paolo Mennini, a papal official in Rome, managed this portion of the Holy See's assets—consisting of British investments, other European holdings and a currency trading arm. The Guardian newspaper described Mennini and his role in the following manner: "... Paolo Mennini, who is in effect the Pope's merchant banker. Mennini heads a special unit inside the Vatican called the extraordinary division of APSA – Amministrazione del Patrimonio della Sede Apostolica – which handles the 'patrimony of the Holy See'."

The orders, decorations, and medals of the Holy See are conferred by the Pope as temporal sovereign and fons honorum of the Holy See, similar to the orders awarded by other heads of state.

== Status in international law ==
The Holy See has been recognized, both in state practice and in the writing of modern legal scholars, as a subject of public international law, with rights and duties analogous to those of States. Although the Holy See, as distinct from the Vatican City State, does not fulfill the long-established criteria in international law of statehood—having a permanent population, a defined territory, a stable government, and the capacity to enter into relations with other states—its possession of full legal personality in international law is shown by the fact that it maintains diplomatic relations with 180 states, that it is a member-state in various intergovernmental international organizations, and that it is: "respected by the international community of sovereign States and treated as a subject of international law having the capacity to engage in diplomatic relations and to enter into binding agreements with one, several, or many states under international law that are largely geared to establish and preserving peace in the world."

=== Diplomacy ===
Foreign relations with the Holy See: Diplomatic relations Other relations No relations

Since medieval times the episcopal see of Rome has been recognized as a sovereign entity. The Holy See (not the State of Vatican City) maintains formal diplomatic relations with and for the most recent establishment of diplomatic relations with 183 sovereign states, and also with the European Union, and the Sovereign Military Order of Malta, as well as having relations of a special character with the Palestine Liberation Organization; 69 of the diplomatic missions accredited to the Holy See are situated in Rome. The Holy See maintains 180 permanent diplomatic missions abroad, of which 74 are non-residential, so that many of its 106 concrete missions are accredited to two or more countries or international organizations. The diplomatic activities of the Holy See are directed by the Secretariat of State (headed by the Cardinal Secretary of State), through the Section for Relations with States. There are 12 internationally recognized states with which the Holy See does not have relations. (Note: Afghanistan, Bhutan, Brunei, Comoros, Laos, the Maldives, North Korea, the People's Republic of China, Saudi Arabia, Somalia, Tuvalu and Vietnam.) The Holy See is the only European subject of international law that has diplomatic relations with the government of the Republic of China (Taiwan) as representing China, rather than the government of the People's Republic of China (see Holy See–Taiwan relations).

The British Foreign and Commonwealth Office speaks of Vatican City as the "capital" of the Holy See, although it compares the legal personality of the Holy See to that of the Crown in Christian monarchies and declares that the Holy See and the state of Vatican City are two international identities. It also distinguishes between the employees of the Holy See (2,750 working in the Roman Curia with another 333 working in the Holy See's diplomatic missions abroad) and the 1,909 employees of the Vatican City State. The British Ambassador to the Holy See uses more precise language, saying that the Holy See "is not the same as the Vatican City State. ... (It) is the universal government of the Catholic Church and operates from the Vatican City State." This agrees exactly with the expression used by the website of the United States Department of State, in giving information on both the Holy See and the Vatican City State: it too says that the Holy See "operates from the Vatican City State".

The Holy See is a member of various international organizations and groups including the International Atomic Energy Agency (IAEA), International Telecommunication Union, the Organization for Security and Co-operation in Europe (OSCE), the Organisation for the Prohibition of Chemical Weapons (OPCW) and the United Nations High Commissioner for Refugees (UNHCR). The Holy See is also a permanent observer in various international organizations, including the United Nations General Assembly, the Council of Europe, UNESCO (United Nations Educational, Scientific and Cultural Organization), the World Trade Organization (WTO), and the Food and Agriculture Organization (FAO).

=== Relationship with Vatican City and other territories ===
The Holy See participates as an observer to African Union, Arab League, Council of Europe, the Non-Aligned Movement (NAM), Organization of American States, International Organization for Migration and in the United Nations and its agencies FAO, ILO, UNCTAD, UNEP, UNESCO, UN-HABITAT, UNHCR, UNIDO, UNWTO, WFP, WHO, WIPO. and as a full member in IAEA, OPCW, Organization for Security and Co-operation in Europe (OSCE).

Although the Holy See is closely associated with Vatican City, the independent territory over which the Holy See is sovereign, the two entities are separate and distinct. After the Italian seizure of the Papal States in 1870, the Holy See had no territorial sovereignty. In spite of some uncertainty among jurists as to whether it could continue to act as an independent personality in international matters, the Holy See continued in fact to exercise the right to send and receive diplomatic representatives, maintaining relations with states that included the major powers Russia, Prussia, and Austria-Hungary.

Where, in accordance with the decision of the 1815 Congress of Vienna, the Nuncio was a member of the Diplomatic Corps and its dean, this arrangement continued to be accepted by the other ambassadors. In the course of the 59 years during which the Holy See held no territorial sovereignty, the number of states that had diplomatic relations with it, which had been reduced to 16, increased to 29.

The State of the Vatican City was created by the Lateran Treaty in 1929 to "ensure the absolute and visible independence of the Holy See" and "to guarantee to it indisputable sovereignty in international affairs." Archbishop Jean-Louis Tauran, the Holy See's former Secretary for Relations with States, said that Vatican City is a "minuscule support-state that guarantees the spiritual freedom of the Pope with the minimum territory".

The Holy See, not Vatican City, maintains diplomatic relations with states. Foreign embassies are accredited to the Holy See, not to Vatican City, and it is the Holy See that establishes treaties and concordats with other sovereign entities. When necessary, the Holy See will enter into a treaty on behalf of Vatican City.

Under the terms of the Lateran Treaty, the Holy See has extraterritorial authority over various sites in Rome and two Italian sites outside of Rome, including the Pontifical Palace at Castel Gandolfo. The same authority is extended under international law over the Apostolic Nunciature of the Holy See in a foreign country.

== Military ==
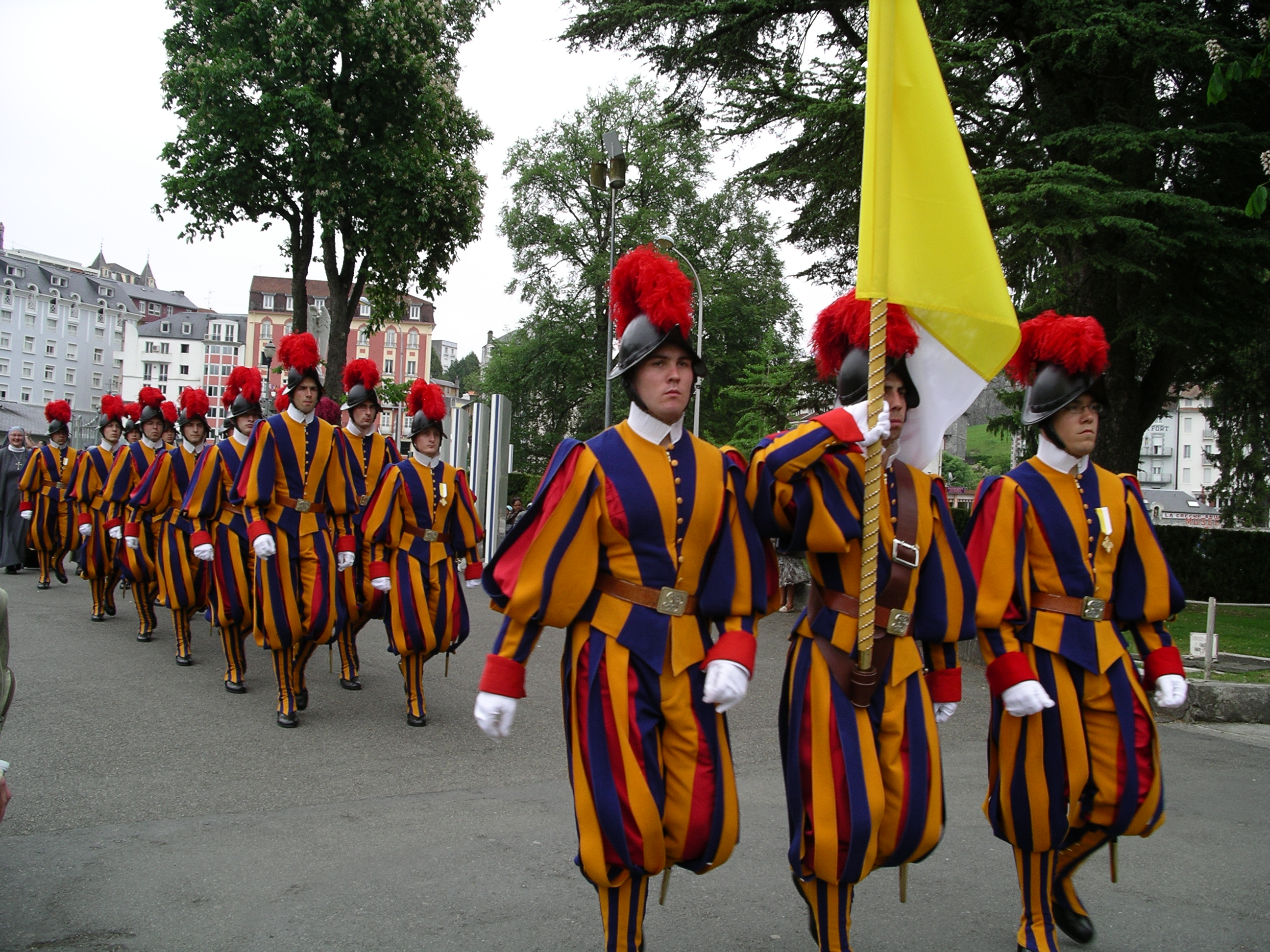
The Swiss Guard on patrol

Like various European powers, earlier popes recruited Swiss mercenaries as part of an army. The Pontifical Swiss Guard was founded by Pope Julius II in January 1506 as the personal bodyguards of the Pope and continues to fulfill that function. It is listed in the Annuario Pontificio under "Holy See", not under "State of Vatican City".

As of 2026, the Guard has a fixed number of a 135 members. Recruitment is arranged by a special agreement between the Holy See and Switzerland. All recruits must be Catholic, unmarried males with Swiss citizenship who have completed basic training with the Swiss Armed Forces with certificates of good conduct, be between the ages of 19 and 30, and be at least 175 centimetres (5 feet 9 inches) in height.

Members are armed with small arms and the traditional halberd, and trained in bodyguarding tactics.

The police force in Vatican City, known as the Corps of Gendarmerie of Vatican City, belongs to the city state, not to the Holy See.

The Holy See signed the UN treaty on the Prohibition of Nuclear Weapons, a binding agreement for negotiations for the total elimination of nuclear weapons.

== Coat of arms ==
(A variant of the) Arms of the Holy See

Arms of Vatican City State

The arms of the Holy See have the gold key in bend and the silver key in bend sinister, as in the sede vacante coat of arms and in the external ornaments of the papal coats of arms of individual popes. The reversed arrangement of the keys was chosen for the arms of the newly founded Vatican City State in 1929.

The coat of arms of the Holy See has no background shield, as can be seen on its official website and on the Holy See passports.

== See also ==
- Global organisation of the Catholic Church
- Index of Vatican City-related articles
- Patriarchate
- Petitions to the Holy See
- Pontifical academy
- See of Constantinople
- Sovereign Military Order of Malta
