= Ponte d'Augusto =

Ponte d'Augusto may refer to the following bridges in Italy:

- Ponte d'Augusto (Narni)
- Ponte d'Augusto (Rimini)
