= Byzantine Corridor =

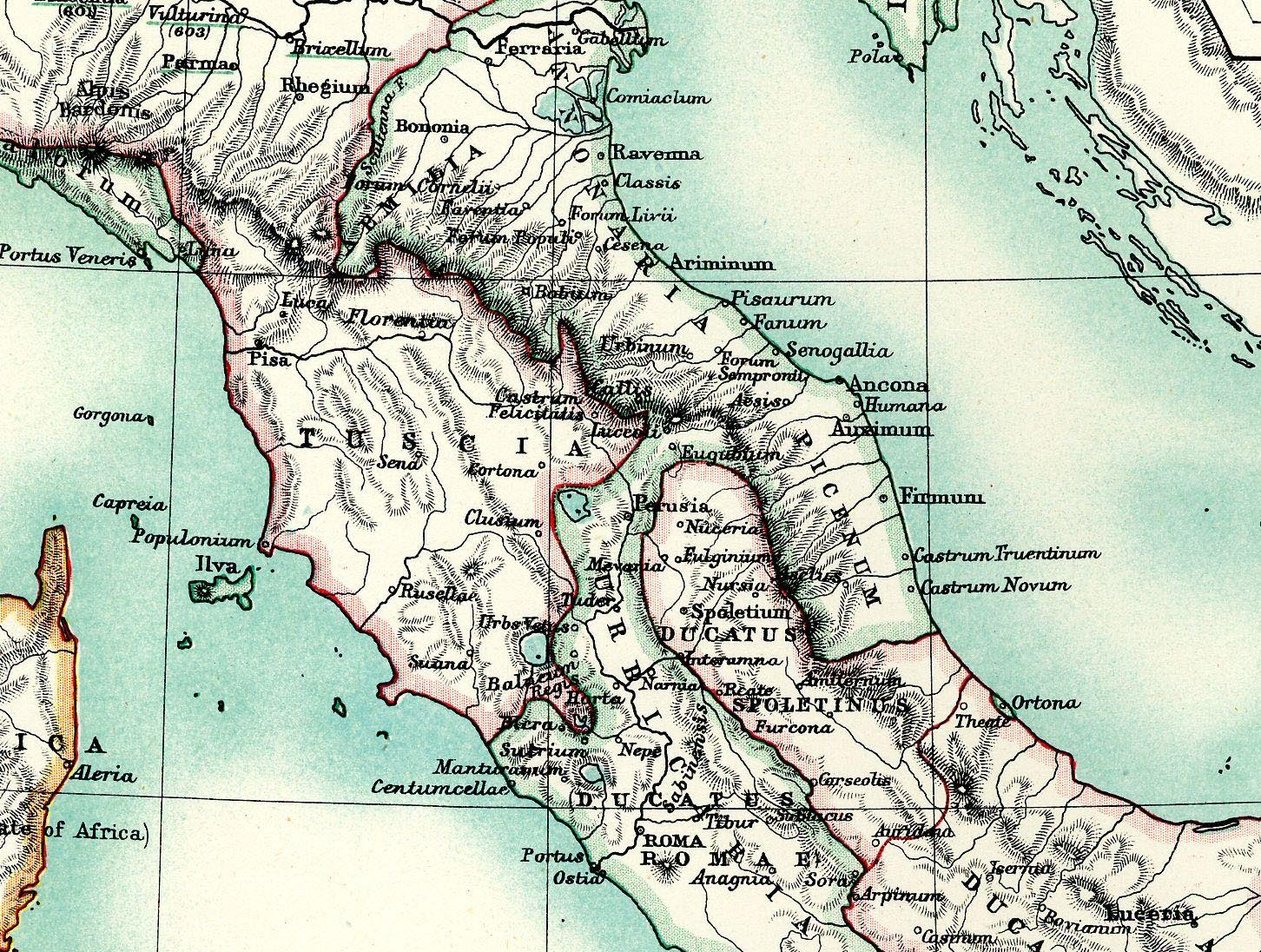
The Byzantine Corridor (c. 600 A.D.)

The Byzantine corridor was a narrow strip of territory in central Italy under the control of the Byzantine Empire during the early Middle Ages. It linked the imperial possessions around Rome with those of the Exarchate of Ravenna, providing a land route between the two most important Byzantine strongholds on the Italian peninsula.

The corridor assumed strategic importance after the Lombards seized much of northern and central Italy, cutting the direct passage along the Via Flaminia. Control of the corridor was essential for the Byzantines to maintain communications, supply lines, and political authority between Rome and Ravenna.

== History ==
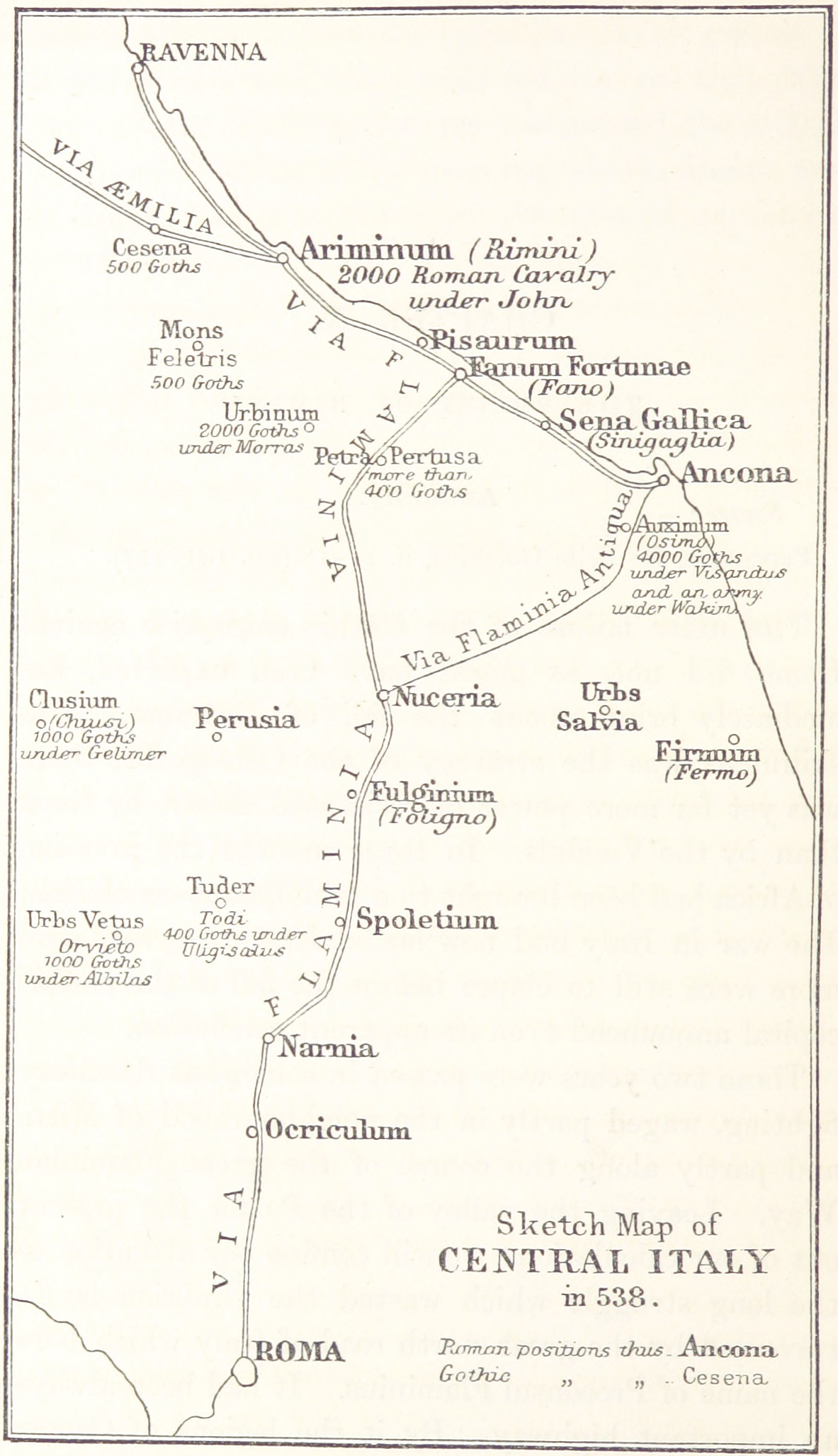
Via Flaminia from Rome to Ravenna

The land communication between the Exarchate, the Pentapolis and Rome was guaranteed by the Via Flaminia that crossed the Apennines and the Tiber Valley. For its strategic relevance, this route was for the Byzantines a vital corridor wedged between the Lombard Kingdom and the Duchy of Spoleto, and was heavily defended by a system of castra.

Following the Lombard invasion of 568 and the rise of the Duchy of Spoleto, the Via Amerina became a key defensive axis, since the central portion of the Via Flaminia was in Lombard hands. The correspondence of Pope Gregory I and the Historia Langobardorum of Paul the Deacon describe intense fighting in the 590s for control of the corridor. In 592–593 the exarch Romanus retook a series of towns along the Via Amerina, including Sutri, Todi, Amelia, and Perugia, though he was forced to withdraw troops from Rome itself to reinforce Narni and Perugia. Despite further Lombard counter-attacks, truces of 598 and 601 preserved Byzantine control of the route.

The Via Amerina thus provided the main substitute for the Flaminia. Beginning from the Via Cassia north of Baccano, the route crossed the Tiber at Orte and continued through Umbria via Todi to Perugia. From there, travellers could rejoin the secure section of the Flaminia either through Gubbio or through Gualdo Tadino, retaken by the Byzantines in 599. Fortifications were established along this road, including defenses over the mountain passes between Perugia and Fossombrone, ensuring that a viable connection between Rome and Ravenna remained open despite political fragmentation in Umbria.

The situation changed under the Lombard king Liutprand (712–744), whose campaigns in central Italy once again endangered the Rome–Ravenna corridor. In the 720s Narni and Otricoli were seized, while later advances brought the loss of Amelia, Orte, Bomarzo, and Bieda. These incursions materially weakened the duchy of Rome and foreshadowed the city’s increasing political independence from Byzantine Ravenna.

In the late 8th century the corridor again became contested, particularly during the conflict between Pope Adrian I and the Lombard king Desiderius. In 772 the Lombards besieged Rome and towns along the corridor. Adrian appealed to Charlemagne, who defeated the Lombards in 774 and annexed their kingdom. This brought most of northern and central Italy under Frankish and papal control, ending the corridor’s role as a Byzantine land link between Rome and Ravenna.

== Route ==
The corridor followed a route described in the 7th century by the Anonymous of Ravenna. Starting from Ravenna, it passed through Forlì, Forlimpopoli, Sarsina, Urbino, Fossombrone, Scheggia, Gubbio, and Perugia. From there, it continued along the ancient Via Amerina through Amelia, Orte, and Nepi, joining the Via Cassia and proceeding via Baccano and Veii to Rome.

An alternative route branched off at Scheggia and ran through Luceoli (modern Cantiano), Cagli, Fossombrone, Fano, Pesaro, Rimini, and back to Ravenna.

== Textual attestations ==
The Byzantine corridor is also attested in contemporary hagiography. The Acta sancti Terentiani of Todi, written before the Carolingian period, refers explicitly to the “Byzantine corridor connecting Rome to Ravenna” and situates its narrative within this geopolitical framework.

== See also ==
- Byzantine Italy
