= Carsulae =

Archeological site in Italy

- Location within Umbria
- 42°38′23.25″N 12°33′25.75″E
- Type: Settlement
- Cultures: Roman
- Region: Umbria (Province of Terni)

Site notes
- Condition: Ruined
- Public access: Yes

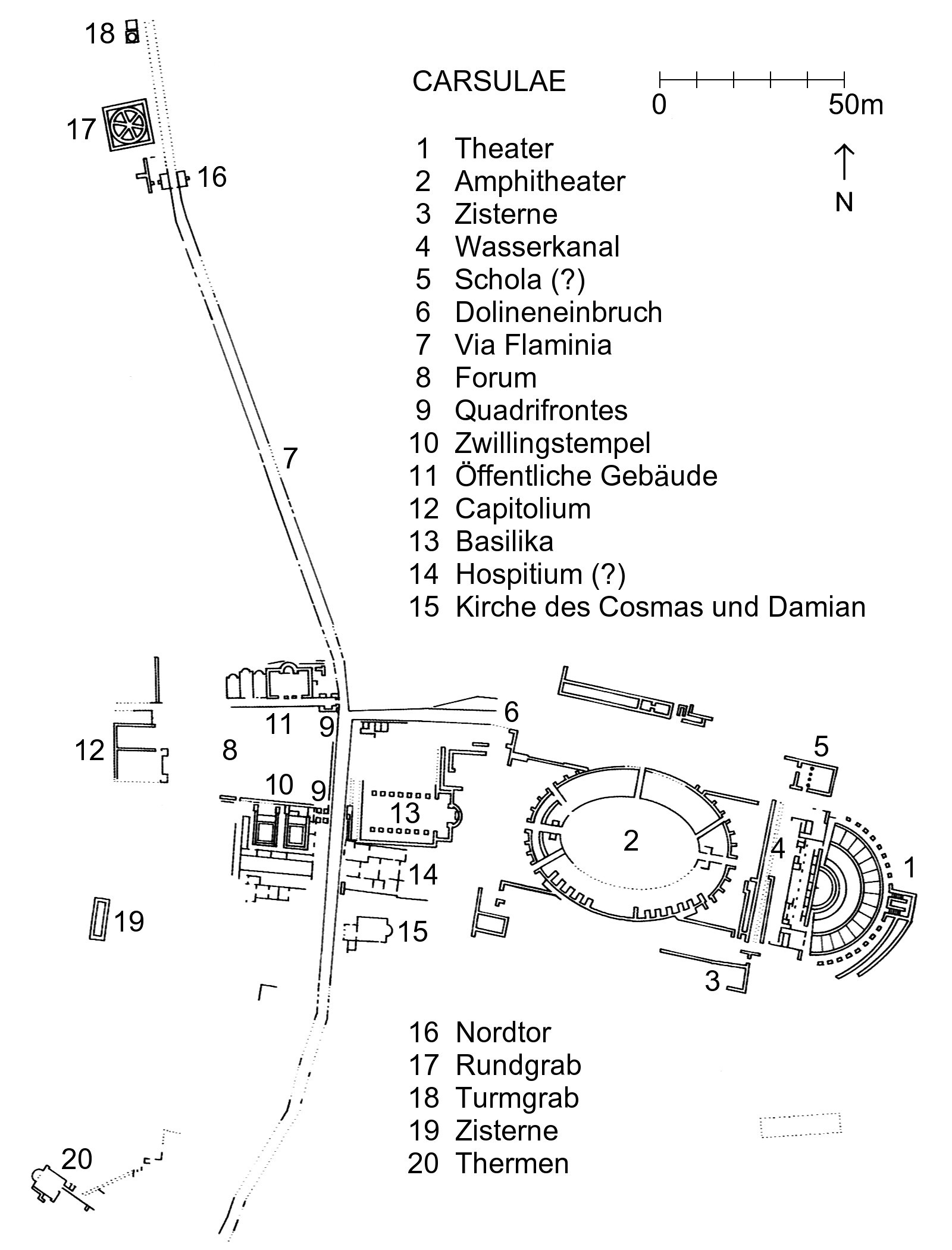
Carsulae Plan

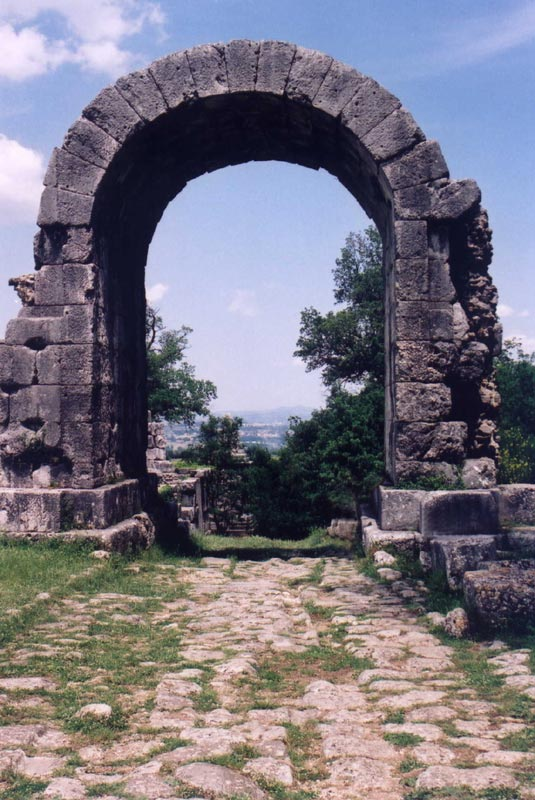
Arco di Traiano (also called the Arch of San Damiano) & the Via Flaminia

Carsulae is an archaeological site in the region of Umbria in central Italy. It is located approximately 4 kilometres (2.5 mi) north of San Gemini, a small comune in the province of Terni.

== Origins and History ==
Most historians fix the town's foundation about 220-219 BC. with the building of the ancient Roman road, the via Flaminia. Given the pattern of pre-Roman settlements in the area it is possible that some form of earlier Umbrian settlement existed at this site.

When the via Flaminia was first built, its western branch proceeded north from Narni (ancient Narnia), sparking the development not only of Carsulae, but also of other locations including Bevagna (ancient Mevania). This branch of the road courses through a gently rolling upland plain at the foot of the Martani mountain range, an area that had been heavily populated since the middle of the Bronze Age. The original course of the via Flaminia, the western branch proceeded from Narni past modern San Gemini, Carsulae, modern Acquasparta, the Vicus Martis Tudertium (near Massa Martana), Bevagna and Foligno (ancient Fulginiae). The later eastern branch proceeded from Narni to Terni (ancient Interamna Nahars), north to Spoleto (ancient Spoletium), then past Trevi and finally to Foligno.

During the age of Emperor Augustus, Carsulae became a Roman municipium. During his reign a number of major works were initiated, eventually including the amphitheater, most of the forum, and the marble-clad Arch of Trajan (now called the Arco di San Damiano). During its "golden age" Carsulae, supported by agricultural activity in the surrounding area, was prosperous and wealthy. Its bucolic setting, its large complex of mineralized thermal baths, theaters, temples and other public amenities, attracted wealthy and even middle class "tourists" from Rome.

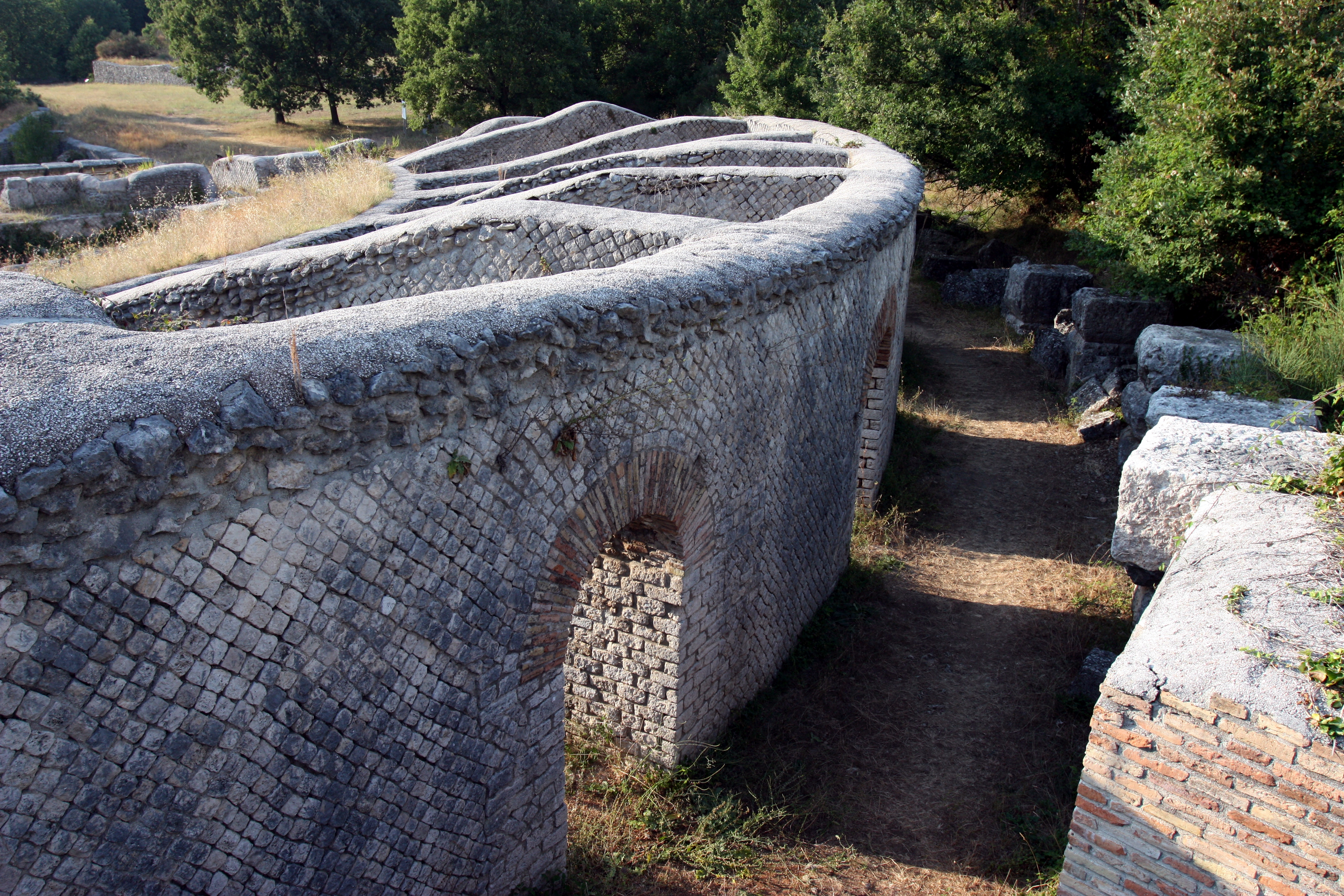
The Augustan theater

While many of the other mentioned towns and cities on the two branches of the old Roman road continue to exist, nothing but ruins remains of Carsulae, which was abandoned and never resettled. In the early Middle Ages, from the 4th or 12th century there is evidence that a small settlement continued, for example the church of San Damiano that still stands today, was built for a small community of nuns on the foundations of an earlier Roman building.

For centuries Carsulae was mostly used as a quarry for building materials by nearby towns like San Gemini, Acquasparta, Massa Martana, Terni, and Cesi, where Roman tombstones may be seen built into the former church of S. Andrea. In this period Carsuale reverts to agricultural use without the construction of any major buildings. Recently archaeologists have been able to map the city with considerable detail without the hindrance of more recent structures overlaying the ancient city.

No one knows the precise reasons why Carsulae was abandoned, but there are four reasons that seem plausible a) that it was destroyed and the site made inhospitable by an earthquake (however, most viable cities hit by earthquakes are rebuilt), b) that it lost its importance and becomes increasingly impoverished because most of the north–south traffic used East branch of the Via Flaminia (Terni, Spoleto, Foligno), c) Carsuale was built in a valley without defensive walls, in the early Middle Ages people tend to move to better defended settlements due to the political instability that sets in. J.B. Ward-Perkins suggested another effect of increasingly unsettled third century, when the very trunk roads that had been economic lifelines became access roads for hordes of marauders: "Henceforth the tendency must have been to move away from the roads, until by the Middle Ages the roads themselves were as bare of settlement as they had been when they were first built.", d) In the 6th - 8th Century during the period of the "Longobard Corridor" the Western branch of the Via Flaminia is blocked by a conflictual border between the Imperial Territory and the Duchy of Spoleto, In this period most north–south traffic moves to the West along the Via Amerina.

== Excavations ==
Haphazard excavations took place in the 16th century under the direction of Duke Federico Cesi, who sought decorative elements for his palace in Acquasparta. In the 17th century under the Pope Pius VI the first systematic excavations were started in 1783 under Count Sebastiano Graziani of Terni, A. J. Milli in 1800 makes a list of finds discovered in Carsulae during those excavations.

In 1951, the ruins came under modern methodical archaeological exploration by then "soprintendente" to archaeological heritage for Umbria, Umberto Ciotti. Significant additional work was also done in 1972.

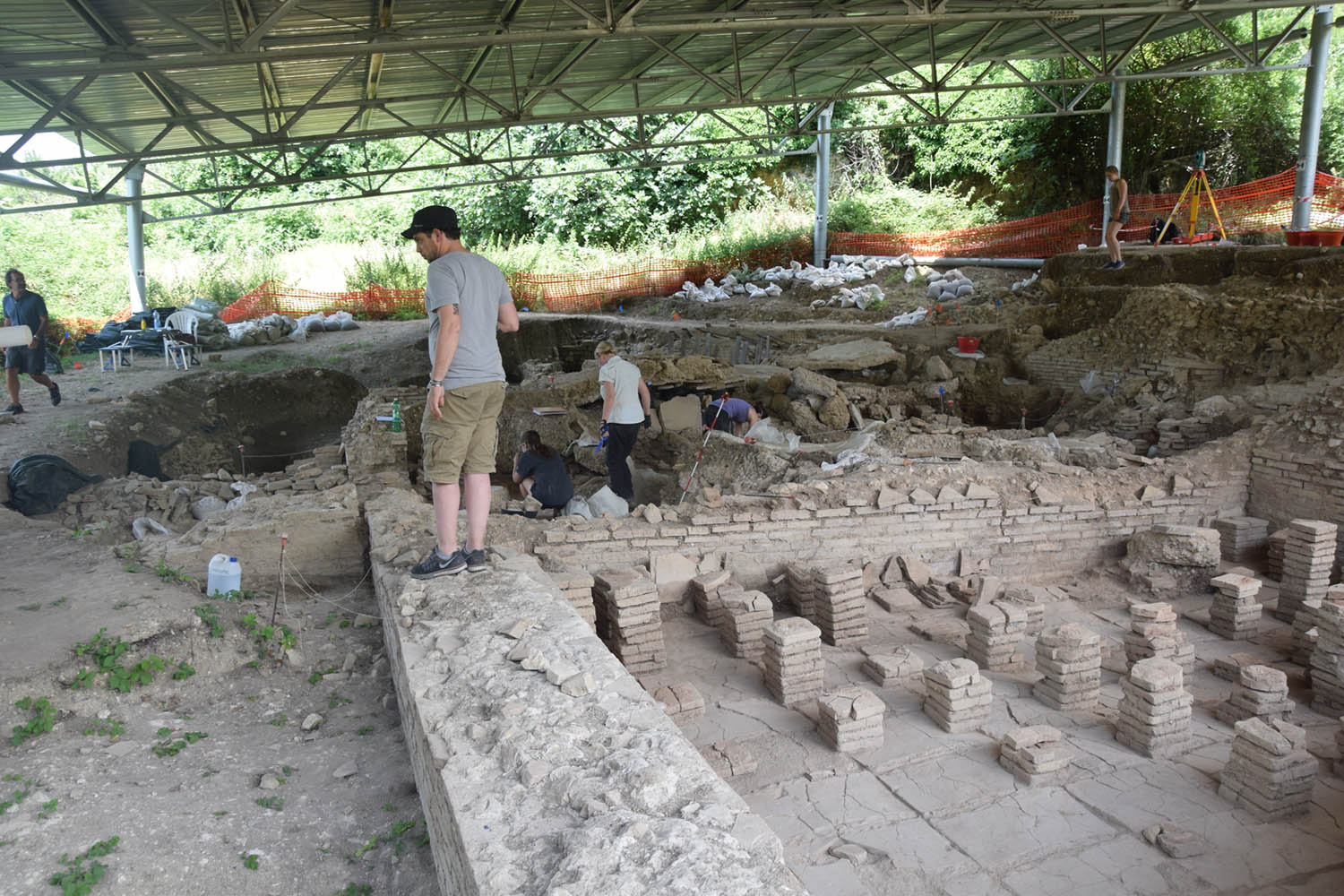
Carsuale, Roman bath excavations in 2016 view of the pilae in hypocaust of tepidarium.

In 2004, after a thirty-year pause in excavation, under the supervision of inspector Paolo Bruschetti, a new excavation campaign was reopened at the Roman Baths directed by Prof. Jane Whitehead of Valdosta State University with the collaboration of the Associazione per la Valorizzazione del Patrimonio Storico San Gemini.

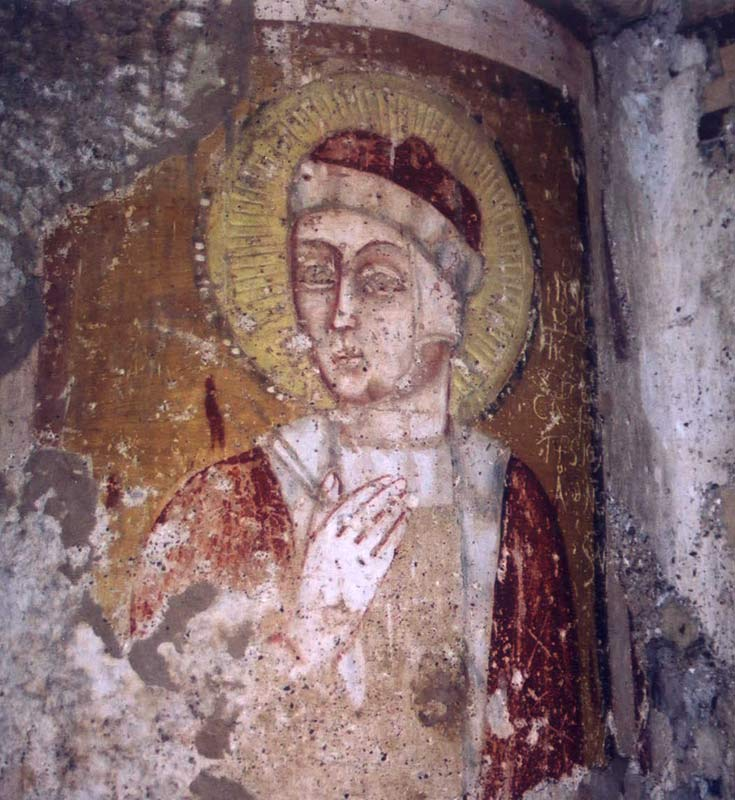
Fresco in the Chiesa di San Damiano

Recent excavations of a large rich Roman domus from the 1st c. BC, facing the forum have revealed peristyles, nymphaea and complex private baths, and also refined mosaic floors. It is testimony to the city’s major role in the Roman urban system. mosaics, made in black and white and characterized by geometric decorations in an extraordinarily well-preserved state, document the high architectural and decorative level of the building. The monochrome geometric mosaics discovered so far extend to half of the total area and their quality make significant impacts on the understanding of late-republican construction here.

== Monuments ==
1. Via Flaminia. The western branch of the ancient Roman road passed through Carsulae. The via Flaminia was the "main street" of the city, and the stretch that runs through the city features sidewalks and gutters.
2. Chiesa di San Damiano, first built in paleo-Christian times on the remains of a Roman building whose original purpose is unknown. Remnants of this building are still in evidence on the south side of the church. The primitive church was a rectangular space with an apse. A portico and two interior colonnades were added during the 11th century using materials gathered from the site, including items that probably decorated the Basilica or were architectural pieces from the Forum.
3. Basilica, the public meeting hall for the citizens of Carsulae. The interior hall, which is rectangular, has a central nave and two side aisles separated by rows of columns. The apse at the far end would have held a magistrate's chair, used to arbitrate or adjudicate disputes and dispense justice.
4. Public Baths, mineralized, thermal baths.
5. Cistern, now an Antiquarium, held water for use by the people of the town.
6. Temples. Two temples, sometimes called the "twin temples" were devoted to the gods of two unknown Roman divinities. Only their diases, sheathed in pink rock, remain today.
7. The Forum, the main public "square" of the ancient city, built on a terraced structure in and around the Basilica and twin temples. The line of vaulted structures, or "tabernae", near the Forum might have been market stalls or shops.
8. Public buildings. Used for unknown purposes, they probably housed administrative offices for the local government, or served as palaces for aristocratic families. There are four sumptuously decorated rectangular rooms with apses, with marble walls and floors incorporating both marble and opus sectilis.
9. Amphitheatre. Sitting in a natural depression to the east of the via Flaminia, was probably built during the Flavian dynasty. It is built primarily of layers of limestone blocks and bricks.
10. Theatre. It was probably built in the time of Augustus, before the building of the amphitheatre. The primary building material for the theatre was opus reticulatum.
11. Collegium Iuvenum, a college or school for young people.
12. Cistern - Another structure built to contain water for the use of citizens.
13. Arco di Traiano - Arch of San Damiano - Originally consisting of three marble- clad arches, of which only the center arch remains. It was also built during the time of Augustus as a symbolic north entrance to the city.
14. Funerary monument, known as the tumulus, a much restored funerary monument of an aristocratic family, possibly the Furia family. A plaque now kept at the museum in the Palazzo Cesi in Acquasparta may have been taken from this monument.
15. Funerary monument - a less distinguished monument in the necropolis of Carsulae.

== Visitor Information ==
(As of August 2012)

8:30 to 19:30 from April to September (summer period of validity DST) (The ticket office closes at 19.00)

8:30 to 17:30 from October to March (winter period of validity of the daytime) (The ticket office closes at 17.00)

Closed on Christmas Day, 1 January and 1 May

Ticket price: €5.00

Discounted ticket: €3.50 (EU citizens between 18 and 25 years, teachers with permanent contracts in state schools and tourist groups over 15 paying units.)

Facilities: Visitor centre with disabled access, "Umberto Ciotti" Visit and Documentation Centre, car parking and café.

== Video materials ==
Video on YouTube with 3D reconstruction of Carsulae.
