= Petitions to the Holy See =

Part of the mode of government of the Catholic Church

Petitions to the Holy See are part of the mode of government of the Catholic Church.
