= The Bridge at Narni =

Painting by Jean-Baptiste-Camille Corot

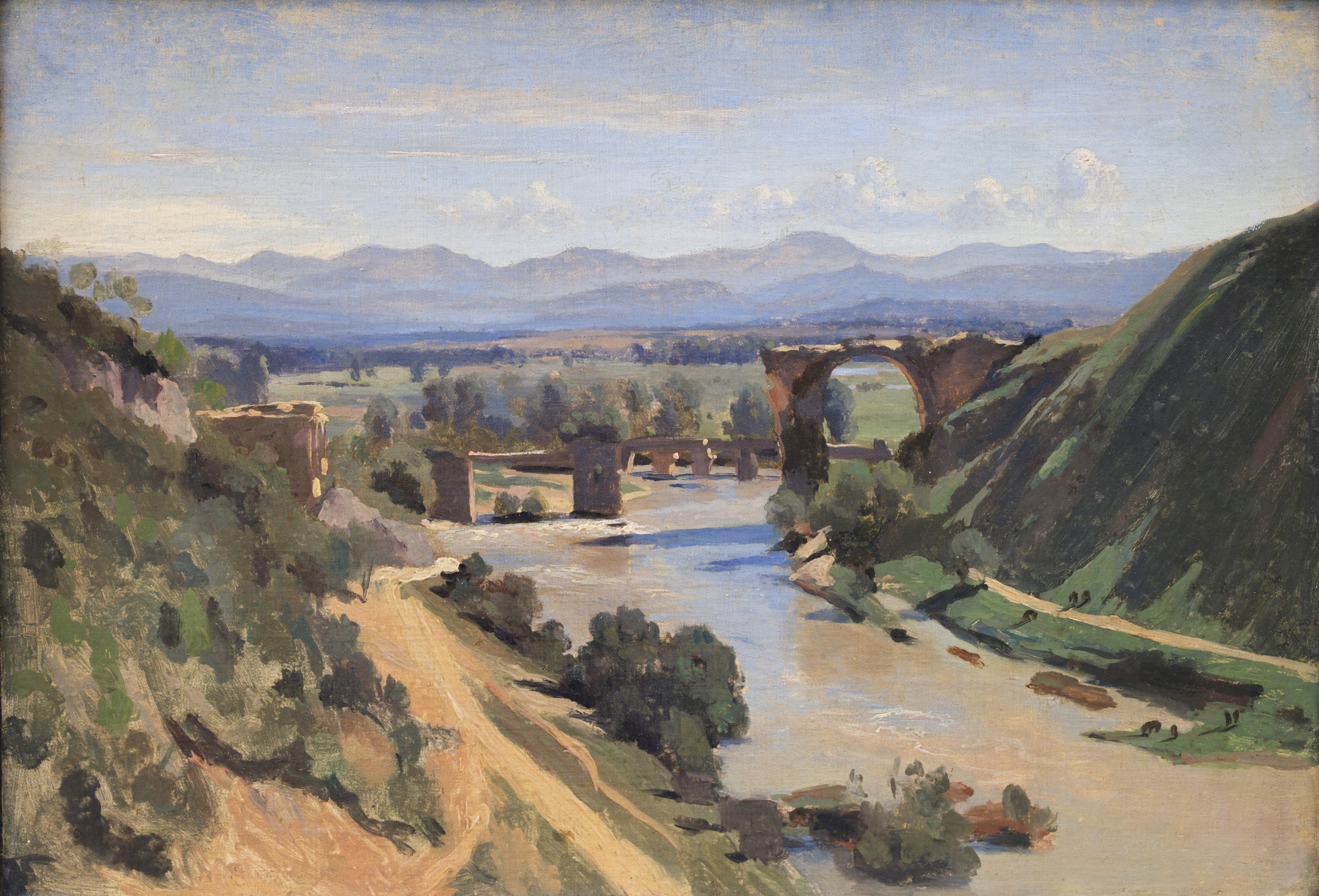
- Artist: Jean-Baptiste-Camille Corot
- Year: 1826
- Type: Oil on paper mounted on canvas
- Dimensions: 34 cm × 48 cm (13 in × 19 in)
- Location: Musée du Louvre, Paris

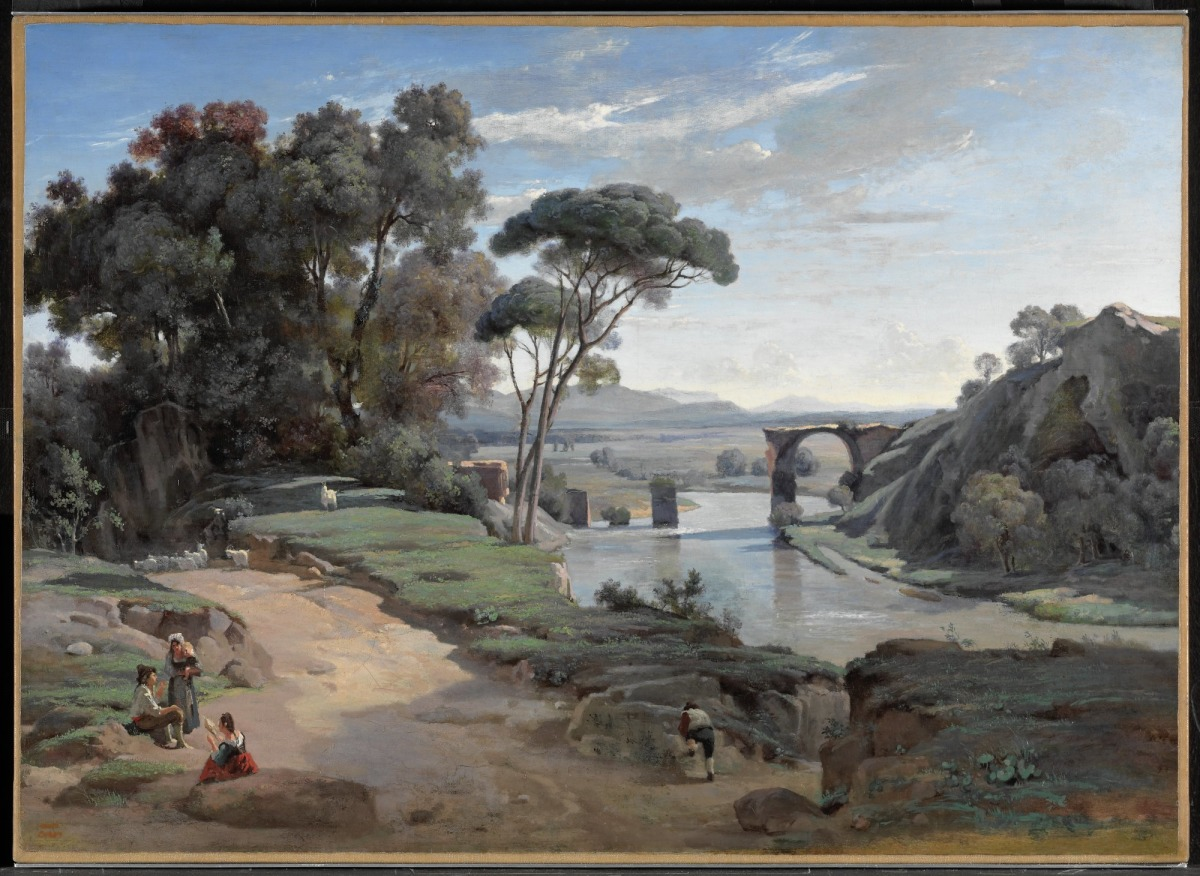
View at Narni, National Gallery of Canada, Ottawa

The Bridge at Narni (French: Le pont de Narni) is an 1826 painting of the Ponte d'Augusto at Narni by French artist Jean-Baptiste-Camille Corot. The painting is on display at the Musée du Louvre in Paris.

It was painted in September 1826 and was the basis for the larger and more finished View at Narni, which was exhibited at the Salon of 1827 and is in the National Gallery of Canada, Ottawa.

The view was not a novel one: in 1821 Corot's teacher, Achille-Etna Michallon had drawn the same scene, as had Corot's friend Ernst Fries in 1826. Art historian Peter Galassi describes Corot's study as a reconciliation of traditional and plein air painting objectives:

So deeply did Corot admire Claude and Poussin, so fully did he understand their work, that from the outset he viewed nature in their terms....In less than a year (since his arrival in Rome) he had realized his goal of closing the gap between the empirical freshness of outdoor painting and the organizing principles of classical landscape composition.
