= Libellus de imperatoria potestate in urbe Roma =

Libellus de imperatoria potestate in urbe Roma is an anonymous Latin treatise on the authority of the Holy Roman Emperor in the city of Rome. It has been dated to between the late 9th century and the middle of the 10th. It was probably written at Spoleto. It survives in one manuscript, which was appended to the contemporary Chronicon of Benedict of Sant'Andrea. (Note: Benedict's Chronicon stresses the dominance of Dukes Alberic I and Alberic II of Spoleto during the papacies of John X and John XI, even incorrectly labelling the dukes as imperial viceroys.)

The Libellus argues for the authority of the Holy Roman Emperor in the so-called "patrimony of Saint Peter". (Note: For the constitutional basis of this authority, cf. Pactum Hludowicianum.) The author clearly sides with the Emperor Louis II against Pope Nicholas I.

Ferdinand Gregorovius calls its author an "Imperialist" and a "partisan", and doubts the accuracy of his claim that "[the emperor's] legate resides in Rome at all times". (Note: Inventum est, ut omnes majores Romae essent imperialies homines, et ut suus missus omni tempore moraretur Romae ("It is found that all the great men of Rome are imperial men, and therefore his [the emperor's] legate all the time resides in Rome").) According to Eleanor Duckett, the author of the Libellus "poured out his feelings into that interesting document".
