= Via Flaminia =

Ancient Roman road

- Flaminian Way
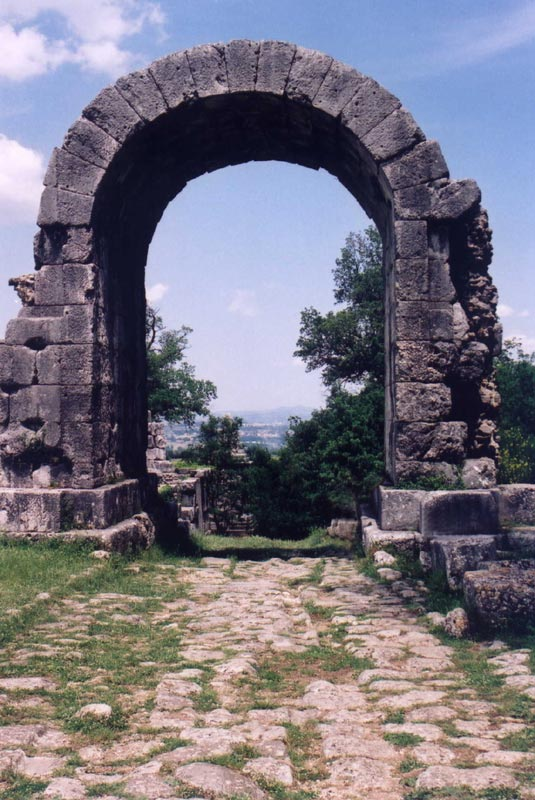
- The road in Carsulae
- Interactive map of Via Flaminia
- Type: Roman road
- Periods: 220 BC
- Location: Rome to Rimini

History
- Built by: Roman Republic, Gaius Flaminius, Roman censor

The Via Flaminia (lit. 'Flaminian Way') was an ancient Roman road leading from Rome over the Apennine Mountains to Ariminum (Rimini) on the coast of the Adriatic Sea. Due to the ruggedness of the mountains, it was the major option the Romans had for travel between Etruria, Latium, Campania, and the Po Valley. The northern section of the road is where Constantine the Great had a vision of the Chi Rho, leading to his conversion to Christianity and the Christianization of the Roman Empire.

Today the same route, still called by the same name for much of its distance, runs parallel to or overlaid by Strada Statale (SS) 3, also called Strada Regionale (SR) 3 in Lazio and Umbria, and Strada Provinciale (SP) 3 in Marche. It leaves Rome, goes up the Val Tevere ("Valley of the Tiber") and into the mountains at Castello delle Formiche, ascends to Gualdo Tadino, continuing over the divide at Scheggia Pass, 575 m (1,886 ft) to Cagli. From there it descends the eastern slope waterways between the Tuscan-Emilian Apennines and the Umbrian Apennines to Fano on the coast and goes north, parallel to Highway A14 to Rimini.

== History ==
It was constructed by Gaius Flaminius during his censorship, around 220 BC. Sources mention frequent improvements being made to it during the imperial period. Augustus instituted a general restoration of the roads of Italy, assigning supervision of different regions to various senators. He reserved the Flaminia for himself, and rebuilt all the bridges except the Pons Mulvius, by which it crosses the Tiber, 3 kilometres (2 miles) north of Rome (built by Marcus Aemilius Scaurus in 109 BC), and an unknown Pons Minucius. Triumphal arches were erected in his honour on the former bridge and at Ariminum, the latter of which is still preserved. Vespasian constructed a new tunnel through the pass of Intercisa (Furlo), in AD 77, and Trajan, as inscriptions show, repaired several bridges along the road.

During the period of Roman expansion in the 3rd and 2nd centuries BC, the Flaminia became, with the sea route, a main axis of transportation by which wheat from the Po Valley supplied Rome and central Italy. A number of major battles were fought on or near the Via Flaminia, for example at Sentinum (near the modern Sassoferrato) and near Tadinum (the modern Gualdo Tadino). Constantine the Great's famous Battle of the Milvian Bridge also occurred on the road, after his nearby dream of the Chi Rho (which led to his conversion and that of the Roman Empire to Christianity).

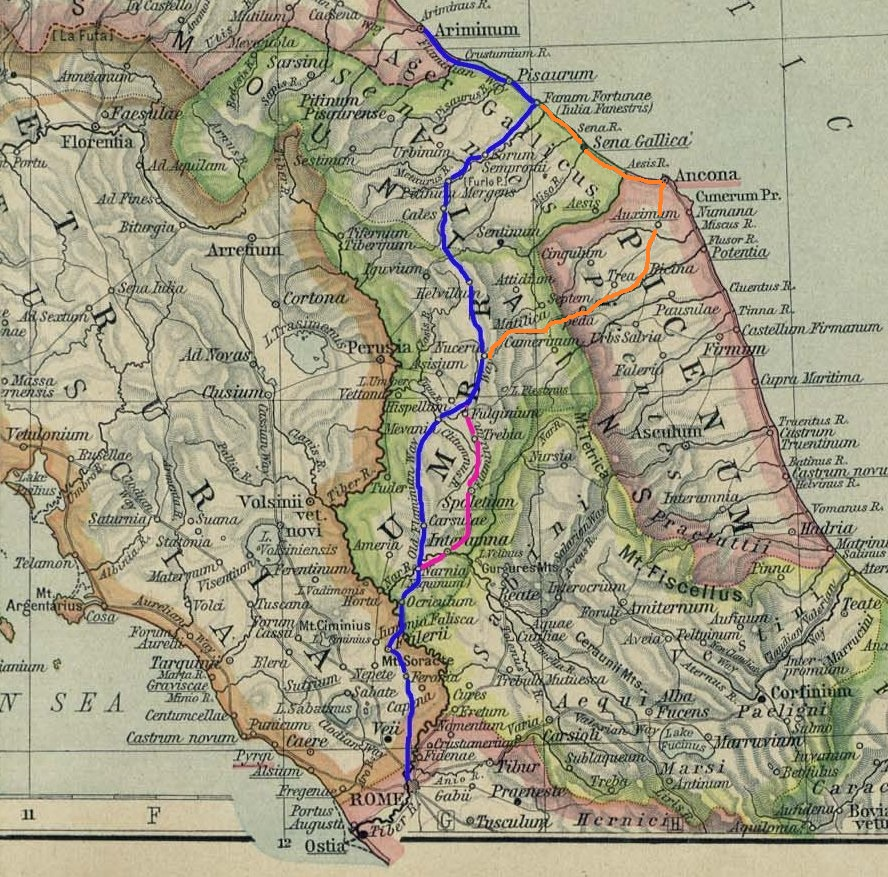
Route of the Via Flaminia; the purple route indicates the Via Flaminia Nova. The orange route indicates the variant that crosses the central part of Marche and reaches the Adriatic Sea in Ancona

In late antiquity the Via Flaminia remained Rome's major artery both to the Adriatic and to Italy north of the Apennines. The Itinerarium Burdigalense and the Priscillianists who had been expelled from their sees both took this route to Rome despite its length.

After the fall of the western Roman Empire the route remained in use, and when the Ostrogothic king Theodahad set out from Ravenna for Rome around 535, a letter of Cassiodorus mentions work done to repair the road. After the emperor Justinian invaded Italy, competition between the Goths and Romans over strongpoints on the road resulted in more activity through a route that ran slightly to the north through Perugia, the old Etruscan Via Amerina. The Lombard conquest ultimately resulted in the breaking of the Via Flaminia. In the late sixth century the Via Flaminia was severed by the establishment of the Lombard Duchy of Spoleto, with the border around contested Narni. In its place was established the Byzantine Corridor, a new route linking Rome and Ravenna that departed both cities on the Via Flaminia but which was forced due to political circumstances to pass through Perugia rather than Spoleto.

In the Middle Ages it was known as the Ravenna road, as it led to the then more important city of Ravenna. Following the end of the Exarchate of Ravenna, it fell into disuse during the Lombard period, but was partially reconstructed in the Renaissance era and continued to be of military importance down to the Napoleonic era and World War II. As the SS 3 (Strada Statale 3) it remains one of the principal highways from Rome to the Adriatic coast.

== Construction features ==
The construction features of the Via Flaminia match those of other major Roman roads. The route was designed to be mostly straight, and the roadbed was wide enough for two carts to pass at the same time, no less than 3.9 metres (13 ft) to 4.1 metres (13 ft) along the Umbrian stretch, which was standard for main roads.

Within settlements, where it formed the main axis, the road was paved, often repaired and adjusted over time; remains are still visible, for example, at Otricoli and Carsulae. In rural areas, it likely did not have full stone paving but a gravel surface, which still ensured durability and easier maintenance. It is unclear whether purpose-built sidewalks were present outside urban areas, unlike in towns.

== Ancient route ==
Via Flaminia map

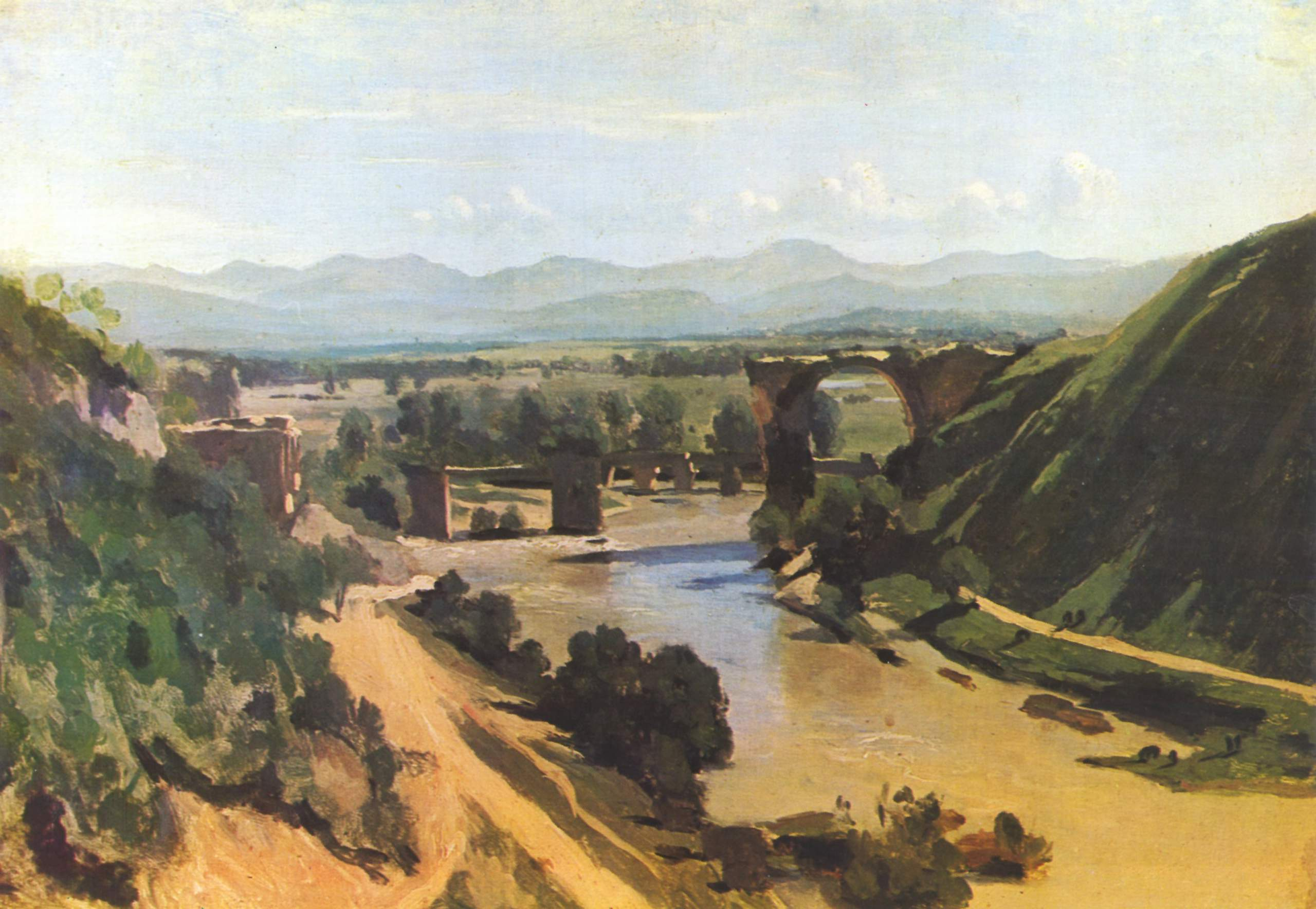
The bridge of Narni in an 1826 painting by Jean-Baptiste-Camille Corot

The Via Flaminia began at the Porta Fontinalis, a gate in the Servian Wall in ancient Rome, on the northern slope of the Capitoline Hill. It followed the Via Lata from the Campidoglio to the Porta Flaminia, a city gate of the Aurelian Walls, and the Piazzale Flaminio. This portion can be considered the urban stretch of the Via Flaminia. The road then crosses the Tiber at the Ponte Milvio. While the Via Cassia split off north, the Via Flaminia veared east before turning north again to follow the Tiber, and continued on to Saxa Rubra and Prima Porta. On a hill to the right of the Via Flaminia, a little beyond Prima Porta, are the ruins of Ad Gallinas, a villa that belonged to Livia, the wife of Augustus.

From there it made its way to Ocriculum (Otricoli) and Narnia (Narni), where it crossed the Nera River by the Ponte d'Augusto, the largest Roman bridge ever built, a splendid four-arched structure to which Martial alludes, one arch of which is still standing. It went on, followed at first by the modern road to Casuentum (San Gemini) which passes over two finely preserved ancient bridges, through Carsulae to the Vicus Martis Tudertium (near modern Massa Martana), then Mevania (Bevagna), and thence to Forum Flaminii (S. Giovanni Profiamma). Later, a more circuitous route from Narnia to Forum Flaminii was adopted, increasing the distance by 12 Roman miles (18 km) and passing by Interamna Nahars (Terni), Spoletium (Spoleto) and Fulginium (Foligno) from which a branch diverged to Perusia (Perugia).

From Forum Flaminii, where the two branches rejoined, the Flaminia went on to Nuceria Camellaria (Nocera Umbra) whence a branch road ran to Septempeda and thence either to Ancona or to Tolentinum (Tolentino) and Urbs Salvia (Urbisaglia) and Helvillum (site uncertain, probably Sigillo, but possibly Fossato di Vico), to cross the main ridge of the Apennines, a temple of Jupiter Apenninus standing at or near the summit of the pass according to one ancient author. From there it descended to Cales (Cagli), where it turned north-east following the gorges of the Burano. The narrowest pass was crossed by means of a tunnel chiseled out of solid rock: a first tunnel apparently of the 3rd century BC was replaced by an adjacent tunnel by Vespasian. This is the modern Gola del Furlo, the ancient name of which, Intercisa, means "cut through" with reference to these tunnels. The modern 2‑lane road, the SS 3 Flaminia, still uses Vespasian's tunnel, the emperor's dedicatory inscription still in place; remnants of the earlier tunnel can also be seen.

The Flaminia emerged from the gorges of the Apennines at Forum Sempronii (Fossombrone) and reached the coast of the Adriatic at Fanum Fortunae (Fano). Thence, it ran north-west through Pisaurum (Pesaro) to Ariminum (Rimini). The total distance from Rome was 210 Roman miles, 296 km (184 mi) by the older road and 222 Roman miles, 328 km (204 mi) by the newer. The road gave its name to a juridical district of Italy from the 2nd century onwards, the former territory of the Senones, which was at first associated with Umbria (with which indeed under Augustus it had formed the sixth region of Italy called Umbria et Ager Gallicus), but which after Constantine was always administered with Picenum.

=== Via Flaminia minor ===
The Via Flaminia minor (Via Flaminia Militare) was a more western route, constructed by Gaius Flaminius (son of the former Gaius Flaminius) in 187 BC from Bononia (Bologna) to Arretium (Arezzo). It gradually fell into disuse, and disappeared after the Middle Ages. Its exact route is unknown although in 1977 Franco Santi and Cesare Agostini claimed to have found remnants, as yet unconfirmed.

== Remains ==
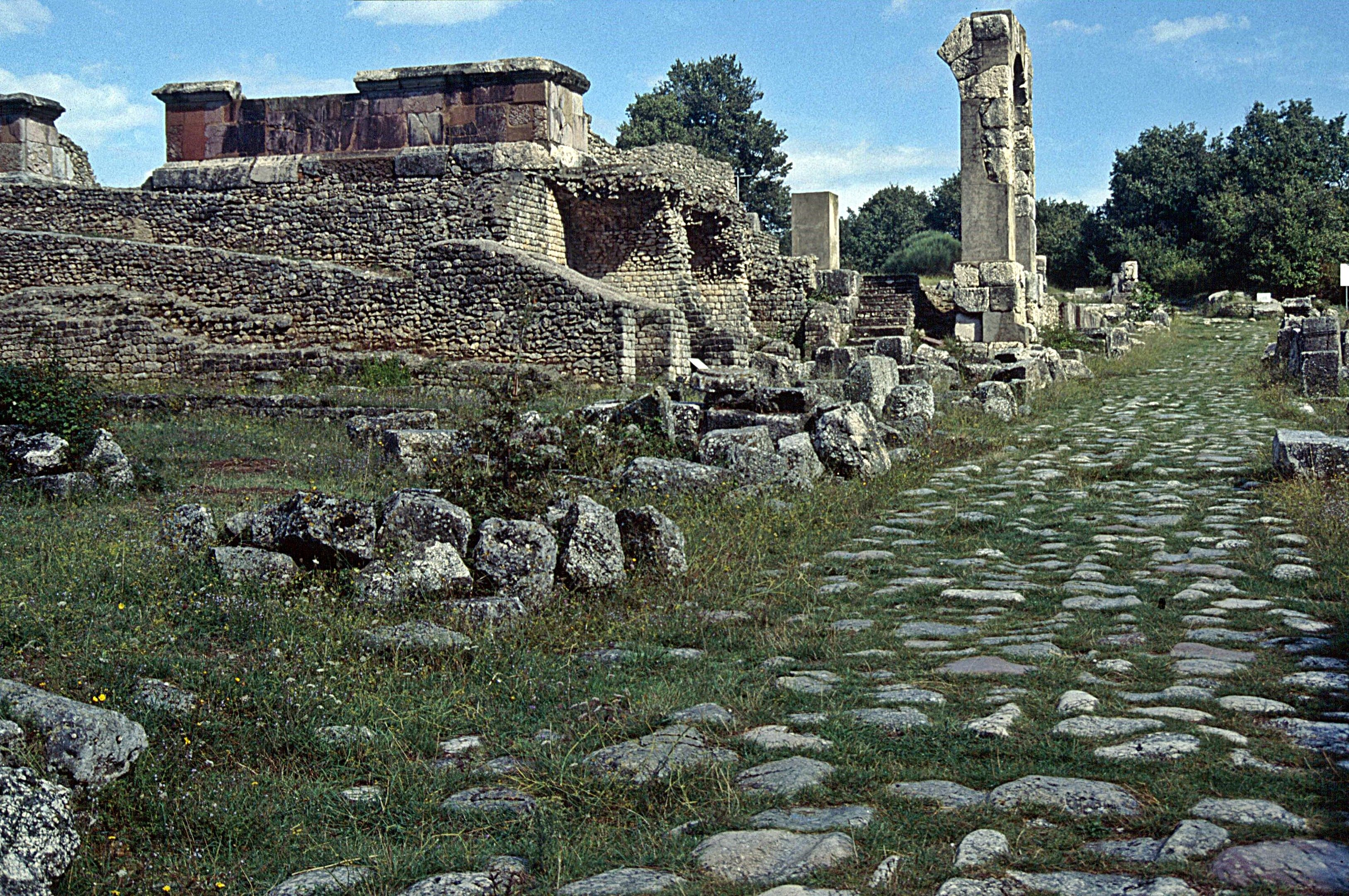
The road passing through Carsulae

Extant remains of the road consist of rare patches of pavement (by far the largest is an intermittent stretch about 800 meters long at Rignano Flaminio in the northern Lazio), but for the most part of bridges, listed here in order from Rome:

- From Rome to Narni:
  - the Milvian Bridge (Ponte Milvio)
  - pons Minucius: crossed the Tiber just before Otricoli, visible until the 18th century;
  - the Pile di Augusto
  - Ponte Sanguinaro S of Narni
  - Retaining walls: supported the road along the hillside up to Narni, including the example at Le Grazie, which still supports the modern state road;
  - Bridge of Augustus: one of the largest structures along the route, crossed the Nera as the road descends into the narrow valley;
- Along the western branch:
  - Ponte Caldaro, damaged in World War II
  - Ponte Calamone both before Sangemini
  - Bridge substructure at Valle Petrosa: in the area of Acquasparta, a surviving section built in polygonal masonry, whose construction method, different from other structures along the route, likely reflects the original design of the 3rd century BC, when the Flaminia was first laid out.
  - Ponte Fonnaia near Acquasparta
  - Square-cut stone bridge: once crossed a stream later diverted from its original course, with the 15th-century church of San Giovanni de' Butris and its rectory partly built on its remains.
  - Church of Santa Maria in Pantano: incorporates most of the surviving remains of the public buildings of Vicus Martis, which the road reaches after a short stretch with a few rural settlements. Beyond Massa Martana, the route becomes less clear.
  - Ponte del Diavolo: a surviving bridge near Osteria del Bastardo.
  - Decumanus maximus of Mevania: was formed by the Via Flaminia, which crossed the city; the original street grid is still preserved. At the edges of the settlement stood many funerary monuments, likely belonging to prominent local figures, placed along the road as visible markers for travelers.
- Along the eastern branch:
  - Although the route can still be traced, only limited archaeological remains survive, mainly in the area of Spoleto.
  - Ponte Sanguinario: rebuilt during the Augustan period, its remains stand outside Spoleto's northern gate;
  - Between Spoleto and Foligno, finds at Campo Salese (Spoleto), Santa Maria di Pietrarossa (Trevi), and Santa Maria in Campis (near Foligno) help trace the course of the road toward Forum Flaminii.
  - scant remains of a bridge at Pontebari

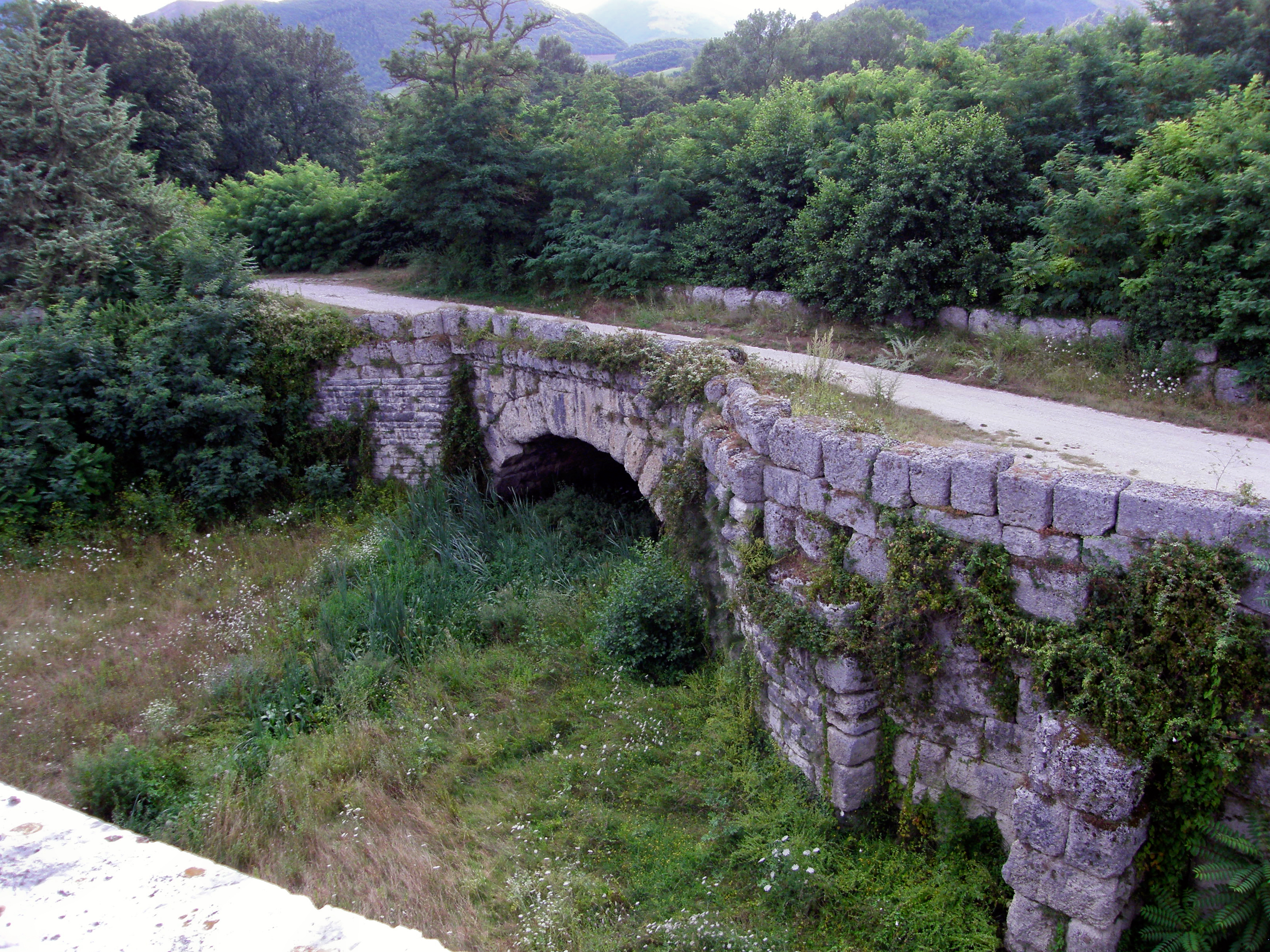
Mallio Bridge at Cagli

- After the branches rejoin at S. Giovanni Profiamma:
  - bridge-like structure at Pieve Fanonica
  - Ponte Centesimo: crosses the Topino River, in whose narrow valley the road runs; nearby, the route is supported by a long viaduct at Capannacce and by a series of structures used to regulate water flow.
  - Ponte marmoreo: marked the road in the territory of Nocera Umbra, together with a long substructure in squared stone at Le Spugne and remains of settlements linked to the road, organized according to the agricultural layout typical of the early Roman imperial period, with necropolises also placed along the route.
  - three bridges in the comune of Fossato di Vico (one of which, however, belongs properly to a branch road off the main trunk of the Flaminia)
  - Ponte Spiano in Costacciaro
  - The final stretch of the Via Flaminia in Umbria is not fully certain, as the route breaks into paths that are often no longer identifiable. Some structures remain, including the so-called Etruscan bridge over the Scirca stream, the Ponte Spiano over the Fontursci stream near present-day Sigillo, and the Ponte Voragine near Scheggia.
  - five bridges in the comune of Cantiano, near Pontedazzo and Pontericcioli
  - Ponte Mallio (or Manlio) at Cagli, which appears to be partly of pre-Roman (Umbrian) construction
  - Tunnel at Furlo Pass

Other notable Roman vestiges along the road, aside from those within the individual towns, include a pair of tower tombs between Bevagna and Foligno; and along the eastern branch of the Flaminia in particular, in the area between Spoleto and Trevi, many small Romanesque churches, partly built of reused Roman stone (spolia) — including a few inscriptions — mark the straight line of the road quite clearly. A small stretch of the road remains in the ruins of Carsulae where it passes through the Arco di Traiano.

== Sport ==
The road was used as part of the individual road race cycling event for the 1960 Summer Olympics in Rome.

In Rome it runs past and gives its name to the Stadio Flaminio sports stadium.

== See also ==
- Roman road
- Roman bridge
- Roman engineering
- Via del Corso
- Piazza del Popolo
