= Bridge of Augustus (Narni) =

Bridge of Augustus (Ponte d'Augusto)
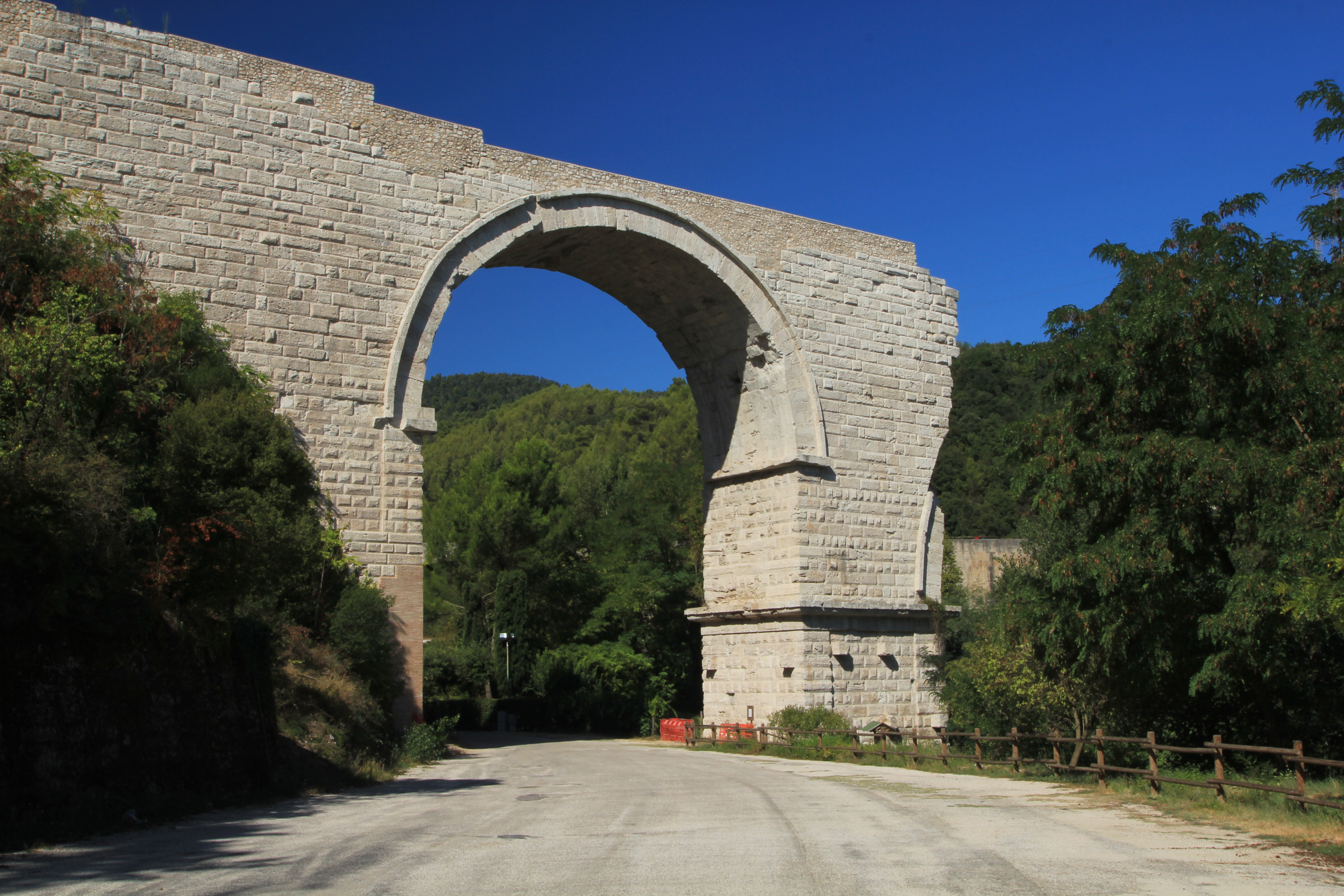
- The remaining arch of the Bridge of Augustus
- Coordinates: 42.524985°N 12.514544°E
- Carries: Flaminian Way
- Crosses: Nera River
- Locale: Narni, Umbria, Italy

Characteristics
- Design: Roman arch bridge
- Material: Stone
- Total length: 160 metres (520 ft)
- Height: 30 metres (98 ft)
- No. of spans: 4 (originally)

History
- Construction start: 27 BC

Location
- Interactive map of Bridge of Augustus (Ponte d'Augusto)

The Bridge of Augustus (Italian "Ponte d’Augusto") is a Roman arch bridge in the Italian city Narni in Umbria, built to carry the Flaminian Way over the river Nera. Of the original four spans of the 160-metre-long (520 ft) bridge, only the southernmost remains standing.

== History ==
The bridge was built under Augustus around 27 BC using marble blocks. The 30 m high structure was one of the largest bridges constructed by the Romans.

According to the Umbrian Superintendence of Archaeological Heritage:

The complexity of the structure and a number of irregularities suggest that its construction was a lengthy affair. Evident signs of ancient restorations reveal structural failures resulting from intense use or from natural calamities. Chronicles from the Middle Ages report collapses caused by floods and earthquakes. Documentation gives a definite date for the collapsing of the third pylon, which occurred in 1855. During the 1970s reinforcement work was done on the bridge. The surviving arch has suffered damage from recent earthquakes, in particular, the 2000 quake. Restoration work is now in progress.

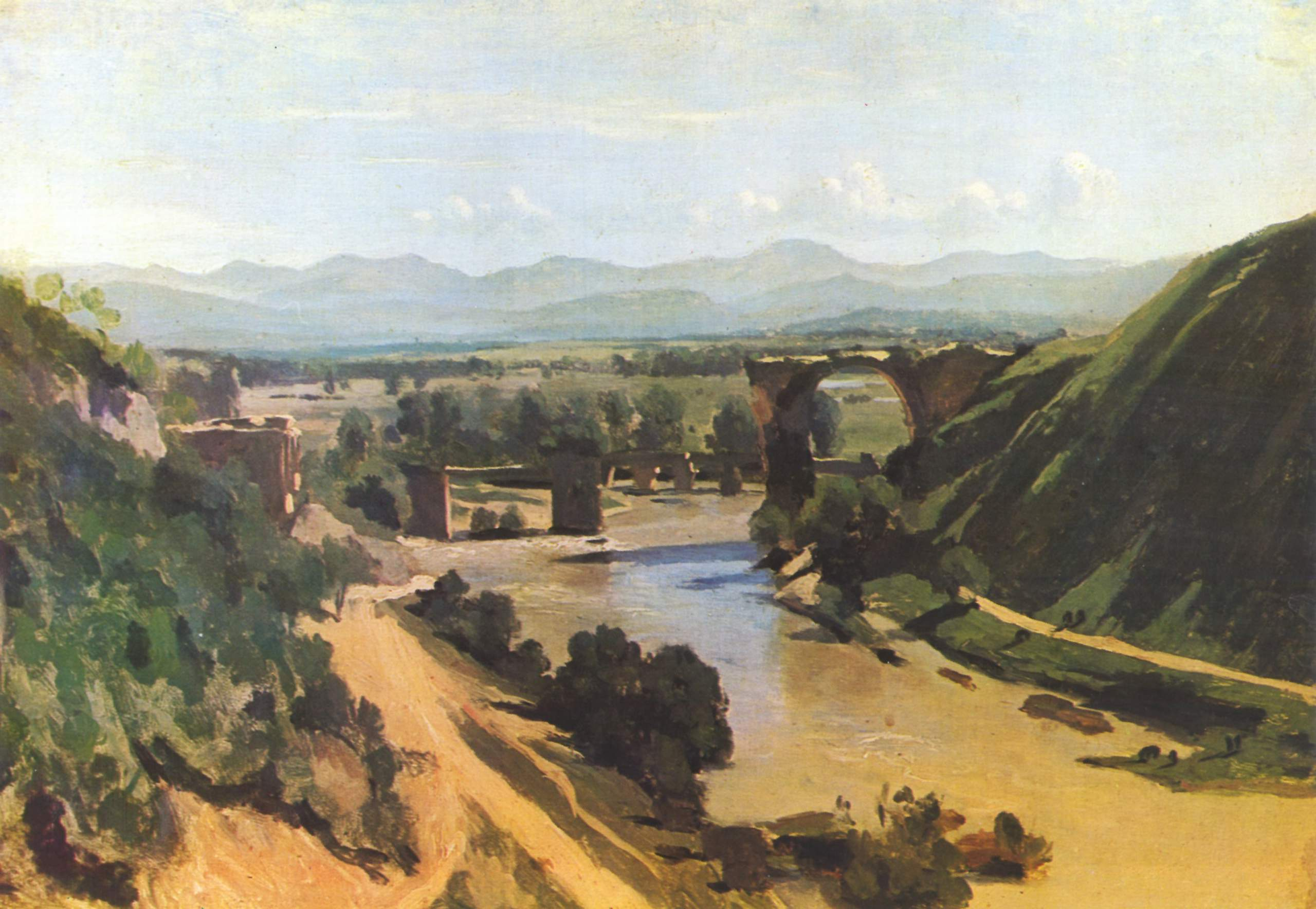
The Bridge at Narni, an 1826 painting by Jean-Baptiste-Camille Corot

The bridge was a popular destination on the Grand Tour.

James Hakewill wrote in A picturesque tour of Italy (1816–1817):

There are few relics of antiquity that impress the traveller with greater ideas of Roman magnificence that the sight of this bridge affords... It is built with large blocks of white marble, neatly squared and fitted in, but without any appearance of cement having been used, or even cramps of iron to connect them together.

Hakewill states that a description of the bridge is to be found in Roma antiqua et restaurata by Biondo, of Forli, 1558 [sic]; and he also quotes from antiquity an epigram of Martial in which the bridge is mentioned.

The English painter J. M. W. Turner made sketches of the bridge in 1819, which are now held by the Tate Gallery.

The French painter Jean-Baptiste-Camille Corot (1796–1875) produced in 1826 the famous painting The Bridge at Narni, which today hangs in the Louvre.

== Dimensions ==
Probable width of the four original spans: 19.20m, 32.10m, 18.00m and 16.00m, of which the first, southernmost arch remains standing.

== See also ==
- List of Roman bridges
