= Via Cassia =

Ancient Roman road

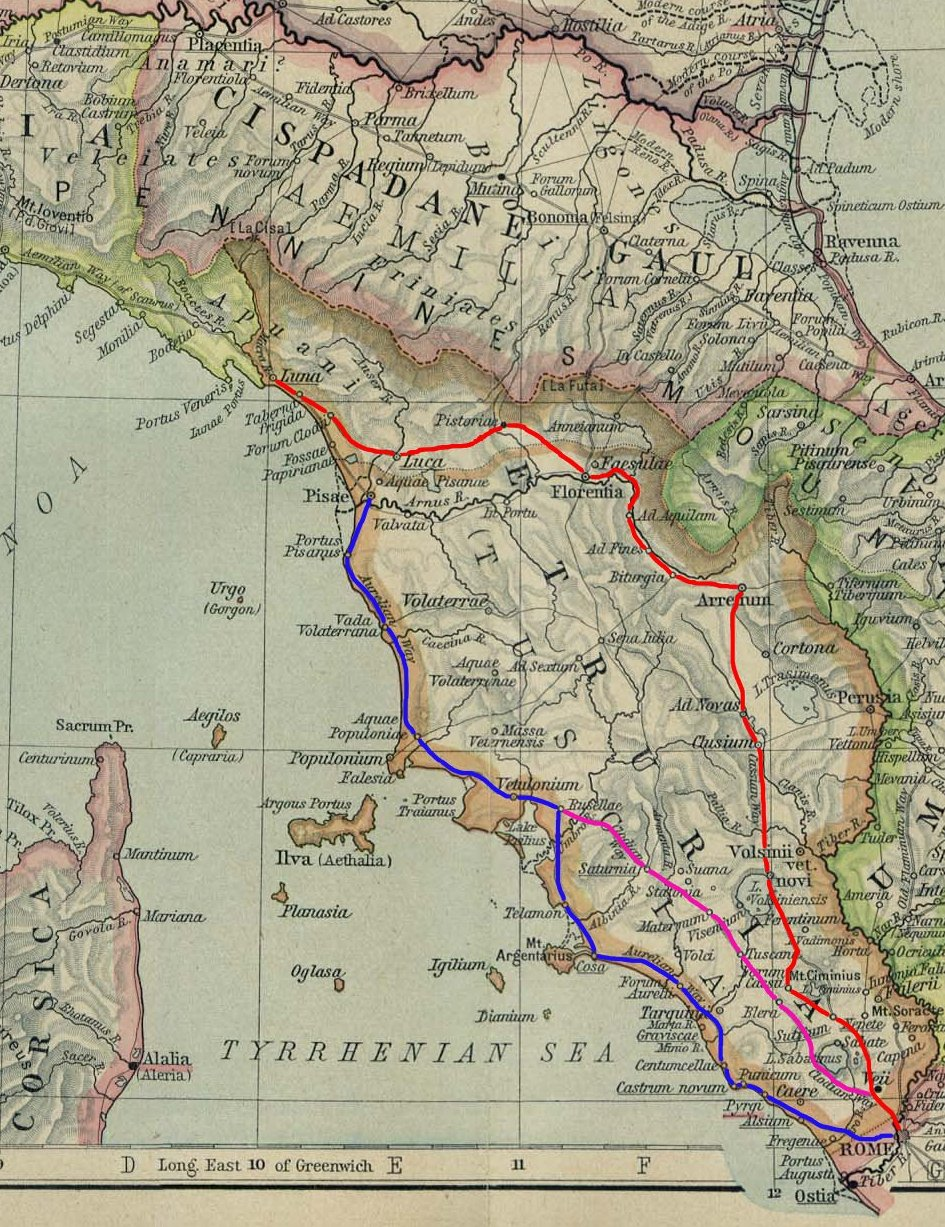
Roman roads of western Italy: Via Cassia is marked in red.

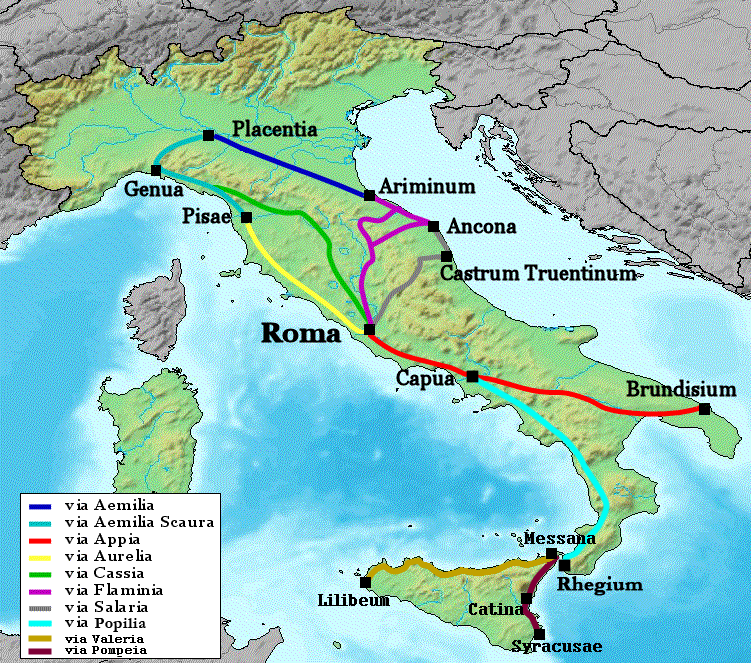
Route of Via Cassia (in green)

The Via Cassia (lit. 'Way of Cassius') was an important Roman road striking out of the Via Flaminia near the Milvian Bridge in the immediate vicinity of Rome and, passing not far from Veii, traversed Etruria. The Via Cassia passed through Baccanae, Sutrium, Volsinii, Clusium, Arretium, Florentia, Pistoria, and Luca, joining the Via Aurelia at Luna.

The Via Cassia intersected other important roads. At mile 11 the Via Clodia diverged north-north-west. At Sette Vene, another road, probably the Via Annia, branched off to Falerii. In Sutrium, the Via Ciminia split off and later rejoined.

The date of its construction is uncertain: it cannot have been earlier than 187 BC, when the consul Gaius Flaminius constructed a road from Bononia to Arretium, which must have coincided with a portion of the later Via Cassia. It is not mentioned by any ancient authorities before the time of Cicero, who in 45 BC speaks of the existence of three roads from Rome to Mutina: the Flaminia, the Aurelia and the Cassia. A milestone of AD 124 mentions repairs to the road made by Hadrian from the boundary of the territory of Clusium to Florentia, a distance of 86 miles (138 km).

== Via Amerina ==
The Via Amerina was a road that broke off from the Via Cassia near Baccanae, and held north through Falerii, Tuder, and Perusia, rejoining the Via Cassia at Clusium. When the incursions of Faroald, the Lombard Duke of Spoleto, cut the Via Flaminia, the lifeline between Rome and Ravenna, the Via Amerina was improved and fortified at intervals, works that represented some of the last road-building carried out in Italy in late antiquity. As the new military and strategic route, the Via Amerina "became the communications core of Imperial Italy and the chief support to the claim that imperial Italy was still extant".

== Bridges ==
There are the remains of several Roman bridges along the road, including the Ponte San Lorenzo and Ponte San Nicolao.

== Sport ==
The road was used as part of the individual road race cycling route for the 1960 Summer Olympics in Rome.

== See also ==
- Roman bridge
- Roman engineering
- Via Trionfale – connects to Via Cassia near Rome
