= Giano dell'Umbria =

- Comune
- Comune di Giano dell'Umbria
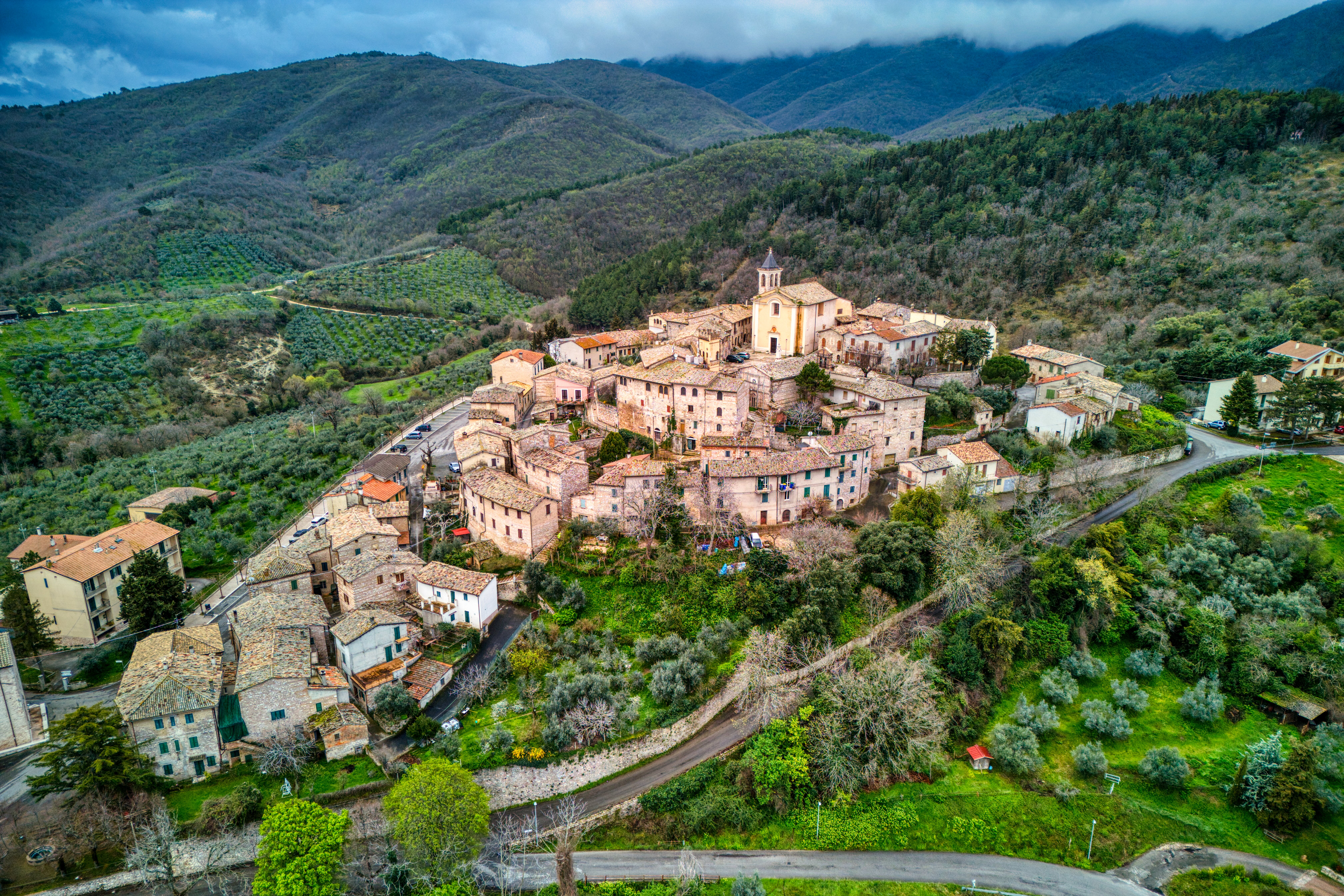
- View of Giano dell'Umbria

- Location within Italy Location within Umbria
- Coordinates: 42.833729°N 12.578094°E
- Country: Italy
- Region: Umbria
- Province: Perugia (PG)

Government
  - Mayor: Marcello Bioli

Area
  - Total: 44.48 km^{2} (17.17 sq mi)
- Elevation: 547 m (1,795 ft)

Population (1 January 2025)
  - Total: 3,636
  - Density: 81.74/km^{2} (211.7/sq mi)
- Demonym: Gianesi
- Time zone: UTC+1 (CET)
  - Summer (DST): UTC+2 (CEST)
- Postal code: 06030
- Dialing code: 0742
- Website: Official website

Giano dell'Umbria is a comune (municipality) in the Province of Perugia in the Italian region Umbria, located about 35 km southeast of Perugia. It is one of I Borghi più belli d'Italia ("The most beautiful villages of Italy").

== Etymology ==
The name of Giano is traditionally derived from a nearby temple dedicated to the god Janus.

== History ==
Before the mid-13th century the area was held by local noble lords, who also possessed nearby castles. In 1247 it was included, together with Castagnola, Montecchio and Macciano, in the territory granted by the Church to Spoleto.

Control remained contested in the later 13th century. Disputes arose in 1274 between ducal authority and the city of Spoleto, followed by renewed submission of the local inhabitants and the reassertion of Spoleto's control in 1279. Further conflicts in 1281 again ended with submission to Spoleto.

The settlement does not appear in the district records of Spoleto in 1361, but was reinstated under its jurisdiction by papal decree on 24 June 1440. This arrangement proved unstable: it was removed from Spoleto's control in 1474 by papal legate Della Rovere, then restored to its jurisdiction in 1478.

In the early 16th century the community, together with nearby settlements, voluntarily submitted to Spoleto. Severio Minervio of Spoleto was granted the lordship of Giano by Pope Leo X in the early 16th century, but the inhabitants refused to accept his authority and instead secured their freedom by paying a substantial sum. In 1527 the castle was left undefended against League forces. It was granted in 1529 to Lorenzo Cybo, but by 1530 had returned to Spoleto's control; Cybo's claims were later renounced, and full rights were transferred to the city after negotiations.

From 1530 until 1816 the territory remained continuously under Spoleto. In 1803, Giano was a feudal domain of the Magistrate of Spoleto. By 1816, it belonged to the Community of Spoleto.

In 1816 it was recognized as an autonomous administration, and in 1817 established as a municipality under the governor of Montefalco, including Montecchio, Morcicchia, Castagnola and Muriano. The same administrative structure was confirmed in 1827, and by 1833 additional dependent localities included Collemezzo, Fabbri, Macciano, Rustichino, Sagiano, San Savino and Santo Stefano.

By 1858 the municipality formed part of the province of Spoleto and was governed from Montefalco; its dependencies had been reduced to Castagnola and Montecchio. In the mid-19th century Giano had a population of 968 inhabitants. Of these, 145 lived in the town and 823 in the surrounding countryside.

Following the unification of Italy it was included in the region of Umbria. Castagnola and Montecchio remained dependent in 1861. In 1863 the municipality adopted the name Giano dell'Umbria.

== Geography ==
Giano is situated on a hill at the foot of the Monti Martani, with a wide and open outlook extending toward the north. The surrounding territory includes wooded areas with oak and beech. The climate is described as fairly temperate, with prevailing winds from the south and north.

Giano dell'Umbria is situated at an elevation of 547 metres (1,795 ft) above sea level. It lies about 21 kilometres (13 mi) from Spoleto and 10 kilometres (6.2 mi) from Montefalco. The territory is largely hilly.

The municipality borders the following municipalities: Castel Ritaldi, Gualdo Cattaneo, Massa Martana, Montefalco and Spoleto.

=== Subdivisions ===
The municipality includes the localities of Bastardo, Bivio Moscardini, Camporeggiano, Casa Maggi, Casa Naticchia, Castagnola, Convento San Felice, Fabbri, Formicaio, Giano, Macciano, Montecchio, Morcicchia, Moriano, Rustichino, San Sabino, Sant'Andrea, Santo Stefano, Seggiano.

In 2021, 755 people lived in rural dispersed dwellings not assigned to any named locality.

At the time, most of the population lived in Bastardo (2,100).

== Religion and culture ==
=== San Francesco ===
The Church of San Francesco dates to the second half of the 13th century. The exterior, built in pink stone blocks with a dual-pitched roof, has a façade raised above the original and decorated with a blocked oculus and a recessed portal. The interior consists of a single nave and preserves a wooden organ from the 18th century on the counter-façade.

The walls feature six wooden altars from the 18th century (three on each side), adorned with scagliola panels of Tuscan school painted with floral motifs and surmounted by notable canvases. The grand main altar is a large Baroque wooden structure, which conceals the original apse decorated with valuable frescoes from the 14th century. In the chapel of the Crucifix, a cycle of frescoes attributed to Giovanni di Corraduccio, dating to the 14th century, is preserved.

=== Abbey of San Felice ===
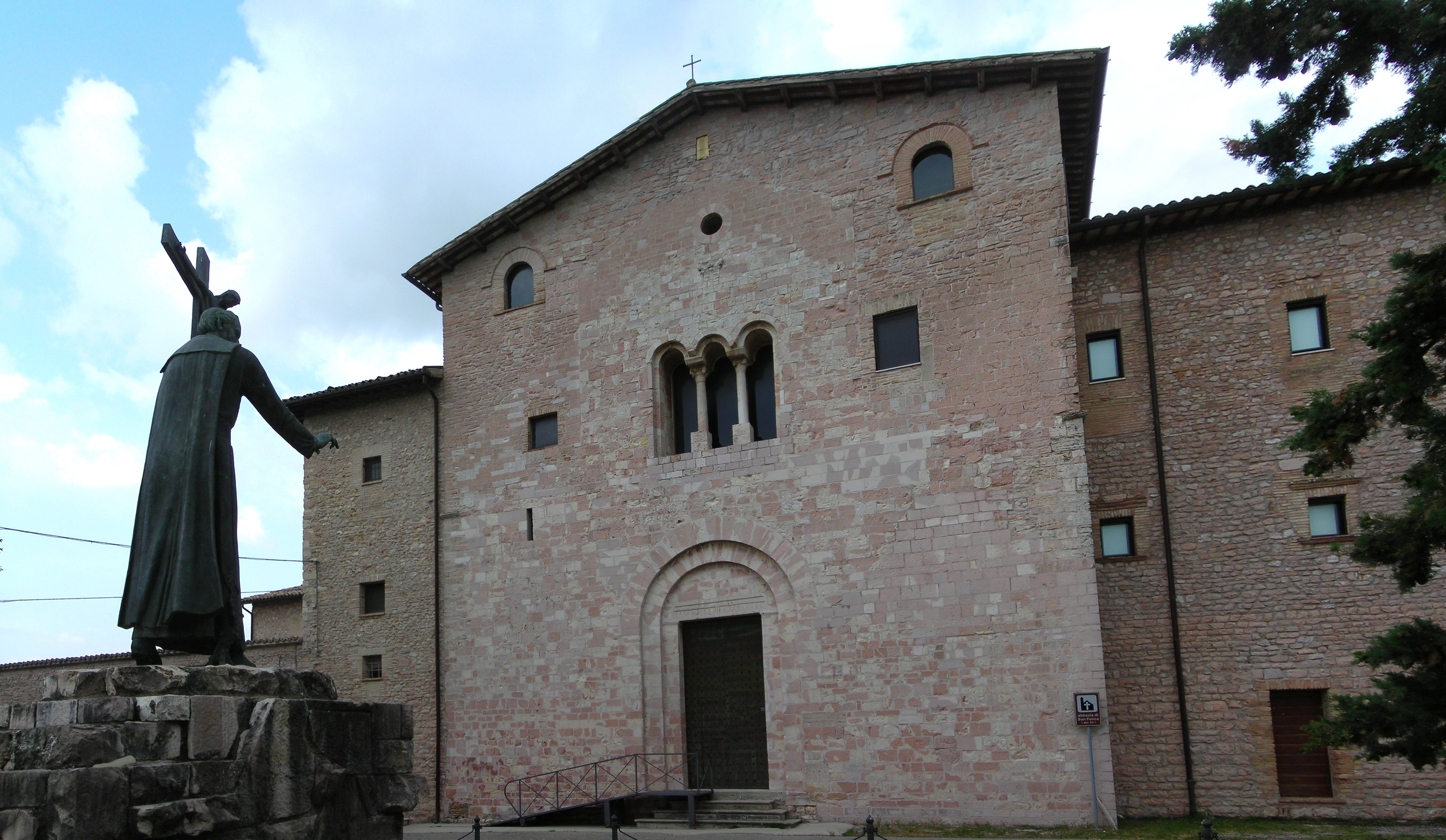
Abbey of San Felice

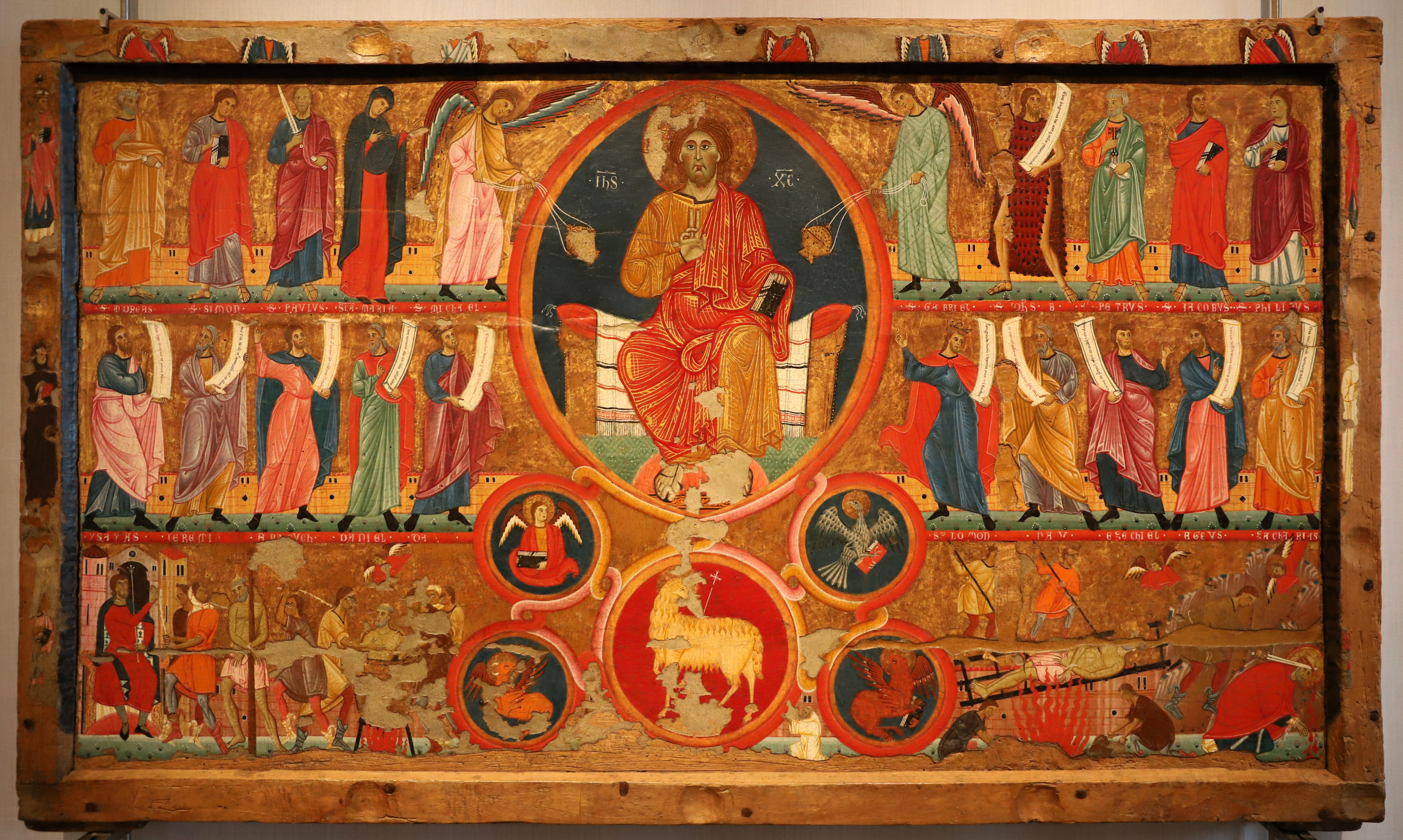
Painted dossal from the abbey of San Felice, c. 1250; now in Galleria Nazionale dell'Umbria.

The abbey of San Felice occupies an isolated position overlooking the surrounding area. The first monastic settlement is dated around 950, but the current church and monastery were built at the beginning of the 12th century, apparently atop a 4th-century oratory that housed the tomb of the martyred bishop Felice.

Between 1373 and 1450, the abbey came under the jurisdiction of Sassovivo Abbey and later was granted to the Augustinian hermits of Perugia. Restoration work began in 1452 and concluded in 1481, with further modifications in the 16th and 18th centuries, including the construction of the cloister and convent buildings on the church’s right side. A major 20th-century restoration in 1957 returned the interiors to their original design, removing the heavy 18th-century decoration.

The church has three narrow, high naves without a transept and a triconch apse. The raised presbytery is accessed by a staircase. The central nave has a lowered barrel vault, while the lateral naves have cross vaulting. Two rows of circular Lombard-style pillars separate the naves. A triumphal arch divides the nave from the presbytery, featuring a central bifora.

The façade is currently a gabled form, modified in the 16th century from the original four-pitched roof. It includes an elegant trifora with small columns and spolia capitals and a portal with simple recesses. The three external apses are decorated with thin lesenes resting on a high plinth, topped by small arches. The crypt consists of three apsidal naves covered with cross vaults, with the central nave further divided by six columns with capitals decorated with stylized animals and vegetal motifs from the late 11th century. The sarcophagus of Saint Felice is placed behind the altar.

The rectangular cloister has a portico supported by solid square brick pillars, each topped with frescoes of saints and blessed figures. Frescoes on the walls depict scenes from the life of Saint Felice, and a cistern at the center collects rainwater. Since 1815, the abbey has housed the Congregation of the Most Precious Blood, founded by Gaspare del Bufalo.

=== Other religious heritage ===
The parish church of Giano is dedicated to San Michele Arcangelo. The town's patron saint is San Felice, bishop and martyr, whose feast is celebrated on 30 October.

Other religious buildings include the church of the Madonna delle Grazie, of octagonal form, and San Francesco, a Latin cross church with an attached convent, containing an organ and decorated altars.

=== Palazzo Pubblico ===
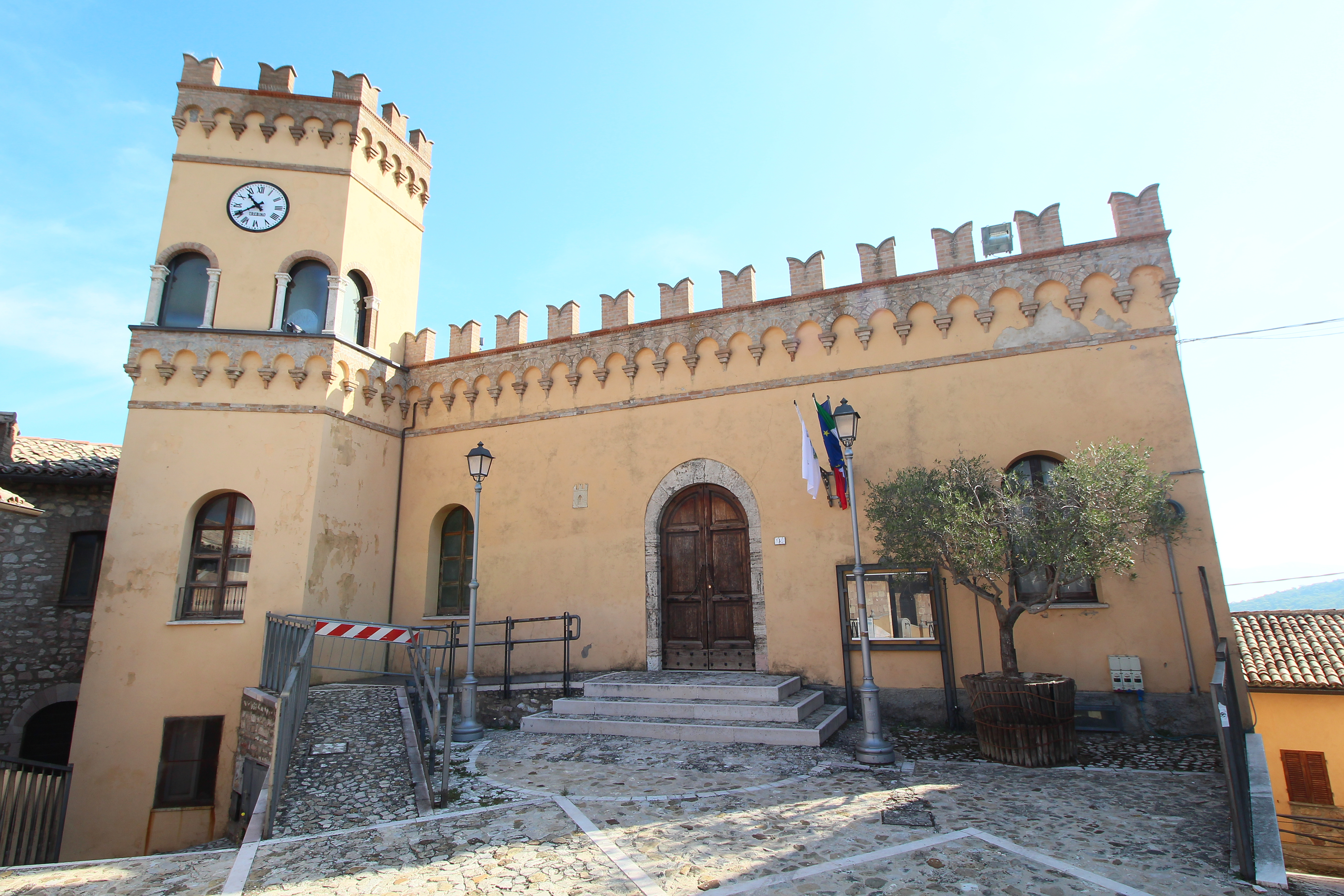
Palazzo Pubblico

The Palazzo Pubblico, of medieval origin, has undergone multiple renovations over the centuries. To the left of the entrance is a bricked-in municipal coat of arms dating to the 14th–15th centuries. In the council chamber, a decorative frieze painted in 1934 depicts all the castles within the municipality. The building also houses archaeological finds from an ancient Roman villa discovered in the locality of Toccioli.

=== Other heritage sites ===
The town is noted for the presence of two castles of ancient and distinctive construction.

== Notable people ==
Giano is the birthplace of the engineer Antonio Rutili Gentili, author of various works and member of the revision of the Censo morto, and of the physician Gioacchino Pompili, noted as a practitioner of homeopathy.

Among the principal families recorded in the 19th century are the Pompili, Masci and Santi.

== See also ==
- Jordanus of Giano
