= Viepri =

- Frazione
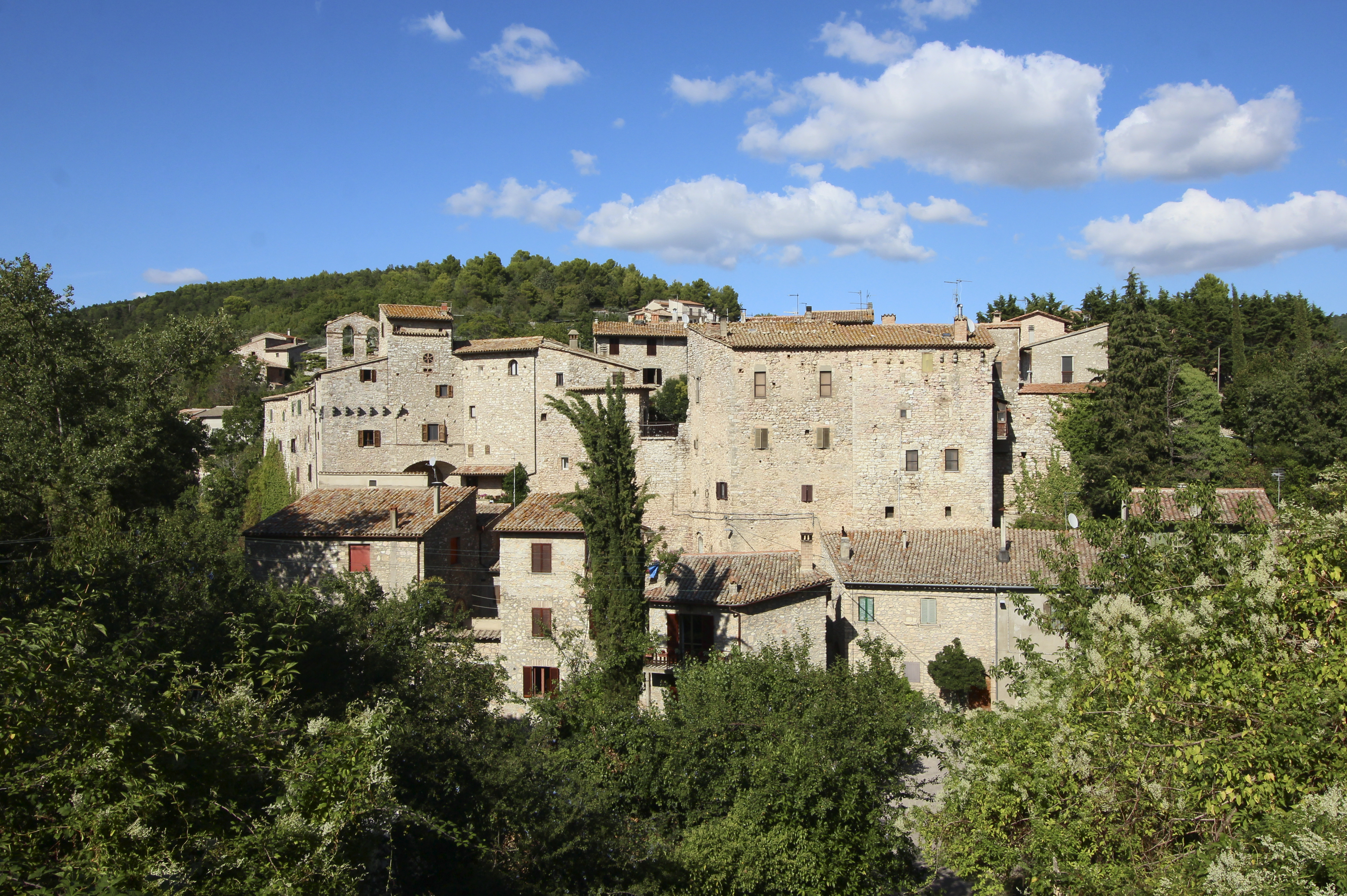
- View of Viepri

- Location of Viepri in Italy
- Coordinates: 42°49′30″N 12°31′0″E
- Country: Italy
- Region: Umbria
- Province: Perugia
- Comune: Massa Martana
- Elevation: 480 m (1,570 ft)

Population (2021)
  - Total: 147
- Time zone: UTC+1 (CET)
  - Summer (DST): UTC+2 (CEST)
- Dialing code: 075

Viepri is an Italian village in the Colli Martani of central Umbria, a frazione of Massa Martana, 7 km north of that town and another 7 km south-southwest of Bastardo.

According to the 2021 census, Viepri has a population of 147 inhabitants and stands at an elevation of 478 metres (1,568 ft) above sea level. (Note: To obtain the data from the website: 1. Select "Basi Territoriali 2021: Confini amministrativi, Località, Sezioni di censimento, Aree SubCom".; 2. Use the search function to find the desired place.; 3. Click the Attribute Table icon in the top-right corner.; 4. In the panel that appears at the bottom of the page, select "Località 2021".)

== History ==
Viepri developed after 1380, following the destruction of the nearby castle of Monte Schignano. Its strategic position led to disputes between the communes of Todi and Foligno. In 1392 the settlement submitted to Ugolino III Trinci, lord of Foligno, but it later came under the control of Todi. The emblem of Todi, carved on one of the village gates, reflects this period of domination. Portions of the medieval walls and the two entrance gates still survive.

The medieval castle was destroyed in 1480. By the mid-19th century, the site of the old castle had largely fallen into ruin, with only sections of high walls remaining.

In the mid-19th century, the area was considered poor. Its principal resource was the abundant production of acorns.

== Geography ==
Viepri is situated not far from the ancient Via Flaminia, the road leading toward Foligno. The surrounding territory historically covered 11,799 tavole. About half a mile from the village stand the remains of a small fortress known as Rocchette, built in 1304 by the nobles of Castelvecchio and largely destroyed in 1404; its vestiges are still visible.

== Demographics ==
In 1859, 325 people lived within the parish of Viepri, organized into 62 families occupying 60 houses. Of these, only 65 residents lived in the village itself, while the remaining 260 were dispersed throughout the countryside.

== Architecture ==
The historic centre preserves elements of its medieval fortifications, including two entrance gates and sections of the defensive walls. Nearby, on a hill overlooking the area, stands the Castello delle Rocchette. Documented as early as 1295, it was restored in 1339 by members of the noble family of Castelvecchio and is later referred to in 15th-century records as Rocca d'Angiolo di Mattiolo. The castle complex is privately owned.

Viepri is noted for its well-preserved medieval character, marked by the extensive use of stone in its construction. It is chiefly known for the Romanesque abbey of Santa Maria in Viepri. Another medieval church, remains of the defensive walls, and two gates also survive.

== Religion ==
The Church of San Giovanni preserves a fresco dated 1577 depicting the Madonna and Child with angels above, the Beheading of Saint John the Baptist below, and Saint Roch to one side.

Within the Castello delle Rocchette, the Church of Santa Maria della Concezione contains a cycle of 16th-century frescoes, including a representation of the Madonna del Soccorso.

Monuments of Viepri

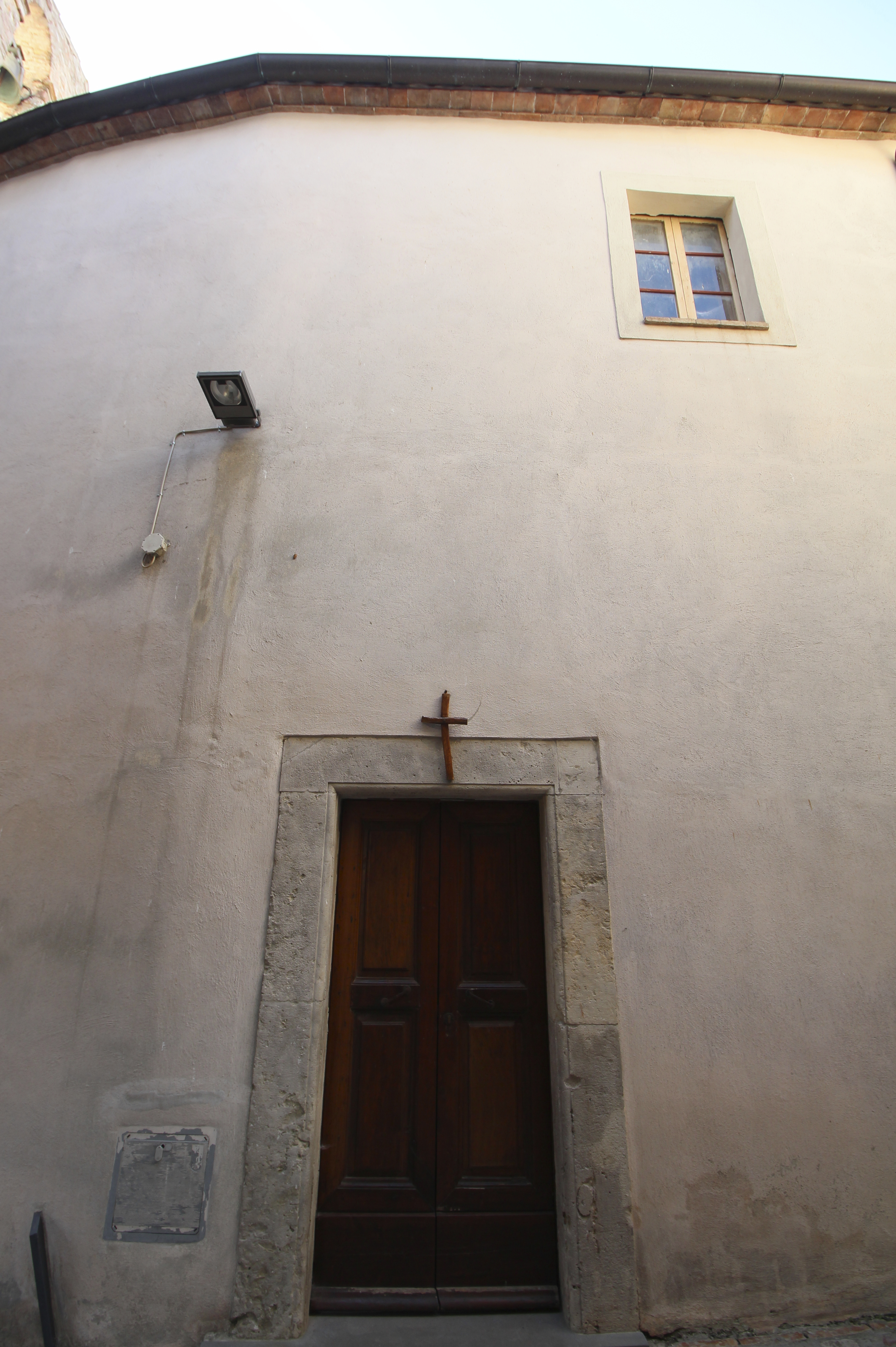
The church of San Giovanni Battista

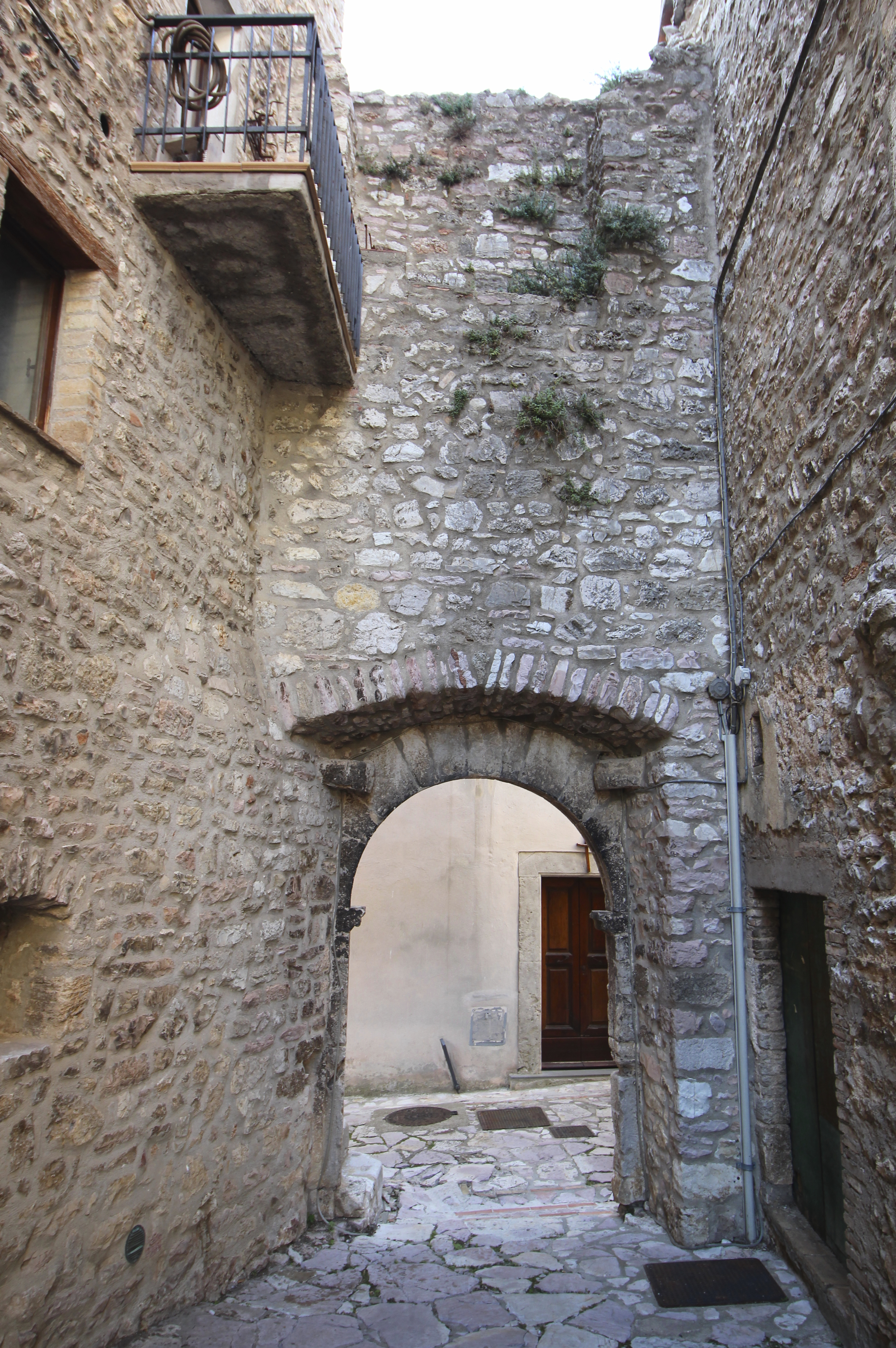
Gate of the defensive walls

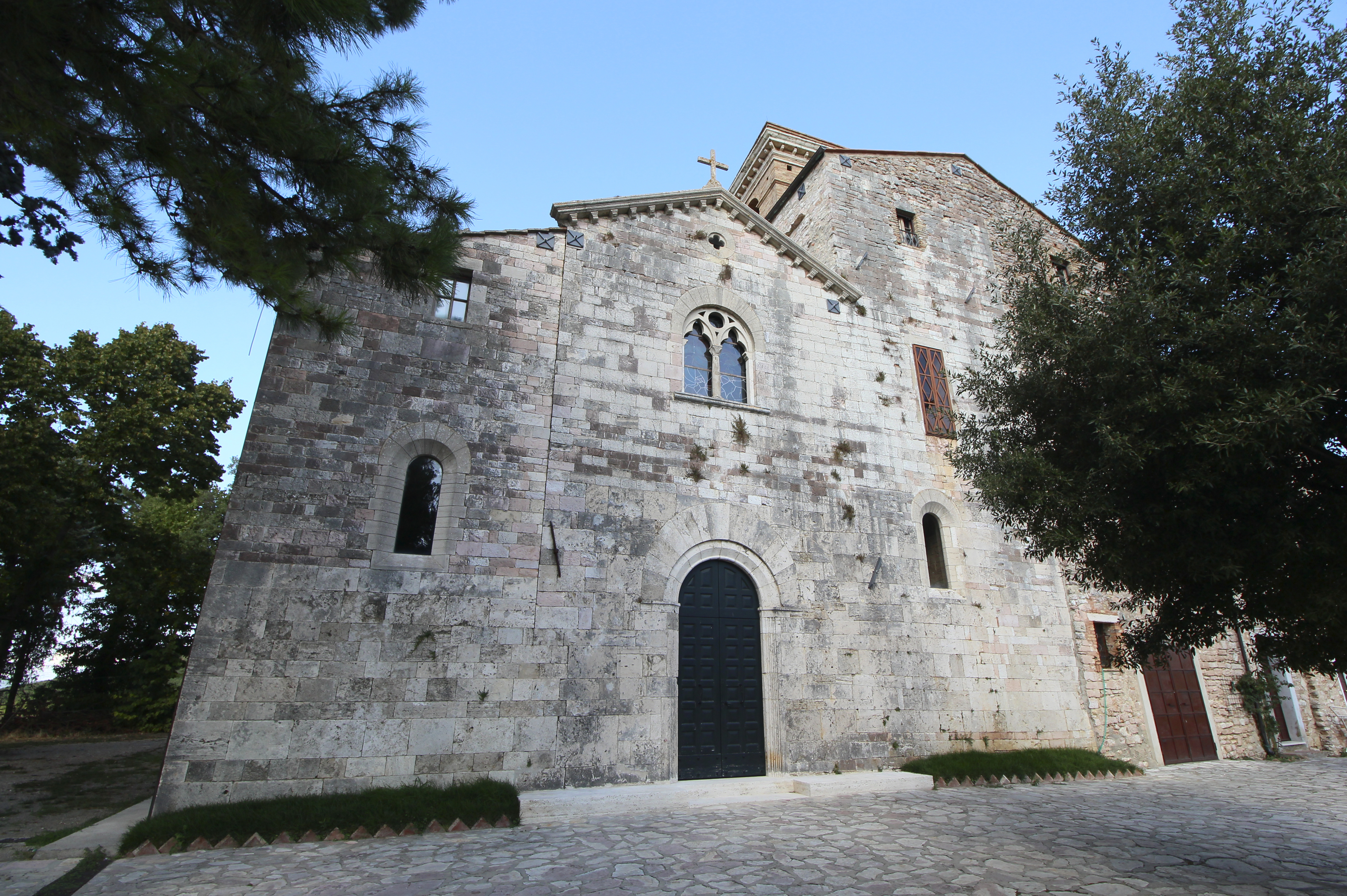
The Abbey of Santa Maria Vepri
