= Santa Illuminata, Massa Martana =

Church and abbey in Massa Martana, Italy

Santa Illuminata
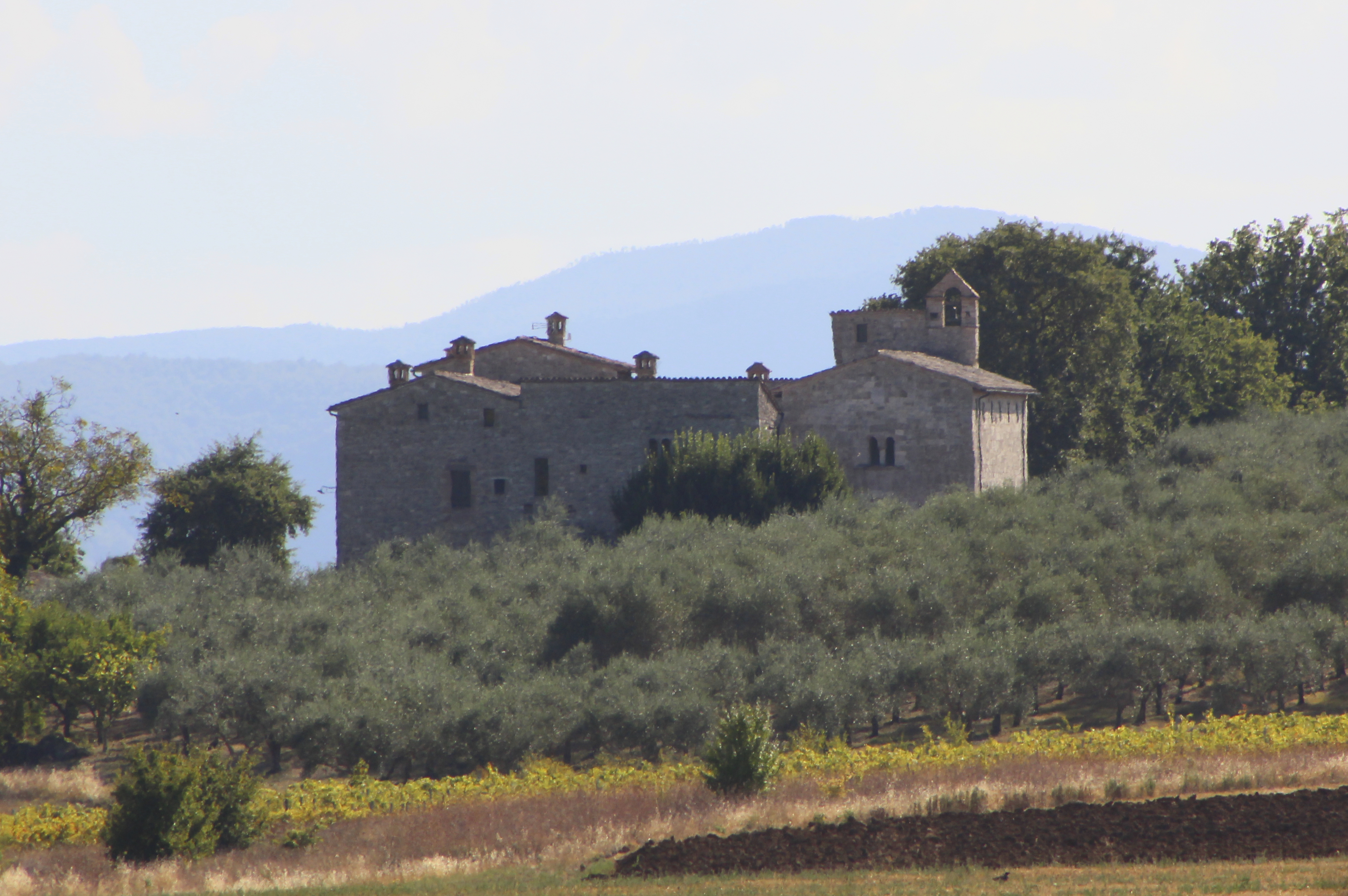
- Abbey Santa Illuminata

- Location within Italy Location within Umbria

Religion
- Affiliation: Catholic Church

Location
- Location: Massa Martana, province of Perugia, Umbria, Italy.
- Interactive map of Santa Illuminata
- Coordinates: 42°46′58″N 12°29′42″E

Architecture
- Type: Monastery, church
- Style: Romanesque

The abbey of Santa Illuminata is a Romanesque, former Camaldolese monastery and church outside of the town of Massa Martana, province of Perugia, Umbria, Italy.

== History ==
Tradition holds the church was erected over the burial site of the Saint, who had fled from Ravenna. The church and monastery is documented by 1128 as having been founded in the prior century by Camaldolese monks from Sant'Apollinare in Classe in Ravenna. According to a charter of 1138 by archbishop Gualtiero of Ravenna, Santa Illuminata was included in the goods belonging to the abbey of Sant'Apollinare in Classe. The monastery was suppressed in 1260, when it became dependent on the Todi Cathedral. That year the prior was Benedetto Caetani, who would become Pope Boniface VIII.

== Architecture ==
The façade has three arches, two of them walled up. Above the center rounded arch is a mullioned window. The apse has a sail-like belltower. The interior has traces of frescoes, but houses an 18th-century canvas depicting Life of Santa Illuminata by Giovanni Andrea Lazzarini. The adjacent courtyard has Romanesque windows.
