= Santa Maria in Viepri =

Catholic church in Perugia province, Italy

Coordinates: 42°49′30.6″N 12°31′00.9″E

The abbey of Santa Maria di Viepri is a Romanesque, former Benedictine monastery and church in Viepri, a hamlet of the town of Massa Martana, province of Perugia, Umbria, Italy.

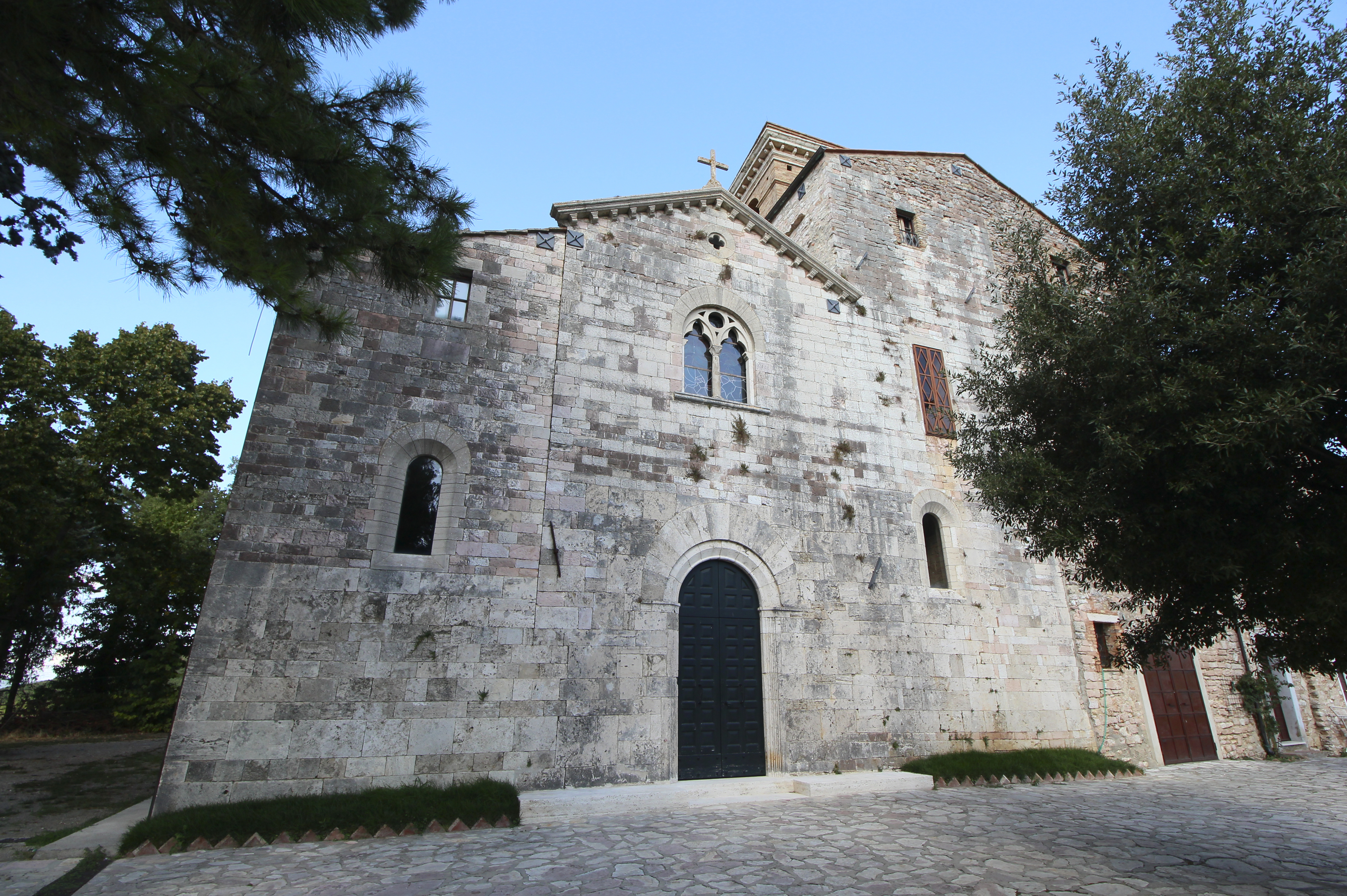
Santa Maria in Viepri, facade

== History ==
The church was erected circa 1150 by the lords of Castelvecchio. It was once associated with an adjacent castle and monastery. Construction might have been aided by nearby stones from the Via Flaminia. The stone façade is made of stone bricks with a small mullioned window. A large bell-tower arises next to the façade. The semicircular apses differ, with the center one being less decorated. The church contains some of the Romanesque sculptural elements embedded in the walls. The interior still has three naves, but the pilasters lack capitals. The church houses a Birth of the Virgin and a Madonna of the Rosary painted by Andrea Polinori.

In October 2021, the Polinori paintings were restored, with funding from the Worsnip family, the Pro Loco of Viepri and the Comunanza Agraria.
