= San Felice, Massa Martana =

Church in Massa Martana, Italy

Coordinates: 42°46′36″N 12°31′24″E

San Felice is a Roman Catholic church in the town of Massa Martana, province of Perugia, Umbria, Italy.

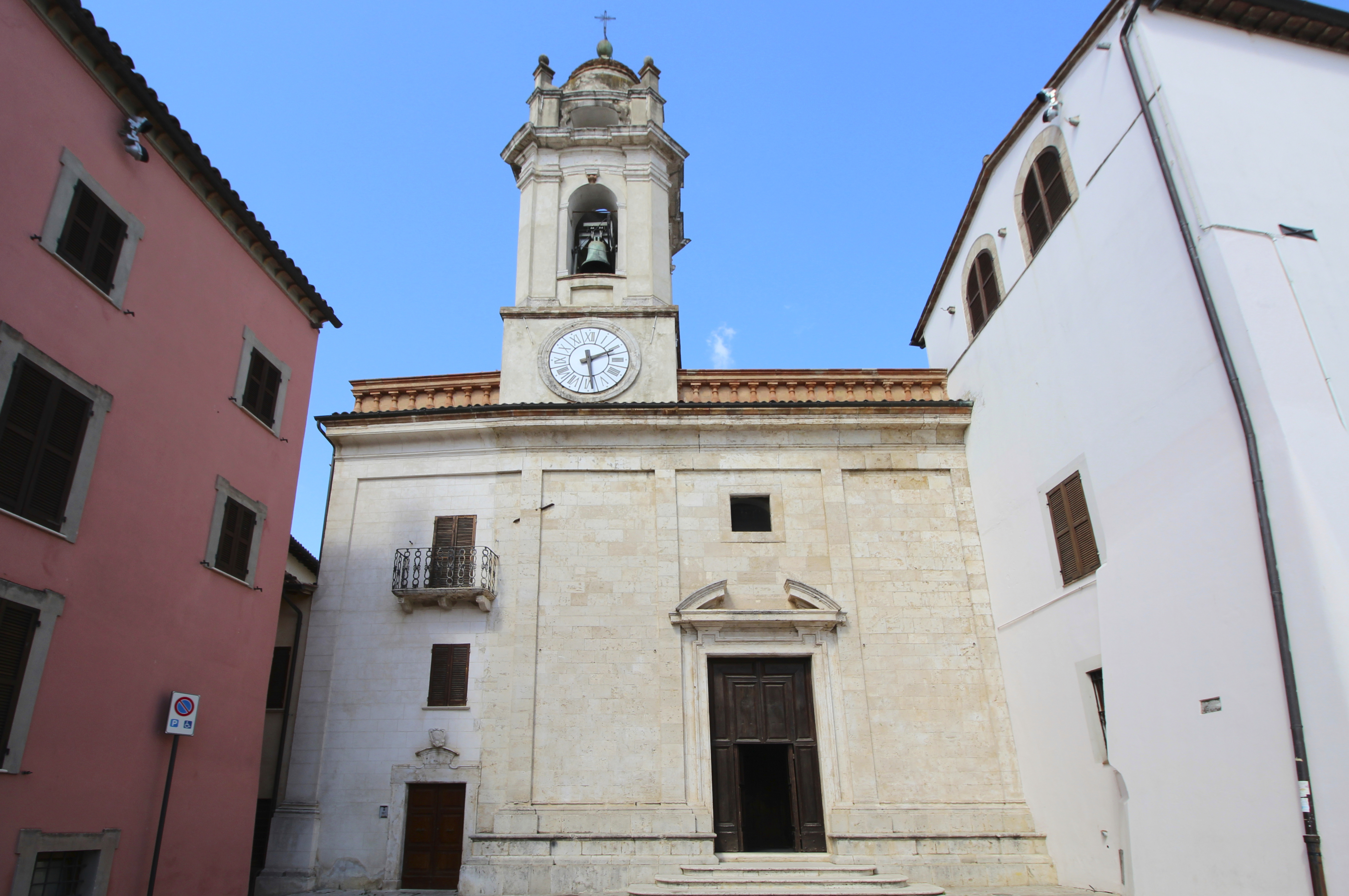
The church San Felice, Facade

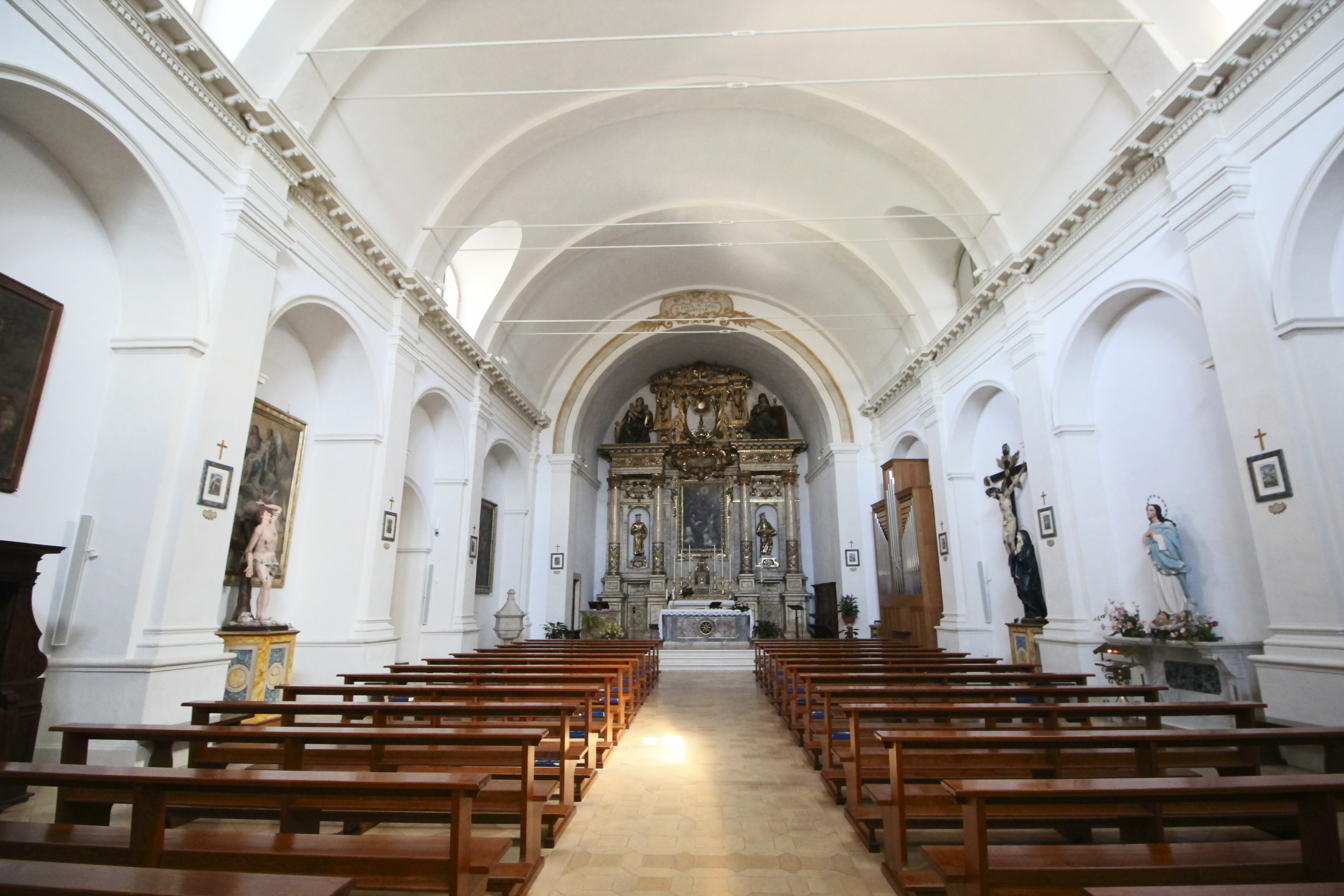
The church San Felice, Interior

== History ==
The church is dedicated to the town patron saint, Felice, said to have been the bishop and later martyr during the persecutions by Emperors Diocletian and Maximinian.

While the church was initially erected by medieval times, the present structure has undergone many re-edifications. The church was damaged during the second world war. The façade with stone blocks has tall pilasters and a baroque belltower rising from the cornice. The interior has a single nave surrounded by large pilasters. The main altarpiece depicts the Madonna with Blessed Ruggero, St Felix, Santa Rita and St Pope Pius V (1723) by Giacinto Boccanera. On the wall to the left of the entrance are two 16th-century frescoes depicting a Crucifixion and an Enthroned Virgin and Child with Saints Roch and Ambrosius. There are also 15th-century frescoes including a Virgin and Child with St Sebastian and St Bernardino da Siena.
