= Vicus Martis Tudertium =

Archaeological site in Umbria, central Italy

- Location within Umbria
- 42°45′5″N 12°31′55″E
- Type: Settlement
- Cultures: Roman
- Location: Perugia (PG)
- Region: Umbria

Site notes
- Archaeologists: John Muccigrosso
- Condition: ruined
- Public access: yes

The Vicus Martis Tudertium is an archaeological site in Umbria, central Italy. It is located c. 2 kilometres (1.2 mi) south of Massa Martana, a small comune in the province of Perugia.

== Origins and history ==
Most historians associate the site's foundation with the building of the ancient Roman road, the via Flaminia, in 220-219 BC. When the Via Flaminia was built, its western branch proceeded north from Narni (ancient Narnia), through the Vicus, to Bevagna (ancient Mevania). This branch of the road courses through a gently rolling upland plain at the foot of the Martani mountain range, an area that had been heavily populated since the middle of the Bronze Age. The eastern branch proceeded from Narni to Terni, north to Spoleto, then past Trevi and finally to Foligno, where it merged with the western branch.

The site is mentioned by name in several inscriptions, including three now found in the church of S. Maria in Pantano and its bell tower. A fourth was discovered during agricultural work in the fields by the church of S. Maria in Pantano and is now located in the small museum in the cloister of S. Maria della Pace in Massa Martana The site also appears in the ancient Roman itineraries found on the Vicarello cups, and (possibly) in the Tabula Peutingeriana. Another ancient inscription, embedded in the gate of Massa Martana, but discovered nearby, mentions work done on a road by the Roman emperor Hadrian. It is generally assumed that this refers to the Via Flaminia.

Unlike other of the towns and cities on the two branches of the old Roman road, virtually nothing of the vicus lasted to the modern period. Apart from the already noted inscriptions, the only evidence of Roman presence on the site was the building of the church of S. Maria in Pantano, which appears to have been built into the ruins of a Roman-period structure. Other nearby ruins include the viaducts at S. Giovanni de Butris, Ponte Fonnaia and Bastardo, and significant substructures near the train station at Massa Martana Scalo.

Excavation now suggests that the site was abandoned in antiquity and subsequently despoiled, with stone material being used at nearby sites, such as the medieval church of San Faustino, in the nearby Villa San Faustino frazione of Massa Martana.

== Excavation ==
Excavation at the site has been carried out since 2008 by Dr. John D. Muccigrosso of Drew University. The work is currently being carried out as a field school.
