= Santa Maria in Pantano, Massa Martana =

Church in Pantano, Massa Martana, Italy

Santa Maria in Pantano is a Romanesque-style, Roman Catholic church and former monastery outside of the town of Massa Martana, province of Perugia, Umbria, Italy.

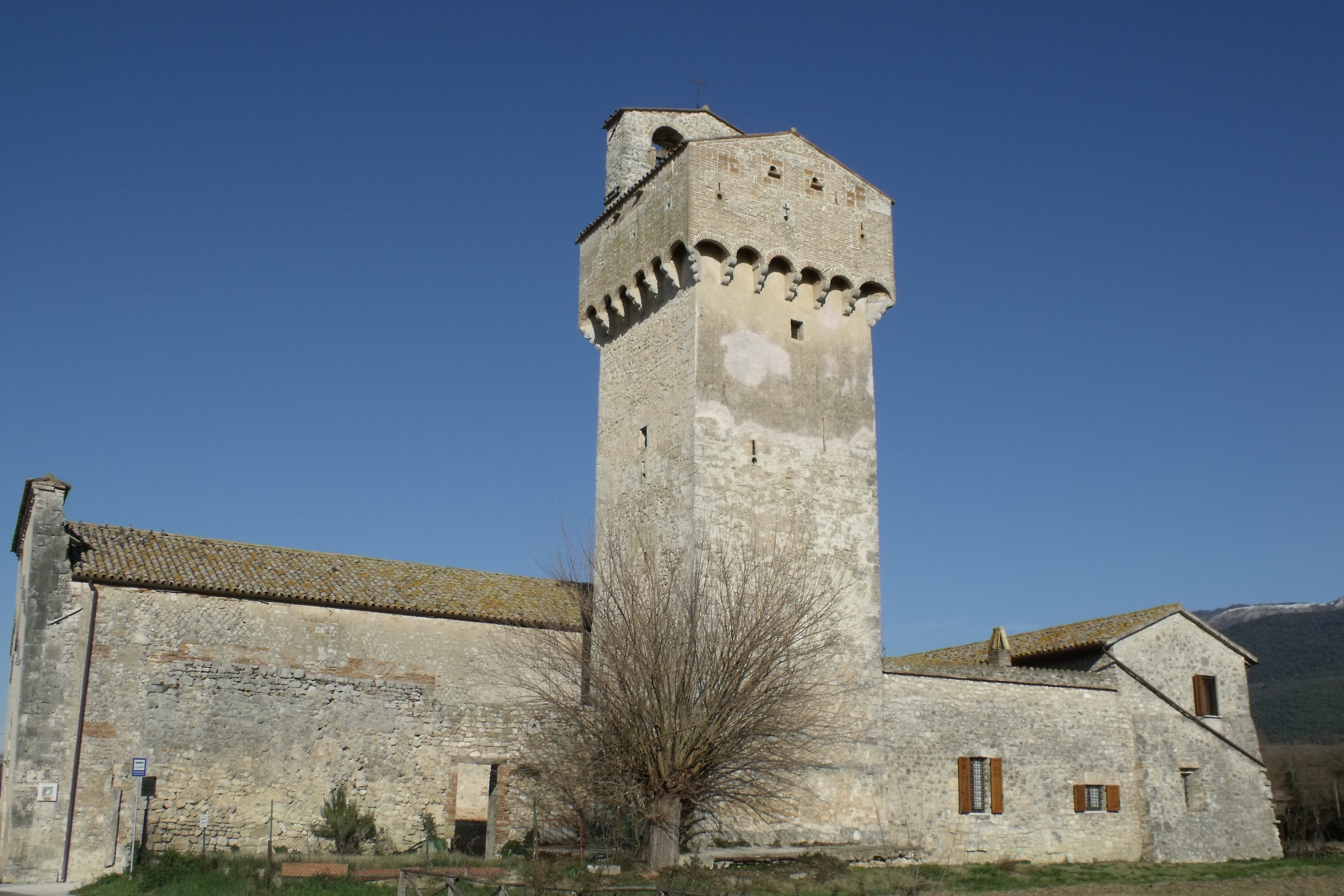
The church of Santa Maria in Pantano

== History ==
Tradition holds a church at the site was first erected in the 5th century by the Magister Militum Severo using the remains of a former pagan temple. Some of the elements of the walls on the right appear to derive from a Late Roman Empire building. Likely a church was erected atop a prior Roman structure in the 7th or 8th centuries with a single hall ending in a semicircular apse. In the 10th to 11th centuries it was subdivided into three naves. A Benedictine monastery was established alongside. The area, prone to flooding acquired the suffix of pantano or swamp.

The church is first documented as dependent on the Abbey of Farfa in 1115. The façade was added in the 14th and 15th centuries. It has a square face with a Gothic rose window. To the right of the facade is a square 14th-century tower. To the left of the church on the wall of the monastery is a spolia depicting the Sacrifice of Iphigenia. The complex stood beside the ancient Via Flaminia.

The interior houses a number of tomb memorials as well as Roman spolia. The walls have fresco fragments. The left wall has a 13th-century wooden crucifix. The first column on the right has a frescoed depiction of a saint with a papyrus. The altar of the right nave has a 15th-century depiction of the Madonna and Child with Saints Barbara and Antony Abbot by Niccolò di Vannuccio. The wall has a 14th-century fresco depicting Saints Antony Abbot, Peter, Fortunato, and Honophrius; the apse depicts the Virgin and child with Saints Felix and Benedict. On the left wall is a 17th-century Crucifixion with Saints Severo and Francis.
