= Massa Martana =

- Comune
- Comune di Massa Martana
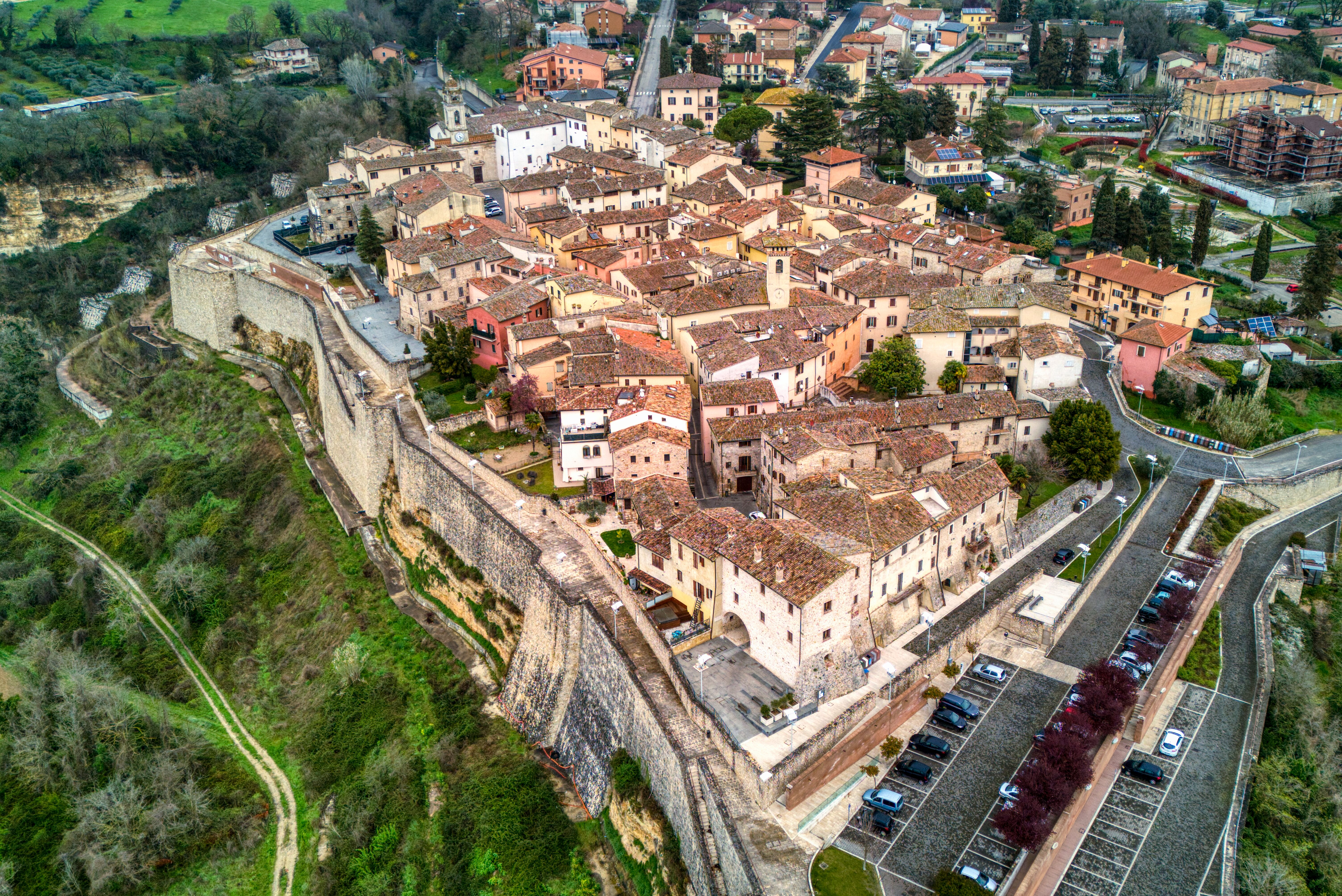
- View of Massa Martana

- Location within Italy Location within Umbria
- Coordinates: 42.775593°N 12.523252°E
- Country: Italy
- Region: Umbria
- Province: Perugia (PG)

Government
  - Mayor: Maria Pia Bruscolotti

Area
  - Total: 78.41 km^{2} (30.27 sq mi)
- Elevation: 351 m (1,152 ft)

Population (1 January 2025)
  - Total: 3,577
  - Density: 45.62/km^{2} (118.2/sq mi)
- Demonym: Massetani
- Time zone: UTC+1 (CET)
  - Summer (DST): UTC+2 (CEST)
- Postal code: 06056
- Dialing code: 075
- Patron saint: Saint Felix
- Saint day: 31 October
- Website: Official website

Massa Martana is a comune (municipality) in the Province of Perugia in the Italian region Umbria, located about 60 kilometres (37 mi) south of Perugia and about 25 kilometres (16 mi) north of Terni.

It is one of the classic walled towns of central Italy. The modern town has spread northwards along the road. It is one of I Borghi più belli d'Italia ("The most beautiful villages of Italy").

== Etymology ==
The name Massa derives from a term frequently found in Lombard-period documents, referring to a group of fortified dwellings and reflecting the settlement's origin.

In 1863 the municipality assumed the name Massa Martana, derived from the ancient Roman settlement of Vicus Martis, a place dedicated to the cult of the god Mars.

== History ==
About 1.5 miles (2.4 km) away, settlements had existed since the time of Augustus along the Via Flaminia. These developed into a center known as Vicus Martis, after a temple to Mars erected by Vespasian, and later took the name Civitas Martana.

The ancient settlement was partially destroyed by an earthquake in 306, and its ruin was completed by the Goths in 546, the Lombards in 590, and finally by the Saracens around 830. From its remains arose several nearby castles, including Colpetrazzo, Montemartano, San Felice di Giano, and Santa Maria in Pantano. The latter site lay in a large plain marked by water channels, believed to be the remains of aqueducts from the ancient city.

The origins of Massa Martana itself date to the Lombard period in the 7th–8th century, when a castle was founded. In the 10th century it was held by the Arnolfi family as part of the Terre Arnolfe, during which time its fortifications were strengthened.

The Bentivenga family were the feudal lords of Massa and enclosed the settlement with walls, which still survive.

In 1305 the settlement was besieged by the Ghibellines of Todi, an event that prompted the intervention of Perugia and Pope Benedict XI. In 1397 Pope Boniface IX removed its control from Todi and placed it under direct papal protection, though in 1403 the same pope restored it to Todi.

During the 15th century the inhabitants revolted against Todi on several occasions, notably in 1432, 1469, and 1473.

In 1565 the Apostolic Camera sold the town to Todi for 23,000 gold scudi; the inhabitants subsequently repurchased it for 11,000. In 1571 it was placed under the protection of the College of Cardinals, and its statutes were reformed.

During the Napoleonic period it was reorganized as a mairie with expanded jurisdiction.

In 1860 Massa Martana was annexed to the Kingdom of Italy, and in 1863 it assumed its current name. In the 19th century Massa had a population of 2,629 inhabitants, of whom 517 lived in the town and 2,112 in the countryside.

The buildings of the walled town suffered major damage in an earthquake on May 12, 1997, a precursor of the 1997 earthquake which damaged much of Umbria, including the Basilica and city of Assisi. The Commune celebrated the completion of restoration works and the reopening of the old town in August 2006, ten years after the earthquake.

== Geography ==
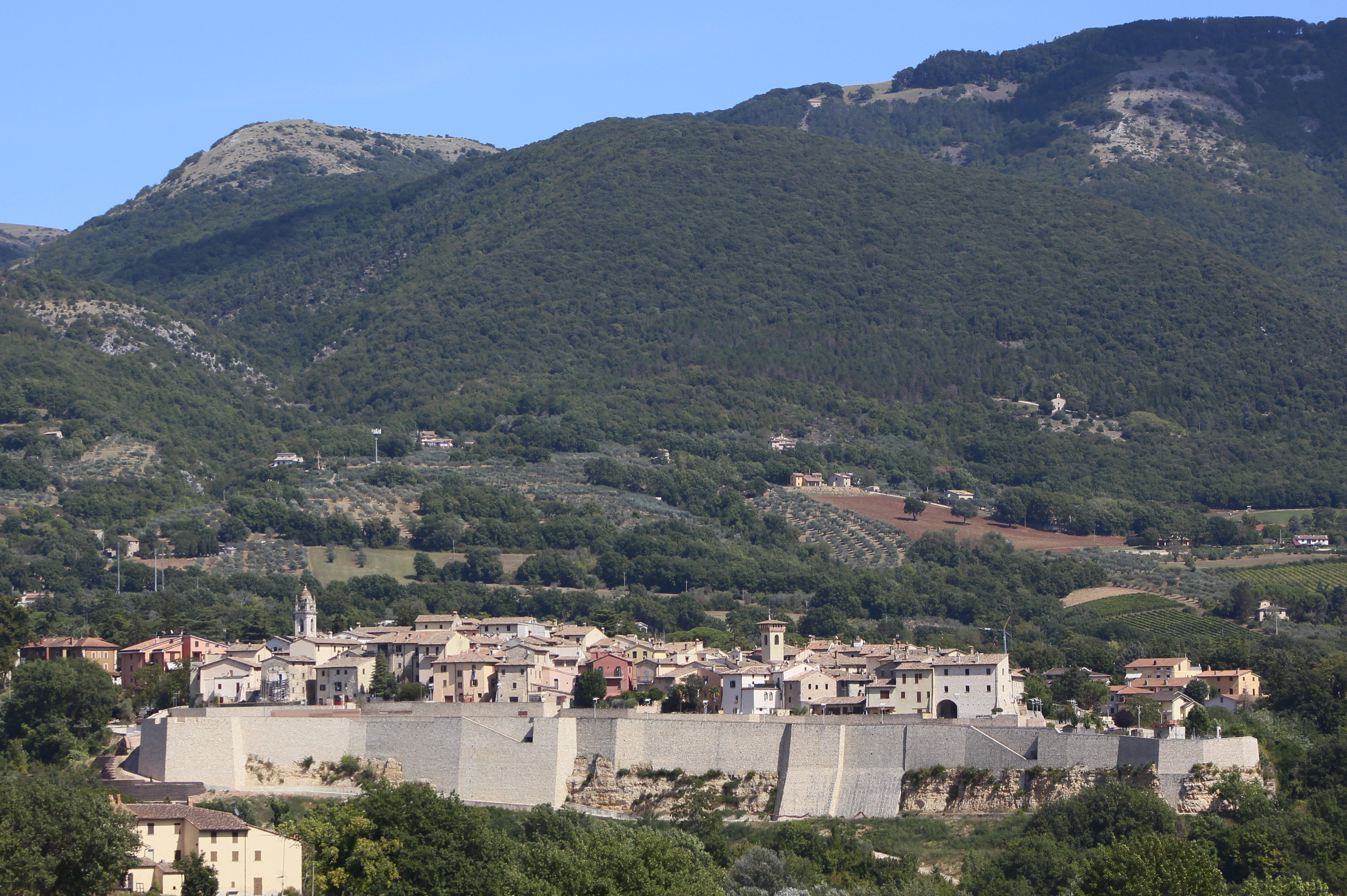
The settlement at the base of the Monti Martani

Massa lies on flat ground a short distance from the Via Flaminia, on tuff, and is approached by an ascent from across a stream. The surrounding area is influenced by winds from the north and south, which at times blow strongly through the Umbrian Valley. To the east, the Martani and Spoletini mountains delay sunrise, while to the west the hills of Todi similarly limit sunset.

The lands on one side of the stream are predominantly siliceous with iron content, while those on the opposite side are clayey.

The town is located about 10 kilometres (6.2 mi) north of Acquasparta, 18 kilometres (11 mi) north of San Gemini, and 32 kilometres (20 mi) north of Narni, and about 14 kilometres (8.7 mi) south of Bastardo and 27 kilometres (17 mi) south of Bevagna.

=== Subdivisions ===
The municipality includes the localities of Barbasciano, Belvedere, Caciaro, Castel Rinaldi, Ceceraio, Colpetrazzo, Località Cimacolle, Massa Martana, Mezzanelli, Montignano, Piemonte, Pozzi, Raggio, Stazione, Torre Lorenzetta, Viepri, Villa San Faustino.

In 2021, 1,670 people lived in rural dispersed dwellings not assigned to any named locality. At the time, the most populous locality was Massa Martana proper (1,239). The following localities had no recorded permanent residents: Castelvecchio.

Castel Rinaldi was founded in 1161 by Rinaldo, Duke of Calabria, after his expulsion from Todi. Montignano was established in 1208 by a noble family of the same name.

== Economy ==
Agriculture formed the basis of the local economy in the 19th century. The territory produced wheat, oil, wine, lupins, chestnuts, hemp, and other goods sufficient for local needs. Wine, produced in large quantities and of good quality, constituted the principal resource of the area. Mulberry trees were widely cultivated for silkworm breeding.

There was significant trade in livestock, especially pigs. Local industry included two dye-works for woolen cloth.

== Religion ==
=== Santa Maria in Pantano ===
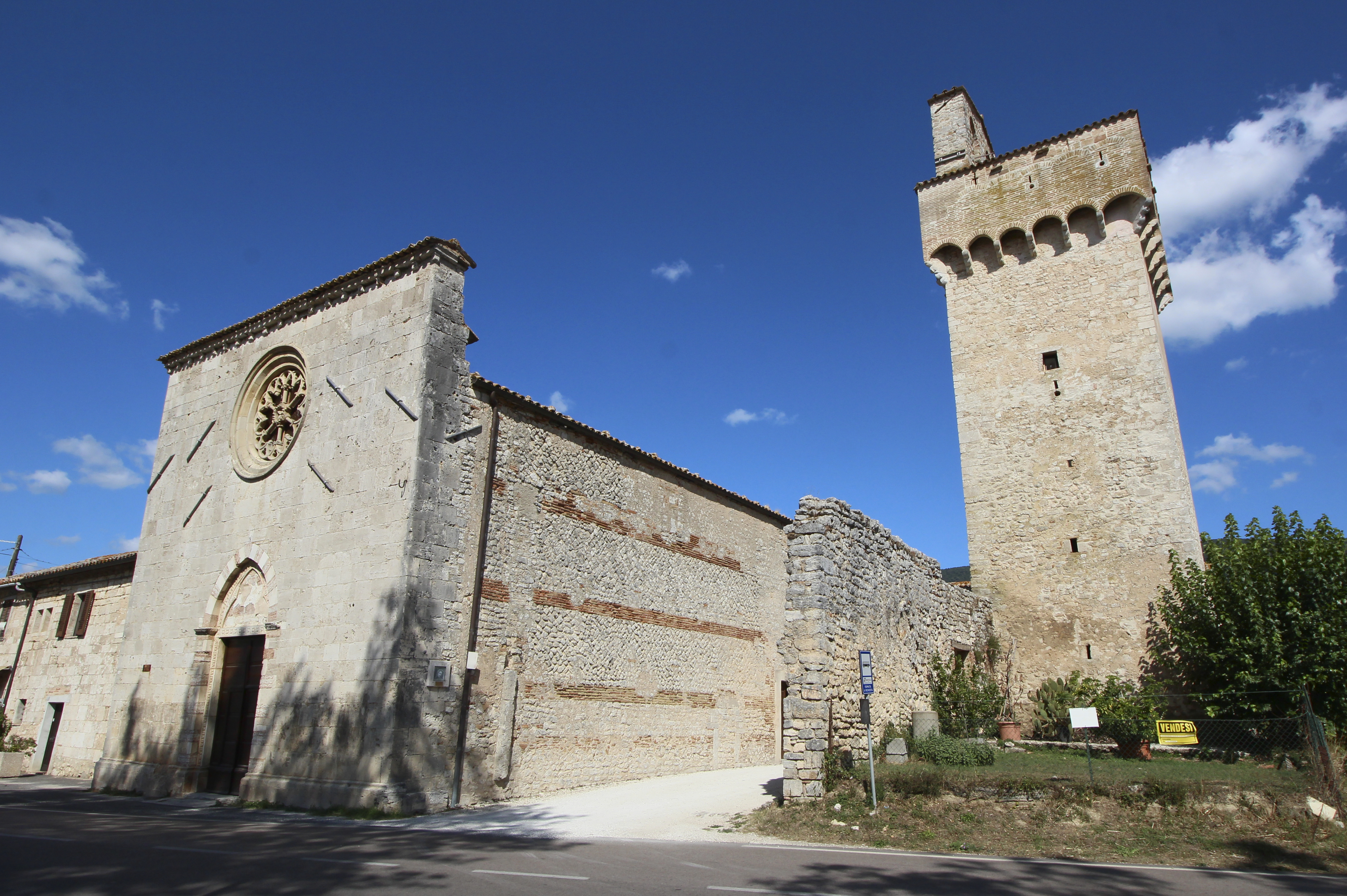
Santa Maria in Pantano

The church of Santa Maria in Pantano stands on Roman foundations within the archaeological area of Vicus Martis. It was originally constructed between the 7th and 8th centuries as a single nave church with an apse, and later divided into three naves between the 10th and 11th centuries.

The church was associated with a Benedictine monastery, whose monks reclaimed and cultivated the surrounding land, often affected by flooding, as reflected in the place name Pantano (swamp, quagmire). Documentary evidence records its donation in 1104 to Farfa Abbey.

The façade, dating to the 14th–15th century, is characterized by a pointed-arch portal with alternating stonework and a rose window. The interior preserves numerous Roman spolia, including funerary urns, inscriptions, and fragments of mosaic and paving. Among the artworks are frescoes from the 14th to the 17th centuries and a wooden crucifix of the 13th century. A square bell tower with medieval decorative elements rises beside the façade.

=== San Felice ===
The church of San Felice is located in the main square of Massa Martana and is dedicated to the town's patron saint. The present building, dating to the 15th–16th century, underwent several reconstructions, including repairs following damage caused by bombing during the World War II.

The façade is composed of squared stone blocks and is surmounted by a bell tower built in 1637. The interior consists of a single nave covered by a barrel vault. The high altar is baroque and incorporates a painting dated 1723 by Giacinto Boccanera. According to tradition, Saint Felice was buried on the site where the church now stands.

=== Abbey of San Faustino ===
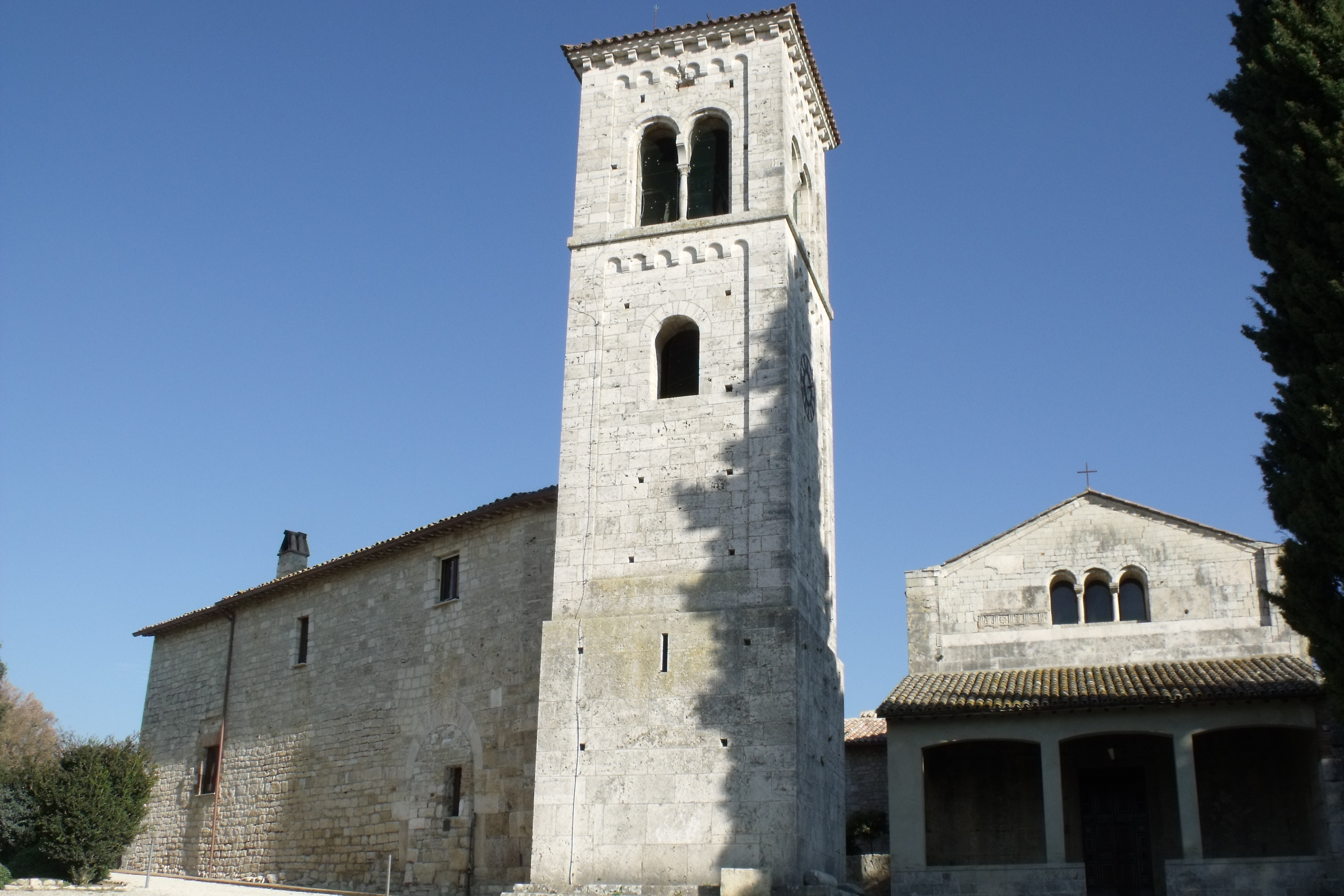
Abbey of San Faustino

The abbey of San Faustino was built on the site of a Roman settlement, as indicated by remains found near the structure. In the Roman period the site was occupied by a summer residence belonging to Julius Marcianus, administrator of the Roman colony of Todi, and his wife Onesta, who were commemorated in an inscription still preserved on the façade.

After the villa fell into ruin, the abbey was established around the 10th–11th century by Benedictine monks, who reused materials from the Roman building. The reuse of Roman materials is evident in decorative elements such as metopes incorporated into the façade and apse.

The church has a simple plan with a single nave and a semicircular apse, with a wooden truss roof. The façade, restored in 1956, is preceded by a portico and features a trifora along with reused Roman decorative fragments. The interior underwent alterations over time, including the loss of the raised presbytery and crypt in the early 18th century. Later 20th-century restorations led to the rediscovery of two sarcophagi, one of which contained relics attributed to Saint Faustino.

=== Abbey of Saints Fidenzio and Terenzio ===
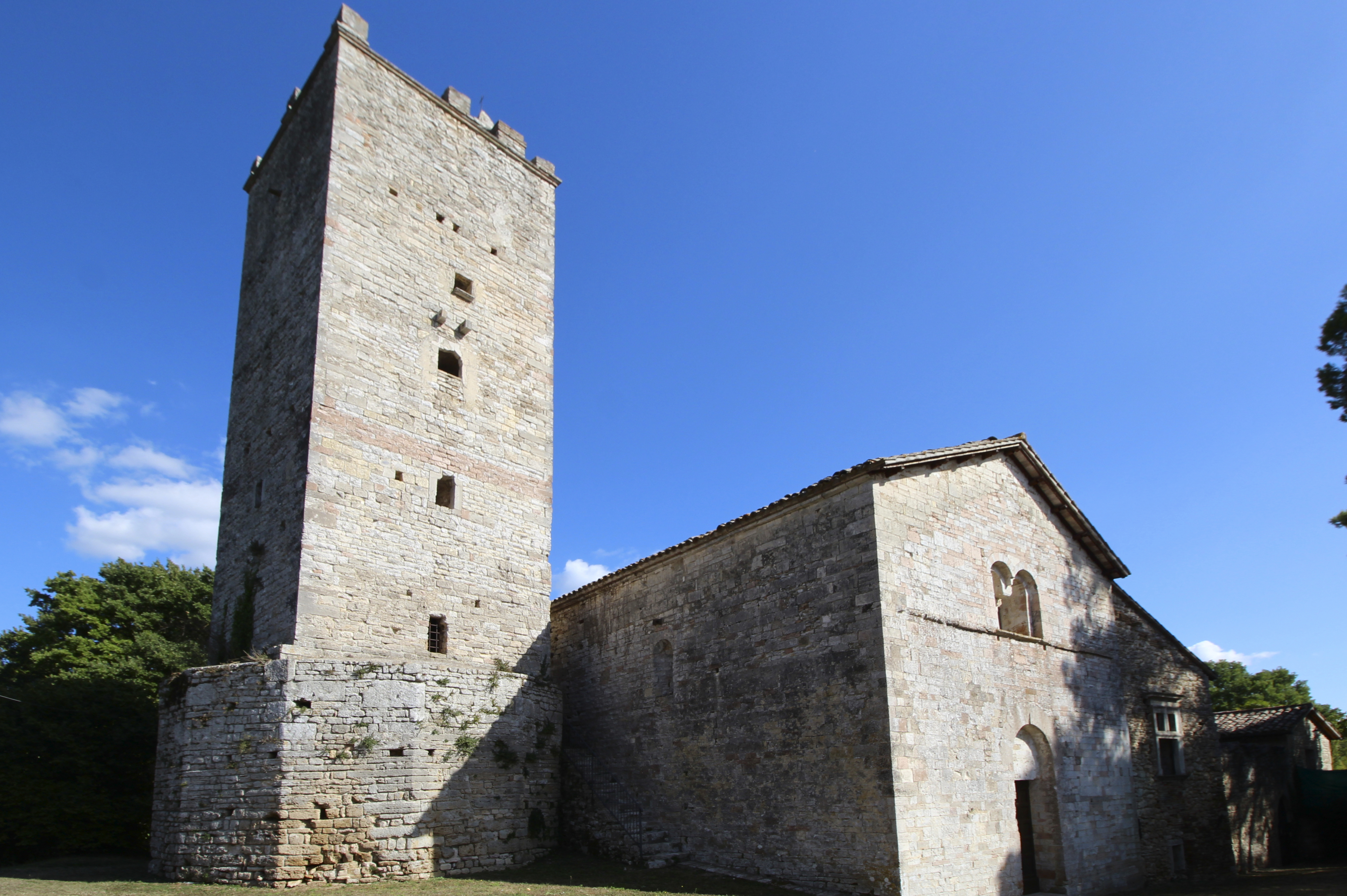
Abbey of Saints Fidenzio and Terenzio

The abbey of Saints Fidenzio and Terenzio dates to the 9th century, when a Benedictine community settled in the adjacent monastery and remained there until the end of the 14th century. It was preceded by a small oratory built over the burial site of the two martyrs, whose remains were exhumed in 1629 and transferred to Bassano di Orte.

The church façade is simple, with a gabled form, a round-arched portal, and a bifora. The interior, rebuilt in the 13th century, consists of a single nave with a raised presbytery and a deep apse incorporating numerous reused early medieval sculptural fragments. The structure includes wooden beams and painted bricks, reinforced by transverse Gothic arches.

The crypt, dating to the late 9th century, is dominated by a central marble column with an Ionic capital supporting the vaults. Along the left side rises a substantial bell tower built over a vaulted space of late imperial date.

=== Other religious heritage ===
Other churches in the area include Santa Illuminata, Santa Maria della Pace, and Santa Maria in Viepri.

== Culture ==
=== Catacomb of Villa San Faustino ===
The catacomb of Villa San Faustino is close to the ancient route of the Via Flaminia and provides evidence of the spread of Christianity in the area from the 4th century.

The underground complex consists of a main corridor about 22 metres (72 ft) long, extending to a depth of approximately 7 metres (23 ft), from which four side galleries branch off. The burial system is based on superimposed loculi, often sealed with tiles, and accompanied by simple grave goods such as terracotta lamps. The absence of inscriptions suggests that the community using the catacomb may have been largely illiterate.

The site was first noted in 1691 and excavated in the early 20th century. It was later used as an air-raid shelter during World War II.

=== Ponte Fonnaia ===
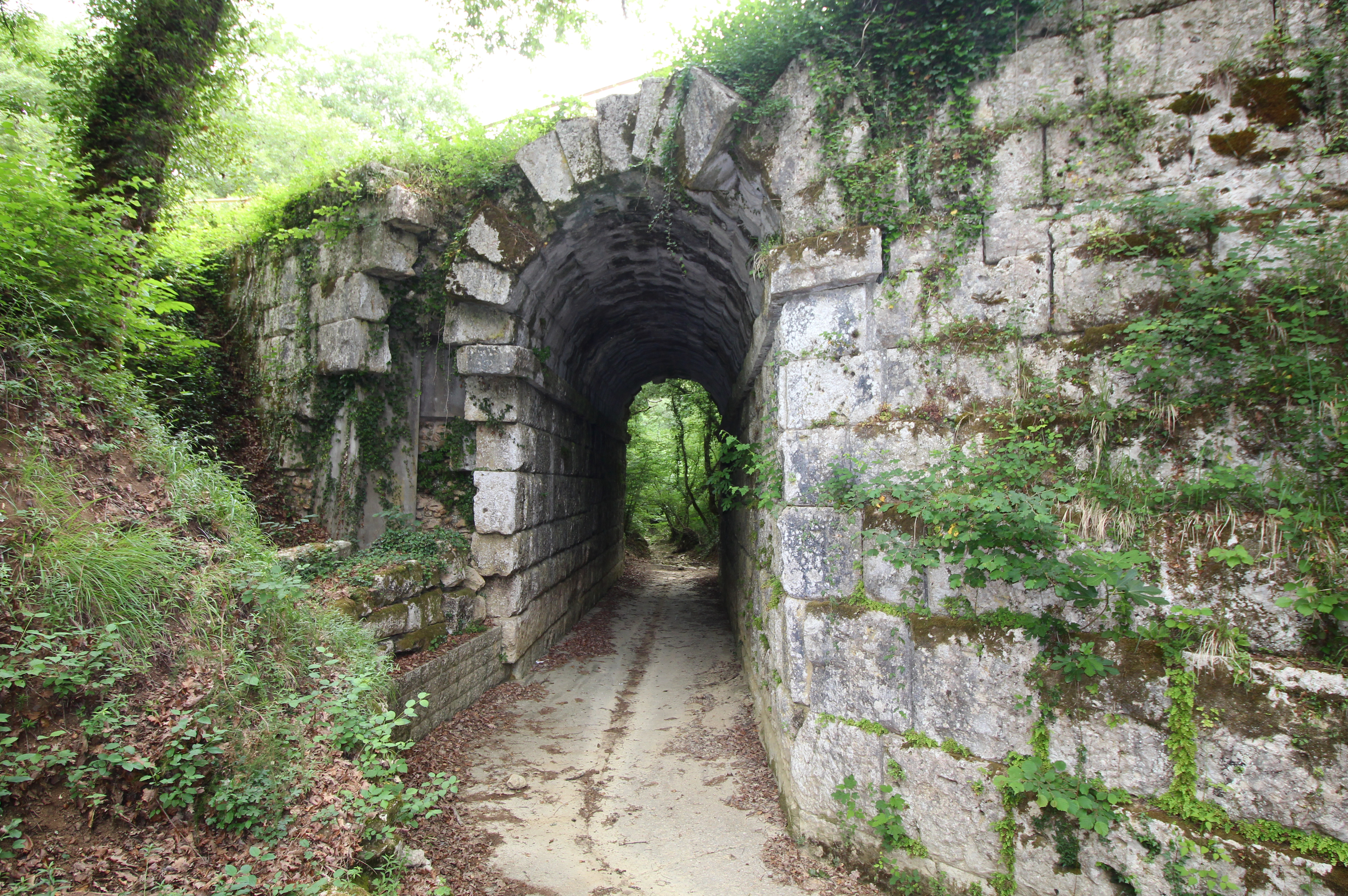
Ponte Fonnaia

Ponte Fonnaia is a Roman bridge constructed in 220 BC along the Via Flaminia. It consists of a single arch built from large, carefully cut travertine blocks and measures about 20 metres (66 ft) in width and 10 metres (33 ft) in height. The structure retains features of later restoration carried out in the Augustan period. It allowed the Via Flaminia to cross a tributary of the Naia, and the ancient road remains visible in the surrounding countryside.

=== Events ===
Massa Martana town has an annual ice-cream festival ("sagra del gelato") in early August each year. Similar food festivals are celebrated in summer months in a number of surrounding villages and hamlets within the commune, including Colpetrazzo and Villa San Faustino. During the Christmas period in Massa Martana is held a popular Christmas Exhibition, named "Presepi d'Italia" with Traditional Christmas Cribs and Art works: all dedicated to the Holy Nativity. The artworks are coming from all the Italian regions and are characterised by their local tradition and different culture.

== Notable people ==
From the area of Castelvecchio came Antonio Pacini da Todi, a Renaissance humanist. The bishop and saint Felice di Massa Martana is also associated with Massa Martana.

Among the notable families associated with Massa in the 19th century were the Francisci of Todi and the Orsini.
