= Bastardo, Giano dell'Umbria =

Bastardo
- Frazione
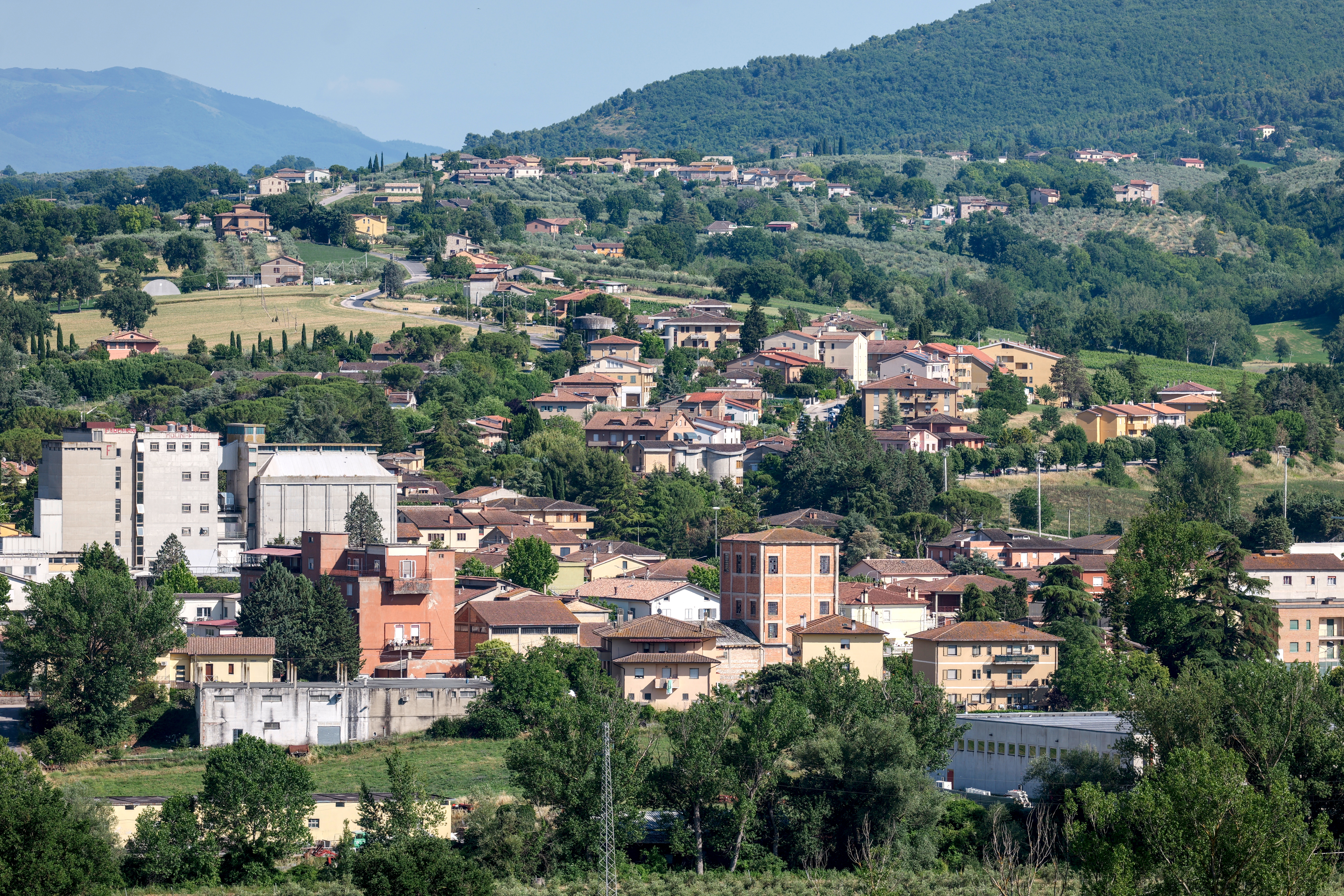
- Panorama of Bastardo

- Location of Bastardo in Italy
- Coordinates: 42°52′15″N 12°33′35″E
- Country: Italy
- Region: Umbria
- Province: Perugia (PG)
- Comune: Giano dell'Umbria
- Elevation: 290 m (950 ft)

Population (2021)
  - Total: 2,100
- Demonym: Bastardesi
- Time zone: UTC+1 (CET)
  - Summer (DST): UTC+2 (CEST)
- Postal code: 06030
- Dialing code: 0742

Bastardo is an Italian village and frazione (hamlet) of the municipality of Giano dell'Umbria, in the Province of Perugia, Umbria. As of 2021 its population was of 2,100.

Bastardo has been noted for its unusual place name.

== Etymology ==
The name Bastardo is linked to the presence of a roadside inn located at the junction of the Via Flaminia and the Via Tuderte. The settlement was known as Osteria del Bastardo ("Bastard's Inn") until 1933, when it was renamed "Bastardo".

Later spurious explanations associated the nickname with an early innkeeper of illegitimate birth, but the origin is ultimately from the inn itself.

Earlier documented forms include Cappanna del Bastardo ("Bastard's Hut", first recorded in 1492), and later variants such as Coupona and Bettola del Bastardo ("Bastard's Tavern"). Later proposals to change the name did not result in a permanent change.

== History ==
From the Roman period, Bastardo has been interpreted as a possible stopover point, suggesting the presence of an imperial administrative office and a road station comparable to those on the Via Flaminia at sites such as ad Martis and Mevania.

The earliest mention cited is from 1492, in an act drawn up by the Augustinians of the Abbey of San Felice, where the place appears as "Cappanna del Bastardo".

In 1536, the Statute of Giano required the innkeeper of Bastardo to make an annual offering of six pounds of white wax to the Conventual Franciscans of Giano on the feast day of Saint Francis.

Bastardo expanded notably from 1921 with the exploitation of local lignite deposits. Most output was sent to the steelworks in Terni. In 1923 work began on a thermoelectric power plant.

The mining complex closed completely in 1955. In the 1960s an Enel-led project sought to reopen extraction, but it was judged uneconomic; the power plant continued operating using imported liquid fuel.

== Geography ==
Bastardo is located in central Umbria in the valley of River Puglia, a tributary of the Tiber, at the altitude of 290 m (951 ft) above sea-level, Bastardo is 7 km far (about 4 mi) from Giano, 6 from Gualdo Cattaneo and 20 from Foligno. It is an agricultural products processing center that counts several hotels and restaurants, due to its location in a scenic area of Umbria.

== Religion and culture ==
Bastardo has a small neo-Gothic church dedicated to Saint Barbara, patron saint of miners. Construction began around the 1930s with donations from workers. Inside is a memorial plaque to people killed at work.

=== Ponte del Diavolo ===
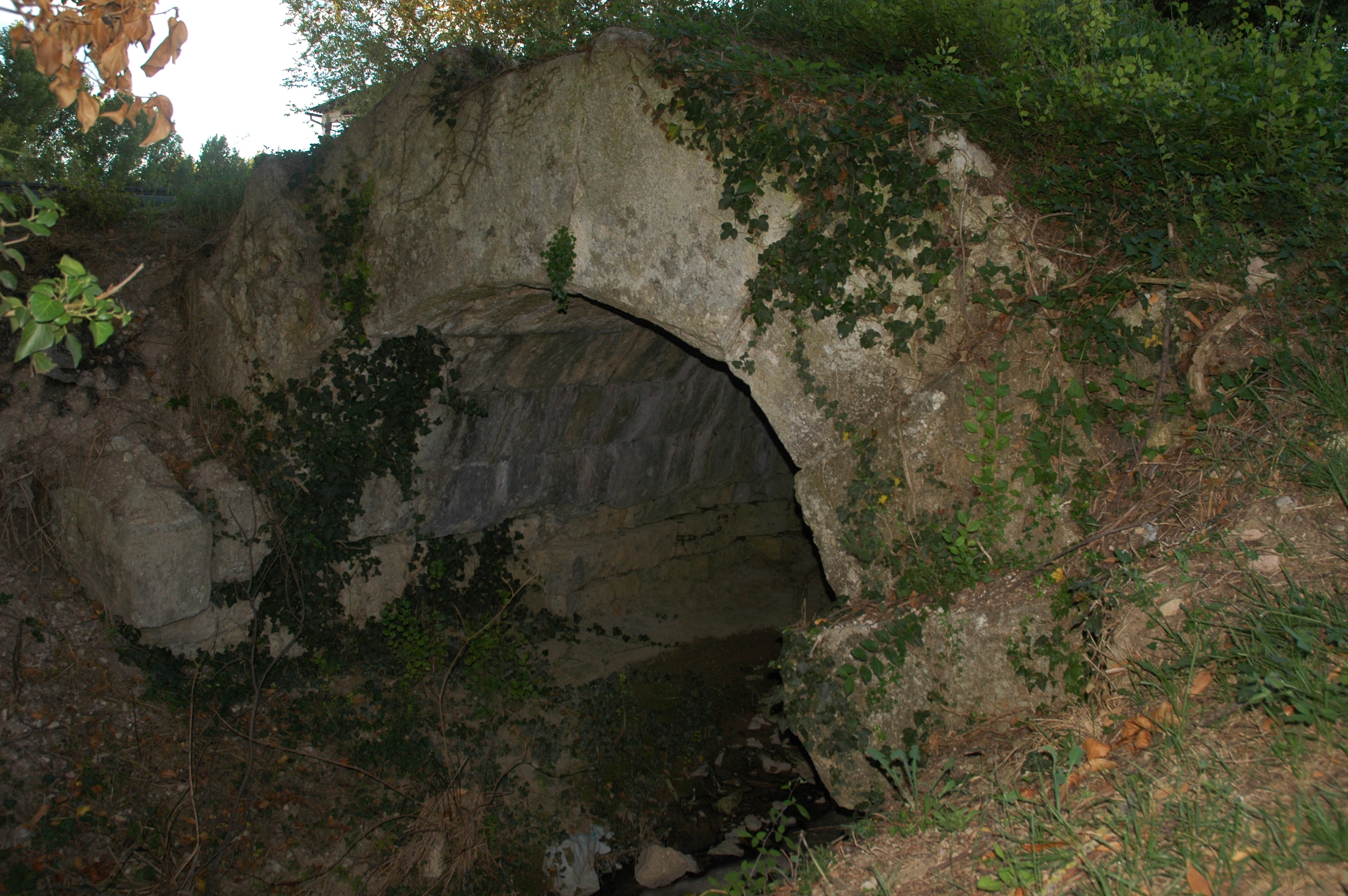
Ponte del Diavolo

Ponte del Diavolo is at Cavallara, near Bastardo, on the route of the older Via Flaminia. Built to cross a ditch flowing into the Puglia River, it is dated between the 2nd century BC and the Augustan age.

The bridge is a single-arch structure built of squared limestone blocks, using local grey limestone and travertine, and measures about 15 metres (49 ft) in width and 9 metres (30 ft) in length. It is largely hidden by vegetation and is in poor condition: the side facing the modern road is well preserved, while the end toward the countryside has collapsed.

An inscription is reported as "M.V.S.N C" (or possibly "V.S. IVC"), though its meaning is unclear. The bridge is compared for its features to bridges along the Via Flaminia such as the Fonnaja Bridge near Massa Martana and the San Giovanni de Butris bridge near Acquasparta.

=== Villa Rufione ===
Between Montecchio and Bastardo, along the Via Flaminia Vetus, are the remains of Villa Rufione, a large Roman rural villa. The complex originated in the late Republican period, and remained in use until the 4th century AD. It occupied a panoramic and strategic position midway between Vicus ad Martis and Mevania.

The villa has been attributed to Gaius Julius Rufio, the son of a freedman of Caesar.

Among the notable remains are a fine fragment of black-and-white mosaic, high-quality frescoes, and molded and painted stucco frames. Decorative architectural terracottas in the form of revetment plaques point to wealthy patronage.

== Main sights ==
- The Abbey of San Felice in Giano
- The little church of Madonna del Pianto

== Gallery ==
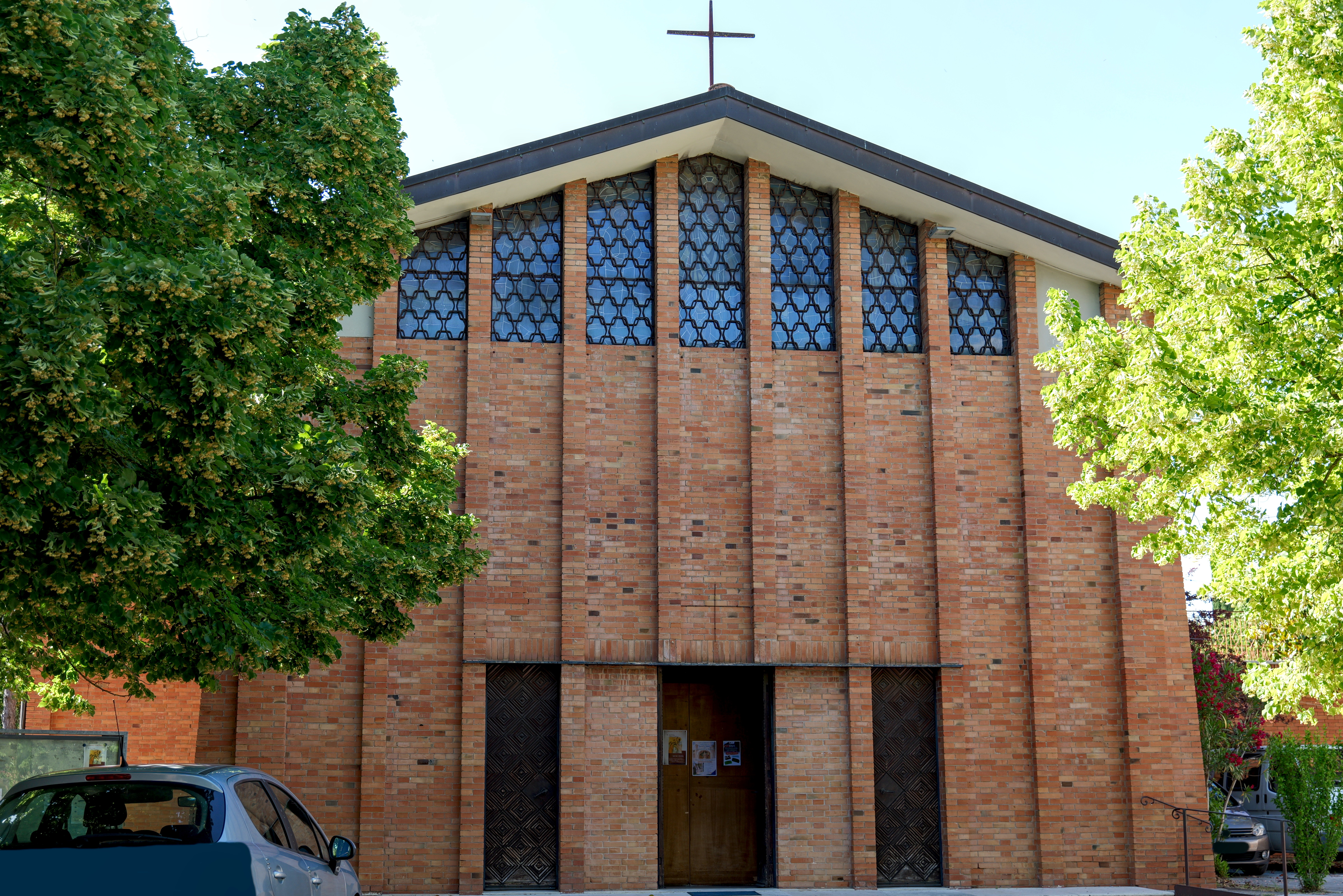
The church of San Francesco d'Assisi in the village center

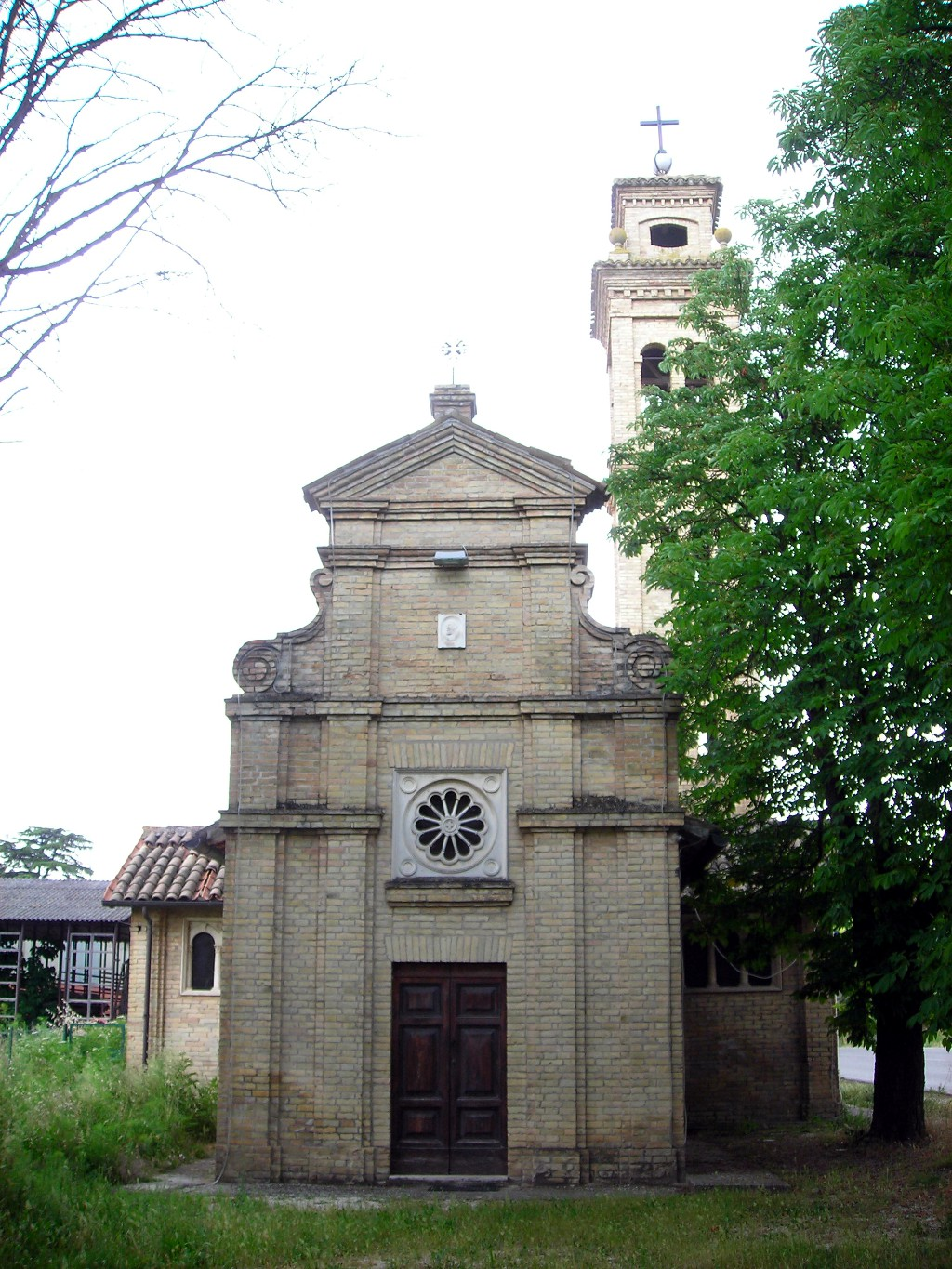
The church of Santa Barbara just outside the village center

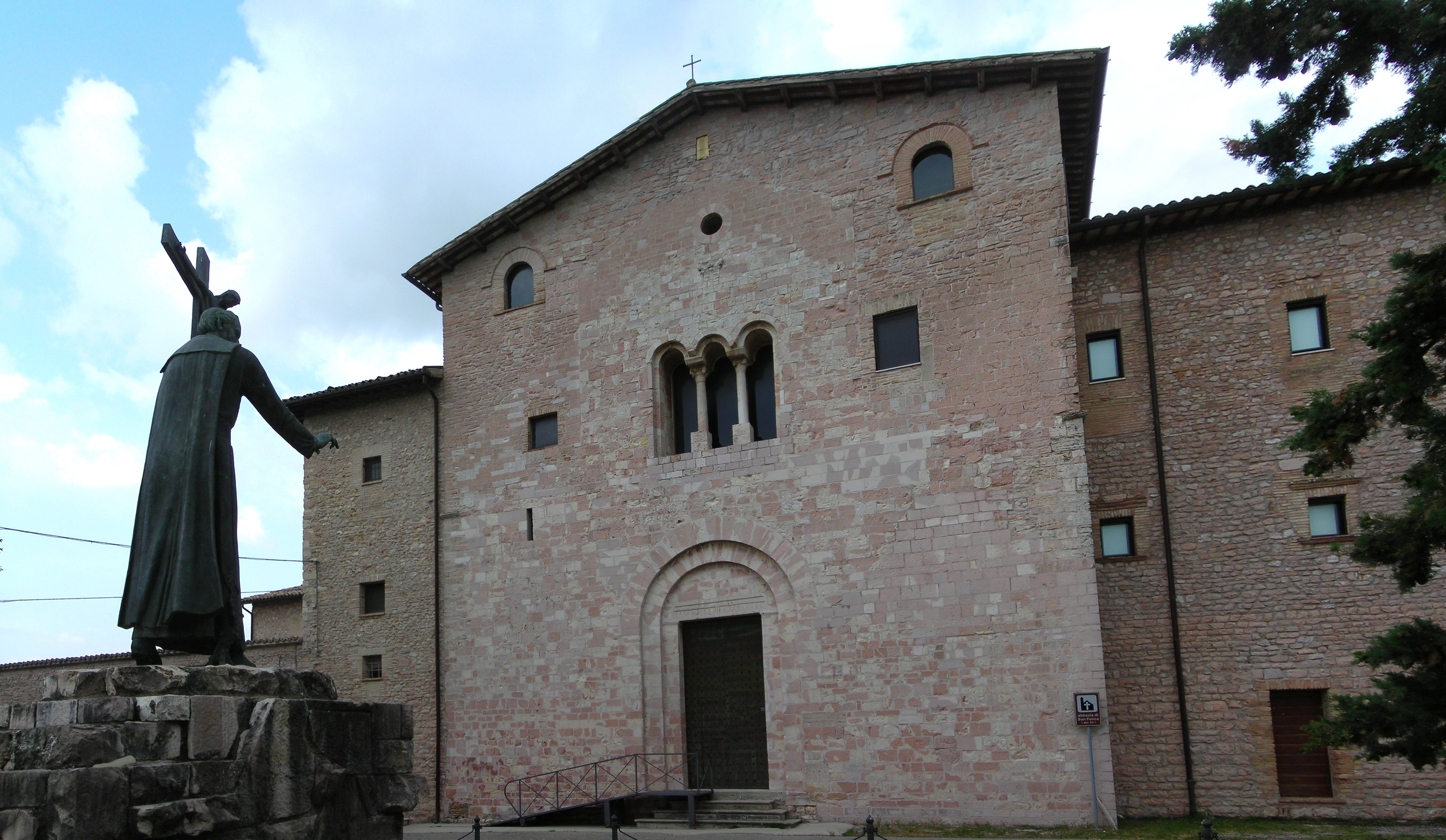
The Abbey of San Felice outside Bastardo

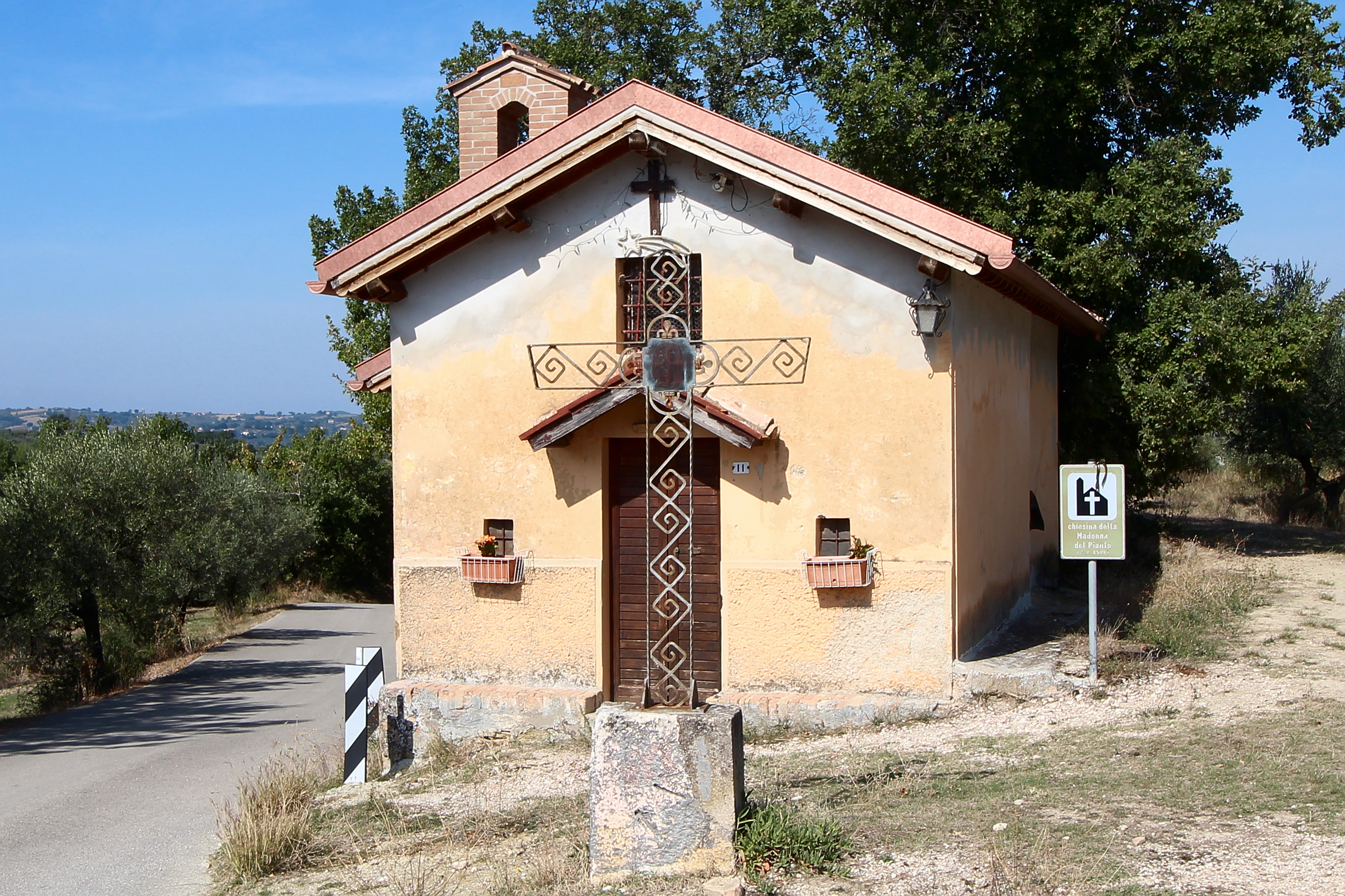
The church of Madonna del Pianto near Castagnola
