= Isola =

Isola may refer to:

== Places and jurisdictions ==
=== France ===
- Isola, Alpes-Maritimes, a municipality in the region Provence-Alpes-Côte d'Azur
- Isola 2000, a village and ski resort of the municipality of Isola, Provence-Alpes-Côte d'Azur
- Isole, a river in Brittany

=== Italy ===
Municipalities

- Isola d'Asti, in the Province of Asti, Piedmont
- Isola del Cantone, in the Province of Genoa, Liguria
- Isola del Giglio, in the Province of Grosseto, Tuscany
- Isola del Gran Sasso d'Italia, in the Province of Teramo, Abruzzo
- Isola del Liri, in the Province of Frosinone, Lazio
- Isola del Piano, in the Province of Pesaro and Urbino, Marche
- Isola della Scala, in the Province of Verona, Veneto
- Isola delle Femmine, in the Province of Palermo, Sicily
- Isola di Capo Rizzuto, in the Province of Crotone, Calabria
  - the former bishopric of Isola with see in the above town, now a titular Latin catholic see
- Isola di Fondra, in the Province of Bergamo, Lombardy
- Isola Dovarese, in the Province of Cremona, Lombardy
- Isola Rizza, in the Province of Verona, Veneto
- Isola Sant'Antonio, in the Province of Alessandria, Piedmont
- Isola Vicentina, in the Province of Vicenza, Veneto
- Isolabona, in the Province of Imperia, Liguria
- Isole Tremiti, in the Province of Foggia, Apulia
- Capraia Isola, in the Province of Livorno, Tuscany
- Chignolo d'Isola, in the Province of Bergamo, Lombardy
- Monte Isola, in the Province of Brescia, Lombardy
- Terno d'Isola, in the Province of Bergamo, Lombardy
- Torre d'Isola, in the Province of Pavia, Lombardy

Other

- Isola (district of Milan), a district of Milan, Lombardy
- Isola (Milan Metro), a subway station in Milan, Lombardy
- Isola, a frazione of San Miniato, Pisa, Tuscany
- Isola Maggiore, a frazione of Tuoro sul Trasimeno, Perugia, Umbria

=== Malta ===
- Senglea, formerly known as l-Isola and also known as Isla

=== Slovenia ===
- Isola, the Italian name of Izola, a town on the Istrian peninsula

=== Switzerland ===
- Isola (Maloja), a village of Maloja, in Graubünden

=== United States ===
- Isola, Mississippi, a small town in the Mississippi Delta

== Fictional places ==
- Isola (fictional city), the setting of the 87th Precinct novels by Ed McBain. It is loosely based on New York City.
- Isola, a fictional island in the video game series Virtual Villagers
- Isola, name of the Philippines in the John Brunner novel Stand on Zanzibar
- Isola, a geographical feature from the video game Disco Elysium

== Other ==
- Isola (given name), the history and usage of the given name
- Isola (surname)
- Isola, first name of Oscar Wilde's adored little sister
- Isola (company), a manufacturer, distributor and installer of building materials for moisture control and energy efficiency
- Isola (album) by the Swedish rock band Kent
- Isola (board game)
- Isola, a camera made by Agfa
- Isola (comics), a 2018 comic created by Brenden Fletcher and Karl Kerschl, published by Image Comics
- Isola (film), a 2000 Japanese horror film
- Isola, the term for landmasses in the 2019 video game Disco Elysium
- Isola Group, a right-wing political faction in Gibraltar

== See also ==
- Izola (disambiguation)
