= Isolde (given name) =

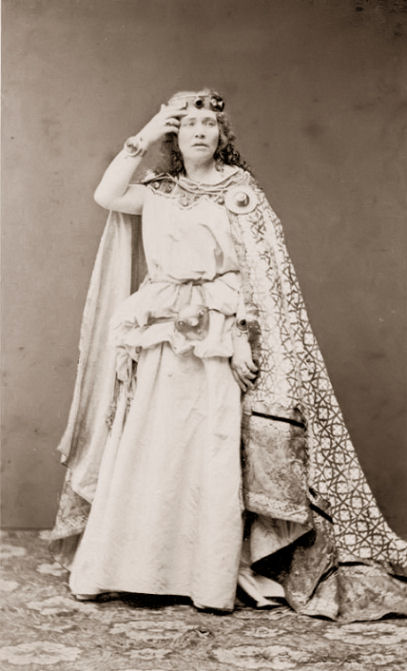
- Malvina Garrigues, Portuguese operatic soprano and first person in the role of Isolde in Richard Wagner's Tristan und Isolde (1865)
- Pronunciation: /ˌɪˈzɒldəˌɪˈsɒldə/
- Gender: Female
- Language: German
- Name day: 23 August (Germany)

Origin
- Meaning: īs ("ice") hiltja ("battle").

Other names
- Variant forms: Iseult, Yseult, Ysolt, Isode, Isoude, Iseut, Iosóid, Esyllt, Isola, Isolda, Isotta, Izolda
- Derived: Old High German or Brythonic

Isolde is a German feminine given name derived from either the Old High German words īs ("ice") and hiltja ("battle"), or the Brythonic adsiltia ("she who is gazed upon"). The name was further popularized in Germany and German-speaking countries following the opera Tristan und Isolde composed by Richard Wagner between 1857 and 1859, and based on the 12th-century chivalric romance Tristan and Iseult. Wagner subsequently had a daughter in 1865, who was named Isolde von Bülow.

People bearing the name Isolde include:

- Isolde Ahlgrimm (1914–1995), Austrian harpsichordist and fortepianist
- Isolde Barth (born 1948), German actress
- Isolde Eisele (born 1953), German rower
- Isolde Frölian (1908–1957), German gymnast
- Isolde Hausser (1889–1951), German physicist
- Isolde Kostner (born 1975), Italian alpine skier
- Isolde Kurz (1853–1944), German poet and short story writer
- Isolde Lasoen (born 1979), Belgian musician and singer
- Isolde Liebherr (born 1949), German-Swiss businessperson and entrepreneur
- Isolde Menges (1893–1976), English violinist
- Isolde Ries (born 1956), German politician
