= Isola Polvese =

Island in Italy

Coordinates: 43°07′N 12°09′E

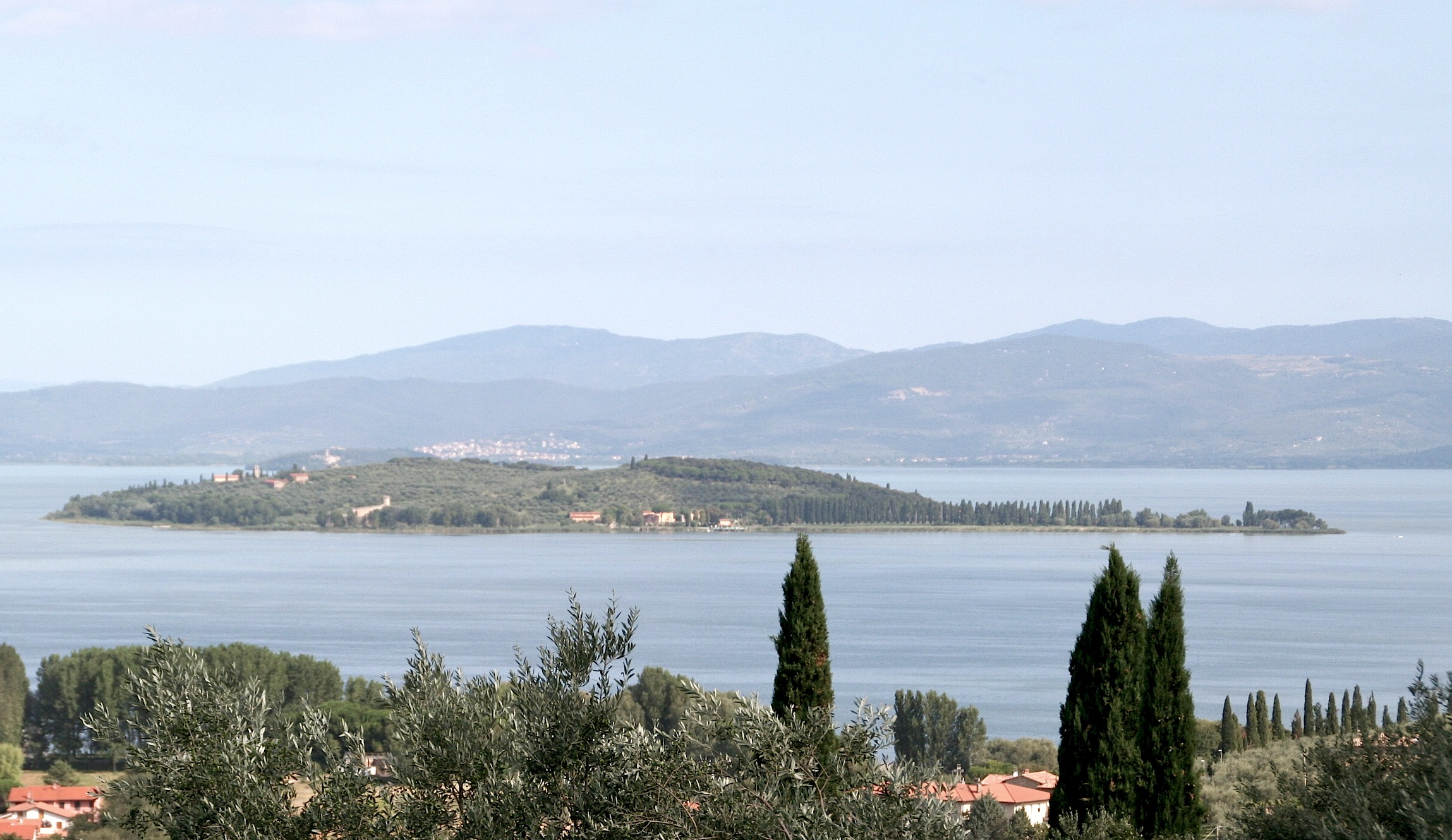
Isola Polvese

Isola Polvese or Polvese Island is an island located in the southeastern part of Lake Trasimeno, in the Umbria region of Italy. Together with Isola Maggiore and Isola Minore, it is one of the three islands in the lake, and the largest of them, with an area of about 70 hectares (170 acres).

According to the 2021 Italian census, the island had no permanent residents. (Note: Population data from the 2021 census: Municipality code 54009 – Castiglione del Lago, census section 441: population 0.; Municipality code 54009 – Castiglione del Lago, census section 129: population 0.) Today it exists primarily as a protected natural area within the Trasimeno Regional Park, administratively part of the municipality of Castiglione del Lago and owned by the Province of Perugia.

In the Middle Ages, the island's inhabitants were ruled by Perugia. During that period, churches and a fortress were built. Monks from the Benedictines and Dominican orders were also present on the island during different periods of its history, contributing to its cultural and religious significance.

== Etymology ==
The origin of the island's name is uncertain. One hypothesis suggests that in the feudal period it was called Pulvensis, possibly derived from the Latin pulvis ("dust"). This interpretation is generally rejected, however, since it would imply a barren and windswept environment, which contrasts with the island's historically attested dense vegetation.

== History ==
Historical population
Year	Pop.	±%
1410	83	—
1656	89	+7.2%
1701	46	−48.3%
1708	46	+0.0%
1736	34	−26.1%
1836	42	+23.5%
1880	39	−7.1%
1961	15	−61.5%
1971	6	−60.0%
2021	0	−100.0%

=== Antiquity and the Middle Ages ===
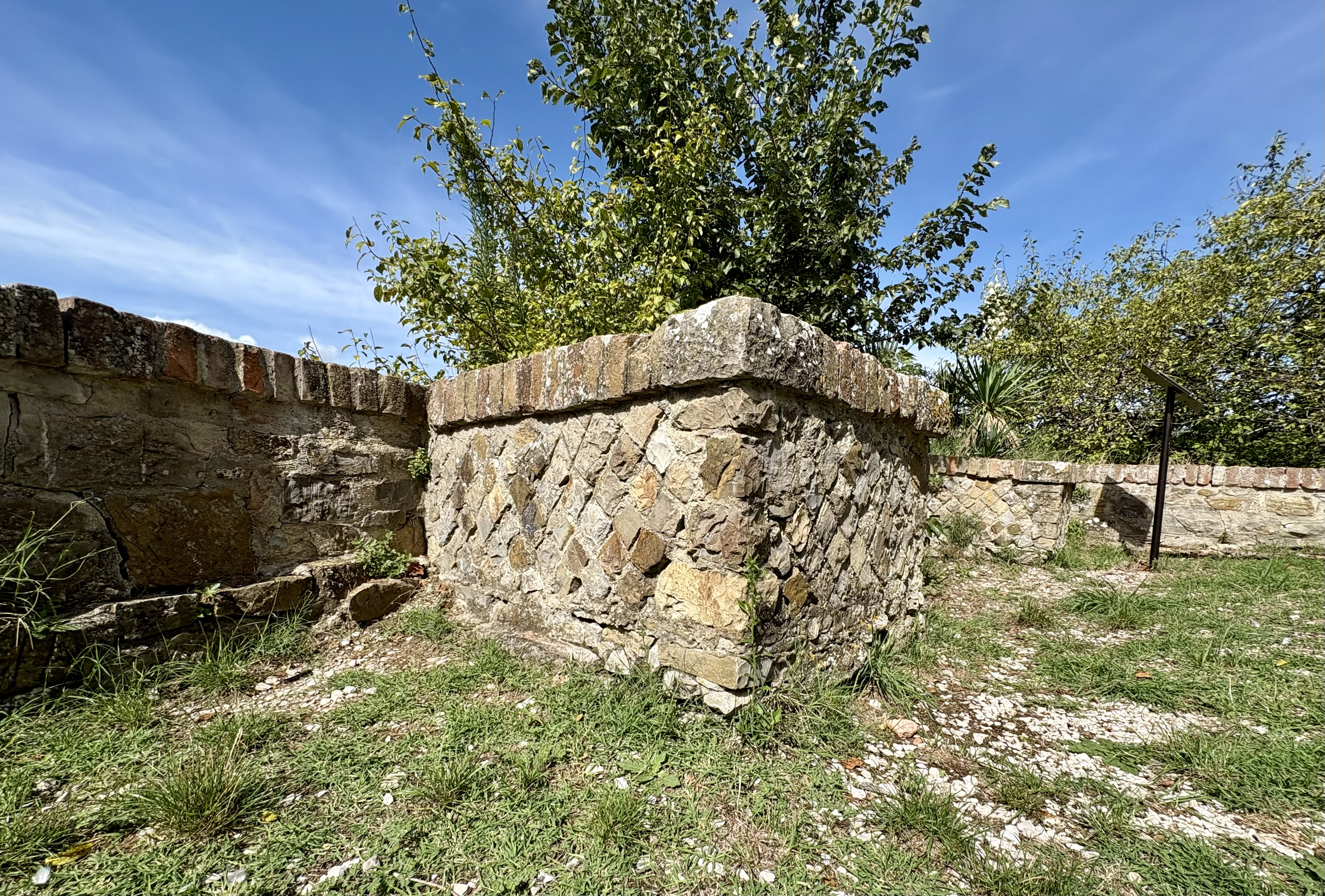
Remains of a Roman-era wall in opus reticulatum, near the church of San Giuliano

According to a historical tradition, the island was populated in antiquity by refugees who fled surrounding settlements during the devastations caused by Hannibal's campaigns in the region. Archaeological evidence indicates a stable Roman presence: in front of the church of San Giuliano there are remains of an external retaining wall built in opus reticulatum.

The earliest surviving documentary reference to Polvese Island dates to 817, when Emperor Louis the Pious confirmed to the Church of Rome the earlier donations made by Pepin the Short and Charlemagne. Subsequent imperial confirmations followed in 926, when Otto I reaffirmed these grants to Pope John XII, and again in 1011.

On 7 May 1130, the inhabitants of Polvese Island, acting through their commissioners, formally submitted to the Comune of Perugia, pledging obedience to its consuls and agreeing not to admit counts, castellans, or nobles to the island without Perugian authorization. In May 1139, representatives of Polvese renewed and expanded this submission, pledging loyalty to Perugia's consuls, agreeing to follow Perugia in peace and war, to pay imposed taxes, and to deliver an annual tribute of fish (specifically tench).

In 1278, the inhabitants of Polvese Island, gathered at the castle of San Feliciano, appointed Bartolo di Guidolfo as their procurator to swear loyalty to the ordinances of the Captain of the People of Perugia and his successors. Much of the island's land was then under cultivation, with vineyards worked by 88 resident families in 1279.

In 1383, during the military campaigns of the condottiero Boldrino da Panicale, Polvese Island suffered a violent sack. The inhabitants were cut off from escape and the settlement was subjected to looting and destruction by Boldrino's troops.

=== Early Modern period ===
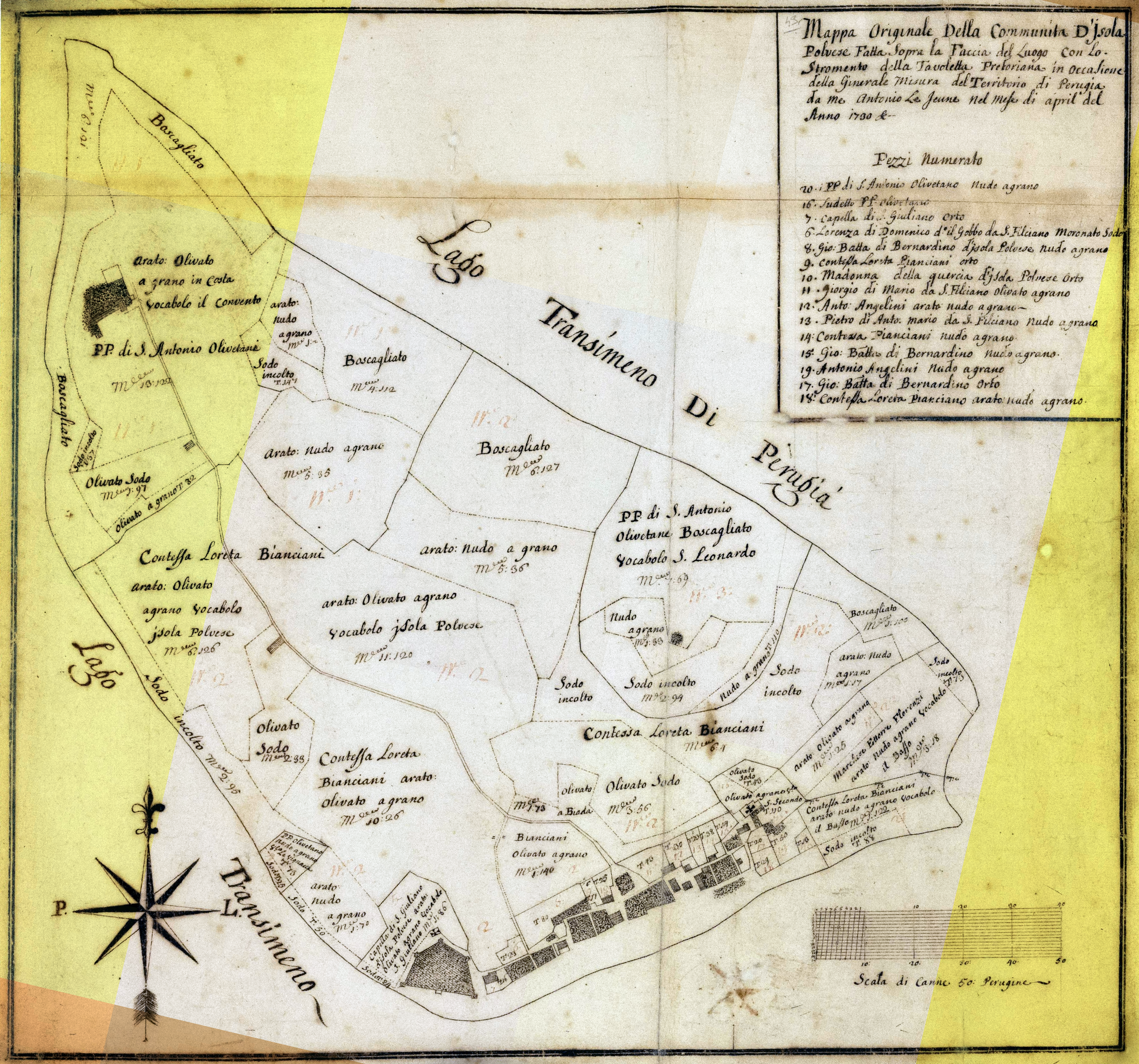
1730 map of the island

By 1410, Polvese Island was recorded as having 83 inhabitants. During the early 15th century, Polvese Island possessed its own small flotilla of boats, reportedly numbering eight vessels. According to contemporary accounts by Giovanni Antonio Campano, during the campaigns of Braccio da Montone in the Trasimeno area, the inhabitants of Polvese Island dismantled their boats and ultimately surrendered the island to him.

Around 1430, financial records mention Mone del Giusto, syndic and procurator of the community of Polvese Island, authorizing payments for expenses incurred and to be incurred in the ongoing construction of the fortress on the island. On 19 February 1459, Pope Pius II was received on Polvese Island while traveling toward Mantua. In 1495, Polvese Island was occupied by Perugian exiles.

In 1519, the monk Teodoro di Giovanni Scutariotto, a self-styled claimant to the role of the prophesied Pope Angelico, took refuge on Polvese Island after escaping imprisonment, briefly gathering followers there before again attracting the attention of ecclesiastical authorities.

In 1632, Polvese Island served as a place of refuge for Charles, Duke of Guise, who sought shelter there with his family after fleeing the outbreak of plague in Florence. In 1643, Polvese Island was sacked by the Florentine army commanded by Prince Mattias de' Medici, brother of Ferdinand II, Grand Duke of Tuscany.

Papal-era population censuses record 89 inhabitants on Polvese Island in 1656, 46 inhabitants in 1701, the same number again in 1708, followed by a decline to 34 inhabitants by 1736.

Following the French invasion and the proclamation of the Roman Republic in 1798, the island was administratively incorporated into the canton of Castiglione del Lago.

=== Modern era ===
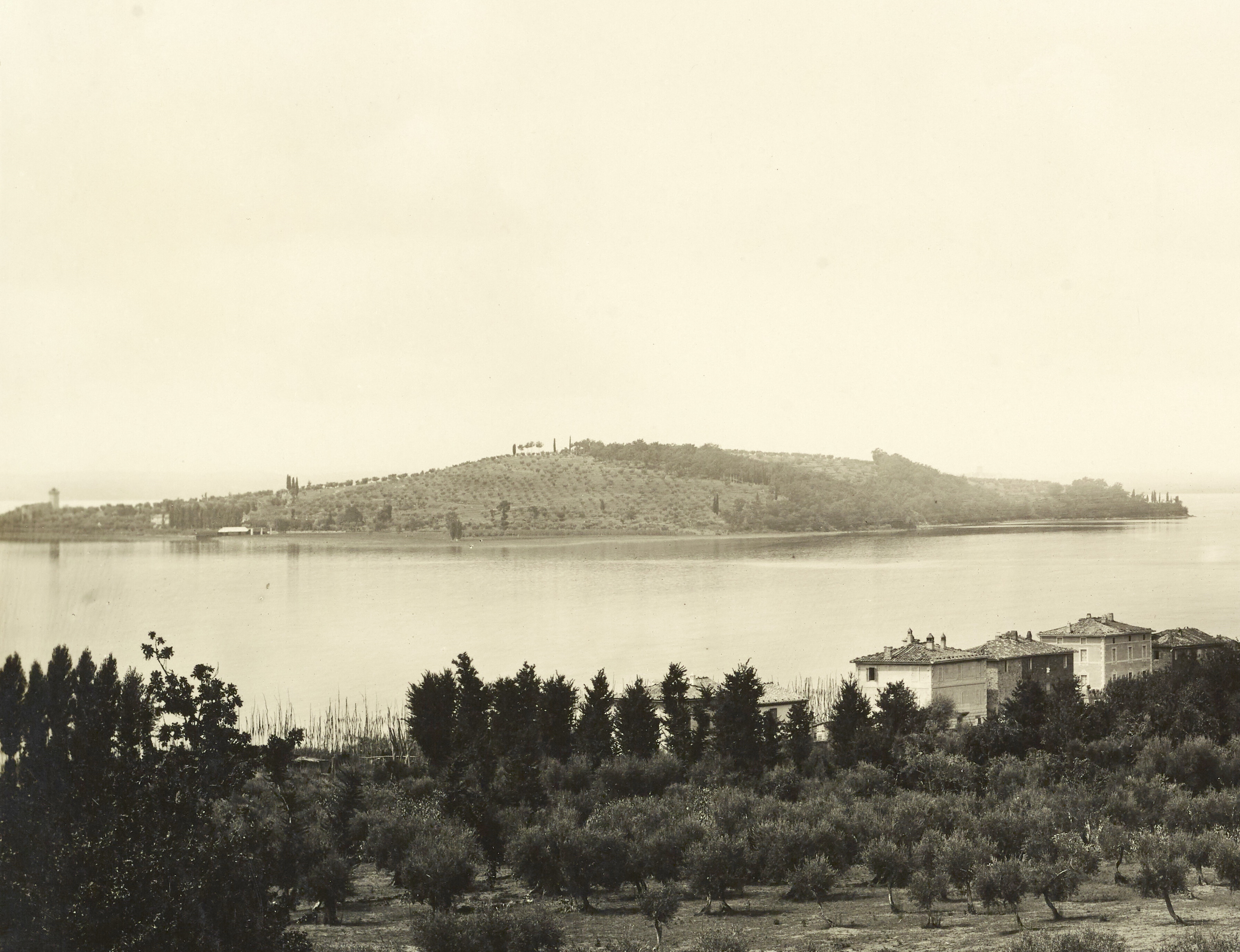
View of the island in the 1890s

In the early 19th century, the island was administratively recorded as a frazione of Castiglione del Lago, under the government, district, delegation, and diocese of Perugia. An 1836 papal-era gazetteer lists the island as having a population of 42 inhabitants.

In the late 19th century, Polvese Island passed from the Pianciani family to the ownership of Ferdinando Cesaroni, following land acquisitions completed between 1887 and 1888. Cesaroni used the island as a hunting estate, introducing pheasants, hares, and other game. He regularly reached the island by steamboat, reportedly the only motor vessel operating on Lake Trasimeno at the time, and organized hunting expeditions attended by guests from Florence, Rome, and Perugia. By 1880, the island's population had declined slightly to 39 inhabitants.

Civil registration records from the turn of the 20th century document the presence of the Sportellini, Dolciami, and Magnani families, all listed as coloni (tenant farmers), as well as the Pompei family, identified as fishers. In 1904, the inhabitants of the island submitted a formal petition requesting separation from Castiglione del Lago and administrative aggregation with the municipality of Magione. The island remains administratively part of Castiglione del Lago in contemporary governance.

In 1939, Biagio Biagiotti initiated the construction of various buildings and roads, alongside planting numerous olive trees all around the island. By the 1960s the island was owned by the aristocratic Citterio family. Contemporary accounts describe the island as a venue for elite leisure and hunting, frequented by high-ranking guests, including Prince Bernhard of the Netherlands.

By the time of the 1971 Italian census, the resident population had fallen to just six people. In 1973, the Province of Perugia acquired Polvese Island from the real estate company NECIT, owned by Marchese Citterio, for 850 million lire (equivalent to approximately $10.6 million in today's US dollars), with the aim of preserving its historical heritage and opening it to public and cultural use. In 1974, Polvese Island was officially declared a wildlife protection oasis.

== Mythology and folklore ==
In local mythology, Polvese Island was said to be the dwelling of the nymph Agylle (also rendered Agilla or Egille), who fell in love with Trasimenus, a prince and son of the Etruscan god Tyrrhenus. After Trasimenus drowned in the lake, the nymph was said to have died searching for him, and her lament was traditionally believed to be heard in the wind and waves of Lake Trasimeno.

The legend of Agylle and Trasimenus is attested in classical literature no later than the 1st century AD. In Book V of the Punica, the Roman poet Silius Italicus recounts a myth in which the nymph Agylle seizes the youth Trasimene and draws him beneath the waters, from whom the lake is said to have taken its name.

== Geography and environment ==
=== Landscape ===
The north of Polvese Island is covered in oak woodlands, including plants endemic to the Mediterranean such as holm and ash trees. In the lower woods, trees like guelder rose, laurel, ilex, and privet can be found. The southern area is covered by centuries-old olive trees. An extensive reed thicket that runs from the east to the south defines the humid region. The walkways and the interior of the island are characterized by rosemary hedges and pomegranates, while ornamental plants and trees are found everywhere over the meadows. The island hosts diverse fauna including foxes, martens, hares, and a wide variety of birds, particularly coots, ducks, and herons.

=== Garden ===
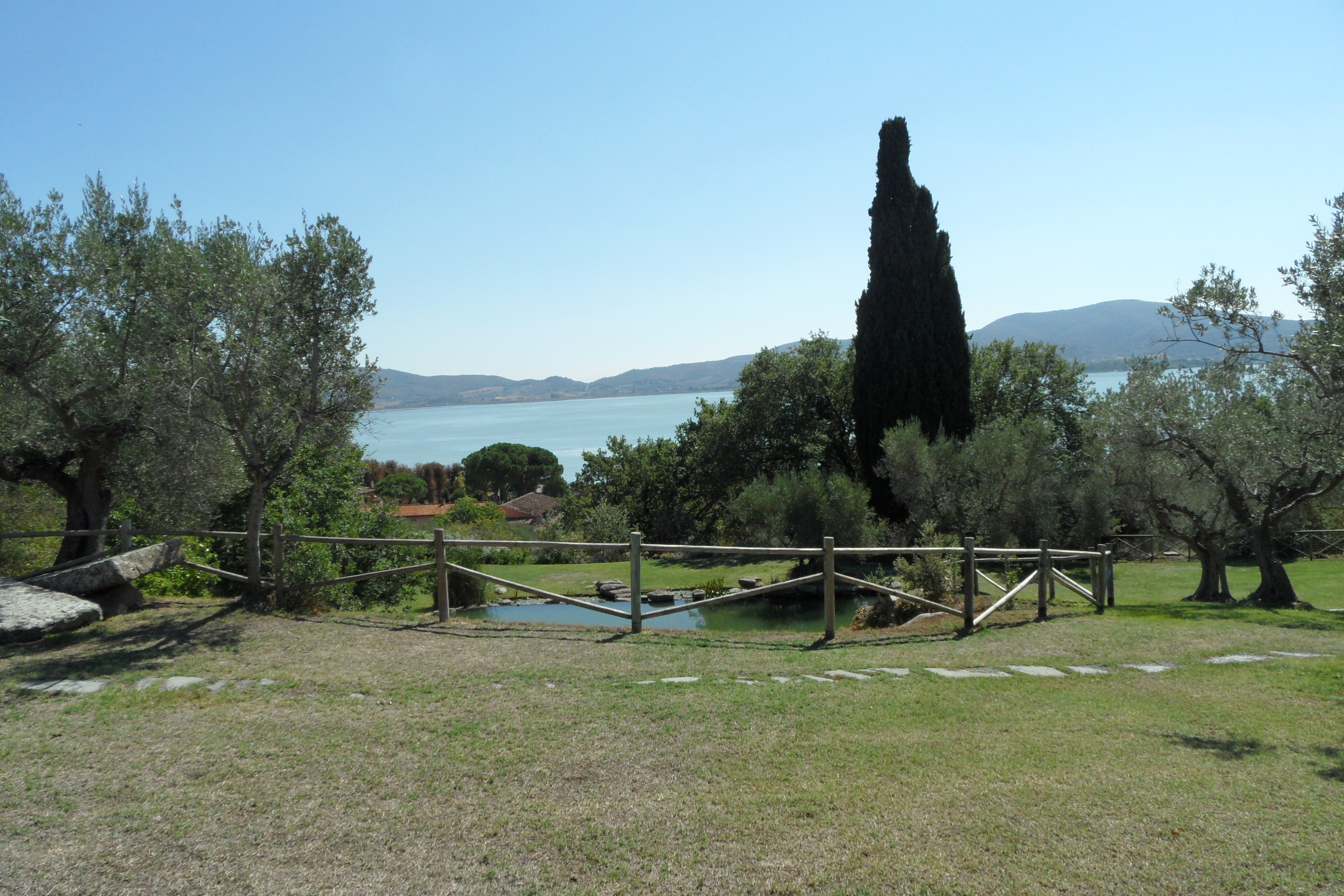
Garden landscape on Polvese Island overlooking Lake Trasimeno

In 1959, the Island of Polvese's garden underwent a comprehensive redesign by Italian landscape architect Pietro Porcinai at the behest of Count Giannino Citterio. Porcinai's project included the overhaul of various features, including the landing stage, tennis court, and a swimming pool carved from an abandoned sandstone quarry. The landing stage, characterized by a wooden horseshoe-shaped jetty, now incorporates willow-lined rows descending to the water's edge, replacing former flowerbeds, with the introduction of a herb garden as part of the new segmented layout.

The abandoned sandstone quarry was repurposed into a garden of aquatic plants, featuring a nature-like basin suitable for swimming, with a depth of up to 5.30 metres (17.4 ft). Porcinai's design included a series of interconnected "nymphs" around the basin, each hosting selected native and non-native aquatic plants. Particular attention was dedicated by Porcinai to generate for those who had plunged into the pool the feeling of continuity with the Trasimeno Lake. The meadow encircling the pool and nymphs bears olive trees and large stone slabs from the former quarry, strategically used as sunbathing "drying racks." Porcinai also incorporated typical Mediterranean climate plants like myrtle, strawberry trees, thyme, and lavender.

Additional features include changing rooms and water treatment facilities discreetly positioned beneath the embankment, accessible via a sandstone path. It initially served as a hunting lodge and holiday home for the Citterio counts. In 1988 and 1995, the Province of Perugia dedicated efforts to the architectural and functional recovery of this landscape, ensuring its ongoing proper maintenance.

== Transport ==
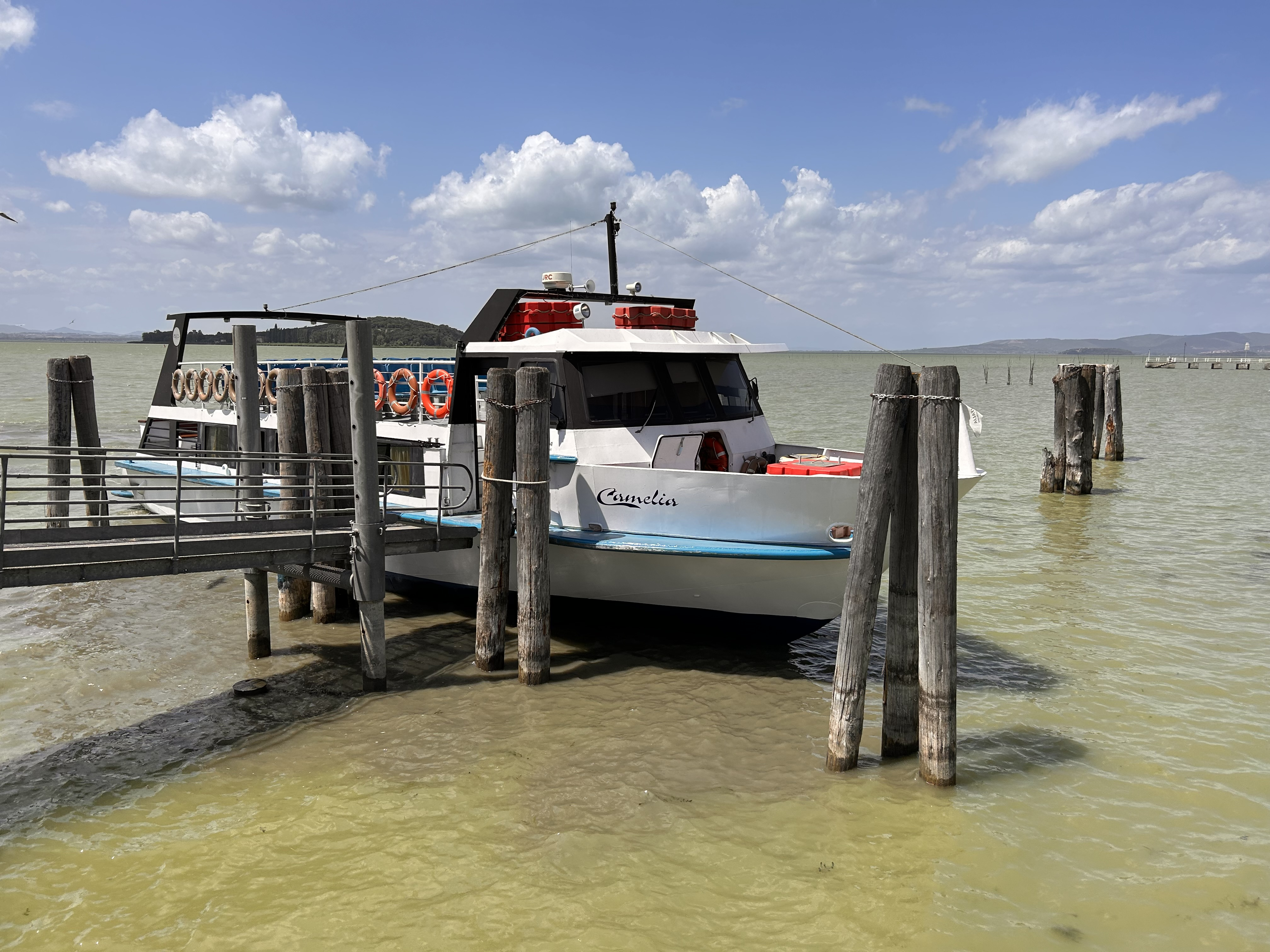
Passenger ferry docked at the pier

Polvese Island is accessible by boat via the Lake Trasimeno navigation service operated by Busitalia, with seasonal connections from several lakeside towns. Services are concentrated in the summer months, when regular routes link the island with the mainland.

== Heritage and monuments ==
Among the notable monuments of the island are the church of Saint Giuliano and Saint Secondo, the Olivetans’ Monastery of Saint Anthony, and the Medieval fortress. The Garden of Aquatic Plants was created in 1959 by the architect Pietro Porcinai as commissioned by Count Giannino Citterio.

=== Religious architecture ===
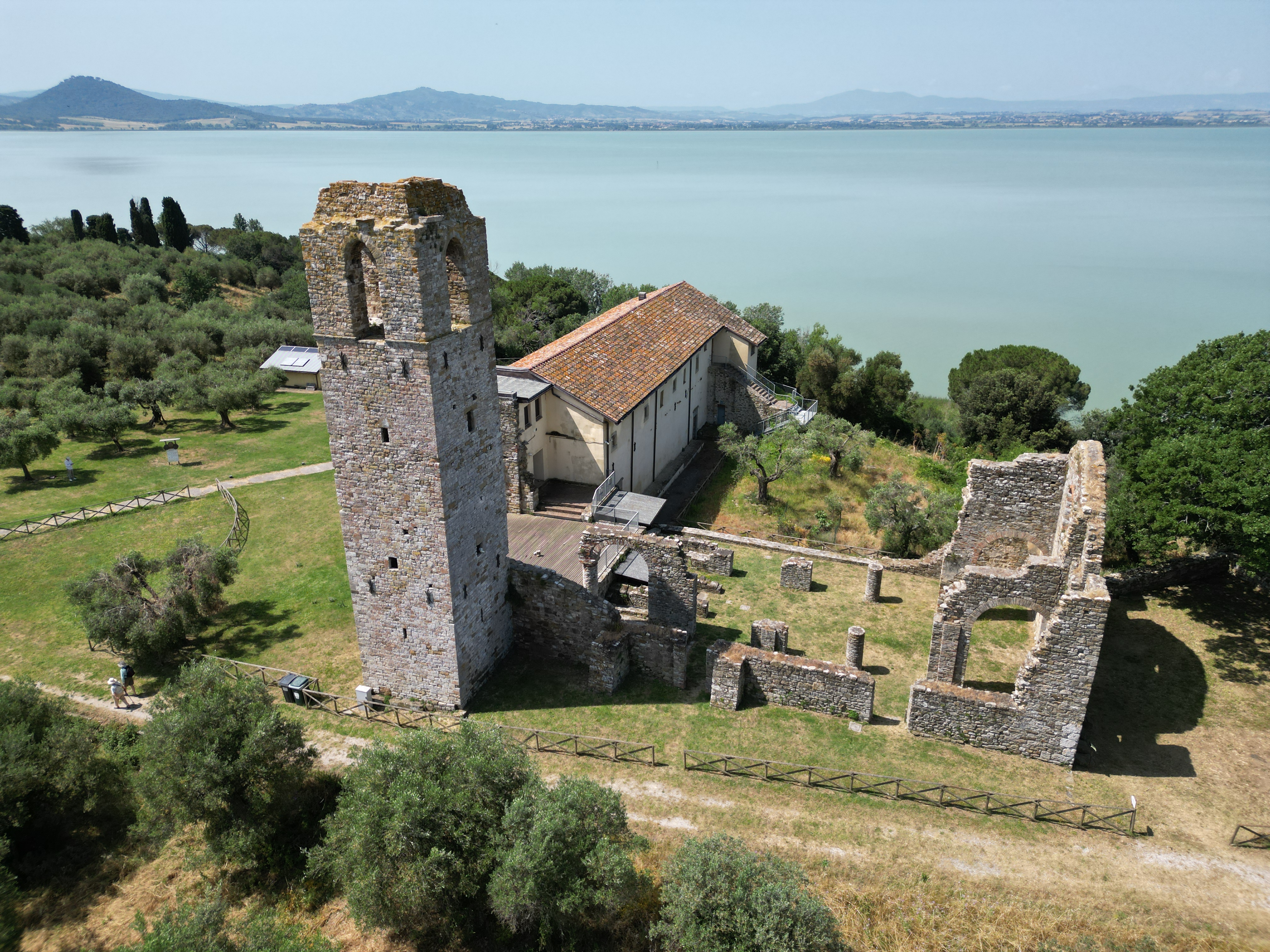
Ruins of the Convent of San Secondo

The remains of the former Convent of San Secondo constitute the most significant religious complex on Isola Polvese. The site was occupied by the Olivetan order between 1404 and 1624, during which time it functioned as an organized monastic settlement. Present-day remains are limited to the crypt and part of the convent building, including a 15th-century refectory.

The Church of San Giuliano, dating to the 13th century, is a medieval building characterized by a simple Umbrian Romanesque style, with stone masonry and an austere interior.

=== Fortress ===
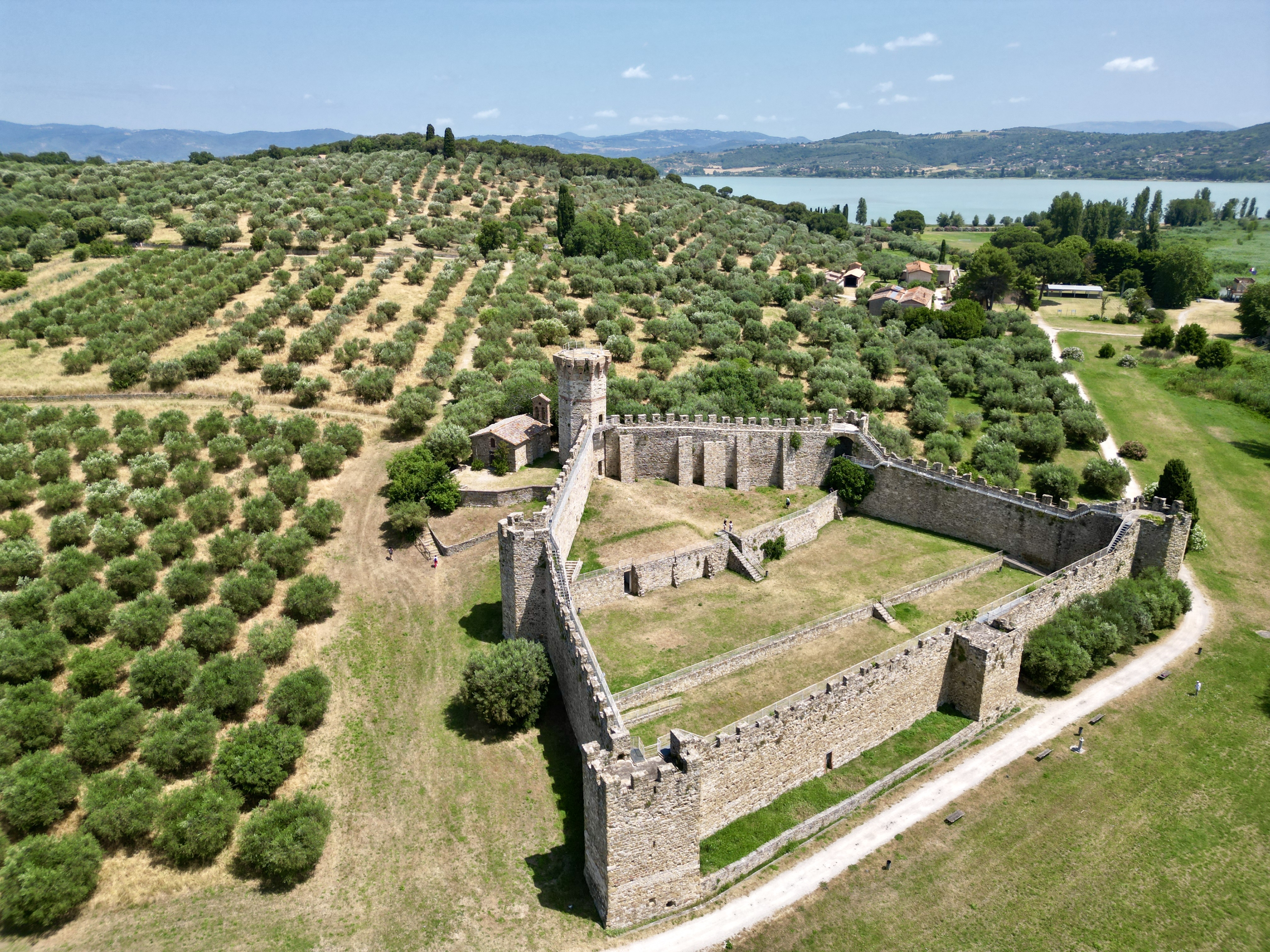
Fortress on Polvese Island

Near the end of the 14th century, various skirmishes for territorial supremacy resulted in considerable damage to the island and the destruction of most of the island’s boats and fishing equipment. This resulted in Polvese being almost completely abandoned.

In the 15th century, a small group of inhabitants decided to build a fortress to defend themselves and a small group of Olivetan monks who resided there. The Fortress consisted of five towers connected by a walkway and a sixth tower, which in the past gave direct access to the lake. It was built merely as a defense for the population and did not have the traditional structure of a lordly residence. However, for a brief period, before the occupation by the Grand Duchy of Tuscany in 1643, the fortress became the seat of the governor of the lake. It was mainly used as a military garrison and refuge to defend the same population of inhabitants and Olivetan monks settled on the island. The fortress was notably built with machicolations used to defend against assailants.

In the 17th century, the island went into a phase of decline: malaria and the humid climate forced the Olivetan monks to leave the monastery of Saint Anthony even before the occupation by the Grand Duchy of Tuscany. This led to the slow decay of the fortress, following which numerous structures were destroyed, and Polvese Island, which by then had a small number of inhabitants, began to pass into the hands of various noble families. After several changes of ownership through different important families in the 19th century, the order of Camaldolesi sold the fortress to Count Vincenzo Pianciani of Spoleto, who created a hunting reserve with pheasants and hares, and organized hunting parties attended by all the Umbrian and Roman nobility.

== Tourism and use ==
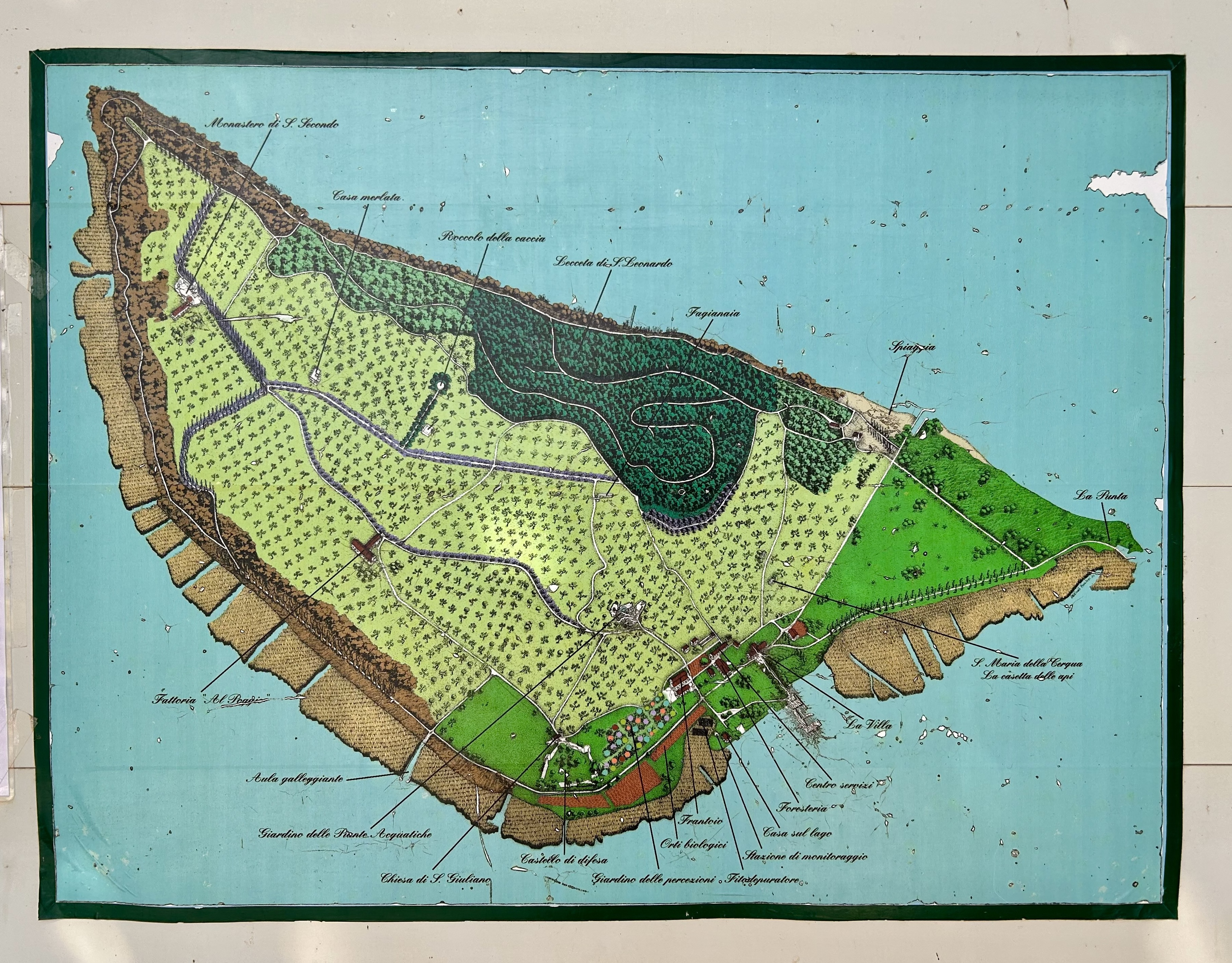
Map of Polvese Island

=== Activities ===
Since 1995, Polvese Island has been declared by the Province of Perugia as a "scientific-didactic park" dedicated to environmental education, didactic experimentation, scientific, naturalistic, and anthropological research.

=== Structures & services ===
- Great hall and Laboratory
- Punto Verde – Information
- Environmental Education Operators
- Umbria Mobilità – Public Boat Service
