= Isola Minore =

Small island in Lago Trasimeno, Italy

Coordinates: 43.17956°N 12.10293°E

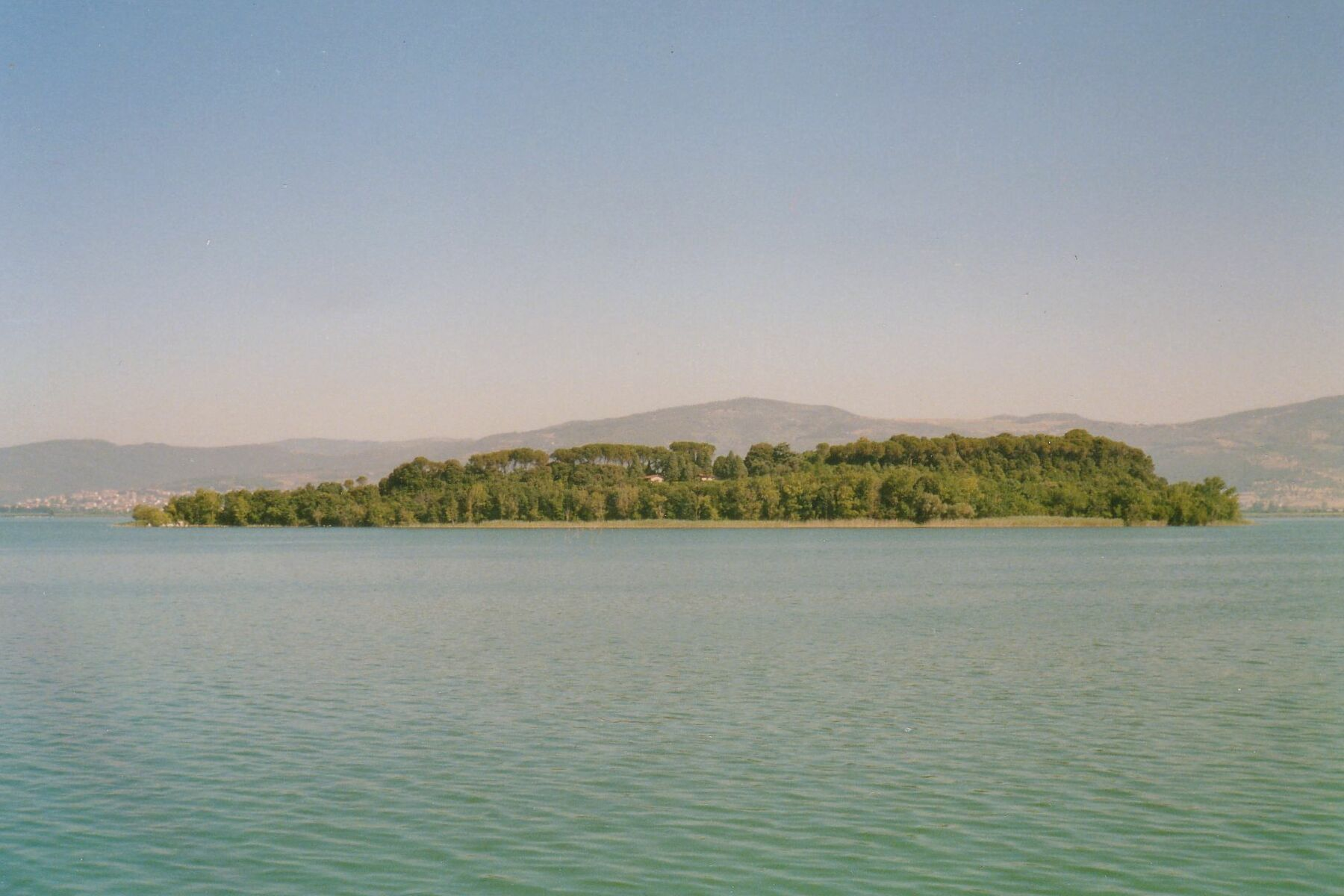
Isola Minore

Isola Minore (also known as Isoletta) is a small island in Lake Trasimeno, Italy.

The island is located at a distance of less than 500 metres (1,600 ft) from Isola Maggiore and covers an area of approximately 6 hectares (15 acres). It falls within the municipal territory of Passignano sul Trasimeno.

Despite its limited size, Isola Minore was inhabited in antiquity and still preserves a few scant remains of building structures. The island is now privately owned, uninhabited, and not open to visitors.

== History ==
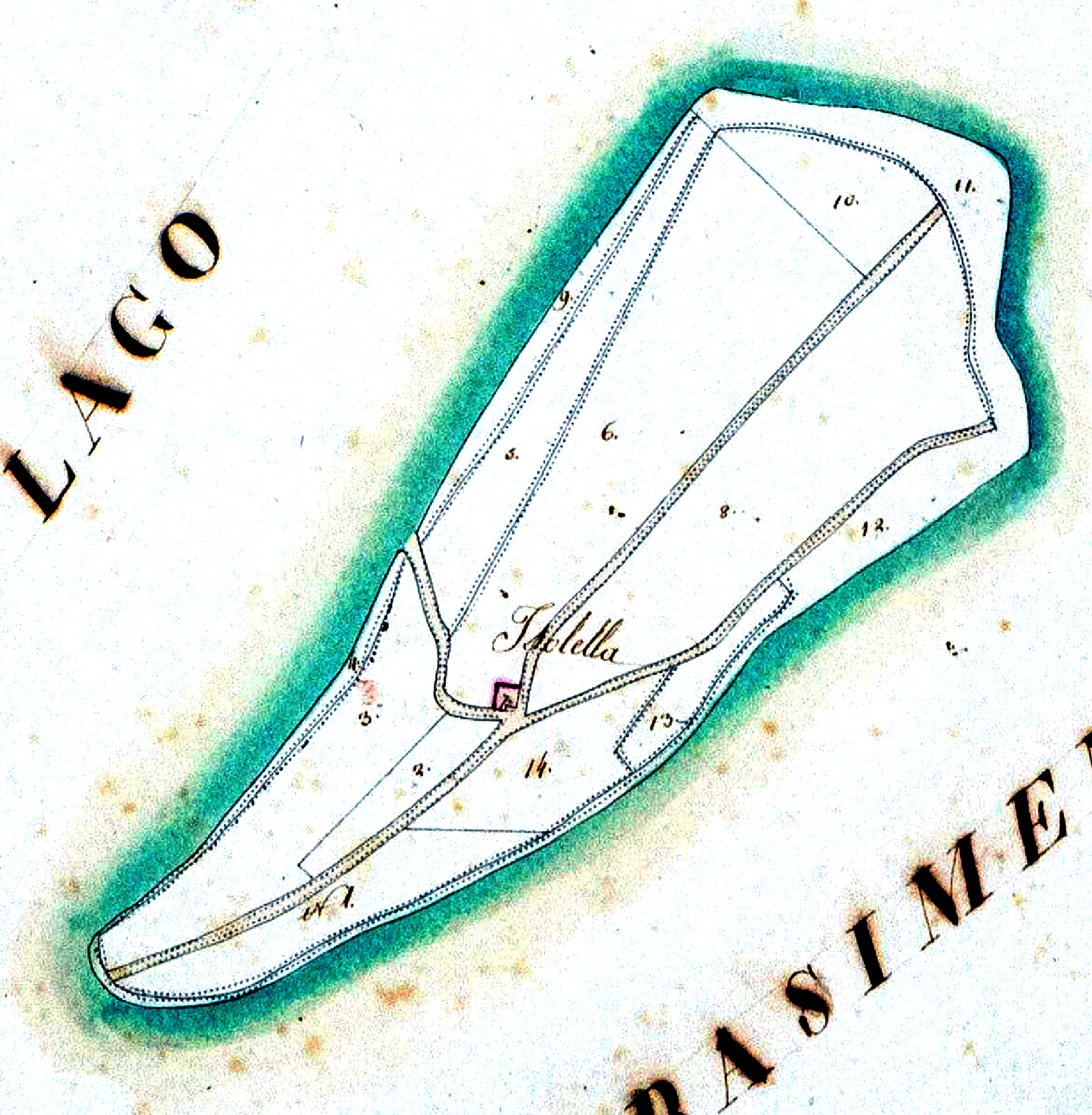
1820s map of the island

According to historical tradition, the earliest inhabitants of Isola Minore (like those of Isola Maggiore and Isola Polvese) were believed to have been refugees who fled to the islands following Roman defeats during Hannibal's campaign in the region.

In March 1174, the inhabitants of Isola Minore formally submitted to the authority of Perugia through a sworn agreement. The island was sufficiently inhabited for its residents to be subject to civic obligations, including an annual tribute of 200 tench owed to the magistrates of Perugia.

In the second half of the 15th century, the population of Isola Minore was forcibly removed by order of the Perugian authorities and transferred to the territory of Tuoro.

Francesco Beccuti noted that during the lifetime of Giovanni Antonio Campano (15th century) the island was uninhabited, a condition attributed to the large number of snakes present there. According to Annibale Mariotti, an eremite resided on Isola Minore during the 18th century.

In the mid-19th century, Isola Minore belonged to the Baldeschi family of Perugia. Human use of the island has since remained minimal, largely due to the lack of electrical infrastructure and the presence of only brackish, non-potable groundwater.

Ethnographic accounts published in 2024 report that, despite its status as private property, Isola Minore has occasionally been accessed without authorization by individuals using private boats, who land at the island's former mooring and enter the interior illegally to explore the site and its views.

== Geography and ecology ==
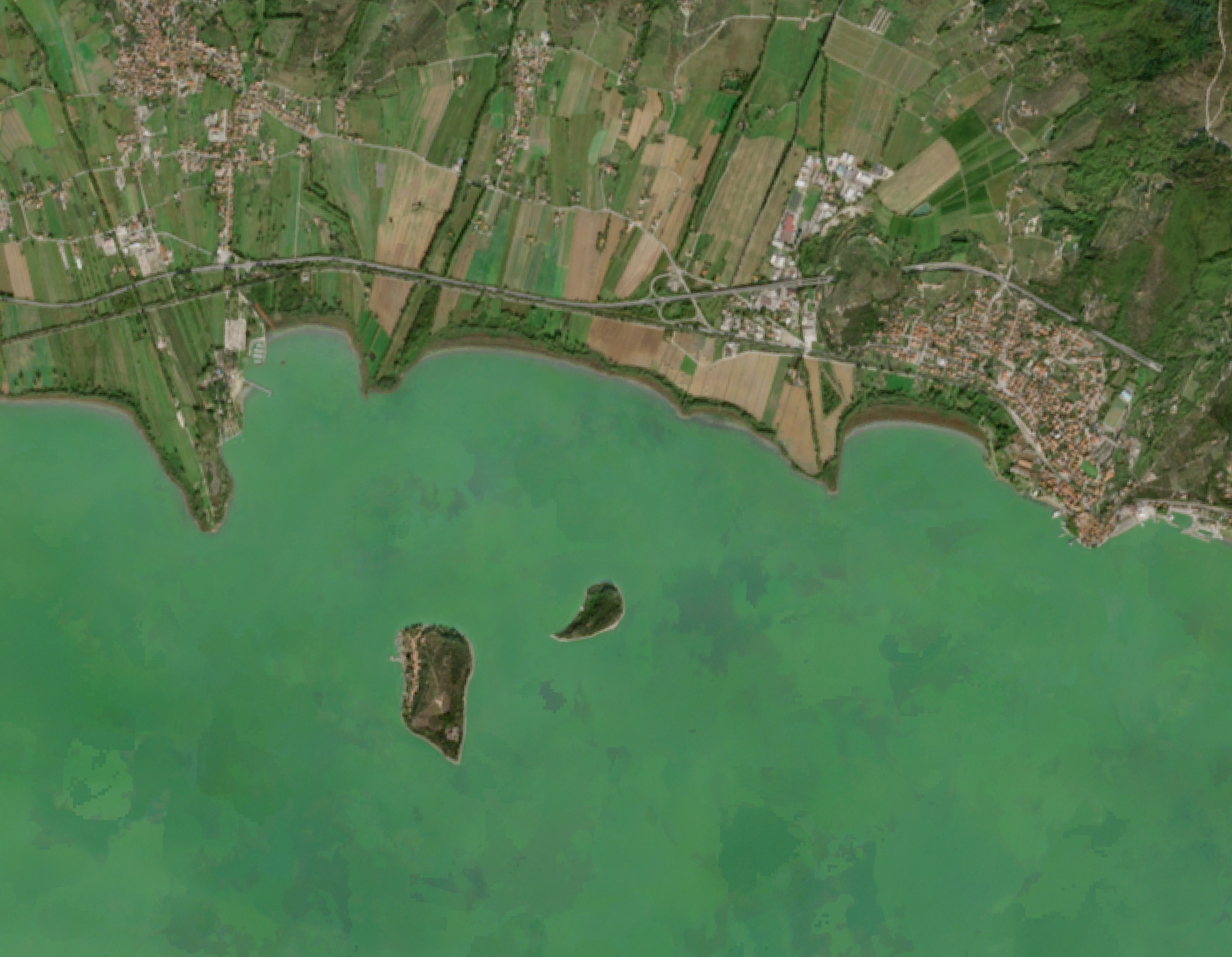
Satellite view of Isola Minore (smallest island) with Tuoro and Passignano on the northern shoreline

Isola Minore is largely covered by holm oak woodland and stone pine stands and is known for supporting a substantial colony of cormorants.

The island provides suitable habitat for several species of waterbirds, including the grey heron, cattle egret, little egret, squacco heron, and black-crowned night heron, which are documented as frequenting the island’s riparian woodland, holm oak groves, and pine stands. Large numbers of birds roost in the trees, whose branches and foliage appear whitened as a result of accumulated droppings.

Research published in 2024 estimates that Isola Minore hosts a wintering population of approximately 6,000 great cormorants, which migrate seasonally from the Baltic Sea and the North Sea. The same source notes that this migratory pattern appears to have altered in recent years, possibly in response to rising average temperatures.

Historical sources also record that Isola Minore was traditionally known as Isola dei Serpi (Island of Snakes), owing to the reported abundance of snakes on the island.

According to early 20th-century accounts, the island's terrain consisted of wooded areas and cultivated olive groves, which were noted at the time for producing high-quality olive oil.

== Religion ==
Archival records indicate that by the mid-14th century Isola Minore was home to a church dedicated to Saint Peregrine, listed among the territorial churches of Perugia. Another church, dedicated to Saint Peter, endowed with landed property, is recorded as existing on the island in 1593. This church was located at the end of the island, facing Isola Maggiore.

The island was traditionally associated with the cult of Saint Mustiola, whose image was still reported to survive in a ruined structure.
