= Guglielmi Castle =

Coordinates: 43.1733°N 12.0925°E

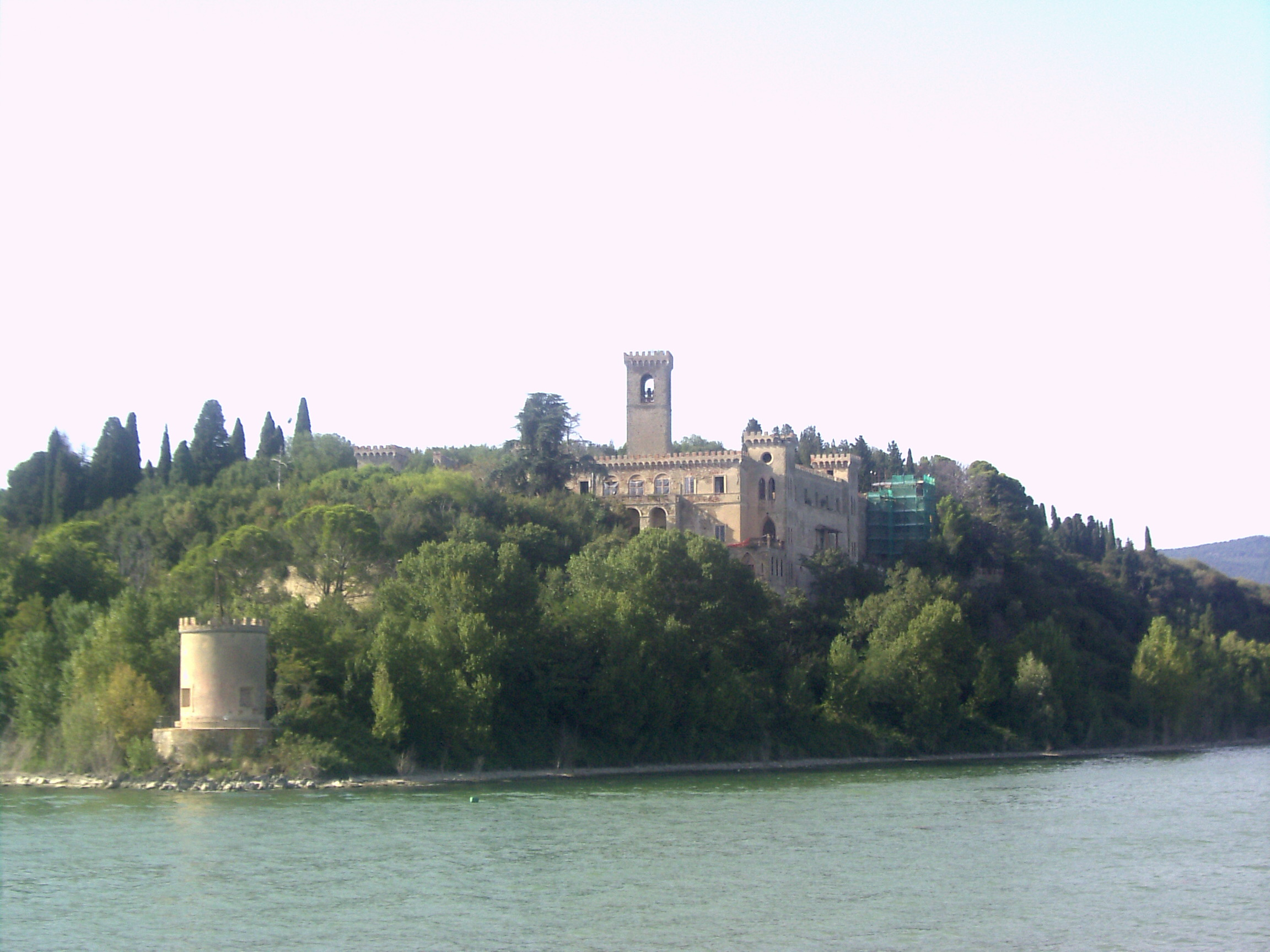
The Guglielmi Castle, still in ruins after the start of a restoration works

The Guglielmi Castle, or Isabella Castle, is located in the southern part of the Isola Maggiore, one of the three islands in Trasimeno Lake in the province of Perugia, Umbria, Italy.

== History ==
It was built as a summer residence, in 1887, by Senator Giacinto Guglielmi, Marquis of Vulci and Civitavecchia, in agreement with his wife Isabella, which was dedicated to the dwelling. In 1894 the Guglielmi organized a lavish inauguration: the building remained their property until 1975 and passed into new ownership in 1990. In 2010 the company which had purchased the complex and started the restoration declared bankruptcy. In 2014 the castle was offered at auction last time but this was not quorate. The asking price was 7.6 million.
