= Lisciano Niccone =

- Comune
- Comune di Lisciano Niccone
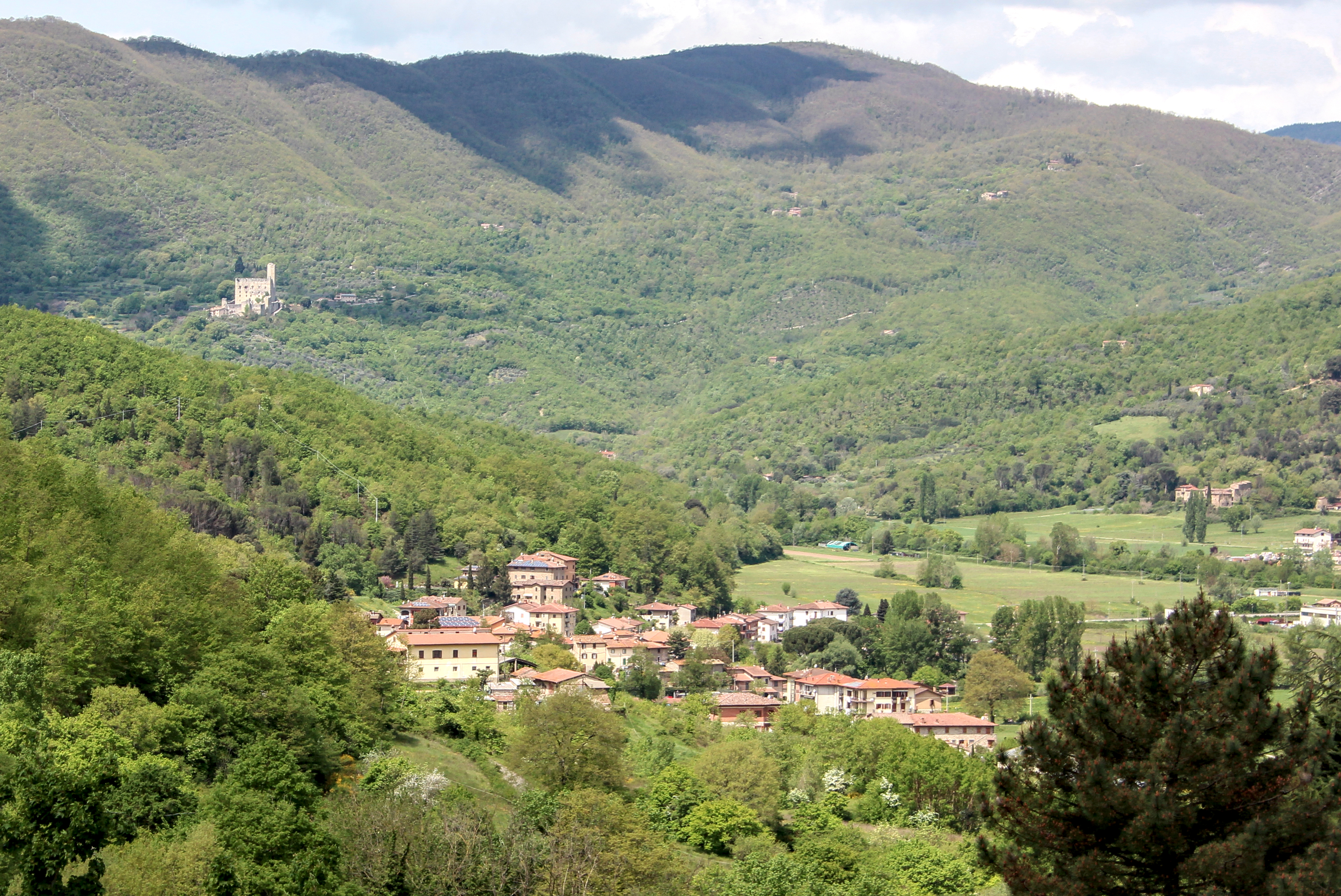

- Coat of arms

- Location within Italy Location within Umbria
- Coordinates: 43.246567°N 12.143273°E
- Country: Italy
- Region: Umbria
- Province: Perugia (PG)

Government
  - Mayor: Gianluca Moscioni

Area
  - Total: 35.4 km^{2} (13.7 sq mi)
- Elevation: 314 m (1,030 ft)

Population (1 January 2025)
  - Total: 596
  - Density: 16.8/km^{2} (43.6/sq mi)
- Demonym: Liscianesi
- Time zone: UTC+1 (CET)
  - Summer (DST): UTC+2 (CEST)
- Postal code: 06060
- Dialing code: 075
- Website: Official website

Lisciano Niccone is a municipality in the Province of Perugia in the Italian region Umbria, located about 25 km northwest of Perugia.

== Etymology ==
The origins of the name Lisciano Niccone are uncertain. A tradition, repeated by some earlier writers and echoed in 19th-century accounts, attributes its foundation to a certain Liciano, who is said to have owned estates in the area. This explanation is regarded as conjectural.

== History ==
In antiquity the area of Lisciano Niccone occupied a strategic position as a passage between the valleys of the Tiber and the Trasimeno and the Val di Chiana. Its importance is reflected in the presence of numerous fortified castles between the Niccone and Pierle valleys.

On 29 May 1202 the community formally submitted to Perugia. In the 13th century it formed part of the contado of Porta Sant'Angelo and was governed by a vicario appointed by the Perugian authorities. After the death of Uguccione de' Casali, lord of Cortona, the rocca of Lisciano came into the possession of the Comune of Perugia.

In 1313 Lisciano, together with nearby settlements, took part in the reconstruction of the walls of the castle of Fiume on the border of Perugian territory. In 1370 it joined the Rocca del Miccia in rebellion against Perugia; the settlement was occupied by Papal troops, and a subsequent peace agreement granted privileges over the community to the Oddi family.

In the early modern period Lisciano became part of the Papal States, remaining under Papal rule until the 19th century. A document dated 18 October 1818 records the local officeholders as the gonfaloniere Francesco Ferretti and the elders Paolo Cocchi and Pietro Paolo Ballerini.

The first documented reference dates to 1200, when the Perugians seized the castle from the people of Cortona, who had held it for some time.

In 1859 the municipality had a population of 1,814 inhabitants. Of these, only 28 lived within the castle, while 1,786 resided in scattered rural farmhouses.

== Geography ==
Lisciano Niccone stands on a hill about 8 kilometres (5.0 mi) from the shore of Lake Trasimeno and approximately 24 kilometres (15 mi) from Perugia. The built-up area is enclosed by medieval walls. The surrounding land is fertile and suited to the cultivation of wheat and maize, as well as vineyards, and also provides firewood.

Lisciano Niccone is situated on a hill among woods and chestnut groves. The climate was described in the mid-19th century as rather harsh, dominated by northern winds. The territory borders Tuscany in the direction of Val di Pierle. The surrounding landscape was said to be restricted in outlook overall, though more open toward the east.

Lisciano Niccone borders the following municipalities: Cortona, Passignano sul Trasimeno, Tuoro sul Trasimeno, Umbertide.

=== Subdivisions ===
The municipality includes the localities of Crocicchie, Gosparini, Lisciano Niccone, Pian di Marte.

In 2021, 244 people lived in rural dispersed dwellings not assigned to any named locality. At the time, the most populous locality was Lisciano Niccone proper (294).

== Economy ==
The local economy was predominantly agricultural in the mid-19th century. The area produced abundant grain, chestnuts, and other crops, despite some less fertile zones.

== Religion and culture ==
=== Church of San Nicolò ===
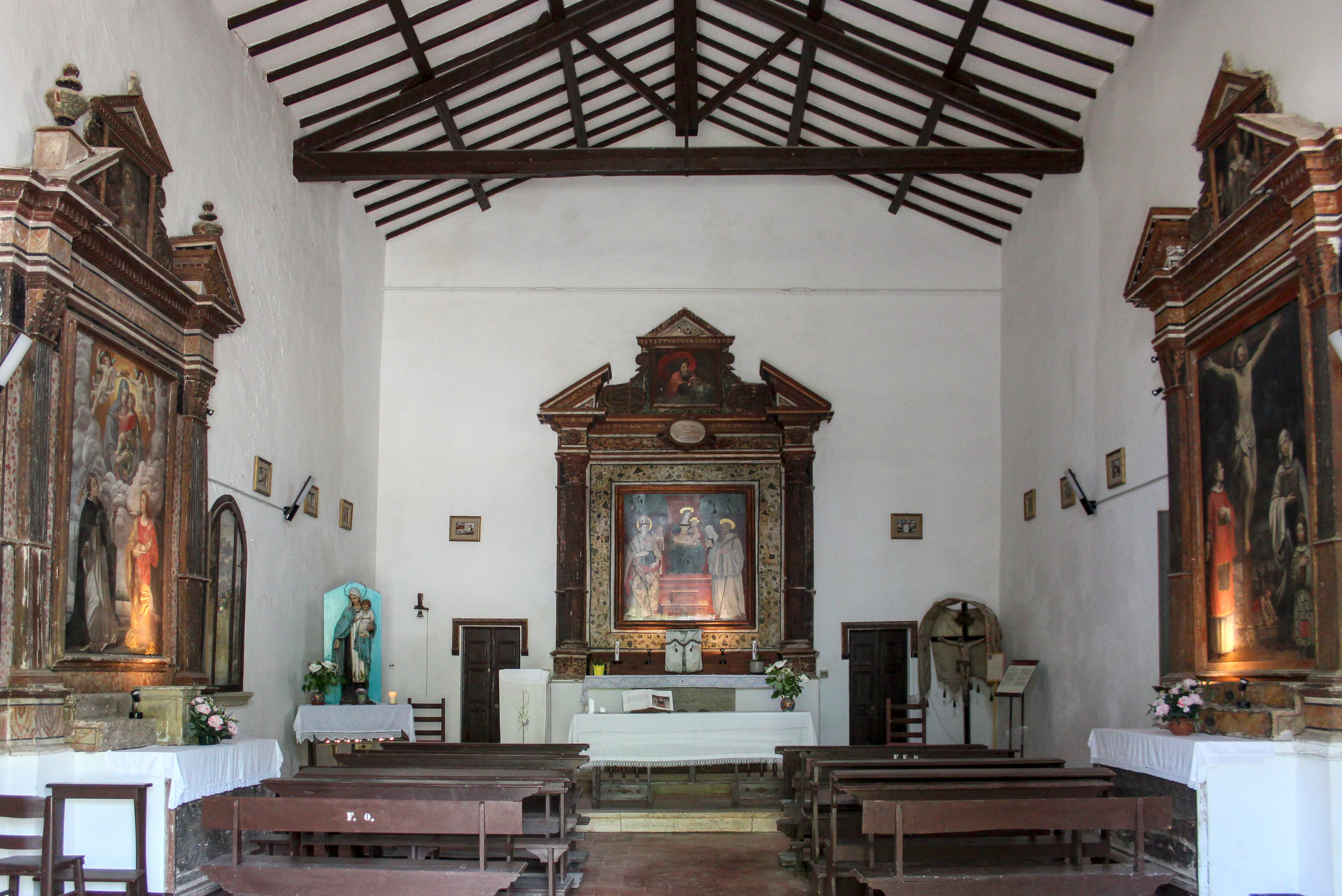
Church San Nicolò in Val di Rose

The church of San Nicolò in Val di Rose is located in the frazione of Crocicchie. Built with masonry walls that are plastered on the inside and left as exposed stone on the exterior, it has a rectangular plan. Two side entrances lead into the sacristy. Inside, the church preserves an altarpiece painted around 1515 by Eusebio da San Giorgio. The painting depicts the Madonna and Child enthroned, accompanied by Saint Nicholas of Bari, Saint Romuald, the Blessed Bucarello, and Saint Frances of Rome.

=== Castle of Lisciano Niccone ===
The Castle of Lisciano Niccone was built on the summit of the hill rising to the east of the town, around the 9th–10th century. Of the old fortress only a few ruins remain today, indicating the scale it once had. The historic castle has an oval shape and substantial defensive walls, part of which on the west were already partly ruined by the 19th century. Within the walls stood only eight houses and the parish church. About three-quarters of a mile from the castle, down in the plain, lies a locality known as Case Vecchie, where the municipal offices were located in the 19th century.

=== Other religious buildings ===
The principal church is dedicated to Saint Thomas and had three altars in the 19th century. Popular festivals were celebrated in honor of the Rosary and Saint Roch. The parish church was located within the castle walls.

In its territory are the remains of a castle (11th century) and a church from the same period, dedicated to St. Nicholas.
