= Tuoro sul Trasimeno =

- Comune
- Comune di Tuoro sul Trasimeno
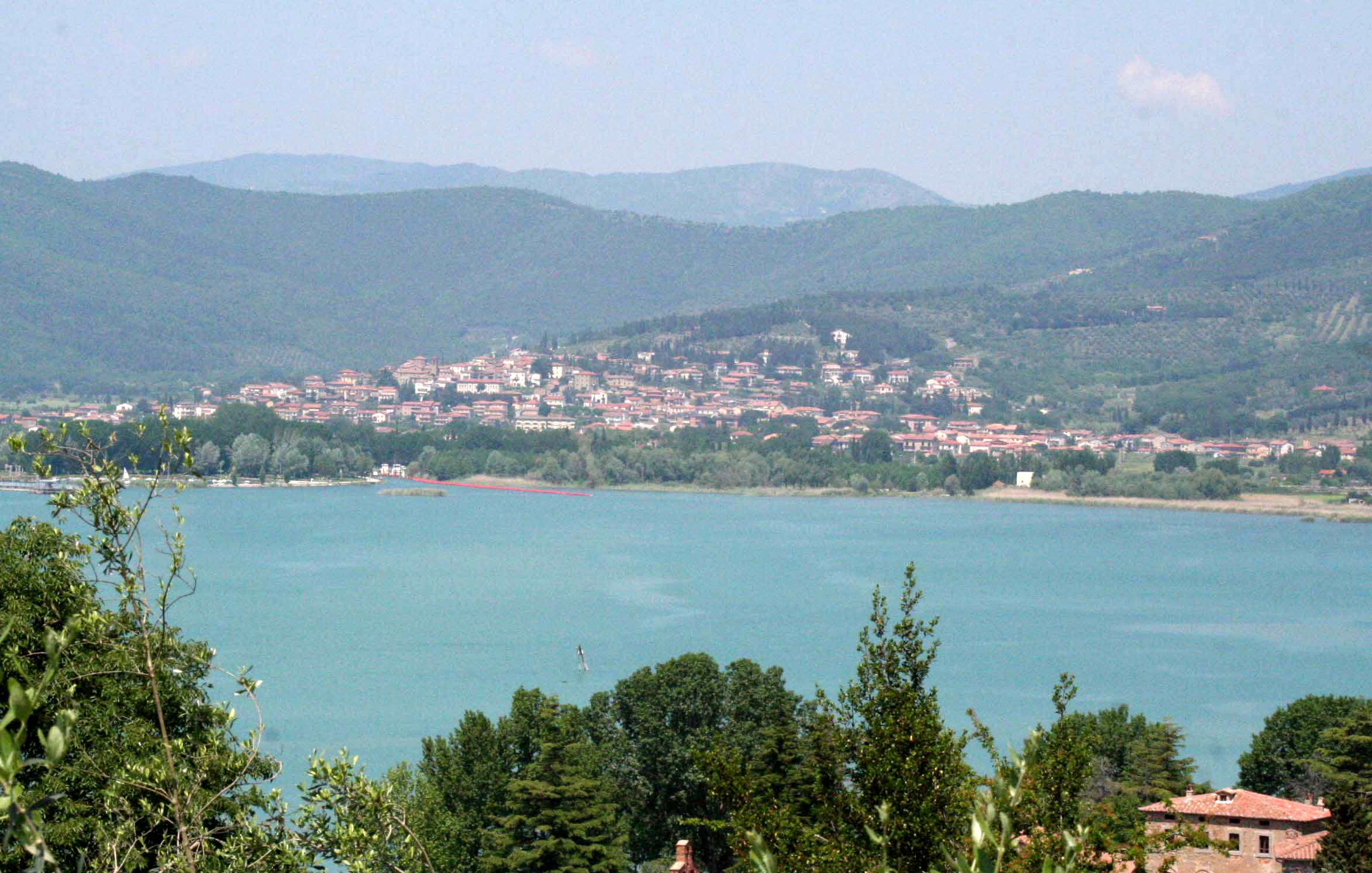
- View of Tuoro sul Trasimeno

- Coat of arms

- Location within Italy Location within Umbria
- Coordinates: 43.208779°N 12.071635°E
- Country: Italy
- Region: Umbria
- Province: Perugia (PG)

Government
  - Mayor: Patrizia Cerimonia

Area
  - Total: 55.6 km^{2} (21.5 sq mi)
- Elevation: 309 m (1,014 ft)

Population (1 January 2025)
  - Total: 3,779
  - Density: 68.0/km^{2} (176/sq mi)
- Demonym: Toreggiani
- Time zone: UTC+1 (CET)
  - Summer (DST): UTC+2 (CEST)
- Postal code: 06069
- Dialing code: 075
- Website: Official website

Tuoro sul Trasimeno is a comune (municipality) in the province of Perugia in the Italian region Umbria, located about 25 km northwest of Perugia.

== Etymology ==
According to Adone Palmieri, the name Tuoro was thought to derive from the Etruscan word Toro.

== History ==
A 19th-century account closely associates the territory of Tuoro with the Battle of Lake Trasimene in 217 BC, when Hannibal inflicted a major defeat on the Roman army.

The first mention of Tuoro dates to 1363, when it was occupied by Florentine nobles who were later besieged, captured, and executed by the Perugians. The parish church, already in existence in the 13th century, was destroyed in the following century.

At the time, Tuoro was ruled by the marquesses del Monte. Between the 14th and 17th centuries it was repeatedly affected by conflicts between Arezzo and Perugia, during which the town suffered damage.

In May 1363 it was seized by Perugian exiles, who carried out a violent assault on the inhabitants. Florentine troops occupied the town in 1479, and Spanish forces took possession of it in 1540. A further occupation by Florentine troops followed in 1643.

During the 16th century the town was incorporated into the Papal States. It functioned as a postal relay station and customs post and experienced a prolonged period of peace. A hospital operated by Franciscan friars provided care for sick travelers.

Administrative reorganization in the 19th century altered its status several times. In 1817 it formed a united municipality with Borghetto and Baroncino under Passignano, within the delegation of Perugia; the territory included Montegualandro, Sanguineto and Vernazzano. In 1833 it again became a united municipality with Magione, where the governor resided.

In the mid-19th century Tuoro had a population of 954 inhabitants, of whom 479 lived in the main settlement and 475 in the surrounding countryside.

The annexation of Umbria to the Kingdom of Italy in 1860 placed it within the Province of Perugia. In 1875 Isola Maggiore was transferred from Castiglione del Lago to its jurisdiction. The municipality adopted the name Tuoro sul Trasimeno in 1922.

== Geography ==
Tuoro stands in a scenic position along the northern shores of Lake Trasimeno. Its territory includes the area between the lake and Monte Gualandro, where the battlefield of the Battle of Lake Trasimene is said to be situated.

Tuoro lies about 4 miles (6.4 km) from Passignano, 2 miles (3.2 km) from the Tuscan border, 7 miles (11 km) from Cortona, and 20 miles (32 km) from Perugia. The town stands on a hill rich in olive groves, overlooking a broad landscape. The climate is described as mild, with prevailing north-east and west winds.

A stream known as the Macerone, also called the Sanguineto because during the Second Punic War its waters were said to have been stained with blood, flows at a distance of about 0.33 miles (0.53 km) from the town. At Baroncino there is a bridge over this stream.

Tuoro sul Trasimeno borders the following municipalities: Castiglione del Lago, Cortona, Lisciano Niccone, Magione, Passignano sul Trasimeno. It is located on the northern shore of the Lake Trasimeno.

=== Subdivisions ===
The municipality includes the localities of Borghetto, Castelonchio, Fonte Sant'Angelo, Isola Maggiore, La Cima, La Fonte, Macerone, Montecchio, Pieve Confini, Sanguineto, Torraccia, Tuoro sul Trasimeno, Vernazzano Basso.

In 2021, 667 people lived in rural dispersed dwellings not assigned to any named locality. At the time, the most populous locality was Tuoro proper (2,223).

== Economy ==
In the late 19th century stockbreeding and sericulture were practiced in the area, alongside agricultural production. The territory was abundant in olive oil, wine, and other agricultural produce sufficient to sustain the population.

== Religion and culture ==
=== Religious buildings ===
Santa Maria Maddalena is the titular church of the principal parish, and its feast is celebrated on 22 July. The church is noted as having an organ.

=== Palazzo del Capra ===
The Palazzo del Capra, also known as Palazzo di Nardo, acquired its present form in the late 15th and early 16th centuries. According to tradition, it incorporates elements of ancient Roman structures, including a mausoleum dedicated to the consul Gaius Flaminius and remnants of a temple and an ustrinum. Its interior features a fresco by Pietro Perugino.

The palace was the final residence of Teodorico Moretti Costanzi, a philosopher and professor at the University of Bologna. It currently houses the permanent Centro di documentazione della Battaglia del Trasimeno e Annibale, preserving and presenting the historical legacy of the Battle of Trasimeno, which took place in the valley near Tuoro.

=== Archaeological heritage ===
The bronze statue known as The Orator was originally found south of Sanguineto and transported to Florence, where it is preserved at the Museo Archeologico. It depicts an Etruscan prince addressing a crowd while wearing the toga praetexta typical of magistrates and senators.

A Roman column was donated by the mayor of Rome to Tuoro during the 1961 Annibalic Studies Conference. It was installed in 1965 along the Via del Porto, marking the historically reconstructed shoreline of Lake Trasimeno at the time of the battle.

=== Other cultural heritage ===
Campo del Sole is an open-air sculpture installation in the form of a spiral of 27 sandstone columns, created by Pietro Cascella.

== Notable people ==
Tuoro was the birthplace of Anton Maria Garbi, a painter of the 18th century.

Among the principal families recorded in the 19th century were the Vecchi, Boattini, Costanzi, Centamori, and Maneschi.

== See also ==
- Guglielmi Castle
- Isola Maggiore
