= Izola (disambiguation) =

Izola may refer to:

- Izola, town in southwestern Slovenia on the Adriatic coast of the Istrian peninsula
- Izola (appliances), historic brand names in Greek industrial history
- Municipality of Izola, municipality in the traditional region of the Littoral in southwestern Slovenia.
- MNK Izola, Slovenian football club from Izola which competes in the Slovenian Third League
- NK Izola, Slovenian football club from Izola

== See also ==
- Isola (disambiguation)
