= Boldrino da Panicale =

Boldrino Paneri (also known as Boldrino da Panicale) was a 14th-century condottiero from Panicale, active in conflicts in central Italy. He served under John Hawkwood and later held command roles connected with the papal military in the Marche from 1381 onward.

His activities involved operations in Tuscany, Umbria, and the Marche, including campaigns affecting Perugia, Siena, and several towns of the Picenum area.

== Origin and early service ==
Boldrino Paneri was born in Panicale to Ambrogio Paneri and Cleopatra Ceppotti. As a young man living in Perugia, he trained with weapons in mock combats and held the aim of avenging the killing of his father. He became a leader of multiple exiles and others accustomed to vendettas and robbery.

Boldrino entered the forces of John Hawkwood while Hawkwood was in the pay of the Republic of Pisa. During the war between Pisa and Florence in the 1360s, Boldrino served under Hawkwood and moved through cities and districts with him, carrying out destructive operations in provinces subject in some way to Florence and drawing near to Florence itself.

In the course of these events, Florence used money and negotiations to induce defections among enemy companies. Hanneken von Baumgarten left Pisa with cavalry and infantry, carrying money, and withdrew from Tuscany. Boldrino, aware of such dealings, deserted the Pisan camp and sold his service to the Florentine government. A battle followed in which the Florentine army defeated and dispersed the Pisan forces; there were many dead and prisoners, and Hawkwood escaped in flight.

== Command in the Marche ==
After peace between Pisa and Florence, Boldrino's later movements were not preserved in the same detail. A separate account states that he served under a captain of fortune and distinguished himself in an assault on a castle in the Marche by holding his position when others were repelled, opening a way with weapons for his companions. He was made a man-at-arms and later became commander of a company of adventurers.

More continuous narration begins from 1381, when the Roman Curia, engaged in reasserting control over cities of the Picenum, appointed Boldrino to command papal forces. The political situation in the Marche involved shifting local governments and armed conflict among cities, lords, and mercenary companies. In this setting, Boldrino operated in the Marche, Umbria, and Tuscany with raids, killings, and retaliations.

== Operations around Perugia (1383–1384) ==
In 1383 Perugia sent ambassadors to Boldrino seeking agreements intended to limit the disruption caused by his soldiers. He continued his operations without adhering to such proposals. After taking booty in territories associated with Siena, Cortona, and Montepulciano, Boldrino halted in Chiusi (in the Perugian sphere) for his company to rest, imposing costs and damage on the countryside. Perugia considered hiring him but he continued to fight where he judged profit greatest and refused to return booty taken.

In the context of Perugian exiles and internal tensions, Michelozzo Michelotti left Perugia after a revealed political negotiation; he retained control of Castelnuovo and promised through intermediaries to return Vernazzano, but then sought armed support. Michelotti called on Bartolomeo da Pietramala and Boldrino da Panicale to support his plans.

Boldrino first struck Chiusi. With combined forces that did not exceed roughly 600 cavalry between him and Pietramala, they raided the fertile fields around Chiusi and then moved into Michelotti's stronghold. Boldrino then turned toward plundering islands and castles around Lake Trasimeno. The Isola Maggiore was attacked by boat-borne troops and suffered plunder; Isola Polvese also suffered an attack. Castles around the lake resisted due to position and walls, and were then subjected to harsh treatment.

In February 1384 Boldrino, alongside Bartolomeo da Pietramala, approached Perugia's surroundings at Michelotti's urging. They destroyed Ponte San Giovanni and Ponte Valleceppi and damaged the nearby hills.

Amid threats involving multiple forces, efforts were made to persuade Boldrino to defend Perugia. This task was given to Cardinal Andrea Bontempi and Count Antonio of Urbino, and Boldrino's service was secured. Before Perugia was freed from its enemies, he turned his attention elsewhere.

== Captain general in Siena (1384–1385) ==
War and internal conflict intensified in the Sienese territory. After a defeat suffered by Siena's captain on 12 June 1384, the ruling group in Siena hired Boldrino with 150 lances at a rate of 18 florins per lance, and an additional monthly payment for him. He entered Siena on 7 July, was acclaimed captain general, and on 12 July arrayed his armed company.

In Siena, Boldrino accepted money from the noble party while remaining in the city with forces that did not bring decisive protection to the ruling group. On 12 March 1385 Siena's rulers elected him captain of the war. He spoke to them urging agreement and warning that he would act if nobles persisted in destabilizing the city, but then withdrew from Siena, dispersed troops in the countryside, and carried out plundering. A prolonged struggle followed; the party of the Nove and Dodici rose, and many artisans fled Siena into the countryside and dispersed into various parts of Italy. Boldrino emerged with booty and returned toward the Perugian area.

== Siena and Perugia (1384–1386) ==
During early 1385 Perugia sought to secure Boldrino's withdrawal by sending ambassadors, including Contucciolo di Nicolò, Petruccio Monte-Sperelli, and Bartolomeo Guidalotti. Boldrino demanded a gift of 500 gold florins in exchange for ceasing support to Perugia's enemies and leaving Perugian subject lands. Perugia agreed.

Before mid-1385, Boldrino allied with foreign soldiers and resumed raiding the Perugian territory. Biordo degli Oddi urged him to prevent further destruction of the spring countryside and offered an additional 500 gold florins as provision up to June.

Assisi suffered raids by Boldrino's troops, with seizure of livestock and peasants, and release conditioned on humiliations.

In August 1385 Perugia received warning of an approaching company of 800 cavalry under Beltotto Inglese (John Beltoft), joined by Boldrino and Taddeo Pepoli, who commanded nearly 2,000 cavalry. Perugia ordered rural inhabitants to shelter harvests and livestock within castles and strengthen fortifications. It also ordered payment of 2,000 gold florins to those captains for withdrawal. They accepted money and returned again in September to exact levies and damage localities including Cerqueto, Papiano, and La Spina.

During these events Boldrino became seriously ill and was unable to lead continuous raiding. He asked Perugia for safe shelter and means to recover, promising benevolence and restraint by his men. Perugia received him into the city on 13 August 1385, gave him gifts, and honored him. In August 1386 Perugia decreed that each year he should be given 500 gold florins.

== Conflicts in the Marche and Umbria (1385–1388) ==
Urban VI confirmed Boldrino's command of papal forces so that the Picenum area would follow the example of Fermo, Ancona, and Recanati, which were under the Roman court. The people of Ascoli Piceno resisted and withstood Boldrino's pressure. His troops, impatient for booty and not accustomed to prolonged sieges, withdrew and appeared at the gates of Fermo on 2 December 1385. The sudden arrival alarmed the city; nobles feared loss of freedom, and the populace took up arms and demanded control of the city keys. Boldrino's 500 cavalry, heavily laden with booty, soon returned toward Ascoli. The civic resistance at Ascoli strengthened, preventing Boldrino and his men from destroying the city.

On 20 December 1385 Boldrino returned toward Fermo. The government of Fermo hired Grasso da Imola and Nello da Camerino with 400 cavalry for two months. Several clashes occurred without decisive defeat for either side. Boldrino then withdrew from the territory of Fermo and moved through other cities and castles of the Marche, later reaching Recanati.

In October 1386, while at Recanati, Boldrino was invited by Perugia to bring arms for the city's protection. An ambassador, Giovanni Scotti, urged him to assist against threats involving Bretons occupying holdings in Umbria in the name of Antipope Clement, the Michelotti's continued pressure on patricians, and Hawkwood's approach through plundering. Boldrino promised rapid assistance and came with cavalry and infantry. He acted in Perugia's favor and routed the hardened company of the English captain. He was then greeted by the Priors as a citizen of Perugia. He soon returned to the Picenum.

In February 1387 Andrea da Montegranaro seized several places in the territory of Fermo and established himself at Civitanova. Lucio Sparviero, leading forces paid by the Varano lords of Camerino, drove him out and restored the place to Varano control. Civitanova then passed quickly to the authority of Grasso da Imola and Nello da Camerino, who were in the pay of Fermo. Nello da Camerino then killed Grasso da Imola and called Boldrino to participate in the killing. Civitanova became subject to Nello and Boldrino.

Boldrino returned to his native area after further activity in the territory of Fermo in October 1387. In November 1387 notable events occurred in Umbria. Cardinal Tommaso Orsini of Manoppello, governing in Viterbo, acted to retain control of the city and led citizens to refuse the new legate appointed by Urban VI. Orsini was summoned to Rome and became a prisoner in or near Perugia. Nicola Orsini responded by taking Terni and Narni from the Church.

Perugia sent Onofrio Bartolini to Narni and hired Boldrino for four months with 200 lances. The embassy did not achieve peace. Urban VI besieged Narni and took it, while Nicola Orsini held the fortress until Perugia urged the pope to free the Cardinal of Manoppello. Boldrino's 200 lances protected Perugian countryside from new mercenary forces but did not remove the Bretons from occupied strongholds. At the end of December Bernard de la Salle still held Cannara; in the following year Corrado Tedesco recovered Cannara and received 500 gold florins per year and Perugian citizenship (November 1388).

== Later activity and death (1388–1391) ==
After the easing of conflict in Umbria, Boldrino reappeared in the Picenum. Shortly after arriving, he nearly took Massignano from Ancona after its inhabitants revolted on 15 January 1388. He then moved again against the territory of Fermo on 10 April 1388, taking prisoners and livestock and retreating to Montegranaro or San Giusto. Hostilities ended after Marco Zeno, possibly captain of Fermo, sought to force Boldrino from his position.

In the wider Marche, Cardinal Andrea Bontempi worked to restore calm. Boldrino did not act as a faithful executor of the cardinal's plans and used his authority for advantage against both friends and enemies of the Church. Boniface IX, succeeding Urban VI, drew Ancona to his side and sent Andrea Tomacelli to pacify the province. Conflict developed between Boldrino and Tomacelli, connected with Boldrino's actions in stirring opposition to the Church's settlement efforts.

Macerata, Osimo, and Recanati were governed as communes and rejected peace proposals from Tomacelli; they appealed to other cities to resist. A truce was eventually established among the parties, and Boldrino also made peace with Ancona. The year 1391 followed these developments.

On 3 June 1391 Andrea Tomacelli invited Boldrino Paneri to a banquet in Macerata. Boldrino left his troops at Castelficano and went to the banquet. Tomacelli's men surrounded him and killed him, and his head was severed.

After the killing, news reached Boldrino's homeland. His soldiers attacked the people of Macerata and carried out killings and sought Tomacelli and the body of Boldrino. Women of Macerata later brought Boldrino's remains to the enraged troops, who carried the body and carried out further vengeance in the Marche.

== Related people ==
- Muzio Attendolo Sforza began military service in 1381 under Boldrino.
