= Isola Maggiore =

- Frazione
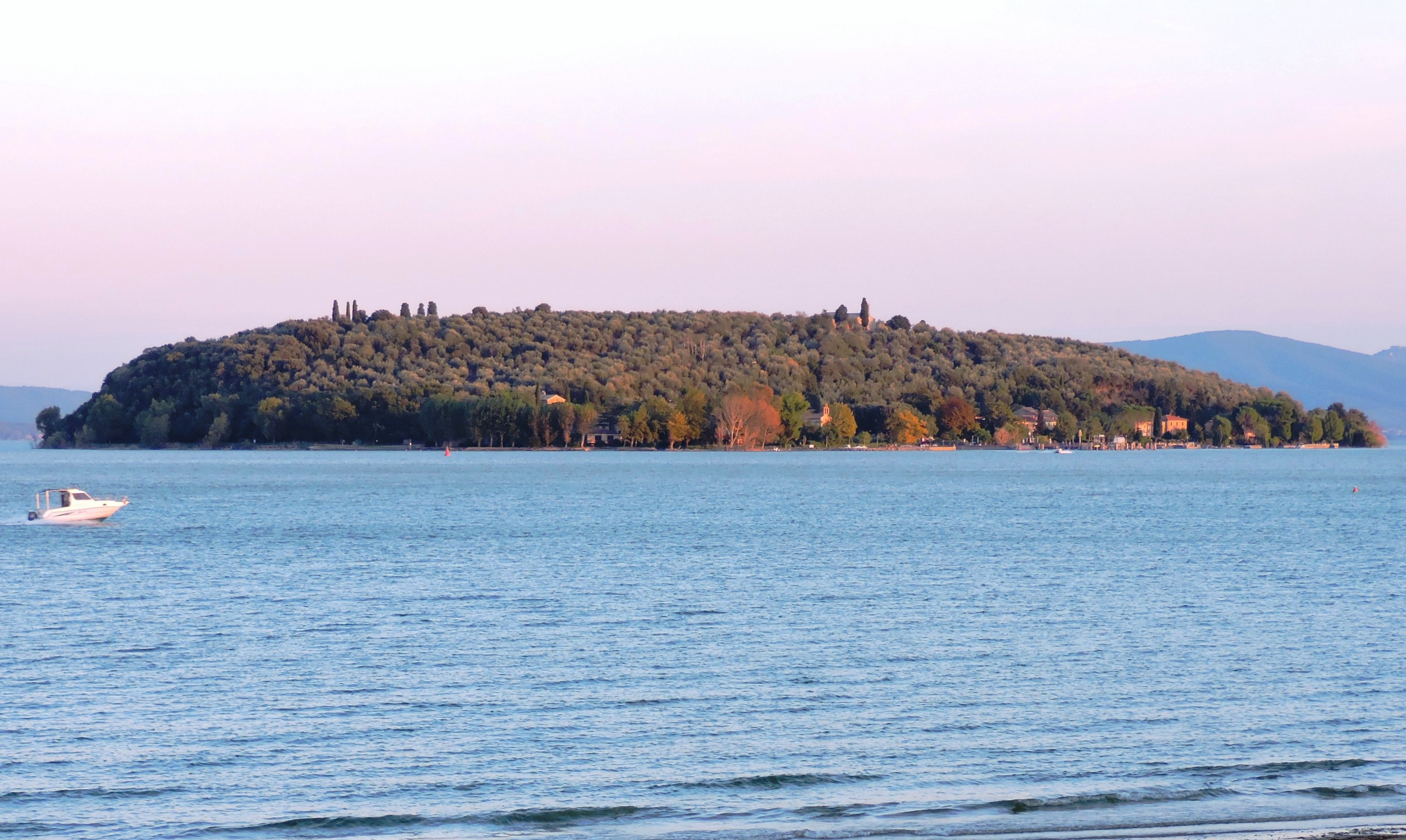
- Isola Maggiore

- Location of Isola Maggiore in Italy
- Coordinates: 43°11′N 12°06′E
- Country: Italy
- Region: Umbria
- Province: Perugia
- Comune: Tuoro sul Trasimeno

Area
  - Total: 0.24 km^{2} (0.093 sq mi)
- Elevation: 309 m (1,014 ft)

Population (2021)
  - Total: 23
  - Density: 96/km^{2} (250/sq mi)
- Time zone: UTC+1 (CET)
  - Summer (DST): UTC+2 (CEST)
- Dialing code: 075

Isola Maggiore is an island in Lake Trasimeno in Umbria, central Italy. It belongs to the municipality of Tuoro sul Trasimeno and is the second-largest island in the lake, with a surface area of about 24 hectares (59 acres).

Unlike Isola Polvese and Isola Minore, the island is still inhabited, with a small village located on its western shore. According to the 2021 census, the island had a resident population of 23. (Note: Population data from the 2021 census: Municipality code 54055 – Tuoro sul Trasimeno, census section 10004 (Isola Maggiore): population 23.) (Note: To obtain the data from the website: 1. Select "Basi Territoriali 2021: Confini amministrativi, Località, Sezioni di censimento, Aree SubCom".; 2. Use the search function to find the desired place.; 3. Click the Attribute Table icon in the top-right corner.; 4. In the panel that appears at the bottom of the page, select "Località 2021".)

In 19th-century sources, Isola Maggiore is also referred to as Naviggiano.

== History ==
=== Antiquity to medieval period ===
Isola Maggiore shows evidence of human presence dating back to the Etruscan period.

Traditionally, the island was under the dominion of Cortona. In 1278, its inhabitants swore loyalty to Ermanno di Sassoferrato, Captain of the People of Perugia. From the late 13th century, a community of Friars Minor was present on the island.

In the 1300s locals reportedly lived in conditions of severe poverty, exacerbated by seasonal malaria and a heavy dependence on fishing. An early attempt to address these conditions led to the establishment of a hospital, funded by bequests from wealthier islanders who owned land on the mainland.

In 1383, Isola Maggiore was attacked by the forces led by Boldrino da Panicale, during which the island was subjected to plundering and violence, and its inhabitants experienced significant destruction.

In 1416, during the final phase of Braccio da Montone's campaigns in central Italy, Isola Maggiore submitted to his authority. Following the collapse of organized Perugian resistance and Braccio da Montone's consolidation of control in the region, the island dispatched a small delegation to his camp to swear obedience.

In 1444, James of the Marches stayed for three days at the convent of San Francesco on Isola Maggiore, accompanied by John of Capistrano and Bernardino of Siena, while traveling through central Italy. In 1459, during his departure from Perugia, Pope Pius II stayed overnight on Isola Maggiore at the convent of the Friars Minor while crossing Lake Trasimeno on his journey toward Siena.

In 1495, Isola Maggiore was occupied by Perugian exiles.

=== Early modern period ===
In 1531 and again in 1544, the confraternity with its hospital on Isola Maggiore was approved and authorized to administer its revenues by papal bulls.

In 1644, Isola Maggiore was taken by the forces of Ferdinand, Grand Duke of Tuscany.

=== Modern period ===
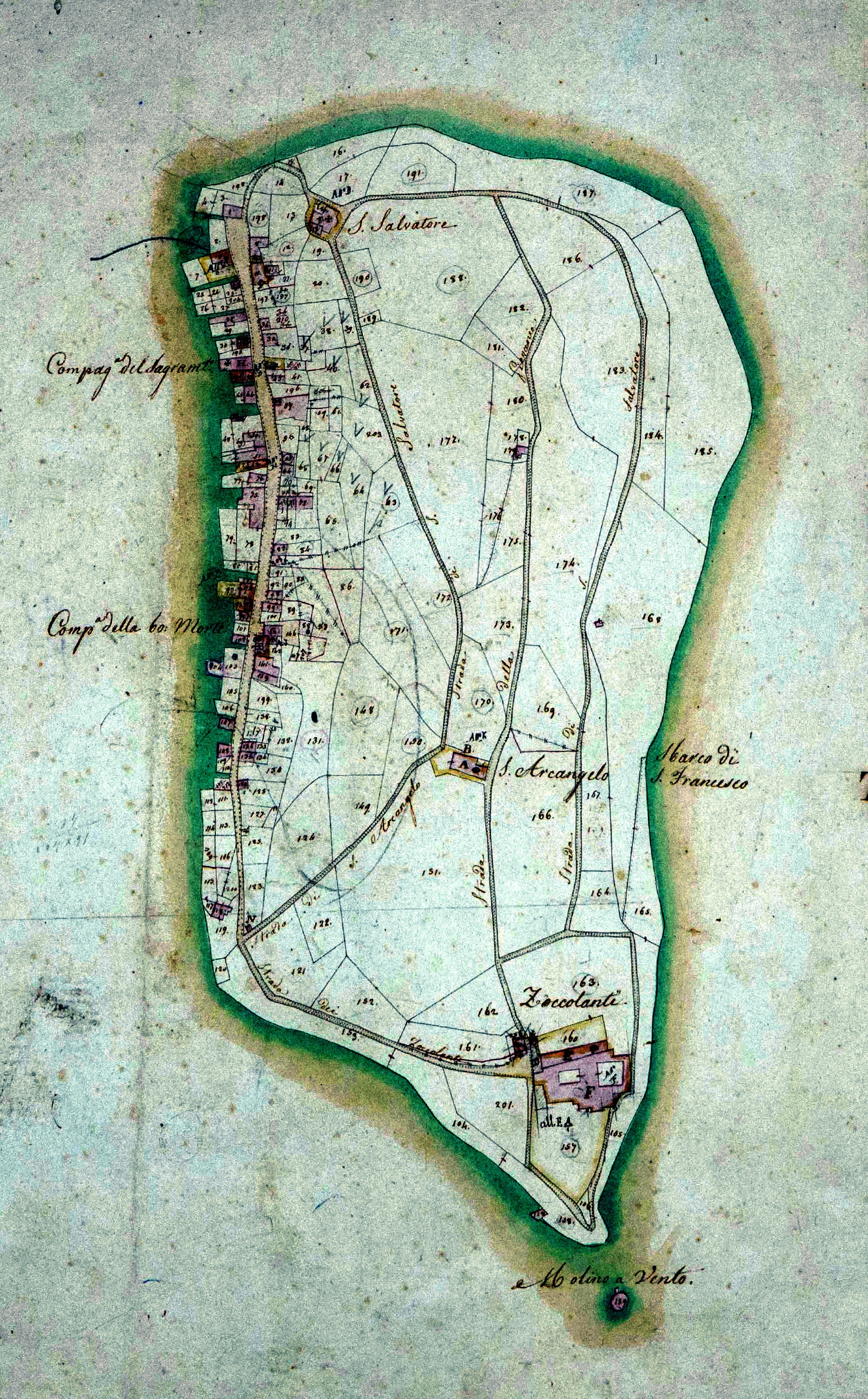
Cadastral map of the island, 1820s

In 1836, the island was recorded as a frazione of Castiglione del Lago and was subject to the government of that locality, within the district, delegation, and diocese of Perugia. The island was reported to have a population of 196.

In 1859, the island was reported as one of the places where political placards were affixed in support of the incorporation of central Italy under the Savoy monarchy during contemporary political demonstrations.

In 1880, Isola Maggiore was a frazione with a population of 216 inhabitants. It was administratively separated from the municipality of Castiglione del Lago and associated with the municipality of Tuoro.

From 1887, the Marquis Giacinto Guglielmi played a significant role in the island, notably through the construction of a residence on the site of a former convent and the establishment of a school for women's work.

During World War II, Isola Maggiore was used by German forces to hold Jewish internees in a castle on the island. On the night of 19–20 June 1944, the internees were transported by local fishermen across Lake Trasimeno to an area under Allied control.

== Demographics ==
Historical population
Year	Pop.	±% p.a.
1656	255	—
1701	148	−1.20%
1736	156	+0.15%
1836	196	+0.23%
1853	173	−0.73%
1871	216	+1.24%
1881	177	−1.97%
1901	201	+0.64%
1911	203	+0.10%
1921	186	−0.87%
1931	204	+0.93%
1951	204	+0.00%
1961	151	−2.96%
1971	122	−2.11%
1981	84	−3.66%
1991	63	−2.84%
2001	35	−5.71%
2021	23	−2.08%

Population data indicate a marked decline between the mid-17th and early 18th centuries, with the number of inhabitants falling from 255 in 1656 to 148 in 1701, as recorded in papal censuses. Subsequent counts show a slow recovery during the 18th and early 19th centuries, reaching 173 inhabitants by 1853.

Following Italian unification, census data record modest growth between the late-19th and early 20th centuries, with the population rising from 177 in 1881 to just over 200 by 1911 and remaining broadly stable through 1951.

From the second half of the 20th century onward, the population entered a prolonged decline. Census figures show a sharp decrease from 204 inhabitants in 1951 to 122 in 1971, followed by continued depopulation in subsequent decades, reaching 23 residents by 2021.

== Geography ==
Isola Maggiore is one of the three islands emerging from Lake Trasimeno, located in the northern part of the lake.

The island is part of the municipality of Tuoro sul Trasimeno and measures approximately 800 metres (2,600 ft) in length, with a circumference of nearly 2 kilometres (1.2 mi).

=== Climate ===
Isola Maggiore experiences an average annual rainfall of around 600 millimetres (24 in). Precipitation is generally lowest during the summer months and highest during the winter months, with late summer being the driest period and late autumn to early winter the wettest.

Isola Maggiore is the second largest island on Lake Trasimeno and is covered by dense vegetation, including olive trees, holm oaks, and cypresses.

== Economic activities ==
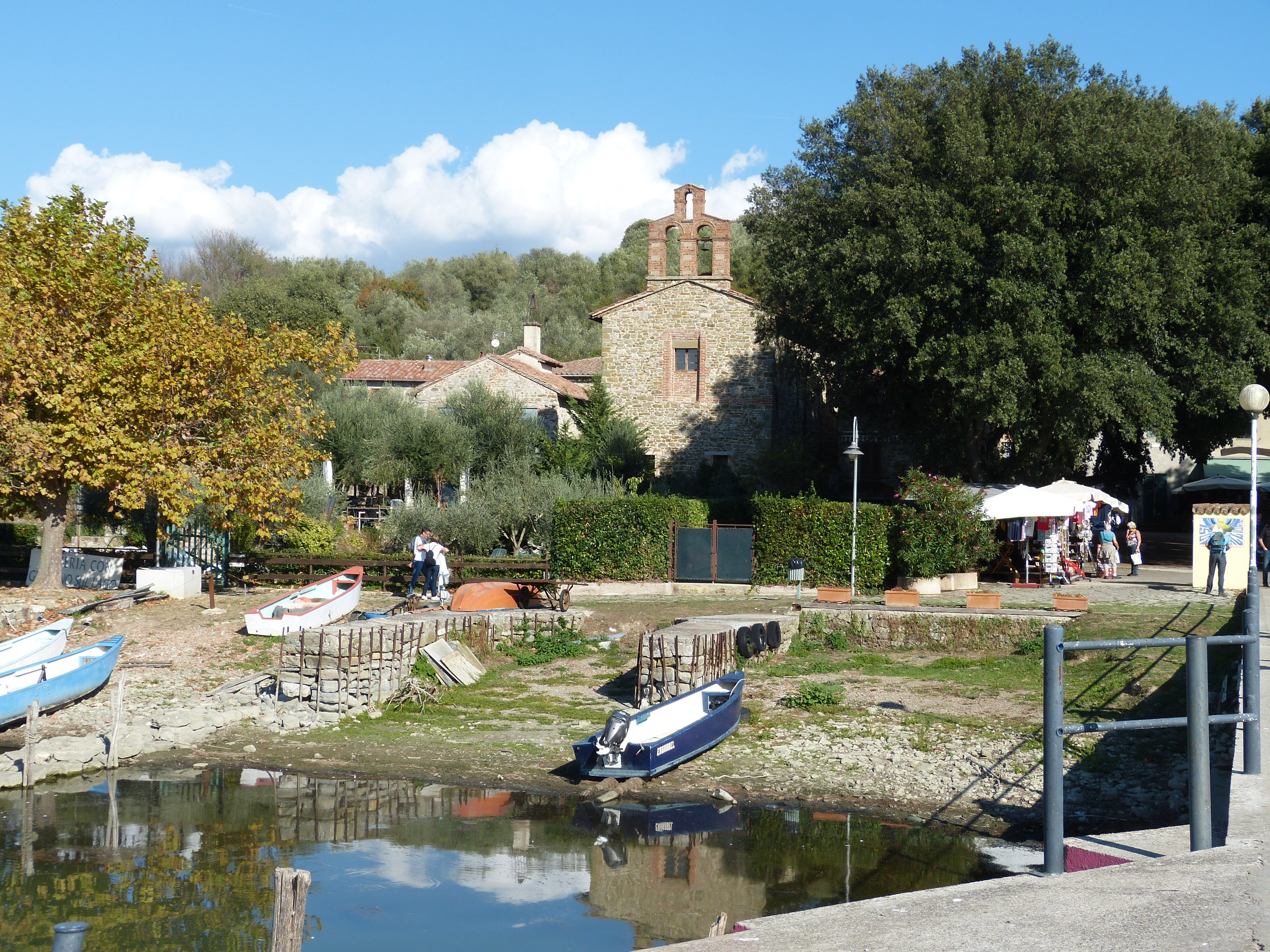
The harbor of Isola Maggiore, with boats drawn up along the shore

In the second half of the 16th century, the economy of Isola Maggiore was primarily based on agriculture and fishing, and the island contained eight religious buildings and five confraternities.

Until the early 17th century, Isola Maggiore was the principal fishing center of Lake Trasimeno. In that period, the island community was required to construct and annually maintain a port, as determined by the authority governing the lake. These ports were required to be suitable for the handling and loading of fish, and fishing activity was restricted to these authorized ports.

== Culture ==
=== Religious buildings and artworks ===
Isola Maggiore features a number of historical religious structures, including the Church of San Salvatore, the ruins of the church and monastery of the Sisters of San Leonardo, the Church of San Michele Arcangelo, and the Church of San Francesco.

According to the Little Flowers of St. Francis, the island was associated with an episode involving Francis of Assisi, who in February 1211 was said to have landed there during Lent and remained for forty-two days in prayer. A chapel marked the point where he landed, and another chapel marked the site where he was said to have built a hut.

==== Church of San Michele Arcangelo ====
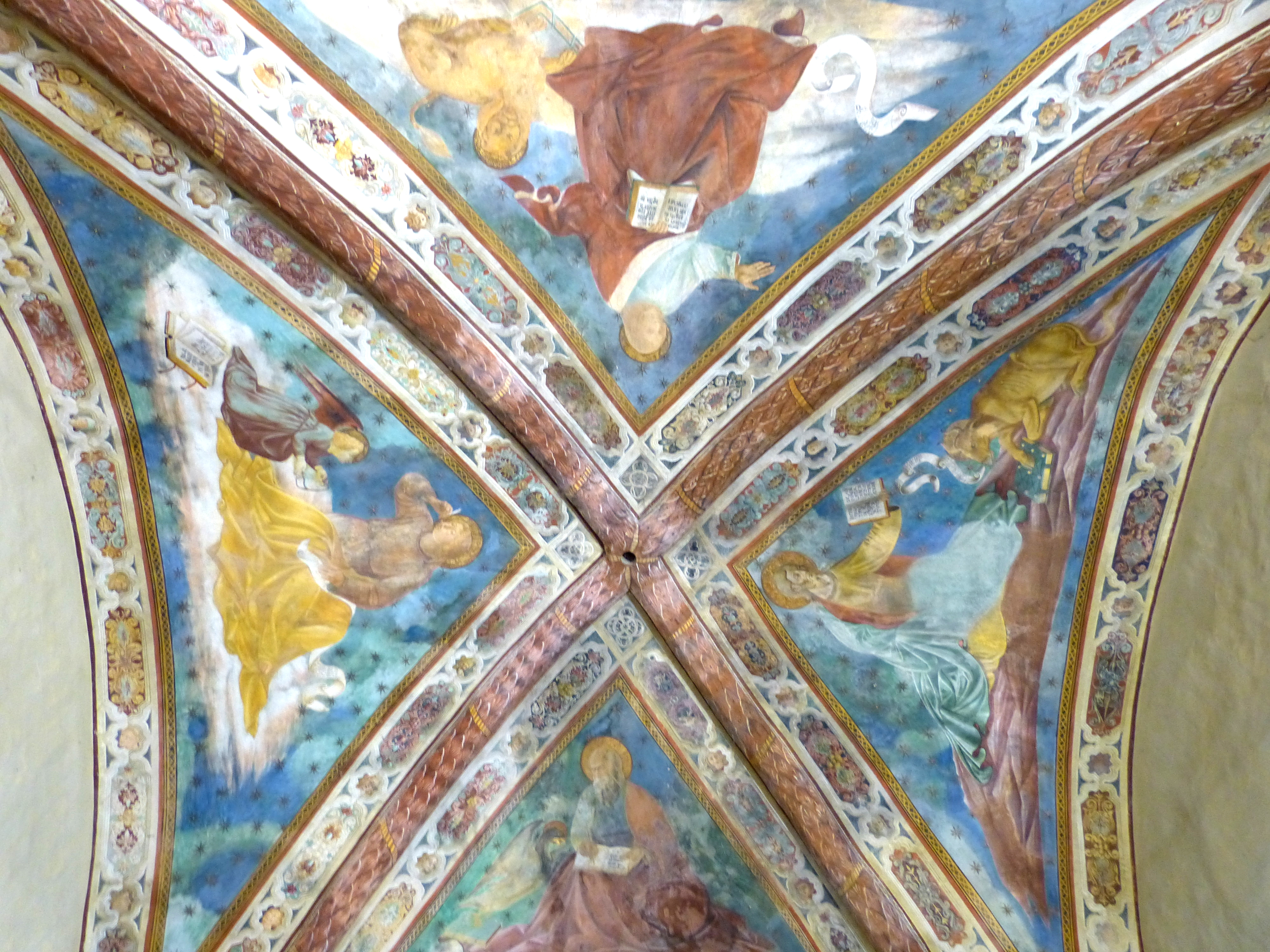
Frescoed apse inside the Church of San Michele Arcangelo

The church of San Michele Arcangelo preserves painted religious decoration attributed to artists connected with the Foligno and Perugian schools. The apse was frescoed by an unnamed artist influenced by Benozzo Gozzoli, and although much of the original decoration has been lost, several fragments remain, including depictions of Christ and the Apostles, the Evangelists, various saints, and a seated Virgin and Child. One fresco bears the date 1506.

Within the church, a tempera panel in the form of a shaped cross depicting the Crucifixion with additional figures has been attributed to Benozzo Gozzoli. A fragmentary Crocifissione, preserved in a chapel later incorporated into the base of the bell tower, is attributed to Niccolò Alunno. The church also contained a stone holy oil repository inscribed with the year 1533.

A shaped Crucifixion panel associated with the church was later sent by the municipality of Tuoro sul Trasimeno to a public exhibition. At the time, it was reported to be in a deteriorated condition due to damage caused by woodworm. In addition to the frescoes, the church houses a crucifix possibly attributable to Bartolomeo Caporali, with decorative phases spanning from the 13th to the 16th centuries.

==== Other churches ====
The Church of San Francesco was consecrated in 1543 by Alessandro, bishop of Città di Castello. Its interior includes an oil painting of the Annunciation dated 1575 and bearing the name of the patron, a tempera panel with a gilded background depicting Mary with the Christ Child and four angels attributed to the Sienese school of the 15th century, and a white marble holy water balustrade carved in the 16th century.

At the end of the village stands the Church of St. Salvatore, which houses parts of a polyptych by Sano di Pietro formerly located in the church of the Franciscan monastery.

=== Architecture ===
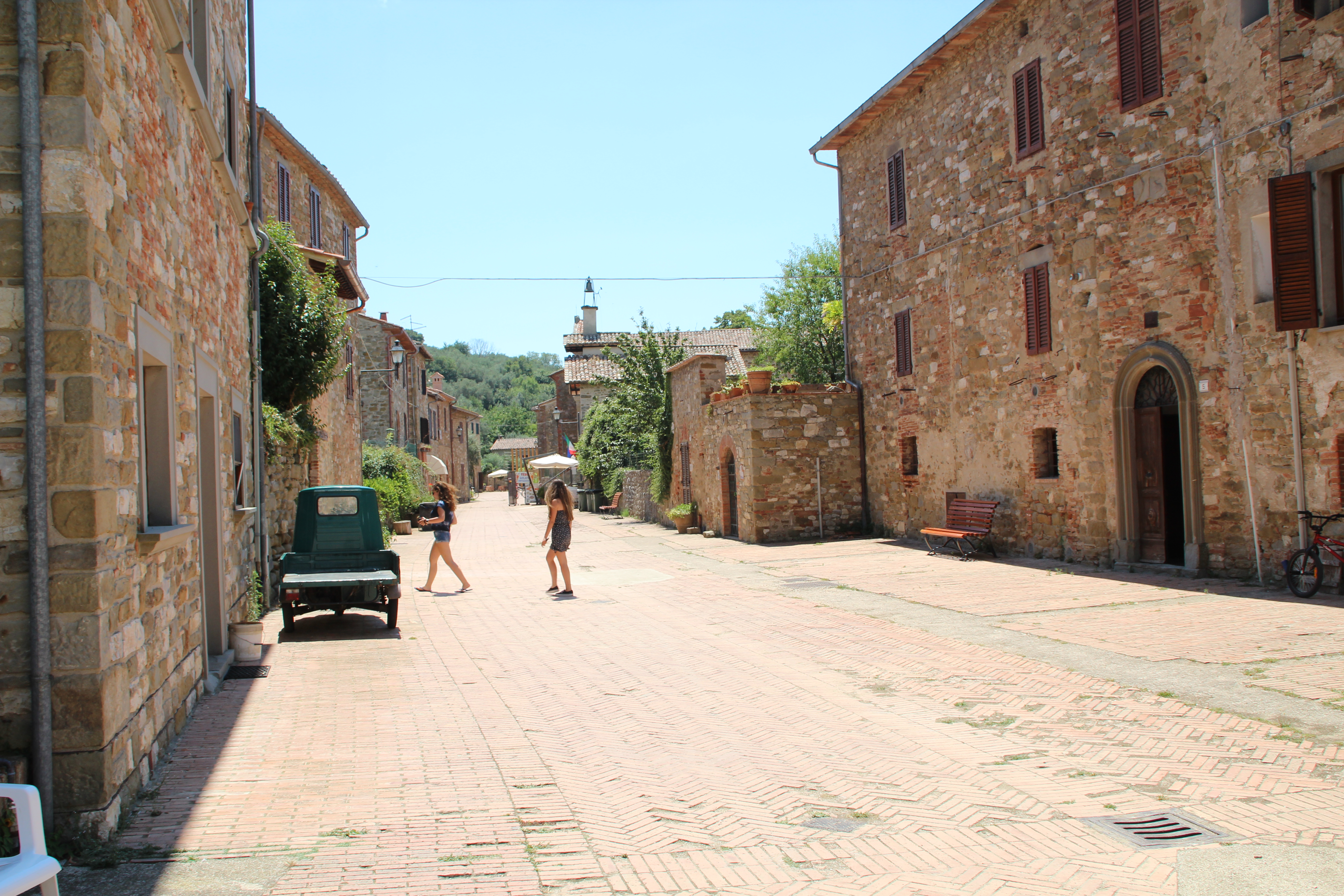
The main paved street of Isola Maggiore, lined with medieval houses

Isola Maggiore is described as a significant example of fishermen's village architecture.

The island contains a small village consisting of a single completely paved road lined with houses dating to the 13th and 14th centuries, including the house of the Captain of the People.

==== Guglielmi Castle ====
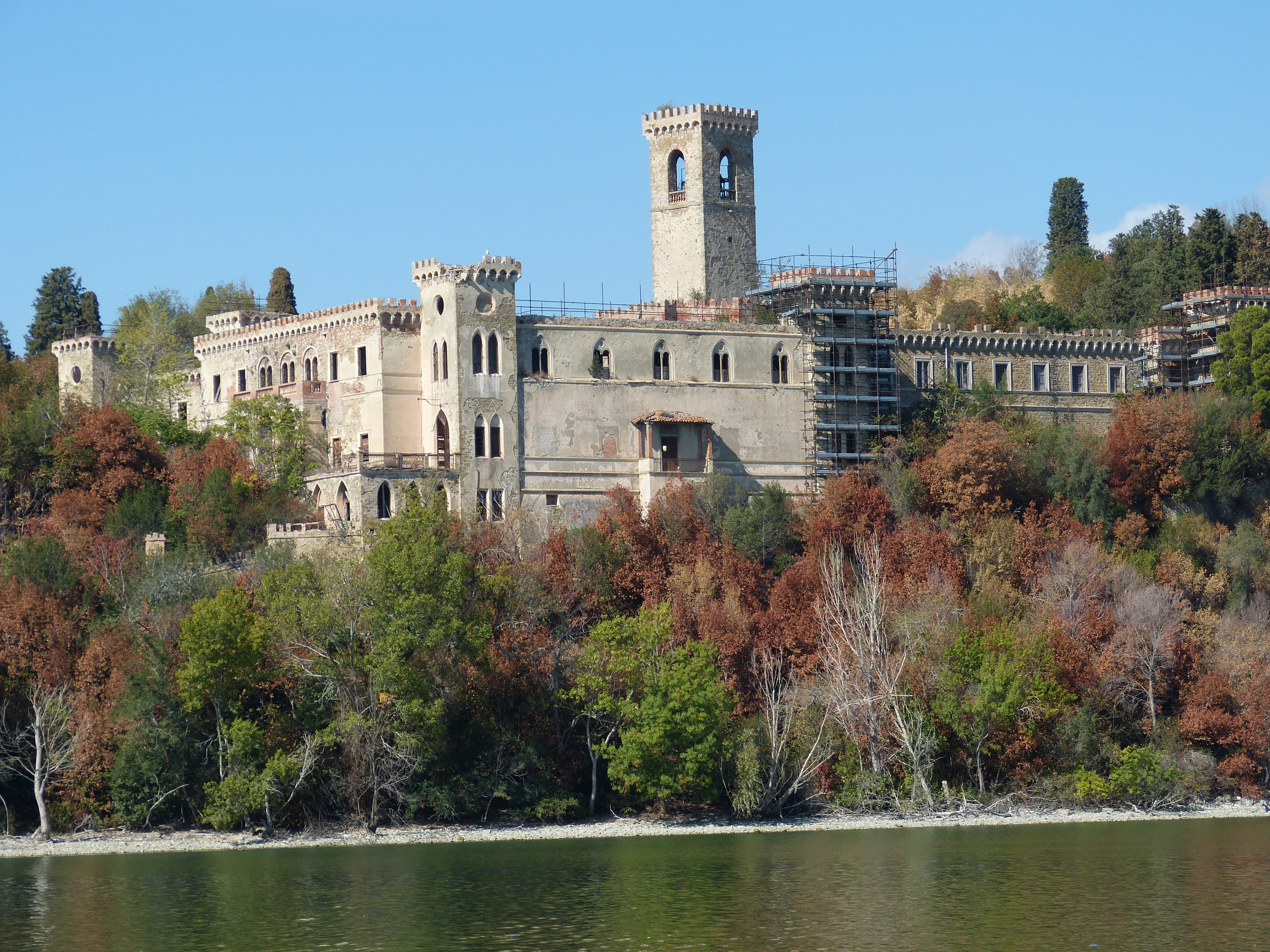
Guglielmi Castle, late 19th century

At the southeastern tip of Isola Maggiore stood a convent and church of the Friars Minor Observant, founded in 1328 to commemorate Saint Francis of Assisi, who was traditionally believed to have spent forty days on the island in prayer and fasting. The complex was enlarged and restored in 1480 by the counts of Marsciano and is recorded as having hosted notable figures including Conrad of Offida, Bernardino of Siena, and Pope Pius II, who stayed there in 1459.

The convent was suppressed during the Napoleonic period, restored in 1815, and definitively abandoned in January 1867 following the Italian suppression of religious orders. The former church, described as ogival in style and later incorporated into the residence, contained a panel painting of the Madonna col Bambino e quattro Angeli, attributed to a 15th-century Sienese school.

After its abandonment, the complex was briefly used as a school by the municipality before being acquired by the Guglielmi family of Rome. In 1885, Marquis Giacinto Guglielmi transformed the former monastery into a neo-Gothic residence, known as Castello Guglielmi (also called Villa Isabella), reusing much of the Franciscan structure and leaving only the small Church of St. Francis intact.

=== Lacework ===
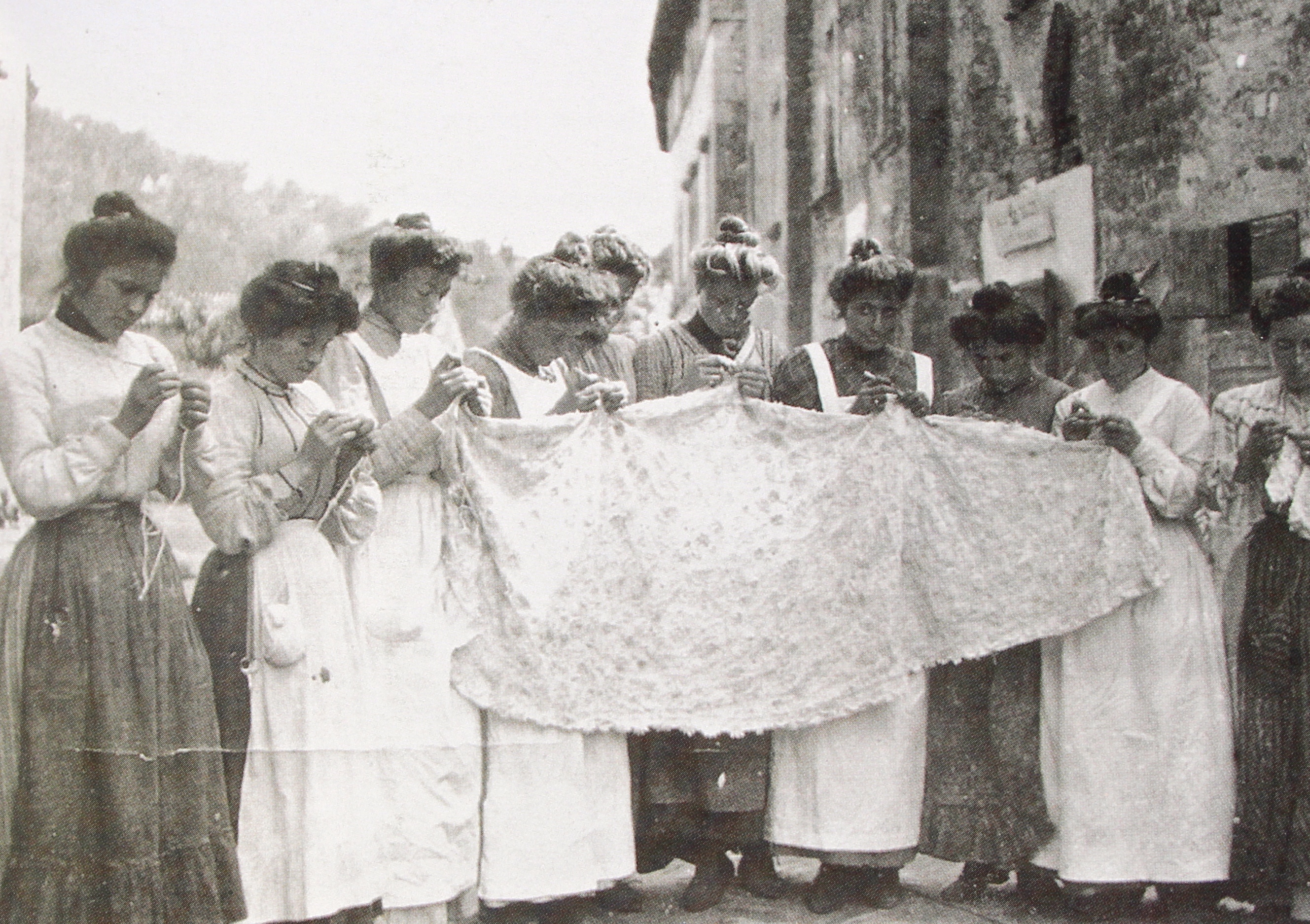
Women of Isola Maggiore engaged in lace-making, early 20th century

In the early 20th century, Irish crochet lace was introduced to Isola Maggiore by Marchesa Elena Guglielmi. Lace-making, carried out with a crochet hook and very fine thread, was organized through a school founded to provide employment for the island's young women, and the practice was traditionally transmitted from mother to daughter. For roughly a century, this activity (locally known as pizzo di Isola or pizzo d'Irlanda) constituted the principal occupation of the island's women.

The history of lace-making on Isola Maggiore is documented by the Museo del Merletto, which exhibits works and tools associated with the craft from 1904 onward.

== Notable people ==
Isola Maggiore was the birthplace of Guido Vannucci, who later obtained Perugian citizenship and taught grammar and classical authors in Perugia, eventually holding the chair of rhetoric there. In the 15th century, Vannucci was an active figure in Perugia's humanist milieu, teaching for approximately twenty years between 1443 and 1463 and appearing in both contemporary and later discussions of the city's cultural life.

The island was also the place of origin of Matteo dall'Isola, the author of the work Trasimenide dated to 1527.
