= Isola (given name) =

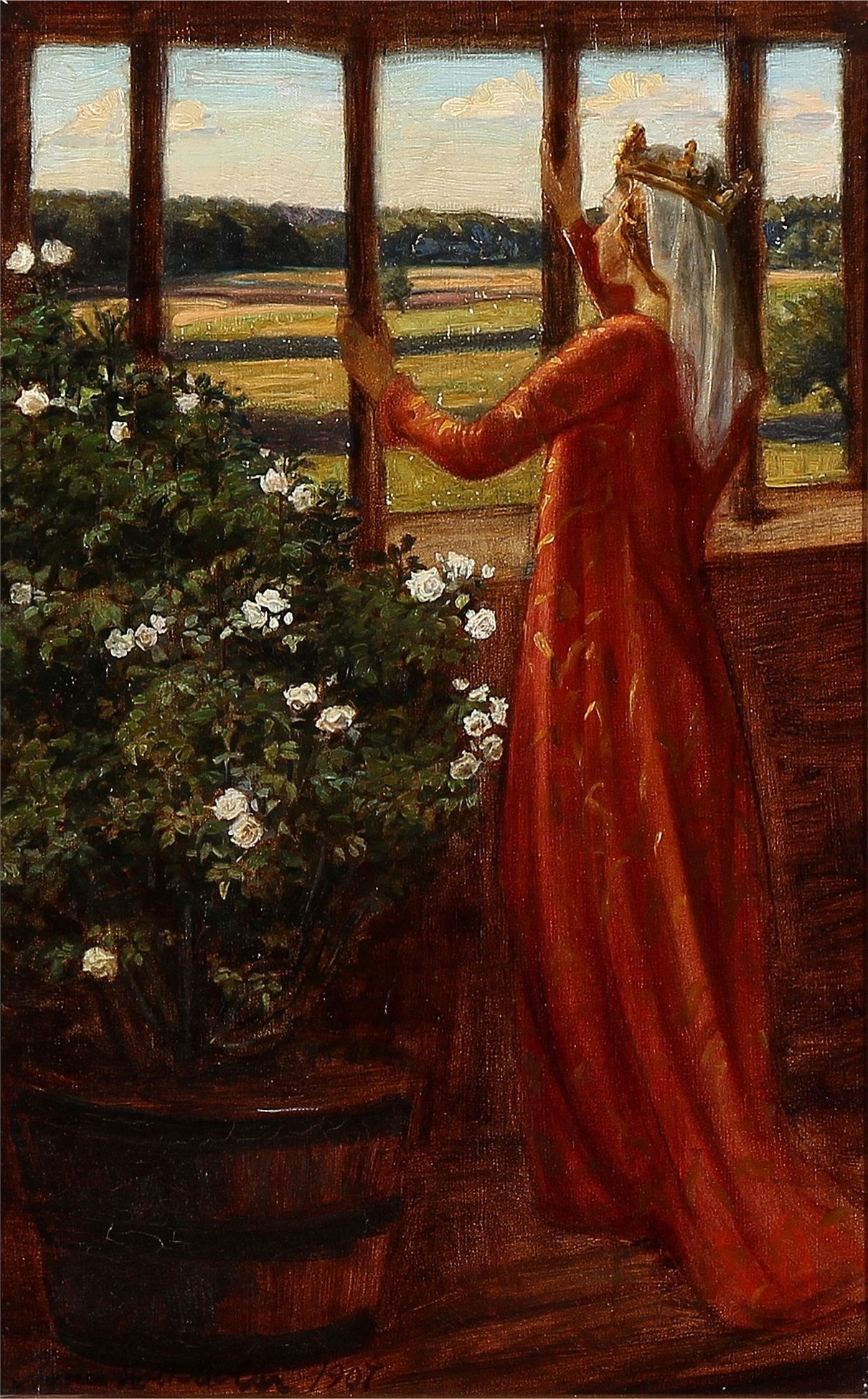
- Isolde by Agnes Slott-Møller, 1907. Isola has been used by some as a version of the name Isolde.
- Gender: Feminine
- Language: Various

Origin
- Meaning: Brythonic she who is gazed upon; English isolation; Italian island

Other names
- Related names: Esyllt, Ila, Isela, Iselda, Iseult, Isla, Islah, Islana, Islay, Isleta, Isletta, Isolda, Isolde, Isoletta, Isolina, Isota, Isotta, Izett, Izola, Ysé, Yseult, Ysleta

Isola is a given name with multiple origins in different languages. It is occasionally derived from the English vocabulary word isolated or used as a variation of the Celtic name Iseult or Isolde. Elaborations in use in the 1800s included Isoletta, Isolina, and Izola, among others. It is also an Italian vocabulary word meaning island, and a Finnish, Italian, and Nigerian surname.

== Women ==
- Isola Jones (born 1949), American mezzo-soprano
- Isola Kennedy (1871–1909), American Sunday school teacher who died of rabies after a mountain lion attack
- Isola Florence Thompson (1861–1915), Australian educator
- Isola Francesca Emily Wilde (1857–1867), the younger sister of Irish playwright, novelist, and journalist Oscar Wilde, about whom he wrote the poem Requiescat
