= Izolda =

Izolda is a feminine given name. Notable people with the name include:

- Izolda Barudžija, Serbian and former Yugoslav singer
- Vlado Kalember and Izolda Barudzija, pop duo that represented Yugoslavia at the Eurovision Song Contest 1984
- Izolda Izvitskaya (1932–1971), Soviet actress

== See also ==
- Isolda Dychauk (born 1993), German actress
- Szold
- Zelda (disambiguation)
