= Isolation (board game) =

Abstract board game published in 1972

1972 game board. Red has finished a move, it is now Black's turn.

Isolation is an abstract board game published by Ravensburger in 1972 in Germany as Isola, and then published internationally by licensed game companies under the titles Stranded and Isolation.

== Description ==
Isolation is a 2-player game in which each player tries to isolate the other player's pawn.

=== Components ===
The game box contains

- the gameboard — a 6 x 8 grid with empty squares except for the third square from the left on the short sides, which contain either a slightly raised platform in some editions, or two round pawn-sized holes in other editions
- 46 square tiles — plastic in some editions, or wood in others
- 2 different colored pawns.

=== Set up ===
The tiles are placed in all the empty squares, and each player's pawn is placed on one of the raised platforms or in the round holes, depending on edition.

=== Gameplay ===
The first player moves their pawn 1 square in any direction, and then selects and removes any tile on the board, leaving an empty square that cannot be entered by either pawn. The second player performs the same sequence, moving their pawn and removing any tile. Play then alternates between the two players.

=== Victory conditions ===
The first player to isolate their opponent's pawn so that it has no legal move is the winner.

== Publication history ==
In 1972, Bernd Kienitz designed a game titled Isola, which was published as a multilingual game (in Dutch, English, French, German, and Italian) by Ravensburger, with artwork by Kienitz and Ulrike Schneiders. The following year Ravensburger released a Nordic version of Isola (Danish, Finnish, Norwegian, and Swedish). In 1976, Hallmark Games published an English-only version titled Stranded. Two years later Lakeside Toys released the game in North America under the title Isolation.

== Reception ==
In Issue 7 of Games, Bernie De Koven called this a game "that takes only a minute to learn and five minutes to play — a game that is, in fact, innovative, well-made, and diabolically fascinating." De Koven concluded, "I like everything about this game. Just punching out the platforms gives me a fiendish sense of power. And then, suddenly discovering that my pawn is on the brink, faced on every side by the yawning gulf of unbridgeable void... well, it's delightfully horrible!"

In 1980, Games chose this game for inclusion in "The Games 100, 1980 Edition." Games repeated this honor in 1981, adding, "The game is simple to learn, but the strategy is very tricky."

== Other reviews and commentary ==
- Jeux & Stratégie #2
- Jeux & Stratégie #6
- Games & Puzzles #58
