= Census in the Papal States =

Demographic records of the Papal States (17th–19th centuries)

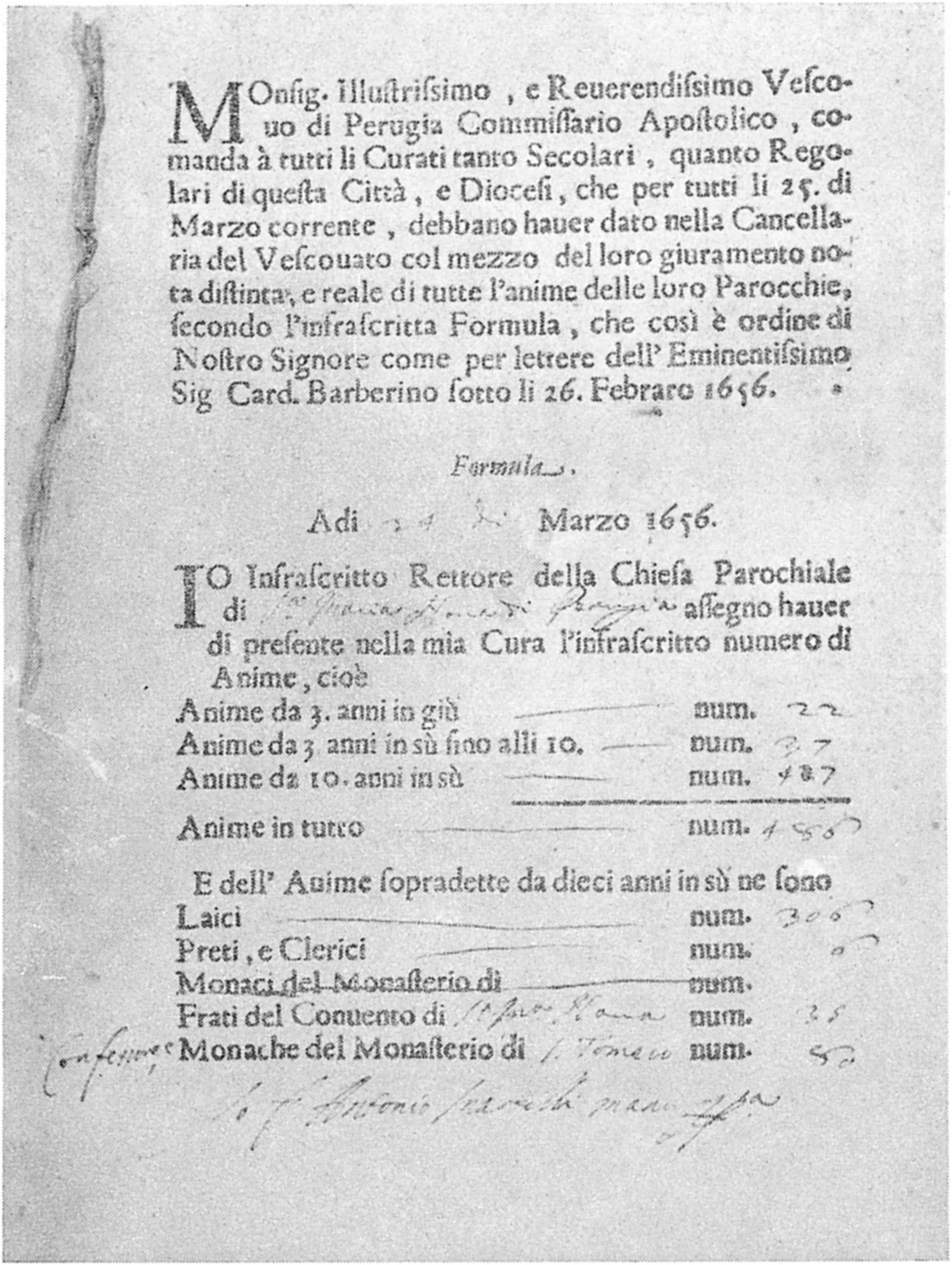
Form used in Perugia for the 1656 census

The Papal States carried out several censuses and territorial surveys between the 17th and 19th centuries.

According to Alberto Ferrantini, the main demographic documentation of the Papal States consists of the censuses of 1656, 1701, 1708, 1736, 1782, 1844, and 1853, as well as the Riparti territoriali (administrative and demographic distributions) of 1816, 1827, and 1833.

The French administration (1809–1814) also compiled demographic statistics for the departments of the Tibre and the Trasimène, but these were later judged by Ferrantini to contain significant errors and to be unreliable.

== Riparto territoriale of 1816 ==
The Riparto territoriale of 1816 was published in two editions (1816 and 1817), each based on different demographic sources. Ferrantini's archival research established that:

- the 1816 edition reflects data from the 1802 census conducted by the Congregazione del buon governo for Lazio, Umbria, and the Marche;
- for the province of Forlì, the data derive instead from the 1782 census;
- the 1817 edition incorporates corrections and interpolations, some influenced by French statistics from 1810 to 1813, and is therefore of limited practical value.

Overall, comparison across the available documents shows a high level of consistency: for Lazio, Umbria, and the Marche, 89.3% of communes had identical figures between the 1802 census and the first edition of the 1816 Riparto.
