= Castel Rigone Calcio =

Italian football club

Castel Rigone
- Full name: Castel Rigone Calcio S.r.l.
- Founded: 1998
- Dissolved: 2014
- Ground: Stadio San Bartolomeo, Castel Rigone, Passignano sul Trasimeno, Italy
- Capacity: 800
- Chairman: Brunello Cucinelli
- Manager: Luca Fusi
Home colours	Away colours

Castel Rigone Calcio was an Italian association football club, based in Castel Rigone, a frazione of Passignano sul Trasimeno, Umbria. Castel Rigone last played in Lega Pro Seconda Divisione.

== History ==
The club was founded in 1998. In 2002 it was promoted from Terza Categoria Umbra, the lowest league in its region, to Eccellenza Umbra in just 4 years through 4 successive championships. In 2009 it was promoted to Serie D as runners-up and Coppa Umbria Eccellenza winners. In 2013 it was promoted (as Group E champions) to Lega Pro Seconda Divisione for the first and only venture in the pros, but ended second from bottom at season's end. However, it refused to return to Serie D and was excluded, closing the senior side. It now handles only youth football.

== Colors and badge ==
The team's colors were white and blue.
