= Girolamo da Udine =

Girolamo da Udine may refer to:

- Girolamo da Udine, another name for the Italian composer Girolamo Dalla Casa
- Girolamo da Udine, another name for the Italian painter Girolamo di Bernardino
