= Brunello Cucinelli (brand) =

Italian luxury fashion house

Brunello Cucinelli S.p.A.
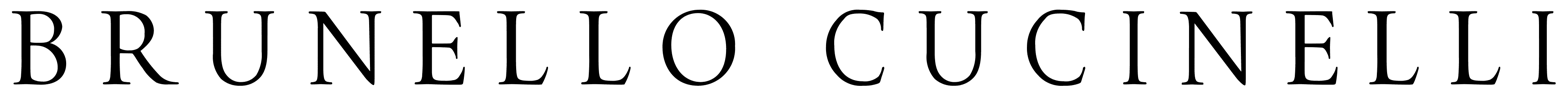

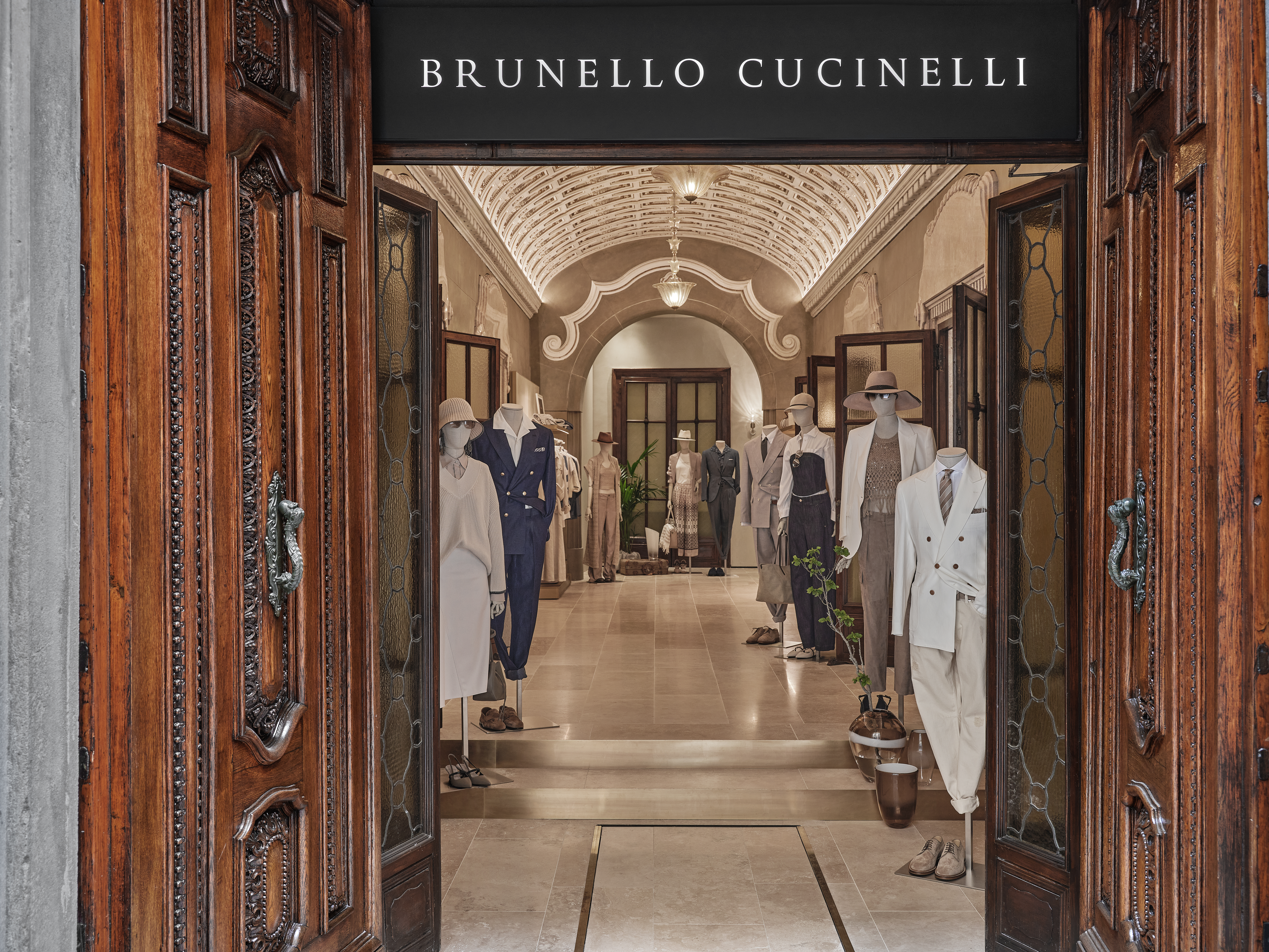
- Brunello Cucinelli boutique in Venice
- Type: Società per Azioni
- Traded as: BIT: BC; FTSE MIB
- ISIN: IT0004764699
- Industry: Fashion, Luxury
- Founded: 1978; 48 years ago
- Headquarters: Solomeo, Perugia, Italy
- Key people: Brunello Cucinelli (Executive Chairman and Creative Director), Riccardo Stefanelli (Co-CEO)
- Revenue: €1.28 billion (2024)
- Number of employees: 3,101 (2024)
- Website: shop.brunellocucinelli.com

Brunello Cucinelli S.p.A. (Italian pronunciation: [bruˈnɛllo kutʃiˈnɛlli]) is an Italian luxury fashion brand which sells menswear, women's wear and accessories in Europe, North and South America and East Asia. The company was founded by Brunello Cucinelli in 1978.

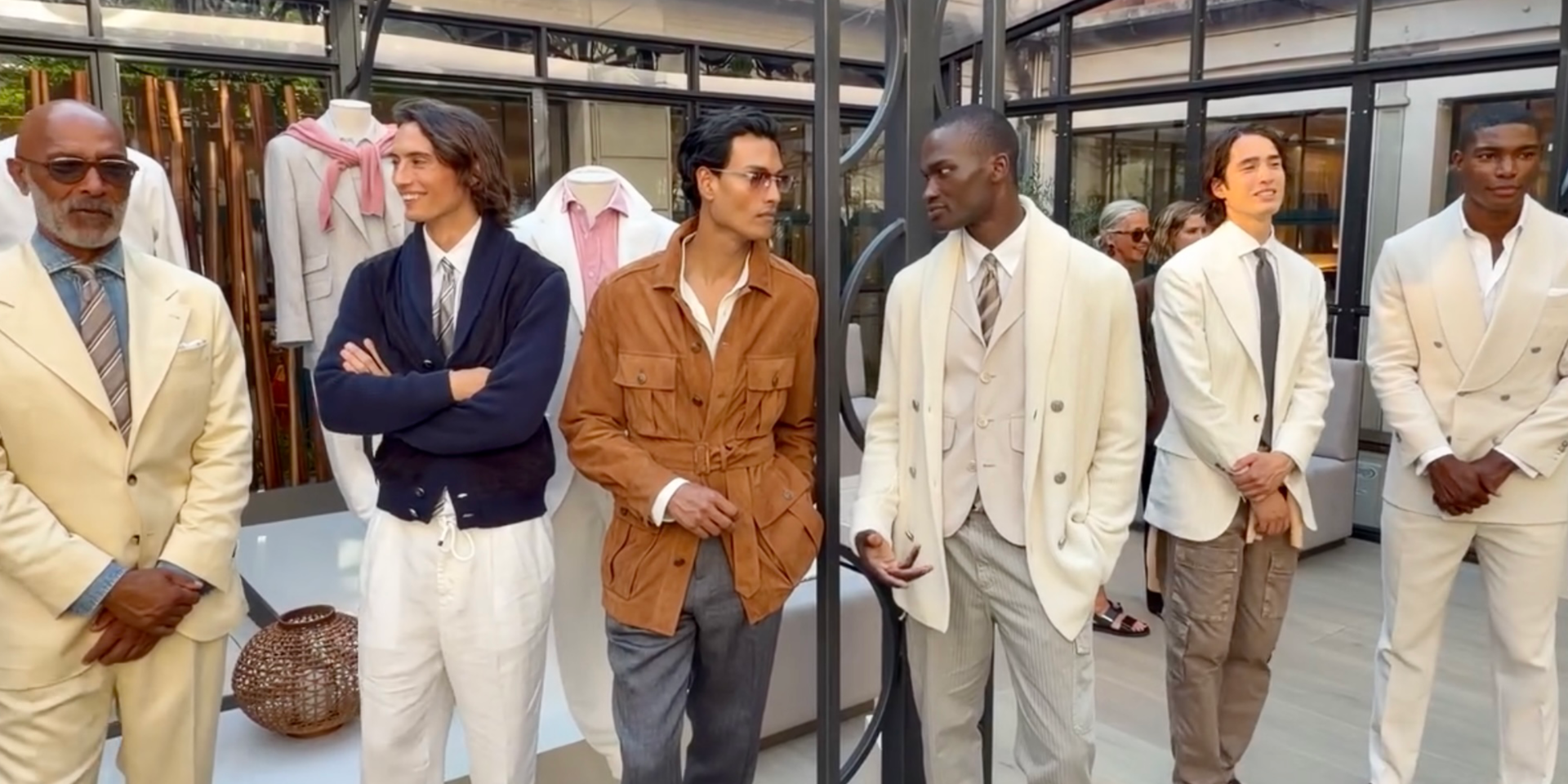
Brunello Cucinelli Men’s Spring/Summer 2027 Collection at Milan Fashion Week

Brunello Cucinelli is recognized as being part of the quiet luxury movement. Brunello has been titled the "King of Cashmere" for his pioneering and commitment to premium materials and ethical craftsmanship.

== History ==
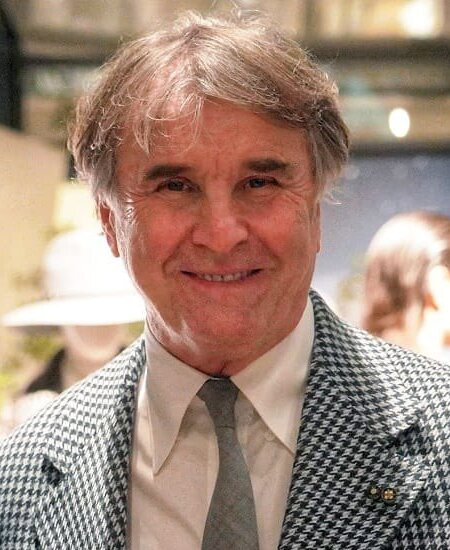
Cucinelli in 2026

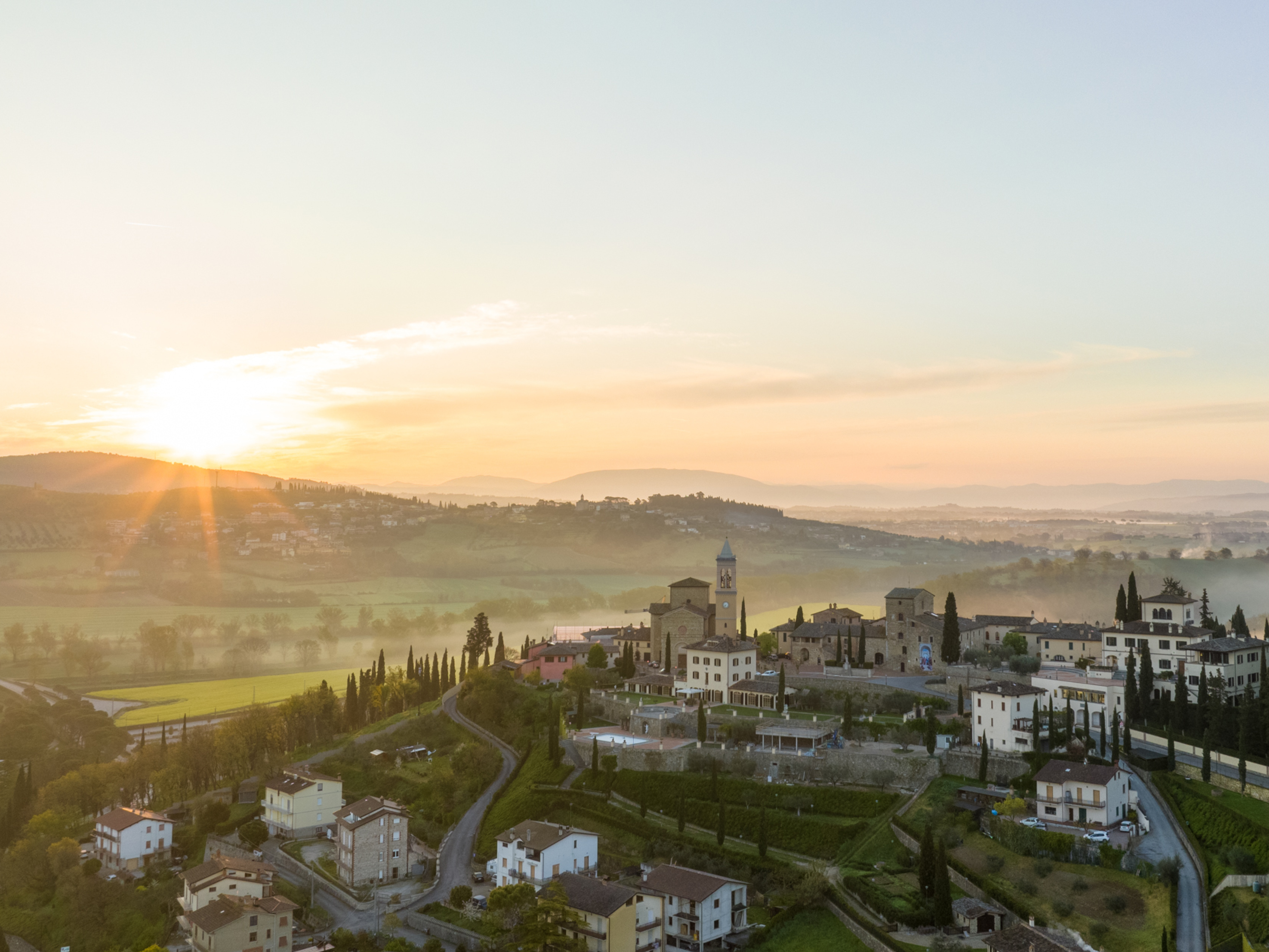
Solomeo, Italy

Brunello Cucinelli founded the company in 1978, focusing on artisanal women's knitwear in coloured cashmere—unusual at the time. In 1985 he acquired the 14th-century castle of Solomeo, a small medieval village on the outskirts of Perugia; after a two-year restoration, the company's headquarters were moved there in 1987. In 2001, following the redevelopment of several disused factories, the main offices were relocated to the valley at the foot of the village.

The regeneration of the surrounding area continued and, after several years of work, the Park of Beauty was inaugurated in 2014. The company was listed on the Italian Stock Exchange (Borsa Italiana) in 2012, and in 2023 it joined the FTSE MIB index with a market capitalisation of about €5.7 billion. Production is entirely made in Italy, primarily in the Umbria region, and the manufacturing process retains an artisanal component. In line with this approach, the School of Crafts in Solomeo was established to pass on manufacturing skills to new generations.

In June 2014, owner Brunello Cucinelli, transferred the ownership of Fedone S.r.l. (which owned 61.56% of the fashion brand) to a new trust, Esperia Trust Company S.r.l., in a move to benefit his daughters and pursue his philanthropic work.

In 2017, Brunello Cucinelli recorded 500 million euro in sales, 35% of which in North America. The company owns 94 of its 124 branded stores worldwide. In January 2017, the company launched an ecommerce website. In January 2018, the founder, Brunello Cucinelli, sold 4 million shares of his company (owned through his holding Fedone S.r.l.), and brought his participation down to 51% of the company's capital. Through this move, 6% of the company (worth 100 million euros) was invested in his family's charitable fund.

In 2022, Brunello Cucinelli joined Chanel in investing in cashmere supplier Cariaggi Lanificio and bought a 43 percent stake in the company. Brunello Cucinelli acquired 43% of Cariaggi for €15.05 million.

In 2023, the brand increased its sales by 24% compared to 2022, to 1.14 billion euros. The last quarter of the year recorded the highest results, with sales up +15.6% to 321 million euros. A year later in 2024, Brunello Cucinelli strengthened its production line in Italy with the acquisition of the Sartoria Eugubina sewing workshop and the construction of a new factory to meet the increasing consumer demand.

The firm earns 36% of its revenues from the wholesale channel and around 64% from its own retail stores.

== Other activities ==
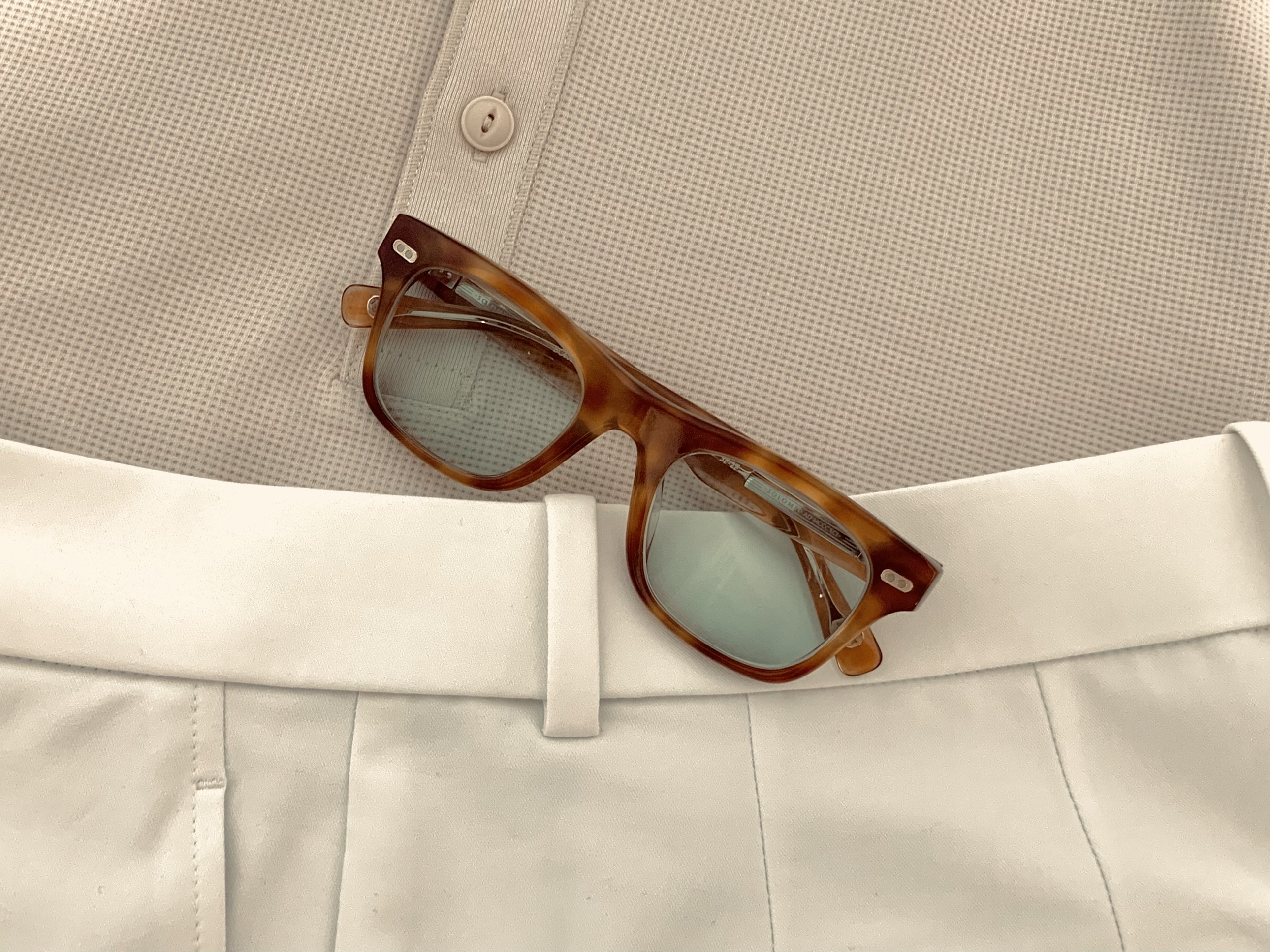
Brunello Cucinelli eyewear “Mr.Brunello” with light-tint lenses

In 2022, Brunello Cucinelli entered into a licensing agreement with EssilorLuxottica on luxury eyewear for men and women.

In 2023, Brunello Cucinelli started its first entry into the world of perfume as it introduced two scents designed with Euroitalia, a company specialized in the creation and distribution of luxury fragrances.

== Corporate Ethics ==
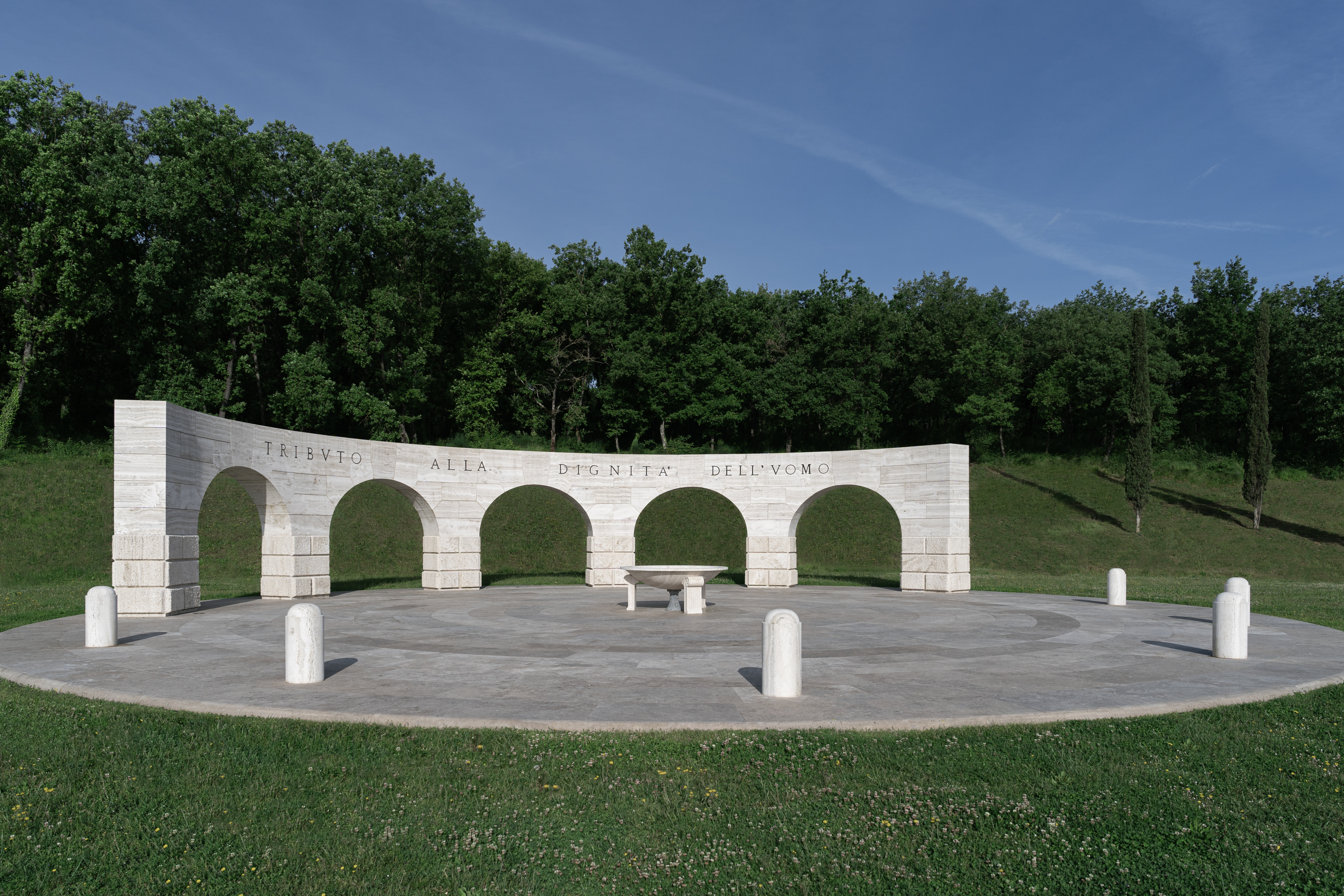
The monument built by Brunello Cucinelli in Solomeo, “Tributo alla dignità dell’uomo” (a tribute to the dignity of mankind)

The company adopts the principles of "humanistic capitalism," a term coined by Brunello Cucinelli, which frames profit in ethical terms and links it to economic growth balanced by initiatives that support workers, the environment, and the community. The approach centers the individual and protects moral and economic dignity, including through welcoming, light-filled workspaces and adherence to set working hours.

== Organization ==
Cucinelli controls the company through Foro delle Arti S.r.l. (formerly Fedone S.r.l.). The Brunello Cucinelli Trust holds approximately 50.05% of the company's share capital, and the company went public in 2012 at €7.75 per share.

In 2014, Cucinelli set up a trust to benefit his daughters, Camilla and Carolina, in order to guarantee a proper handover of his namesake company.

The company is headquartered in a 14th-century castle on the top of a hill in the middle of Umbria, an area known as the "green heart" of Italy.

As of June 2017, the company has a market capitalization of over €1.6 billion. The company donates 20% of profits to its charitable foundation.

== See also ==
- Made in Italy
