= Floriani =

Floriani is an Italian surname. Notable people with the surname include:

- Francesco Floriani (fl. 1568), Italian painter
- Pietro Paolo Floriani (1585–1638), Italian engineer and architect
- Romano Floriani Mussolini (born 2003), Italian professional footballer
- Yuri Floriani (born 1981), Italian steeplechase runner
