= Orsino Carota =

Italian painter

- Born: Assisi, Umbria
- Died: 24 January 1592
- Occupation: Painter
- Years active: fl. 1530–1582

Orsino Carota (early 16th century – 24 January 1592) was an Italian painter of the Renaissance, born in Assisi and active mainly in Perugia. A pupil of the Perugian master Pompeo di Piergentile Cocchi, he is documented in Perugia from 1530 and worked on civic and religious commissions through the later sixteenth century.

== Biography ==
Carota is first recorded in 1530 in Perugia, where he apprenticed with Pompeo di Piergentile Cocchi. Among his earliest documented tasks was participation, together with other local artists, in the ephemeral decorations for triumphal arches erected to welcome Pope Paul III to Perugia on 24 October 1541. Following Cocchi’s death, Carota inherited his master’s estate, obtained Perugian citizenship in 1552 and joined the city’s painters’ guild in 1553; he later served as the guild’s chamberlain in 1564.

In 1557 he painted an outdoor fresco for the Confraternity of Sant’Antonio at Assisi (restored in 1586). Between 1558 and 1559 he executed several works for the Confraternity of San Francesco in Perugia, including an oil painting of Saint Francis—identified by sources as his only securely attributed canvas—which is held by the city’s gallery (now the Galleria Nazionale dell'Umbria). In 1582 he painted frescoed lunettes on the exterior portals of the Sanctuary of Santa Maria di Mongiovino near Panicale. He died on 24 January 1592 and was buried in the church of San Francesco, near the tomb of his former master Cocchi.
