= Migiana =

- Frazione
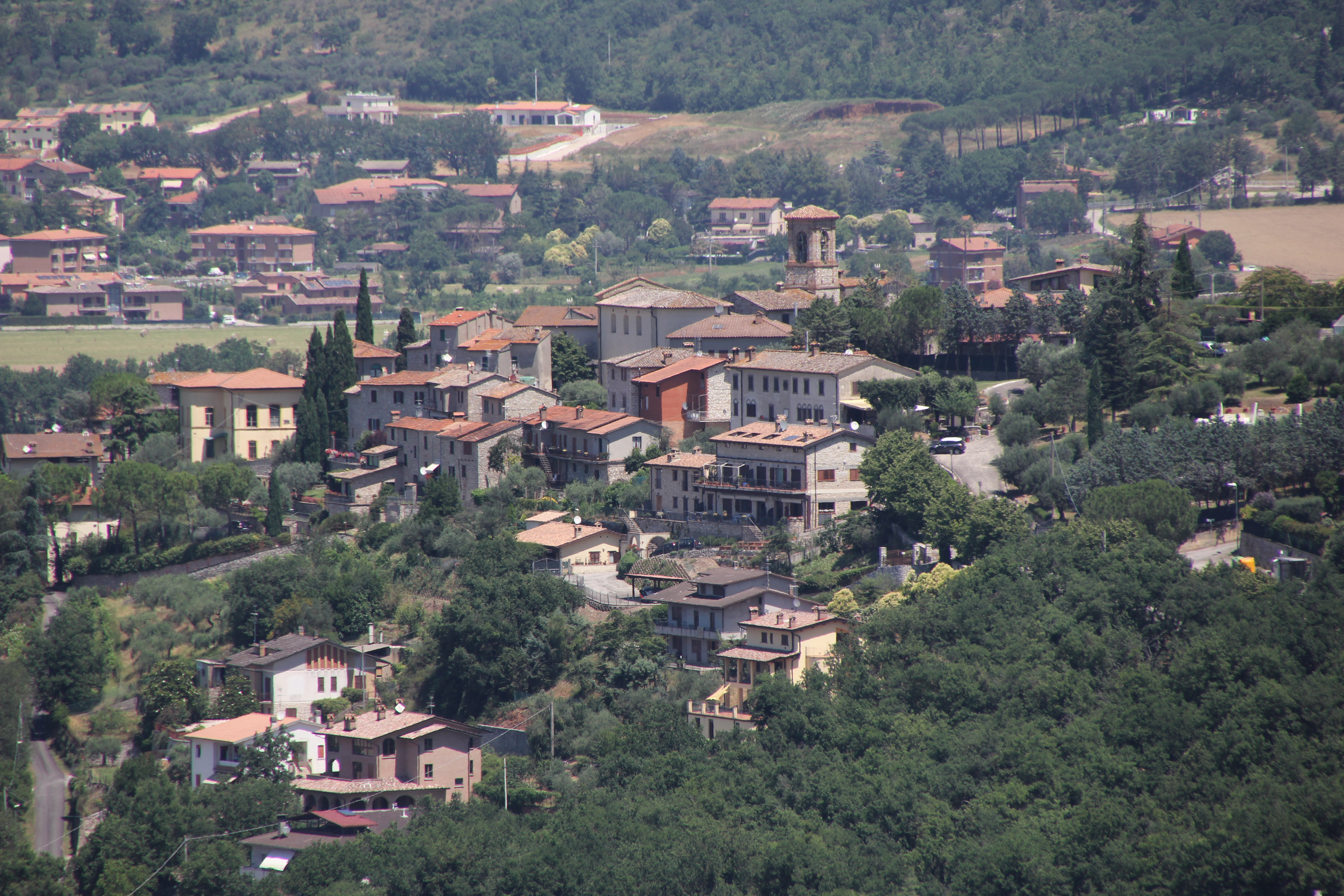

- Location of Migiana in Italy
- Coordinates: 43°08′44″N 12°17′31″E
- Country: Italy
- Region: Umbria
- Province: Perugia
- Comune: Corciano
- Elevation: 301 m (988 ft)

Population (2001)
  - Total: 222
- Time zone: UTC+1 (CET)
  - Summer (DST): UTC+2 (CEST)
- Dialing code: 075

Migiana is a frazione of the comune of Corciano in the Province of Perugia, Umbria, central Italy. It stands at an elevation of 301 metres above sea level. At the time of the Istat census of 2001, it had 222 inhabitants.
