= Castel Rigone =

- Frazione
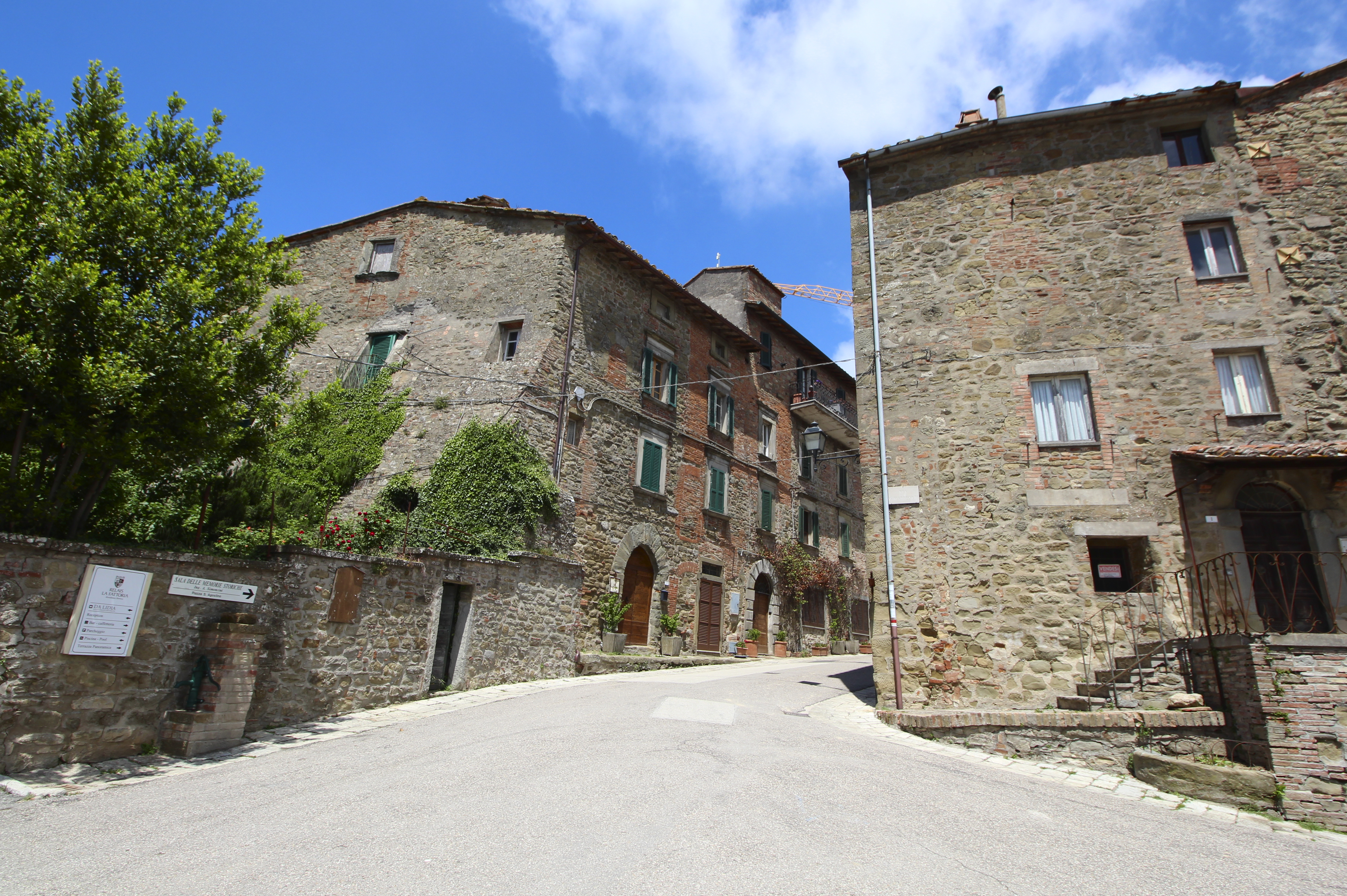
- Castel Rigone

- Location of Castel Rigone in Italy
- Coordinates: 43°12′N 12°13′E
- Country: Italy
- Region: Umbria
- Province: Perugia
- Comune: Passignano sul Trasimeno
- Elevation: 653 m (2,142 ft)

Population (2021)
  - Total: 440
- Time zone: UTC+1 (CET)
  - Summer (DST): UTC+2 (CEST)

Castel Rigone is a frazione of the comune (municipality) of Passignano sul Trasimeno, Umbria, central Italy.

As of 2021, it had 440 inhabitants, and is located 12 km from Passignano.

== Etymology ==
According to tradition, the name derives from that of an Ostrogoth commander, Rigo, who in 543 had set here a base for the siege of Perugia during the Gothic Wars.

== History ==
In the mid-19th century, the population amounted to 1,272 inhabitants. Of these, 267 people live in the village itself, while 1,005 reside in rural houses scattered through the countryside.

The inhabitants were distributed among four parishes: the parish of Castel Rigone itself, and the parishes of Col Piccione, Treggine, Val di Rosa and Pian di Marte. Most of these dwellings were reportedly located among woods or in rugged and secluded places.

== Geography ==
Castel Rigone stands on a high hill, about 4 miles (6.4 km) from Magione and 5 miles (8.0 km) from Passignano. It has the form of a small village with a central square. The landscape includes wooded areas and rugged terrain.

The area abounds particularly in oak trees and small chestnuts. Vineyards are also present.

== Economy ==
Due to its excellent position on the high hills of Trasimeno, the town is a tourist destination and has a strong development in agritourism. The proximity of vast wooded areas also makes it ideal for trekking, horseback riding and bird watching enthusiasts. There is a small amusement park, currently in poor condition. The offer of services is completed by a minimarket, a pharmacy, a doctor's office, some ATMs, various bars and a mechanical workshop.

Since the Middle Ages the village has been renowned for the treatment of respiratory diseases (Clinica La Castellana). The small hospital still exists (now the seat of an Archconfraternity built in the 15th century by the Sovereign Hospitaller Order of St. John, Rhodes and Malta (Order of Malta) as an annex of their settlement and Castello di Magione (6 km) still owned of the order.

== Religion and culture ==
Churches of Castel Rigone

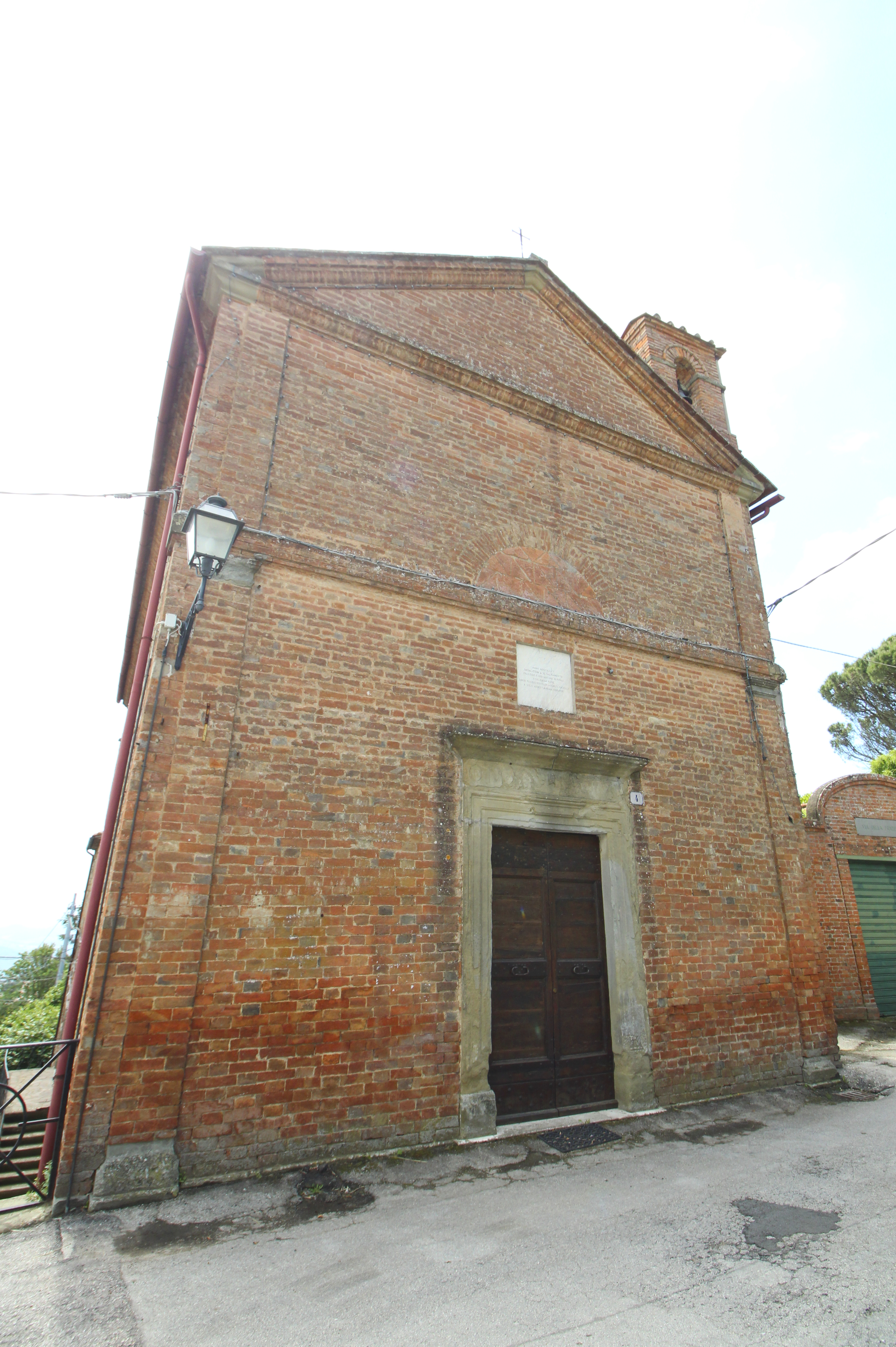
Santissimo Sacramento

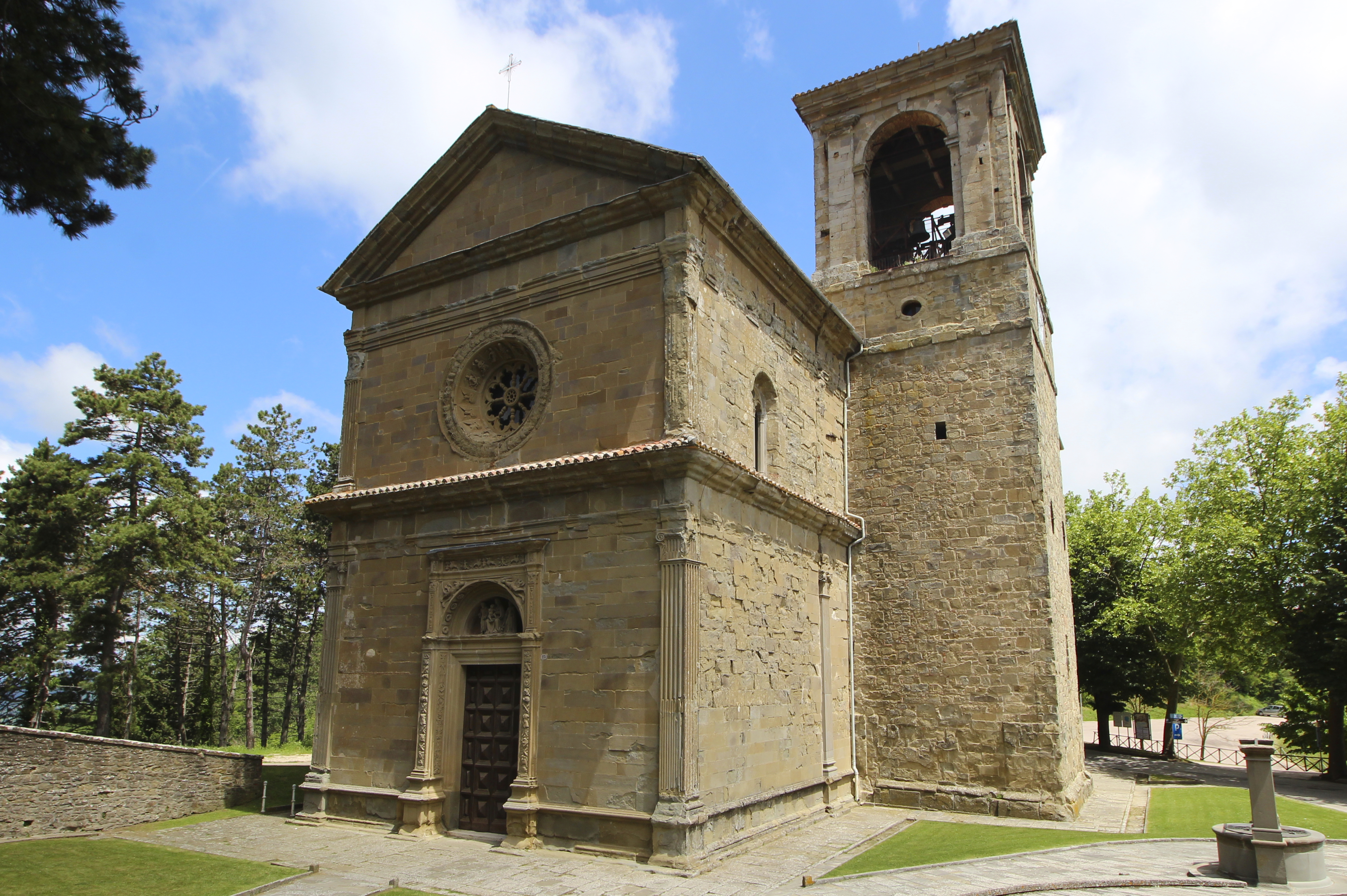
Madonna dei Miracoli

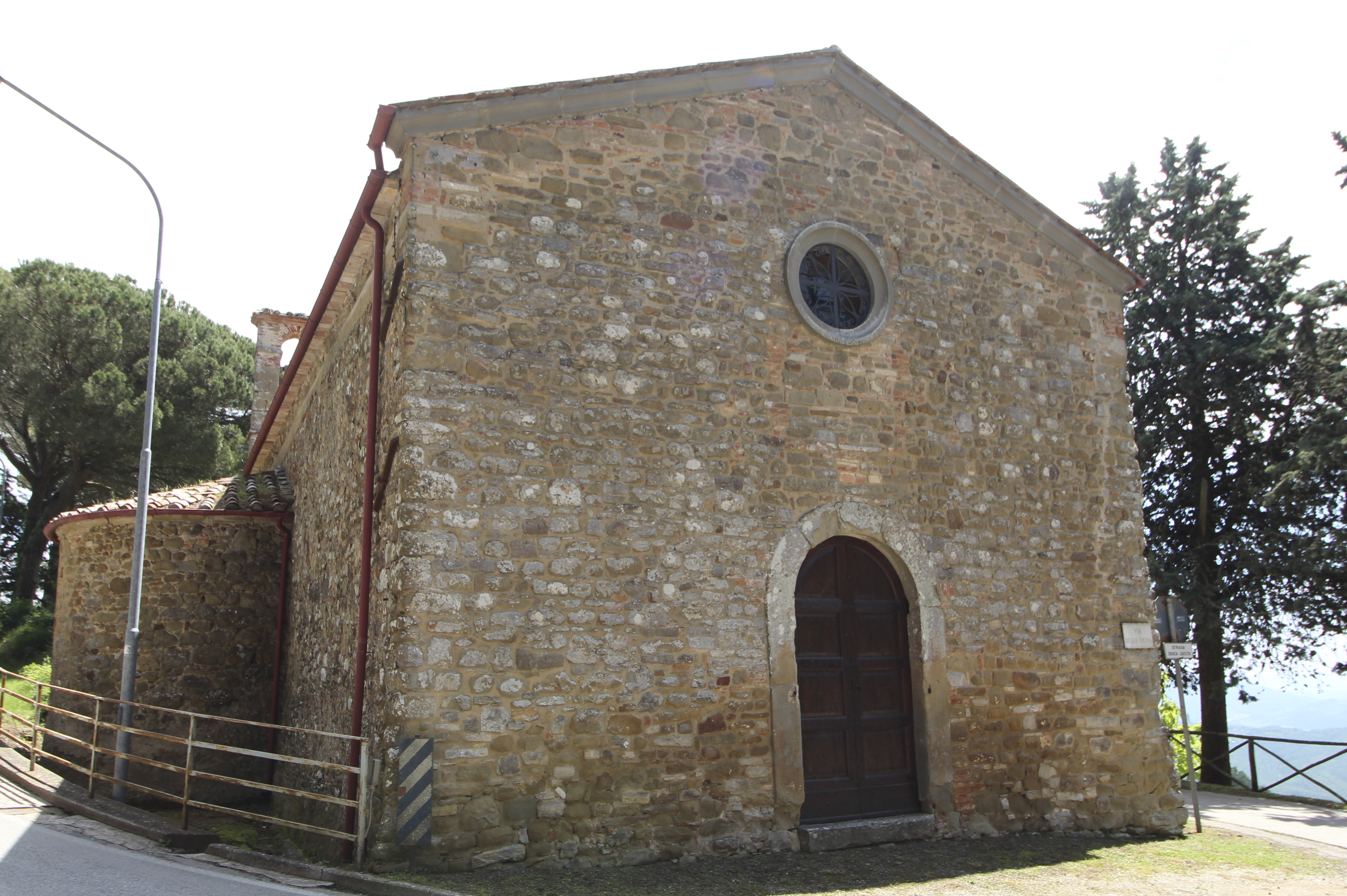
San Bartolomeo

=== Madonna dei Miracoli ===
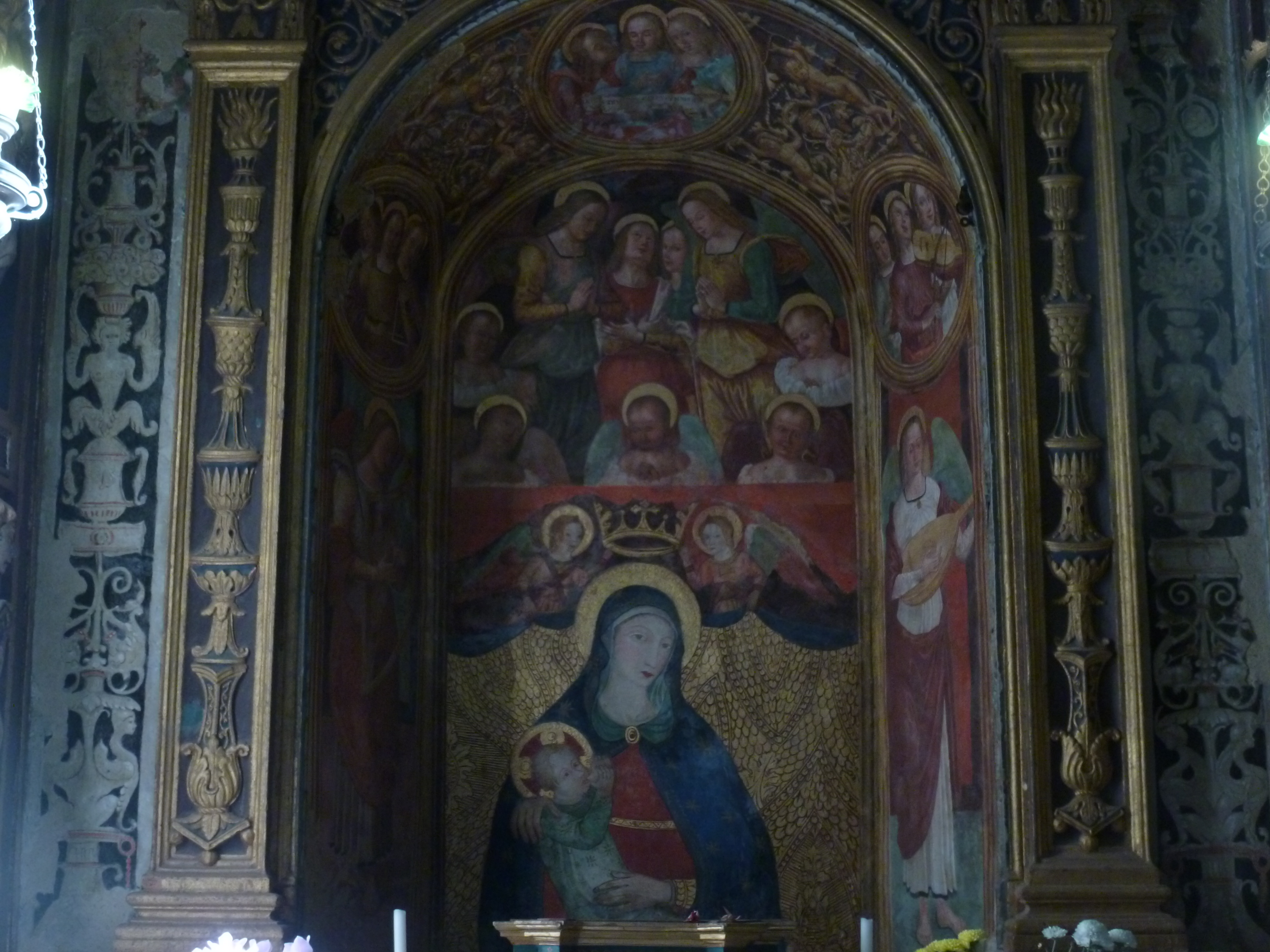
The Miracle Madonna

The Church of the Madonna dei Miracoli began construction in 1494. It was designed by Rocco di Tommaso da Vicenza, pupil of Donato Bramante. The building was restored in 1902–1903 following a project by Benvenuti. The main façade is decorated with sculptures and stone carvings. In the lunette above the entrance is a notable sculptural group depicting the Virgin with the Child, flanked by Saints Augustine and Bartholomew. The portal was created in 1512 by Domenico Bertini.

Inside the church, the first altar on the right contains a 16th-century marble statue of Saint Anthony Abbot. The second altar contains the Madonna of the Rosary, an oil painting dated 1558 by the Florentine painter Bernardo di Girolamo. On the altar opposite is a fresco of the Coronation of the Virgin, with the Apostles gathered around her tomb below, attributed to the school of Pietro Perugino.

In the apse, within a large carved frame created in 1528 by Bernardino di Lazzaro, are panel paintings by Domenico Alfani. The lunette shows God the Father Blessing, while the predella depicts the Annunciation, the Birth of the Virgin, the Visitation to Saint Elizabeth, and the Announcing Angel, all painted in oil on panel by Alfani. At the center is the Epiphany, a copy by a Tuscan artist after the original by Alfani, which had been designed by the Florentine Del Bosso and once stood here but was transferred to Florence in 1643 by order of Ferdinando II de' Medici.

In the left transept, within a chapel, is the Madonna dei Miracoli, an early 15th-century fresco surrounded by a Glory of Angels painted by a pupil of Perugino. This was the miraculous image that had originally existed in a simple shrine and in whose honor the church was erected. In the right transept, within another chapel, is a 14th-century wooden crucifix, surrounded by frescoes depicting the Three Marys on the left and Saints John, Nicodemus, and Joseph of Arimathea on the right, works of the Perugian school.

=== Other heritage sites ===
The ancient castle, of which towers and sections of walls still remain, had existed since the first half of the Middle Ages. After being destroyed, it was rebuilt beginning in 1297.

=== Events ===
Every year there is the Festa dei Barbari and the Giostra di Arrigo (since 1984), to commemorate the era of the Ostrogoth foundation. The historical processions in costume take place in the first week of August, coinciding with the Celtic festival of Lughnasadh (in honor of the god Lugh, giver of abundance and wisdom).

Every year (since 1997) the International Festival of Young Concert Players is held in July and August, with the participation of numerous national and international artists and high-level "ensembles", in the suggestive Piazza Sant'Agostino and in the Church of the Madonna of Miracles.

== Notable people ==
Castel Rigone is the hometown of the Italian Fashion Designer Brunello Cucinelli.
