= Oratory of San Bovo, Padua =

Oratory in Padua, Italy

The Oratory of San Bovo is a Roman Catholic prayer hall or oratory located at Via del Torresino #4 in Padua, in the Veneto region of Italy.

== History ==
The Oratory of San Bovo was established in 1505, with dedication to San Bovo (Saint Bovo) beginning between 1623 and 1630, when it was introduced by the dalla Fraglia dei Bovai. The oratory was moved to its present location in 1908, and the artwork was restored in the 1950s. It retains most of the original artwork, including frescoes. The building now houses the Chamber Orchestra of Padua.

During the move, an altarpiece by Bissoni and a polyptych by Sebastiano Florigerio were lost.

The chapter house of the confraternity features a wooden ceiling with framed units (cassettoni). The frescoes on the wall were painted by Sebastiano Florigerio, Domenico Campagnola, Stefano Dall’Arzere, and possibly Lamberto Sustris, and depict the Life and Passion of Christ. The canvases from the ground floor were moved to the Church of the Torresino, located in front of the oratory. Two Deposition scenes in the oratory are attributed to Florigerio and Campagnola, respectively.

Other works housed here, originally from the Church of the Torresino, are by unknown artists and include:

- Visitation (18th century)
- Knight San Bovo with kneeling villager (19th century)
- Madonna appears to St Bovo (19th century)
- Madonna in Glory with Saints (18th century)
- Christ (17th century)
- St Antony of Padua, half-figure (18th century)
- Birth of Christ attributed to Ludovico di Vernassal
- Portrait of Priest (19th century)
- Madonna and Child (19th century)
- Holy Family (19th century)
- Birth of the Virgin by Ludovico di Vernassal
- Adoration of the Shepherds by Giulio Girello and retouched by L.
- Padua pleads for Liberation from the Plague by Francesco Zanella
- St Christopher and Christ Child with St Francis of Paola (18th century)
