= Taverne di Corciano =

- Frazione
- Location of Taverne di Corciano in Italy
- Country: Italy
- Region: Umbria
- Province: Perugia
- Comune: Corciano
- Time zone: UTC+1 (CET)
  - Summer (DST): UTC+2 (CEST)

Taverne di Corciano is a frazione in Corciano, Umbria, Italy.

Taverne lies about half a mile from Corciano, along the main road connecting Perugia to Magione.

== History ==
In the mid-19th century, Taverne had 111 inhabitants living in 12 families and occupying 12 houses. At that time, there was a modest rural inn serving travelers along the road.

Beginning in the 1970s, Taverne saw the development of an industrial and commercial area in the plain adjacent to the Strada statale 75 bis del Trasimeno.

== Religion ==
The settlement has a small parish church dedicated to Saint Peter.
