= Strozzacapponi =

- Frazione
- Location of Strozzacapponi in Italy
- Coordinates: 43°04′23″N 12°19′00″E
- Country: Italy
- Region: Umbria
- Province: Perugia
- Comune: Corciano
- Elevation: 240 m (790 ft)

Population (2001)
  - Total: 368
- Time zone: UTC+1 (CET)
  - Summer (DST): UTC+2 (CEST)
- Dialing code: 075

Strozzacapponi is a frazione of the comune of Corciano in the Province of Perugia, Umbria, central Italy. It stands at an elevation of 240 metres above sea level. At the time of the Istat census of 2001 it had 368 inhabitants.
