= Sebastiano Florigerio =

Italian painter (1510 – c. 1543)

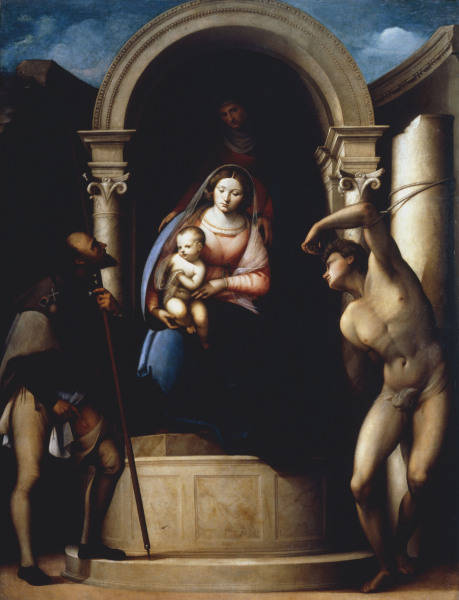
The Conception, between SS. Roch and Sebastian, ca. 1524–1525, now in the Gallerie dell'Accademia of Venice

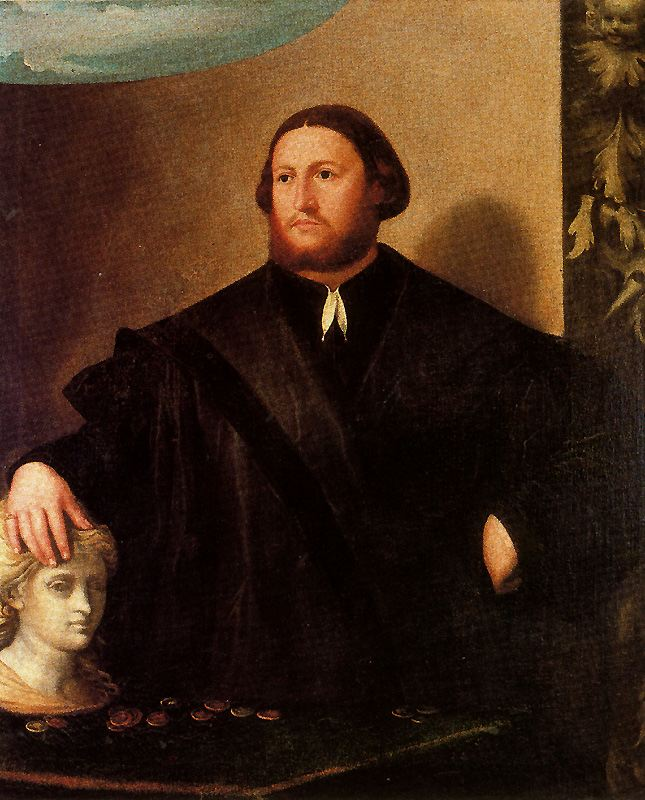
Portrait of Rafaello Grassi, 1530, now at the Uffizi in Florence

Sebastiano Florigerio was an Italian painter of the Renaissance period.

He was born in 1510 at Conegliano. He was a pupil of Pellegrino, and is thought to have married his daughter Aurelia. His first altar-piece was painted in 1525 for the church of Santa Maria di Villanuova, and in 1529 he painted, by commission, the altar-piece of St. George and the Dragon for the church of San Giorgio of Udine. Soon after this he went to Padua, where he painted the portal of the Palazzo del Capitano, and seems to have remained in that city until 1533. On his return to Udine he unhappily killed a man in a duel, and was obliged to flee for refuge to Cividale, which he was unable to leave until 1543. His death is believed to have occurred at Udine soon afterwards. The following are among his extant paintings:

- Oratory of San Bovo, Padua. Deposition from the Cross, with Saints and Pieta.
- Gallerie dell'Accademia, Venice. The Conception, between SS. Roch and Sebastian; Madonna and Child, with St. Augustine and St. Monica (painted for the Shoemakers' Guild at Udine); St. Francis, St. Anthony, and St. John the Baptist (painted for the Oratory of San Bovo, Padua); and Madonna and Child enthroned, with St. John, St. Anthony, and St. Monica (formerly in the Church of the Servi at Venice).
