= Mantignana =

- Frazione
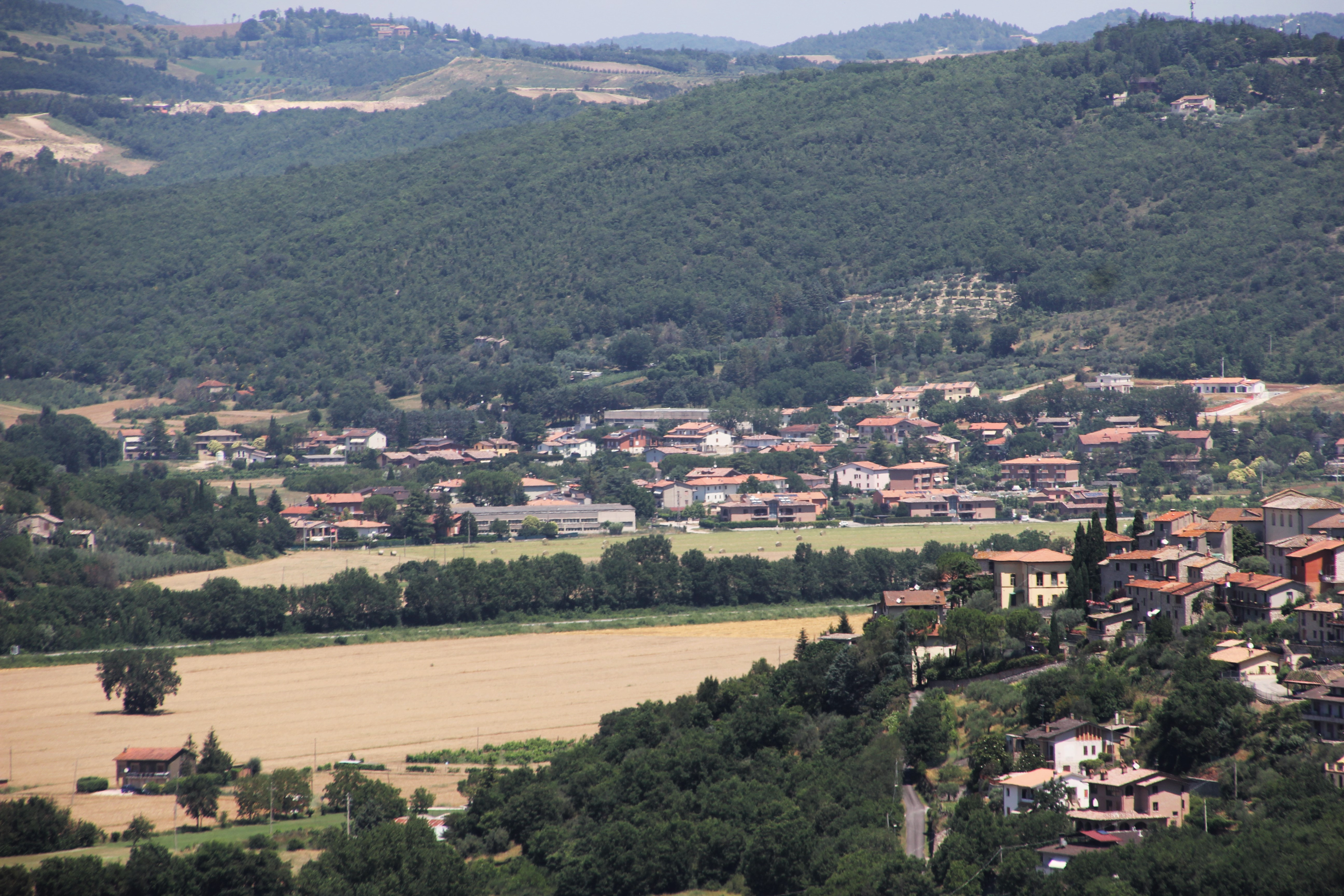

- Location of Mantignana in Italy
- Coordinates: 43°09′36″N 12°17′22″E
- Country: Italy
- Region: Umbria
- Province: Perugia
- Comune: Corciano
- Elevation: 252 m (827 ft)

Population (2001)
  - Total: 1,237
- Time zone: UTC+1 (CET)
  - Summer (DST): UTC+2 (CEST)
- Dialing code: 075

Mantignana is a frazione of the comune of Corciano in the Province of Perugia, Umbria, central Italy. It stands at an elevation of 252 metres above sea level. At the time of the Istat census of 2001 it had 1237 inhabitants.
