= Corciano =

- Comune
- Comune di Corciano
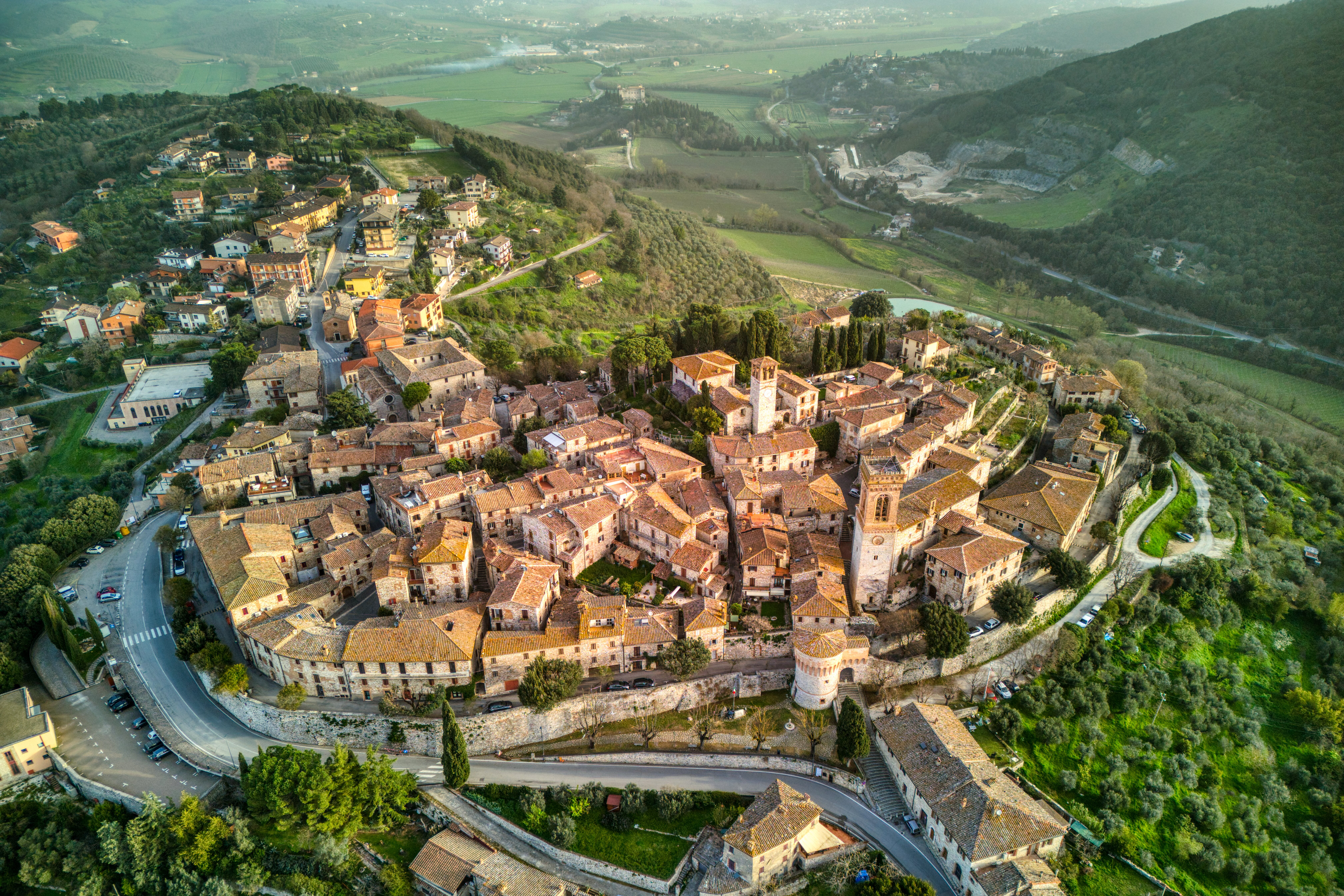
- View of Corciano

- Coat of arms

- Location within Italy Location within Umbria
- Coordinates: 43.12838°N 12.286218°E
- Country: Italy
- Region: Umbria
- Province: Perugia

Government
  - Mayor: Lorenzo Pierotti

Area
  - Total: 63.69 km^{2} (24.59 sq mi)
- Elevation: 408 m (1,339 ft)

Population (1 January 2025)
  - Total: 21,623
  - Density: 339.5/km^{2} (879.3/sq mi)
- Demonym: Corcianesi
- Time zone: UTC+1 (CET)
  - Summer (DST): UTC+2 (CEST)
- Postal code: 06073
- Dialing code: 075
- Patron saint: Saint Michael
- Saint day: May 8
- Website: Official website

Corciano is a comune (municipality) in the Province of Perugia in the Italian region Umbria, located about 8 km west of Perugia. As of 30 June 2025, it had a population of 21,539 and an area of 63.7 km^{2}.

Corciano borders the comuni of Magione and Perugia. It is one of I Borghi più belli d'Italia ("The most beautiful villages of Italy").

== Etymology ==
According to a local tradition reported by Adone Palmieri, the town was founded by Grano Razzenuo, the beloved son of Janus, from whom the name Core Giano ("heart of Janus") is said to derive.

A mythical founder Coragino, companion of Ulysses, is a medieval invention recounted in the 14th-century Conto di Corciano e di Perugia.

== History ==
=== Origins and Middle Ages ===
Little is known about the origins and early history of Corciano. A widespread legend holds that Corciano was an Umbrian city and that its founders were either a son of Janus or Corito, king of Cortona.

Corciano is first mentioned in 1136. Between the 11th and 12th centuries a fortified town was built, formed through the merging of communities from Palazzo and Pieve del Vescovo.

In the Middle Ages Corciano was one of the main centers of the Perugia countryside area. Seigneurial rights across the area belonged to the bishopric of Perugia, which drew income from woodland on the west side of Mount Malbe, but effective power was held by the comune of Perugia. From the first half of the 13th century Corciano was governed by a statute, although the statute is not extant.

In 1310 several stones taken from Todi by the Perugians were placed above Porta Santa Maria. In 1367 a certain Francesco Taragone of Corciano was among the seven noble reformers of the Republic and Senate of Rome. In 1416 Corciano resisted the attacks of Braccio Fortebraccio.

By the mid-15th century Corciano had fully staffed local institutions, but remained dependent on Perugia and was constrained by Perugia's control and the obligations imposed on it.

In 1424 Perugia sent the countryside captain, responsible for policing as well as the upkeep and defense of fortresses, the enforcement of statutory rules, tax collection, oversight of grain imports and peasant migration, and the administration of low-value justice.

=== Early Modern and Contemporary era ===
In 1540 the Salt War marked the end of Perugia's autonomy and Perugia was absorbed into the Papal States. After 1540 local political power in Corciano weakened and taxation increased, especially through the hearth subsidy. During the Wars of Castro of 1641–1649 Corciano was occupied for one month by the papal army and was later plundered, with negative consequences for the local economy.

In 1798–1799, during the period of the Roman Republic, Corciano formed part of the rural Perugia canton together with Castelvieto and Antria. In the Napoleonic period it became the first rural canton of the Perugia district in the Trasimeno Department, administered by a maire who chaired the council.

In 1814, after the fall of Napoleon, local government was restored under Papal State rules. In 1817 a Papal State list of governments and communities recorded Corciano as a municipality linked to the Delegation of Perugia. In 1827 Corciano was a podesteria under Perugia, and in 1833 it again appears as a municipality linked to Perugia.

In 1831 there was a brief attempt to join the uprisings. In 1849 Corciano supported the Roman Republic, including the lowering of the papal coat of arms and patriotic demonstrations, and similar actions took place in support of the 1859 Perugia uprising. In September 1860, following the arrival of Piedmontese troops, Corciano joined the Kingdom of Italy.

Corciano had a population of 4,501 inhabitants in 1895.

== Geography ==
Corciano is situated on a hill. The municipal area corresponds to the left-bank basin of the middle Caina stream and includes much of the Mount Malbe massif.

=== Subdivisions ===
The municipality includes the localities of Chiugiana-La Commenda, Comparati, Corciano, Corciano Vecchio, Fornaci Rinaldi, Il Rigo, La Trinità, Le Cupe, Mandrello-Palazzone, Mantignana, Mestigliano, Mezzopiano, Migiana, Palazza, Paletta, Pantanella, Ponte Forcione, San Carlo, San Pietro, Solomeo, Strozzacapponi, Taverne, Tegolaio, Valliano, Valpinza.

In 2021, 1,639 people lived in rural dispersed dwellings not assigned to any named locality. At the time, most of the population lived in Chiugiana-La Commenda (11,382), and Mantignana (2,167). The following localities had no recorded permanent residents: Ponte Cupe.

== Religion ==
=== Santa Maria Assunta ===
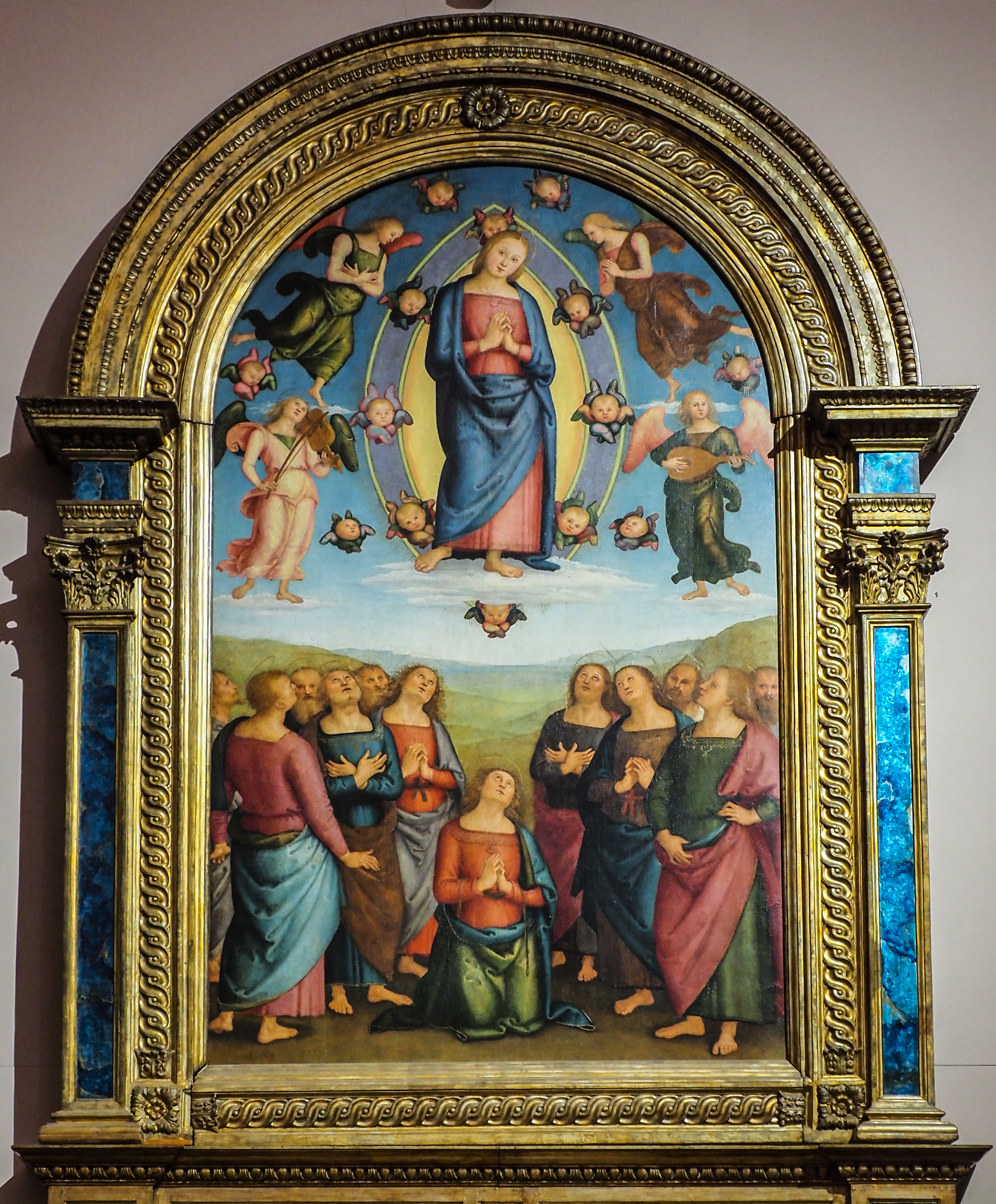
Assumption of Mary by Pietro Perugino, Church of Santa Maria Assunta

The church of Santa Maria Assunta stands near the main square of Corciano, and serves as the principal church. The building originated in the 13th century with a Gothic structure and was transformed into Neoclassical forms in 1870 according to a project by the architect Lardoni of Perugia. The bell tower was added in the same period using a nearby medieval stone tower with a quadrangular plan.

The earliest document concerning the church dates to 1254. Between 1332 and 1334 it assumed the title of pievana, acquiring a baptismal font and a funerary role. Inside the church is an altarpiece depicting the Assumption of Mary by Pietro Perugino, dated 1513 and placed above the high altar. Two lateral altars are dedicated to the Madonna of the Rosary and the Sacred Heart.

The church also preserves the Gonfalon of the Plague by Benedetto Bonfigli, originally made for the Church of Sant'Agostino and kept here since 1879; the painting includes a representation of Corciano and its castle. The funerary monument of Cardinal Rotelli, created in 1891 by the sculptor Luchetti of Perugia, is also located inside. Above the main entrance is a pipe organ built in 1863 by Angelo and Nicola Morettini of Perugia.

=== Sant'Agostino ===
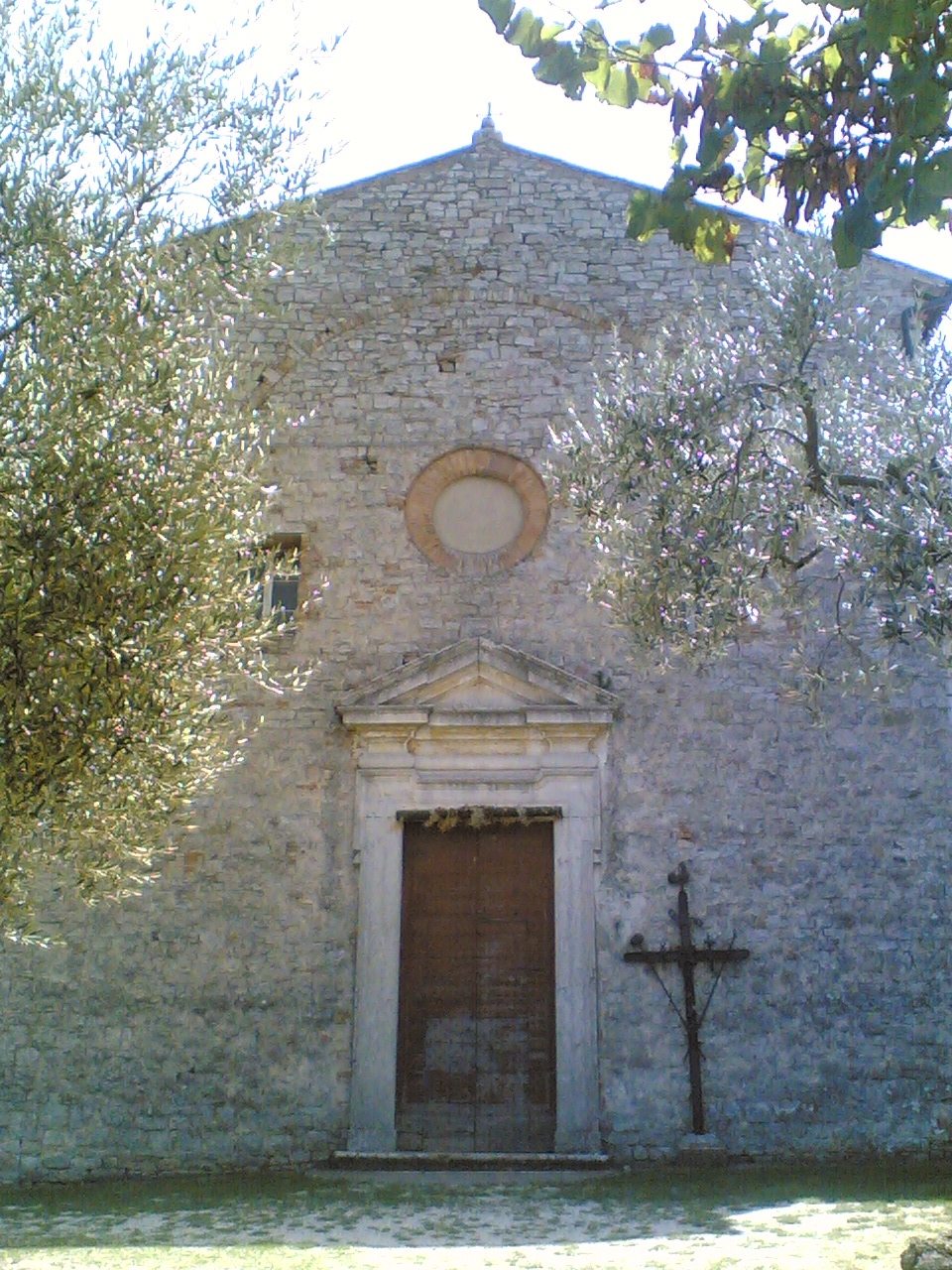
Church of Sant'Agostino

The church and former convent of Sant'Agostino stands on a hill just south of Corciano. The earliest document referring to the complex, belonging to the Order of Hermits of Saint Augustine, dates to 1334. Napoleon attempted to suppress the convent in 1811, but the restoration of papal rule allowed it to continue until its definitive suppression in 1860.

The exterior retains 14th-century characteristics. Built of limestone with a gabled façade, the structure has undergone alterations, including the replacement of the original Gothic windows with quadrangular openings and the substitution of the portal with an 18th-century entrance. Two blocked Gothic single-light windows remain visible on the sides, marked by brick courses indicating the original height of the building. The apse, now rectangular, was formerly semicircular according to a cadastral survey of 1729.

The interior lost its Gothic features through 18th- and 19th-century restorations. Shortly before the suppression of the convent in 1860, Father Raffaele Lauro added stucco decoration to the 18th-century altars. Three tomb slabs remain in the floor, reflecting the use of the church as a burial place.

=== San Francesco ===
The church of San Francesco contains several notable works. On the left wall at the first altar is a tempera panel depicting the Madonna and Child enthroned, attributed to Bonfigli and dating to the 15th century. At the second altar stands a wooden crucifix carved between the 15th and 16th centuries. In the apse are frescoes of the Umbrian school representing the Four Prophets. A large window with elaborate travertine carving reflects the period of the church's construction. A commemorative inscription recalls the visit of Pope Julius II.

=== Santa Maria ===
The church of Santa Maria stands among the most notable buildings of the town. On the eastern exterior wall are four frescoes of the Umbrian school dating to the 15th century. Inside the church is a panel by Perugino representing the Assumption. The predella of this painting originally included two sketches, the Nativity and the Annunciation, which are now preserved in the sacristy.

=== Other religious buildings ===
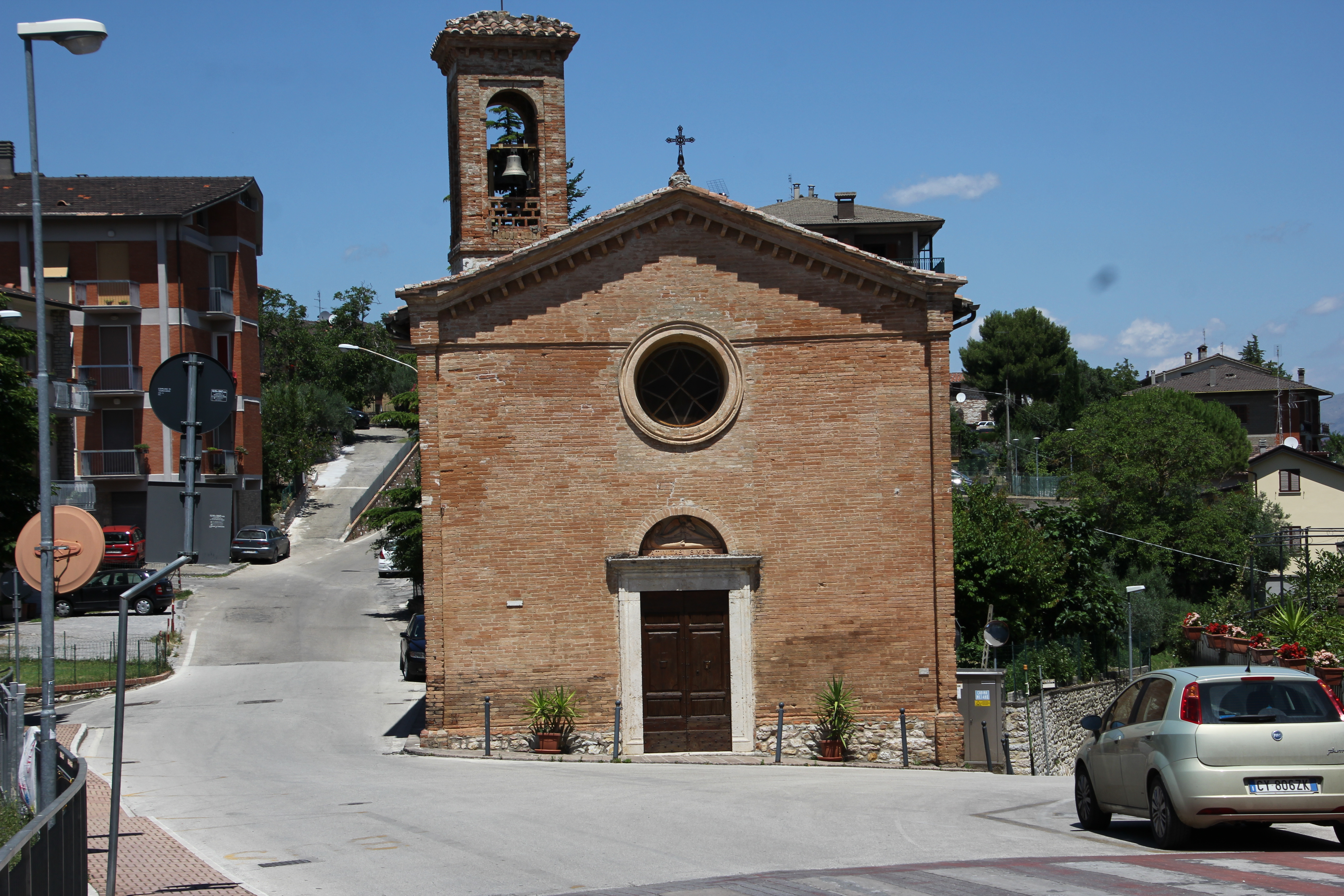
Madonna del Serraglio

The churches of Madonna del Borgo and Madonna del Serraglio are located near the settlement and preserve works of the Umbrian school from the 15th century.

The chapel of Madonna delle Grazie is a small vaulted chapel with a single altar and a circular fresco of the Virgin. It stands among acacia trees with a wide surrounding view.

The church of San Pietro is a small parish church in Taverne situated along the road connecting Perugia with Magione.

The church of San Giovanni Battista serves as the parish church of Castelvieto. It preserves a wooden crucifix regarded as miraculous. The chapel of the Annunziata stands outside Castelvieto.

The church of San Mariano serves the parish of San Mariano and contains an organ. A festival for the patron Saint Marian takes place on 30 April.

== Culture ==
=== Pieve del Vescovo ===
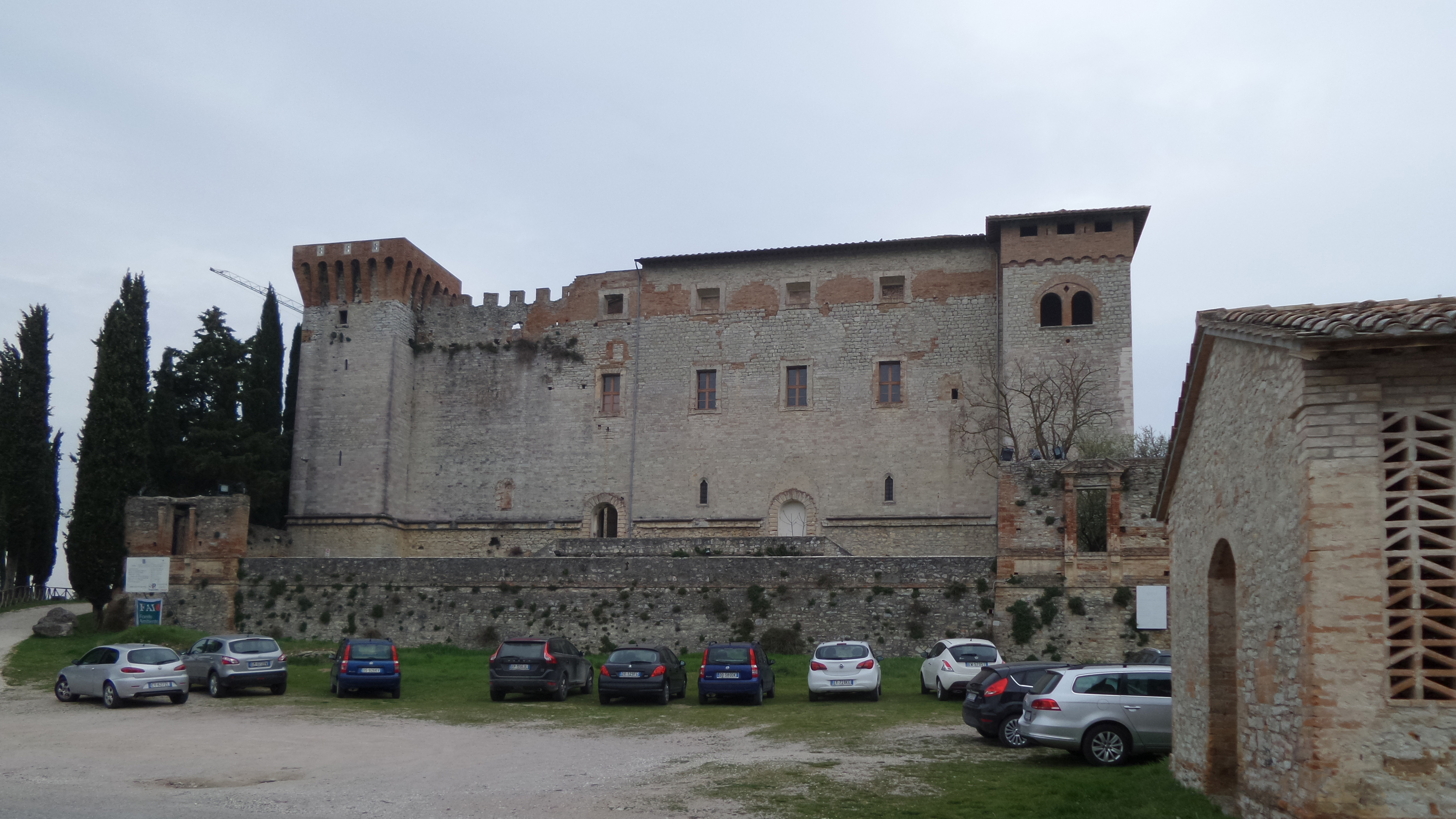
Pieve del Vescovo

The fortified complex known as Pieve del Vescovo stands on a hill overlooking the Caina valley about 1 kilometre (0.62 mi) from Corciano and has long belonged to the archiepiscopal estate of Perugia. The structure has a quadrangular plan with an internal courtyard and four corner towers.

The earliest record of the site dates to 1206, when a bull of Pope Innocent III placed the church of Saint John under the jurisdiction of the bishop of Perugia. In 1394 it was occupied by exiled Perugian nobles and in 1396 Biordo Michelotti fortified it with walls and towers. Between 1560 and 1570 Cardinal Fulvio I Della Corgna transformed the fortified complex into a residential palace following a design by the architect Galeazzo Alessi, with terraced gardens and a fish pond.

The interior contains large halls with frescoes by Taddeo Zuccari, a chapel dedicated to Saint John the Baptist, dungeons, and stables. In the second half of the 19th century it served as the residence of the archbishop of Perugia Gioacchino Pecci, later Pope Leo XIII. The building was damaged during the 19th century and again used as a military garrison during World War II. Since May 2005 the castle has housed the Museo Diocesano Diffuso of Pieve del Vescovo.

=== Antiquarium ===
Opened in 2009, the museum is organized into three sections: paleontological, prehistoric and protohistoric, and archaeological.

The paleontological section includes fossil remains of Mesozoic ammonites from Migiana, dating to the Lower Jurassic, and remains of Quaternary mammals from Ellera dating to the Lower Pleistocene. The prehistoric and protohistoric section is mainly composed of stone artefacts collected in various locations in the region and documents Umbria from the Upper Paleolithic to the Iron Age. Two cinerary urns from the latter period attest to the presence of the Villanovan culture in the territory between Perugia and Lake Trasimeno.

The section dedicated to classical archaeology includes reconstructions of two princely chariots discovered in April 1812 near Castel San Mariano in a tomb dating to the 6th century BC. Other materials relate to sanctuaries located along communication routes and hilltops.

The Hellenistic period is represented by finds from the Etruscan necropolises of Strozzacapponi and Fosso Rigo, including reconstructions of three burials with grave goods placed in their original positions. The section concludes with Roman-period objects from the Roman villa of Palazzo Grande and from two alla cappuccina tombs discovered in the area.

=== Palazzo Municipale ===
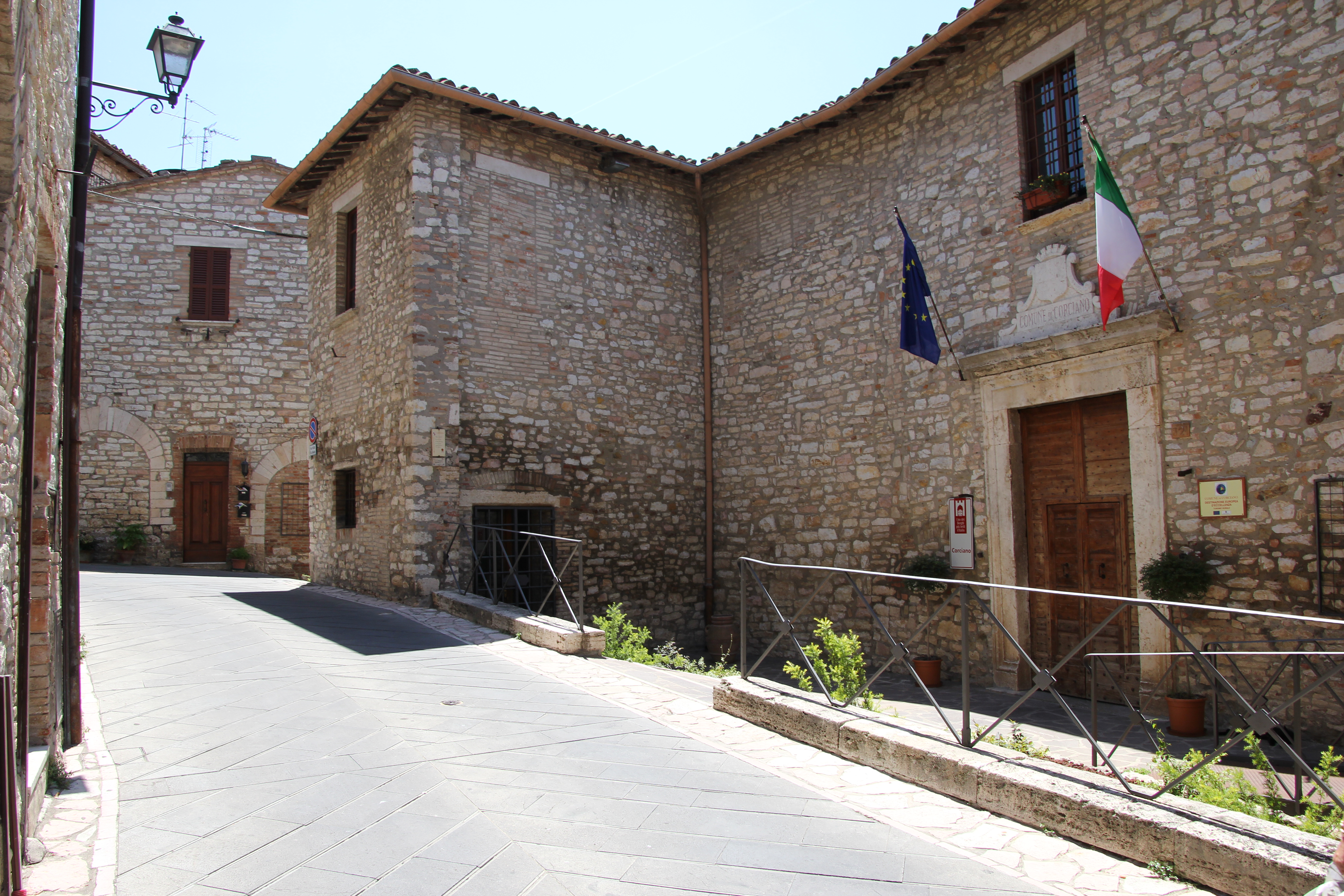
Palazzo Municipale

The Palazzo Municipale was built around the mid-16th century by the Dukes Della Corgna after the election of Pope Julius III in 1550. The palace later passed through several owners, including the Doni family, Innocenzo Massini, Count Ungaro Oddi, and the Innamorati family. The municipal administration acquired the building in 1887 from Luigi Innamorati.

The palace was constructed over medieval houses, traces of which remain visible around the exterior perimeter. The façade has a recessed central section with two projecting lateral sections. The building has three floors: the lower levels originally contained storage rooms and stables, the upper floor served as the main reception level with rooms decorated with frescoes by Salvio Savini, and the top floor contained the private apartments.

=== Museo della Casa Contadina ===
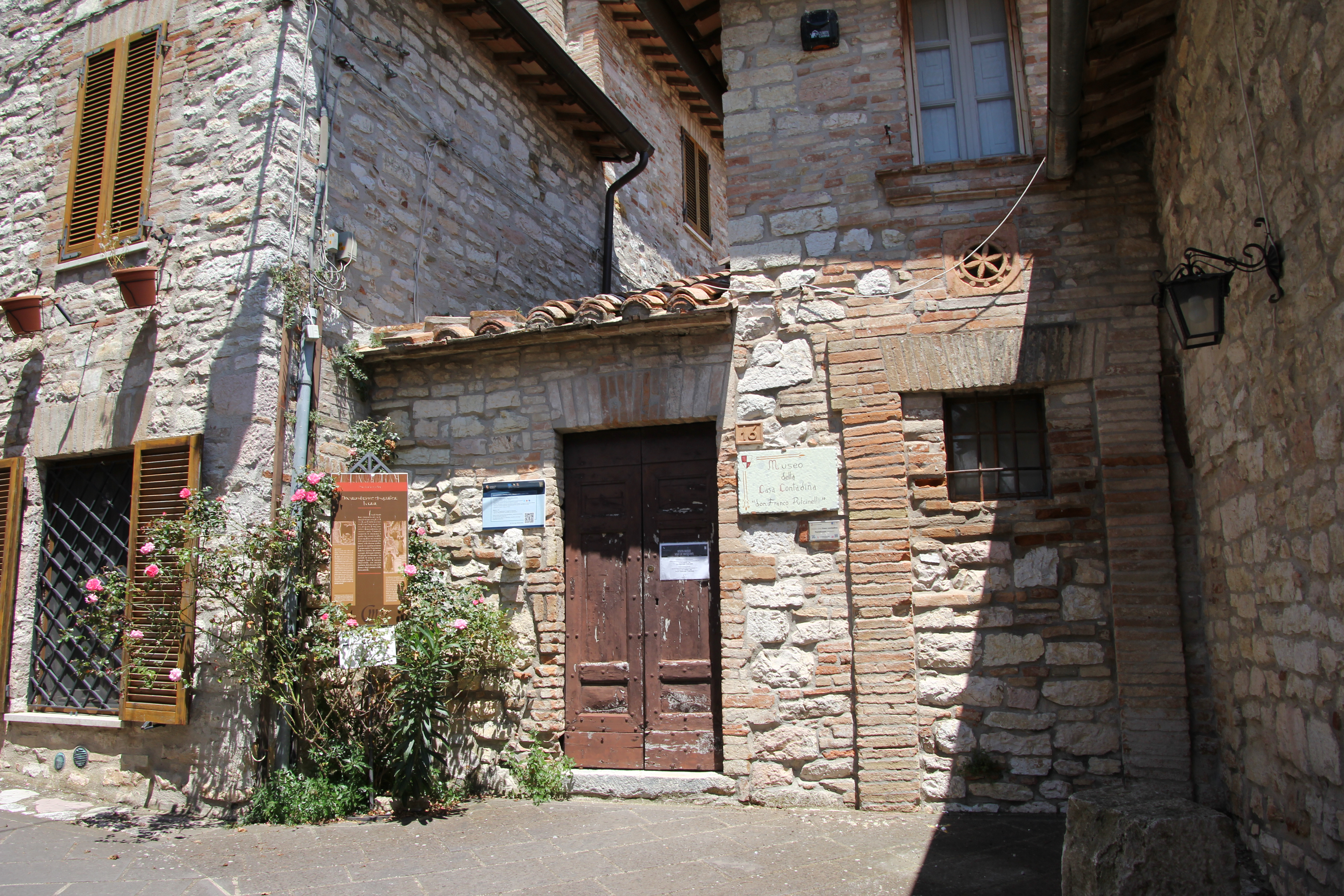
Museo della casa contadina

The Museo della Casa Contadina was founded in 1976 through the initiative of local residents and the local Pro Loco, who collected objects connected with agricultural work and domestic and artisanal activities. Donations later expanded the collection.

The museum documents the rural context and subsistence economy associated with the agricultural life of Corciano. The exhibition spaces reconstruct the rooms of a traditional rural house, including the stable cellar, the granary, the kitchen, and the bedroom.

Objects displayed include agricultural tools and domestic items such as barrels, baskets, flasks, a wooden loom with spinning and weaving implements, and utensils associated with food preparation and household work. The bedroom contains a metal bed with a mattress filled with leaves and various domestic furnishings. Photographs and devotional images contribute to the reconstruction of the social and religious environment of the 19th-century rural community.

=== Necropolis of Strozzacapponi ===
The necropolis of Strozzacapponi consists of numerous tombs arranged according to a planned layout. The tombs have a dromos with steps leading to an entrance closed by a large stone slab. Inside, benches along three sides held urns or ceramic vessels containing cremated remains and grave goods.

The burial rite was cremation, common in the territory of Perugia during the Hellenistic period. The ashes of the deceased were placed in travertine urns or ceramic vessels, some bearing sculpted decoration and inscriptions with the name of the deceased. The necropolis was used between the 3rd and the 1st century BC and was associated with a settlement connected to travertine quarrying in the nearby area of Santa Sabina. It forms part of a broader archaeological and naturalistic route that also includes the necropolis of Fosso Rigo.

=== Other heritage sites ===
The Palazzo del Capitano del Popolo, also called the Palazzo del Capitano del Contado, was built in the 15th century. It served as the residence of the Captain of the Contado, the official sent by the city of Perugia to administer its dependent territories. Its brick façade includes two large stone portals and four windows.

The Palazzo dei Priori e della Mercanzia stands along the main street of Corciano. The façade includes four arches, three of which are now closed, marking the former loggia where the market was held. On the upper floor is a large hall used for public assemblies.

Within the territory stands the villa known as Colle del Cardinale, situated near Mantignana. The villa contains a bath entirely of marble.

== Notable people ==
Corciano is associated with the painter Pompeo Cocchi, celebrated among the pupils of Pietro Perugino; with Giuseppe Innamorati, renowned in the science of notarial practice and author of 12,000 notarial acts; and with the canon Don Luigi Mattioli.

Other notable people connected to Corciano include:

- Nicola Danzetta (Corciano, 1820 – Perugia, 1895), patriot and politician.
- Luigi Rotelli (Corciano, 1833 – Roma, 1891), cardinal of the Catholic Church.
- Artemio Giovagnoni (Perugia, 1922 – Corciano, 2007), sculptor, medallion maker, playwright, writer and poet.
- Franco Venanti (Perugia, 1930), painter, founder, together with his brother Luciano of the "Agosto corcianese" Festival.
- Carlo Brugnami (Corciano, 1938), cyclist.
