= Comparati =

- Frazione
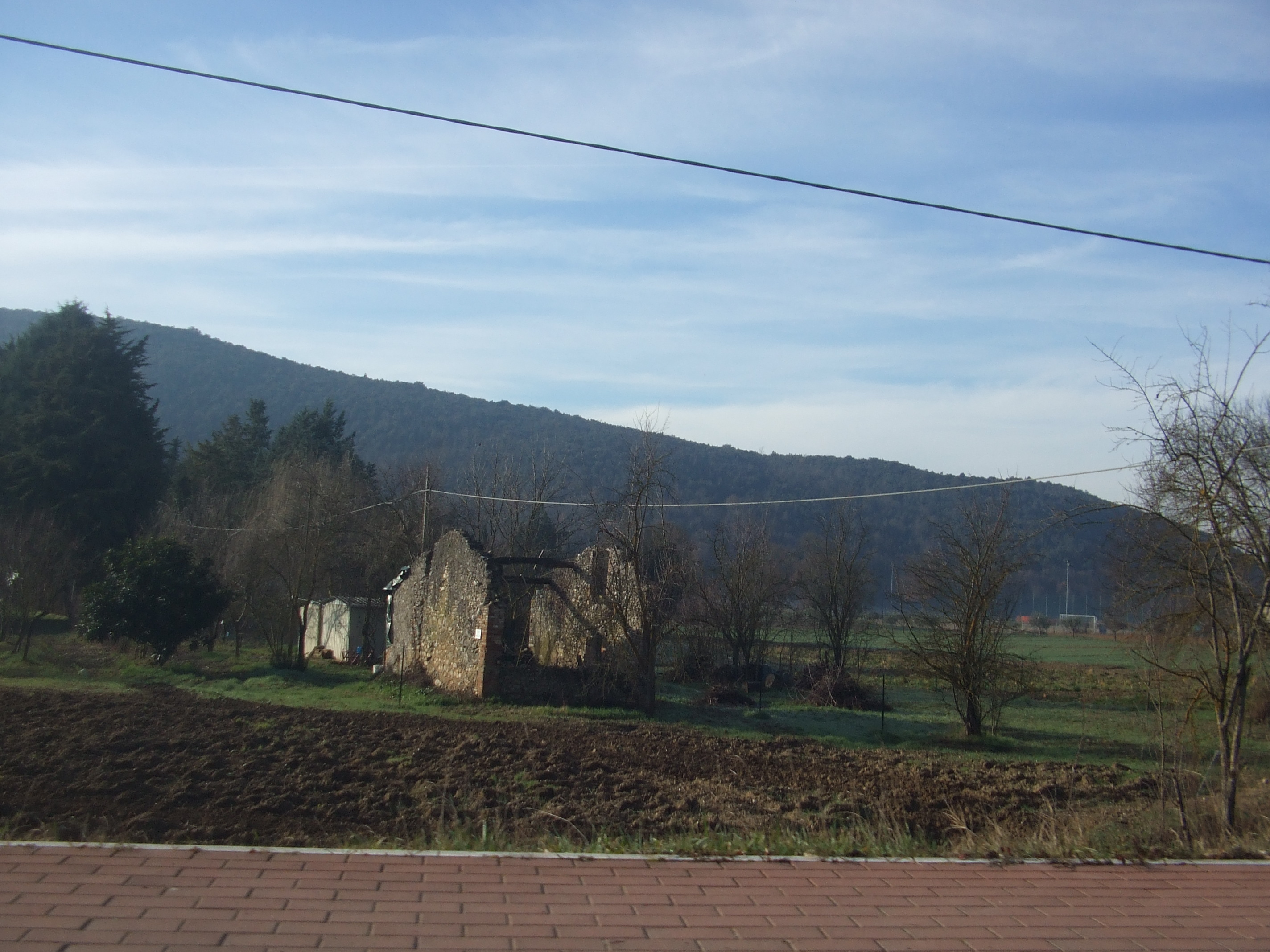

- Location of Comparati in Italy
- Coordinates: 43°09′34″N 12°19′24″E
- Country: Italy
- Region: Umbria
- Province: Perugia
- Comune: Corciano
- Elevation: 270 m (890 ft)

Population (2001)
  - Total: 461
- Time zone: UTC+1 (CET)
  - Summer (DST): UTC+2 (CEST)
- Dialing code: 075

Comparati is a frazione of the comune of Corciano in the Province of Perugia, Umbria, central Italy. It stands at an elevation of 270 metres above sea level. At the time of the Istat census of 2001 it had 461 inhabitants.
