= Pantanella =

- Frazione
- Location of Pantanella in Italy
- Coordinates: 43°06′31″N 12°15′35″E
- Country: Italy
- Region: Umbria
- Province: Perugia
- Comune: Corciano
- Elevation: 232 m (761 ft)

Population (2001)
  - Total: 269
- Time zone: UTC+1 (CET)
  - Summer (DST): UTC+2 (CEST)
- Dialing code: 075

Pantanella is a zone of Castelvieto, frazione of the comune of Corciano in the Province of Perugia, Umbria, central Italy. It stands at an elevation of 232 metres above sea level. At the time of the Istat census of 2001 Castelvieto had 269 inhabitants.
