= Passignano sul Trasimeno =

- Comune
- Comune di Passignano sul Trasimeno
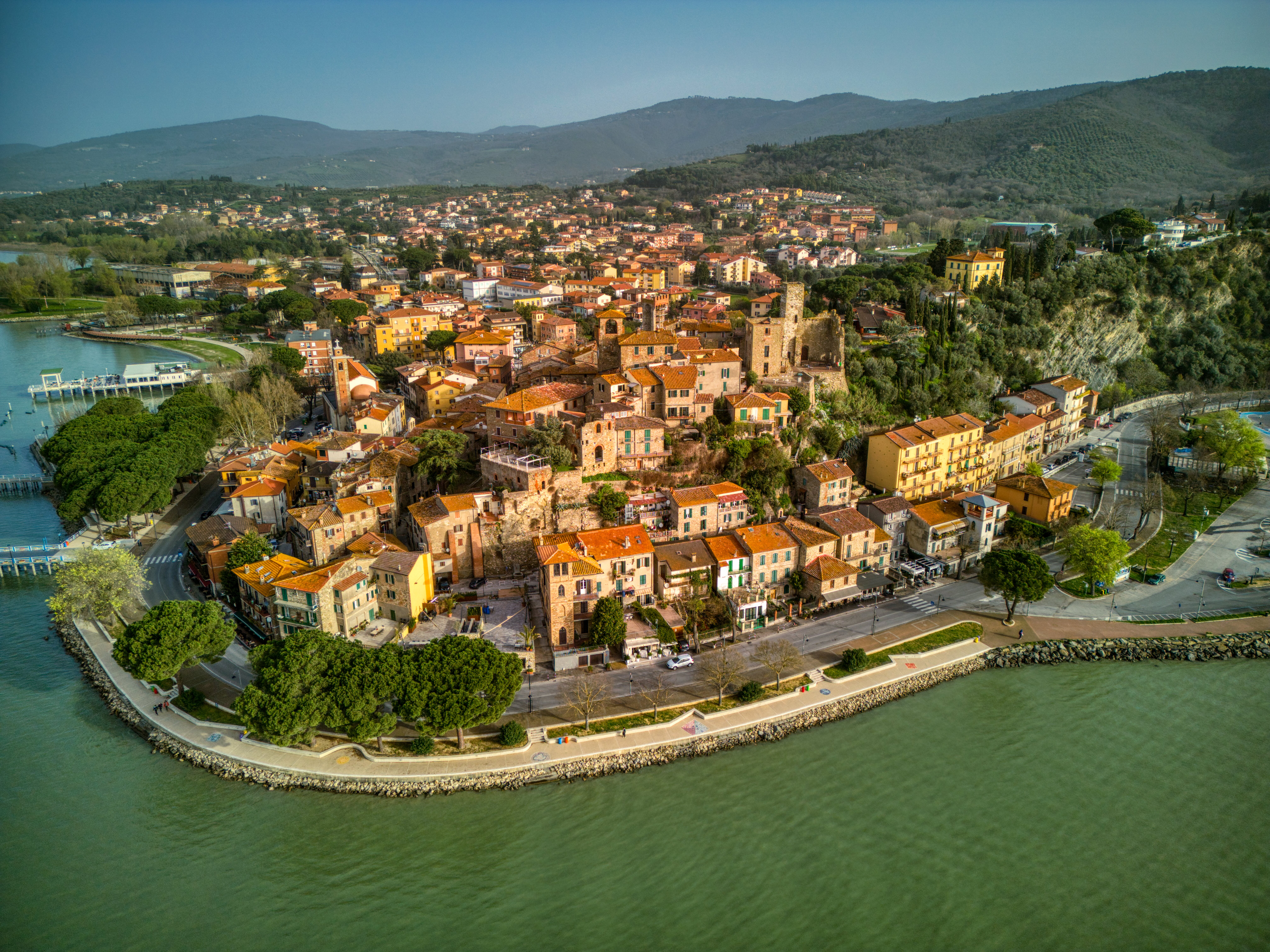
- View of Passignano sul Trasimeno

- Coat of arms

- Location within Italy Location within Umbria
- Coordinates: 43.184842°N 12.136633°E
- Country: Italy
- Region: Umbria
- Province: Perugia (PG)

Government
  - Mayor: Claudio Bellaveglia

Area
  - Total: 81.1 km^{2} (31.3 sq mi)
- Elevation: 289 m (948 ft)

Population (1 January 2025)
  - Total: 5,705
  - Density: 70.3/km^{2} (182/sq mi)
- Demonym: Passignanesi
- Time zone: UTC+1 (CET)
  - Summer (DST): UTC+2 (CEST)
- Postal code: 06065
- Dialing code: 075
- Patron saint: St. Christopher
- Saint day: July 25
- Website: Official website

Passignano sul Trasimeno is a comune (municipality) in the Province of Perugia in the Italian region of Umbria, located about 20 km northwest of Perugia. It is one of I Borghi più belli d'Italia ("The most beautiful villages of Italy").

== Etymology ==
The name derives either from Passinianum, meaning "place of the pass", or possibly derived from a landowner named Passinius or Passenius.

== History ==
The earliest inhabitants of the area were the Umbri, later displaced by the Etruscans beyond the Tiber. In the Roman period the settlement functioned as a military outpost, probably centered on a watchtower controlling the northern pass and forming a link between northern and central Italy.

In 917 Passignano was granted as a fief by Berengar I to Marquis Uguccione II Bourbon del Monte. In 1073 John Gualbert, founder of the Vallombrosan order, died there. During the 12th century it came under the authority of Perugia and suffered frequent devastation in conflicts involving Arezzo and Florence. The settlement was sacked and burned by Arezzo in 1334 and later restored in 1396.

Subjugation by Braccio Fortebraccio occurred in 1416. Between 1479 and 1488 it was occupied by Florence before returning to Perugia. Until 1520 it remained under the rule of the Baglioni family, followed by control of the Oddi and Della Corgna families from 1520 to 1643, when it passed to the Grand Duchy of Tuscany.

In 1600 the waters of Lake Trasimeno caused sizeable destruction.

During the French period it served as the seat of a canton. In 1817 it became the seat of a governor within the Delegation of Perugia, with jurisdiction over Bastia Corgna, Fratta Corgna, Isola Maggiore and Monteruffiano, and with Castel Rigone as a dependency. A reorganization in 1827 reduced it to a lower-level jurisdiction under Magione, including Bastia Corgna, San Damiano, Monteruffiano, San Donato and San Vito, again with Castel Rigone as a dependency.

In the mid-19th century Passignano had a population of 1,904 inhabitants, of whom 645 lived in the town and 1,258 in the countryside. It was first designated as a municipality in 1857. Annexation to the Kingdom of Italy followed in 1860.

In 1904 the first navigation company on Lake Trasimeno was established, providing regular connections with lakeside towns and the islands. Between 1916 and 1922 a seaplane pilot training school operated there; some of its trainees later took part in the 1931 transatlantic flight.

The municipality adopted the name Passignano sul Trasimeno in 1918.

== Geography ==
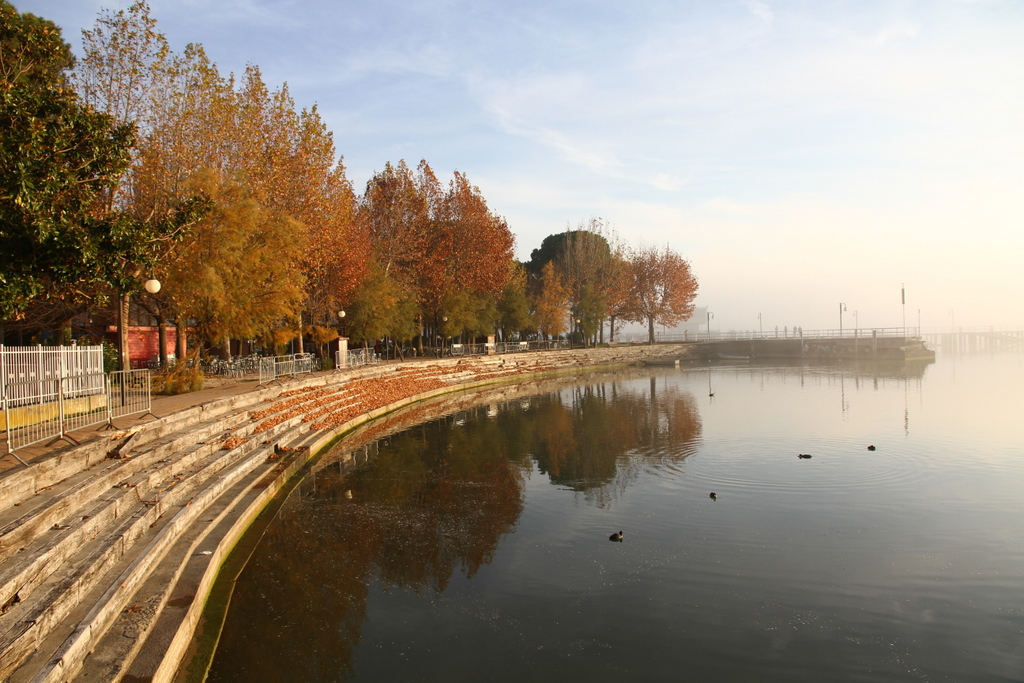
Passignano sul Trasimeno by Lake Trasimeno

Passignano lies on the shores of Lake Trasimeno, forming an almost peninsular settlement separated from the lake only by the road connecting Perugia to Tuscany. The area is partly flat, with a portion extending onto the slopes of low Apennine hills cultivated with olive trees, where aloe also grows among the rocks.

The locality of Monte Ruffano consisted of a tower-like structure on an elevated height, while Fratta Cornia formed another rural fraction. Castel Rigone is also mentioned as an appurtenance.

The climate was noted as very hot in summer, with high humidity in other seasons.

=== Subdivisions ===
The municipality includes the localities of Castel Rigone, Passignano sul Trasimeno, San Donato, San Vito.

In 2021, 693 people lived in rural dispersed dwellings not assigned to any named locality. At the time, the most populous locality was Passignano proper (4,463).

== Economy ==
In the 19th century the local economy was based primarily on fishing and agriculture. The territory produced abundant crops, especially olives. The town benefited from passing travelers due to its position along a main route.

=== Industry ===
Passignano was home to a historic Italian airplane factory, the SAI Ambrosini, now abandoned as an industrial center but still used as an association center. Its buildings still exist near the Passignano sul Trasimeno railway station.

Aircraft were tested at Eleuteri airport, only a few kilometers away from the factory. SAI was involved mainly with Macchi during World War II, although Eleuteri was also used as a test center for the Ambrosini SS.4.

== Religion and culture ==
=== Religious buildings ===
The main parish church within the town is San Bernardino. Other churches include Santa Maria dei Servi, built in 1482 and equipped with an organ, and the rural church of Madonna dell'Oliveto, located about 1 mile (1.6 km) away. The Capuchin convent, situated in an elevated position, was established in 1564.

In the church of San Bernardino there is a finely worked metal processional cross, formerly adorned with enamels. An inscription records that it was commissioned in 1463 by Lodovico di Giovanni, parish priest of San Cristoforo.

Near the town stands the church of the Madonna dell'Olivo, built in the 16th century. Its interior contains sculptures by Mariotto Radi, a native of Cortona, and by Ascanio da Cortona, as well as paintings including a fresco of the Virgin and Child enthroned attributed to Bonfigli, and works by Ciburri (depicting Saint Charles Borromeo), Virgilio Nucci (the Virgin enthroned with Child, Saint Nicholas and Saint Francis), and Salvini (the Annunciation).

In the surrounding area is also the church of San Cristoforo, which preserves frescoes by followers of the school of Giotto.

The sanctuary of Madonna dei Miracoli is located in Castel Rigone, a frazione of Passignano.

=== La Rocca ===
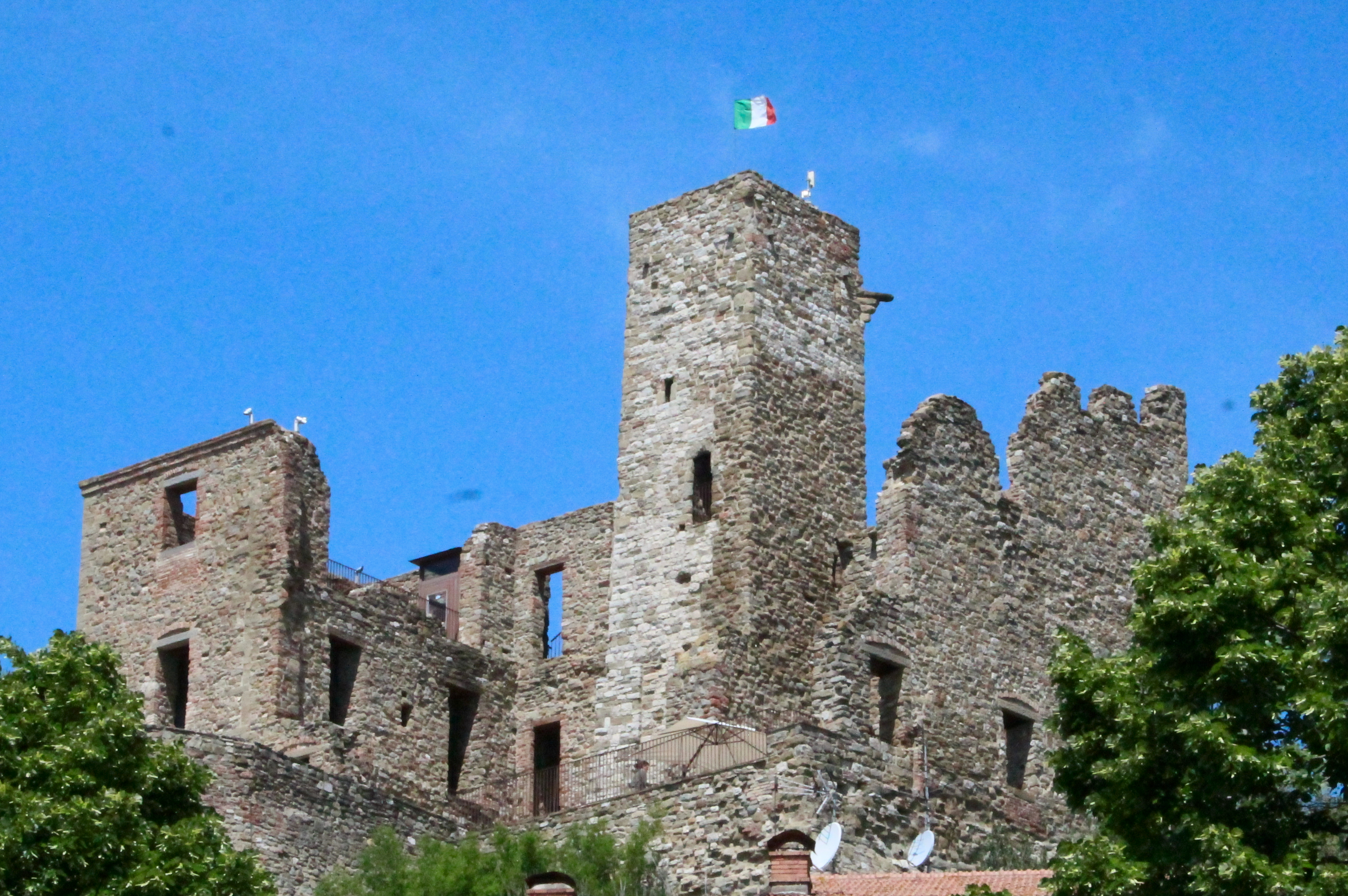
Rocca of Passignano

The Rocca of Passignano stands within the town, slightly above the area that later developed along the lake shore. It now consists of the ruins of the original structure. What remains includes square walls, a partly destroyed large tower, and the northern part of the medieval castle, with a triangular tower. A network of narrow lanes climbs within the historic center and reflects the former internal routes of the castle.

Its origins are traced to the Lombard period (5th-6th century), while the square walls are placed between 820 and 850 and are attributed to the marquises of Tuscany, who held it until the 11th century. In 1187 the Rocca passed to the chapter of the Cathedral of San Lorenzo (Perugia). Soon after, in 1202, enlargement works began, and it was transformed into a fortified castle intended to defend Perugian territories on the Tuscan side; the houses around it were incorporated within the walls. Throughout the Middle Ages the castle changed owners repeatedly and suffered sackings and raids. After the war between the Duchy of Tuscany and the Papal State in 1479, its appearance underwent further changes, with many towers destroyed and numerous dwellings damaged.

In the Renaissance period there were clashes over control of the stronghold among the Della Corgna, the Baglioni, and the Degli Oddi families. It was also involved in the Wars of Castro. In 1778 part of the complex was demolished to allow better carriage transit. Between 1816 and 1817 the Papal Government ordered the demolition of the entire complex, directing that materials from the towers and walls be used to raise the street level, in response to repeated flooding from lake overflows that inundated and damaged lakeside houses.

=== Sports ===
Scuderia Coloni, a former Formula 1 and GP2 Series racing team which currently organizes the Auto GP Series, is located in Passignano sul Trasimeno.

== Notable people ==
Notable people born in Passignano include fashion entrepreneur Brunello Cucinelli, founder of the luxury cashmere brand. Among others are also Cesare Cesarini, a composer and orchestra conductor, and Gastone Monaldi, an actor and playwright associated with early 20th-century Romanesco theatre, Ottavio Posta, a Catholic priest recognised as Righteous Among the Nations for aiding Jews during the Holocaust, and Stefano Bellaveglia, a banker who served as vice president of Monte dei Paschi di Siena.

Among the principal families recorded in the 19th century are the Michelangeli, Boattini, Gaggi, Balducci, and Testoni.
