= Pellegrino da San Daniele =

Italian painter

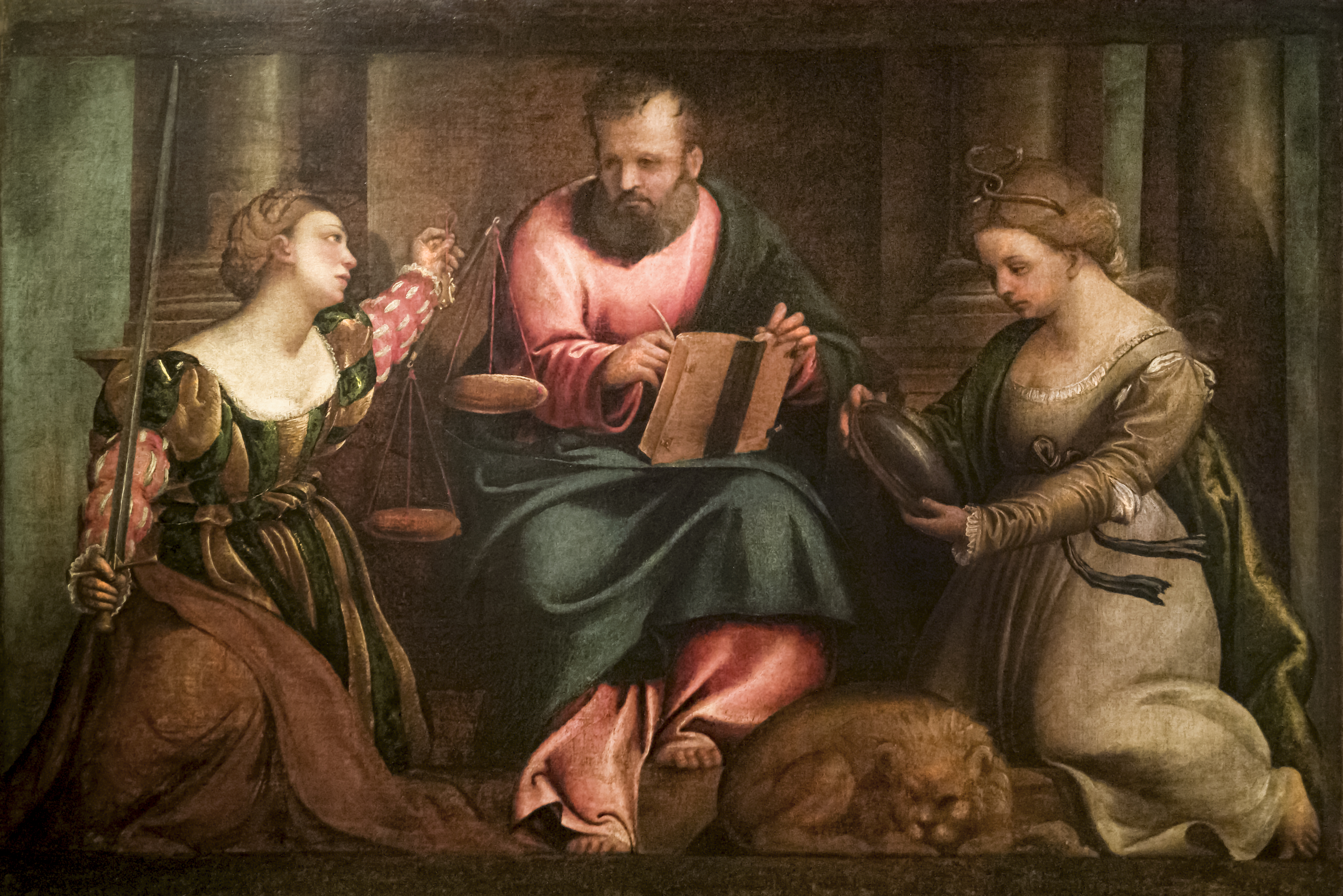
San Marco between Justice and Prudence Ca' Rezzonico

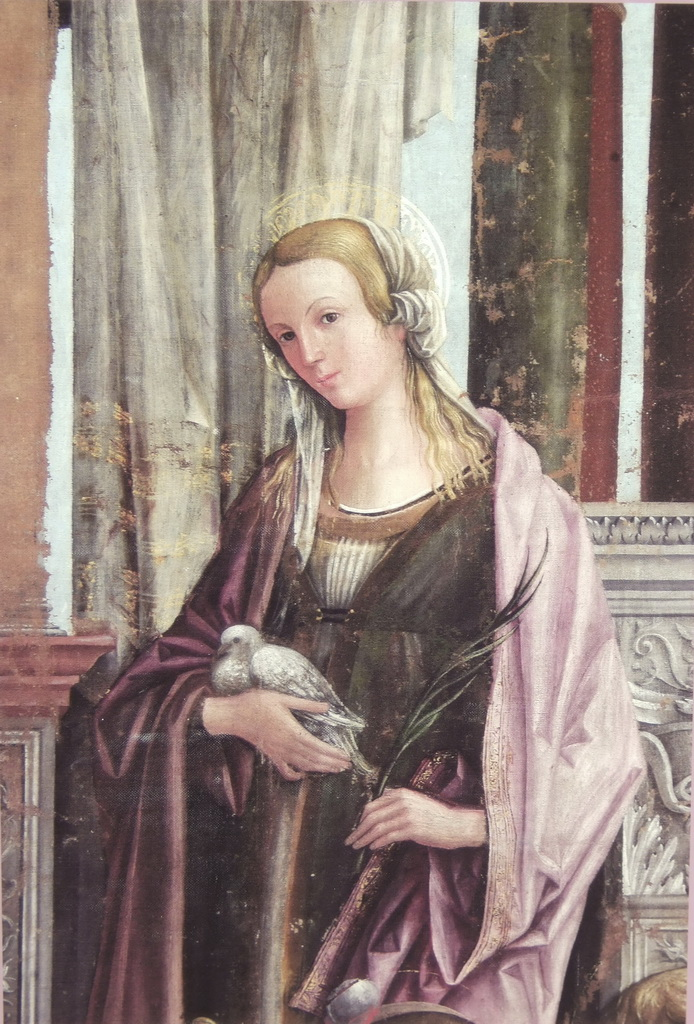
Santa Colomba in the church of Osoppo, Udine

Pellegrino da San Daniele (1467–1547) was an Italian painter in the late-Quattrocento and Renaissance styles, active in the Friulian region.

Born at San Daniele del Friuli, he is also known as Martino da Udine. He completed frescoes in the church of San Antonio in the town of San Daniele. He later was strongly influenced by Il Pordenone. Among his pupils were Luca Monverde, Girolamo da Udine, Francesco Floriani and Sebastiano Florigerio.

== Sources ==
- Freedberg, Sydney J. (1993). Pelican History of Art (ed.). Painting in Italy, 1500-1600 (Penguin Books Ltd ed.). p. 356.
