= Luigi Rotelli =

Italian prelate

His Eminence Luigi Rotelli
- Apostolic Nuncio Emeritus to France
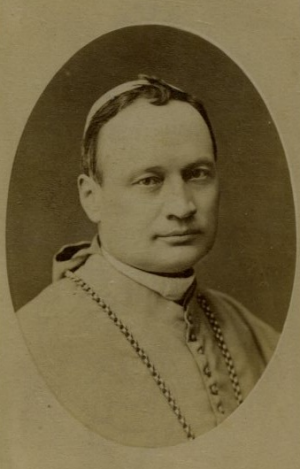
- Church: Roman Catholic Church
- Appointed: 23 May 1887
- Term ended: 1 June 1891
- Predecessor: Pier Francesco Meglia
- Successor: Benedetto Lorenzelli
- Previous posts: Bishop of Montefiascone (1878-82); Titular Archbishop of Pharsalus (1882-91); Vicar Apostolic of Constantinopole (1883-87)

Orders
- Ordination: 20 December 1856
- Consecration: 21 July 1878 by Raffaele Monaco La Valletta
- Created cardinal: 1 June 1891 by Pope Leo XIII
- Rank: Cardinal-Priest

Personal details
- Born: Luigi Rotelli; 26 July 1833 Corciano, Umbria, Papal States
- Died: 15 September 1891 (aged 58) Rome, Kingdom of Italy
- Buried: Campo Verano
- Parents: Candido Rotelli; Sabina Melle
- Education: University of Perugia

Luigi Rotelli (26 July 1833 – 15 September 1891) was an Italian prelate of the Catholic Church who was a bishop and a diplomat in the service of the Holy See. He was made a cardinal in June 1891, just weeks before his death.

== Biography ==
Luigi Rotelli (sometimes rendered "Roteili") was born on 26 July 1833 on Corciano in Umbria. He earned a doctorate in theology at the University of Perugia on 19 July 1857; one of his teachers was Giuseppe Pecci, brother of the future Pope Leo XIII, who was then Bishop of Perugia. Rotelli was ordained a priest on 20 December 1856.

In the diocese of Perugia, professor of its seminary, 1857–1878; canon of the cathedral chapter, 16 August 1863; prosynodal examiner, 1870; archdeacon of the cathedral chapter, 15 May 1877.

On 15 July 1878, Pope Leo XIII appointed him bishop of Montefiascone. He received his episcopal consecration on 21 July 1878 from Cardinal Raffaele Monaco La Valletta.

He was transferred to the titular see of Pharsala on 22 December 1882 and on 26 January 1883 named apostolic delegate in Constantinople and apostolic vicar of Constantinople. (Note: Both those titles–delegate and vicar–were ascribed to him when his successor in Montefiascone was appointed on 15 March 1883.)

He was named Nuncio to France on 23 May 1887.

Pope Leo made him a cardinal of the order of cardinal priests on 1 June 1891. He received his red biretta from French President Sadi Carnot, but was never invested by the pope with the other symbols of his new rank, nor assigned a titular church.

Rotelli died after a brief bout of typhoid fever on 15 September 1891. He was buried Rome's Campo Verano cemetery.

Honors

- The Grand Cross of Medjdieh from the Ottoman sultan
- The Order of the Lion and the Sun from the Shah of Persia
- France awarded him the Grand Cross of the Legion of Honor.
