= Mestigliano =

- Frazione
- Location of Mestigliano in Italy
- Coordinates: 43°03′54″N 12°18′04″E
- Country: Italy
- Region: Umbria
- Province: Perugia
- Comune: Corciano
- Elevation: 235 m (771 ft)

Population (2001)
  - Total: 355
- Time zone: UTC+1 (CET)
  - Summer (DST): UTC+2 (CEST)
- Dialing code: 075

Mestigliano is a frazione of the comune of Corciano in the Province of Perugia, Umbria, central Italy. It stands at an elevation of 235 metres above sea level. At the time of the Istat census of 2001 it had 355 inhabitants.
