= Pompeo Cocchi =

Italian painter

Pompeo Cocchi di Pier Gentile (active 1523) was an Italian painter of the Renaissance period, active in Umbria.

== Biography ==
Born in Corciano, he was a pupil of the painter Pietro Perugino. He was admitted into the guild of painters in 1523. One of his pupils was Orsino Carota.
