= Chiugiana-La Commenda =

- Frazione
- Location of Chiugiana-La Commenda in Italy
- Coordinates: 43°06′20″N 12°18′50″E
- Country: Italy
- Region: Umbria
- Province: Perugia
- Comune: Corciano
- Elevation: 284 m (932 ft)

Population (2001)
  - Total: 6,427
- Time zone: UTC+1 (CET)
  - Summer (DST): UTC+2 (CEST)
- Dialing code: 075

Chiugiana-La Commenda is a frazione of the comune of Corciano in the Province of Perugia, Umbria, central Italy. It stands at an elevation of 284 metres (932 ft) above sea level. At the time of the Istat census of 2001 it had 6427 inhabitants.
