= Solomeo =

- Frazione
- Aerial view of Solomeo

- Location of Solomeo in Italy
- Coordinates: 43°04′59″N 12°16′39″E
- Country: Italy
- Region: Umbria
- Province: Perugia
- Comune: Corciano
- Elevation: 273 m (896 ft)

Population (2021)
  - Total: 711
- Time zone: UTC+1 (CET)
  - Summer (DST): UTC+2 (CEST)
- Dialing code: 075

Solomeo is a frazione of the comune of Corciano in the Province of Perugia, Umbria, central Italy. It stands at an elevation of 273 metres above sea level.

Solomeo is about 9 km south of the city of Corciano. The village is centered mainly on the hill top and the surrounding plain below is irrigated by the waters of the stream Caina.

== History ==
The history of Solomeo is reportedly sparsely documented, but the settlement does have a precise foundation date. On 7 September 1391 the magistracy of Perugia appointed Meo di Giovanni di Nicola Galassi and Cristoforo di Pietro Tanoli to have the fortress of Solomeo built in the Perugian countryside near Meo's palace. They were authorized to compel nearby inhabitants to work on the construction, under penalty of imprisonment.

After Solomeo was fortified, the parishes of Mandoleto and Montefrondoso were united to it. In 1399, after each of those parishes in turn built its own small fortress, they obtained permission to live independently of Solomeo.

In 1402 Solomeo was taken by force, sacked, and heavily damaged by papal Florentine troops, but in the same year it was recovered by Perugian townspeople. Later, unwilling to remain subject to the Perugian populace, it rebelled, and the magistrates of Perugia charged Ser Coluccio di Arquata, a city official, with taking severe measures against the people of Solomeo.

The parish church of San Bartolomeo was a dependency of the cathedral of San Lorenzo. The settlement continued to grow: on 15 December 1503 Perugia ordered the construction of a well with contributions from the city, and in 1578 permission was requested to build new houses within an enclosure outside the settlement; this was granted on condition that the price of the land would be spent to the advantage of Perugia.

In the mid-19th century, Soloméo had 272 inhabitants.

At the time of the Istat census of 2001 it had 436 inhabitants

Today Solomeo has been largely restored by Brunello Cucinelli.

== Religion and culture ==
=== Religious buildings ===
The church of San Bartolomeo features a vaulted interior, three altars, an organ, and three bells. Saint Bartholomew is the patron saint. It was rebuilt in 1830, and a small square was laid out in front of it.

The church was built to a design by the architect Biscarini and contains paintings by the Mazzerioli brothers of Perugia. The choir, five altars, the organ, and a tabernacle made by the artist Caselli to a design by the architect Murena, dating to around 1782, were transferred from the church adjacent to the University of Perugia. The tabernacle is included in a special inventory compiled in August 1810 by the Commission for the conservation of art objects of the Department of Trasimeno.

The Madonna delle Grazie is a small vaulted church with a single altar and a circular fresco of the Virgin. It stands among acacia trees with an open outlook.

=== Other cultural heritage ===
In the cemetery there is a marble monument of the Gallenga-Stuart family, formed by a large urn with a winged angel in a mourning pose, by Giulio Monteverde. It was made in Rome and erected in 1882. Among those buried there is James Montgomery Stuart (1816–1889), a Scottish-born journalist and political writer.

In the early 19th century, in a field called Ponte Forcione not far from Solomeo, ancient objects were found, including an inscription that was placed in the lapidary museum in the cloister of San Pietro in Perugia after being donated by the Antinori family.

=== Other sights ===
- Church of Santa Maria di Mandoleto (18th century);
- Medieval town center of Solomeo;
- Castle Montefrondoso (12th century);
- Villa Antinori-Touch (19th century).
- Cucinelli Theatre, opened in September 2008, is a new theater in classical style.
