= Francesco Floriani =

Italian painter

Francesco Floriani (flourished 1568) was an Italian painter, known for his portraits and sacred subjects.

== Biography ==
He was born in Udine, and trained under Pellegrino, and displayed a great talent for portraiture. Many of his paintings were in the possession of the Emperor Maximilian II, by whom he was employed, along with his brother Antonio, also a painter. His Judith has great merit.
