= Girolamo di Bernardino =

Italian painter

Girolamo di Bernardino or Girolamo da Bernardino, also known as Girolamo da Udine, (active around 1506) was an Italian painter of the Renaissance period. A painter of the Venetian school and a pupil of Pellegrino da San Daniele, he is known primarily for a small picture of The Coronation of the Virgin, painted for San Francesco in Udine.

He decorated the churches at Lestizza and Carmona (now in Slovenia) with frescoes in 1511 and 1518.
