= Brunello Cucinelli =

Italian entrepreneur and philanthropist

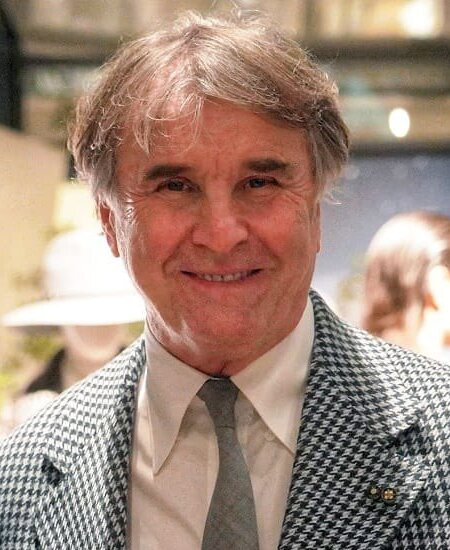
- Cucinelli in 2026
- Born: September 3, 1953 (age 73); Castel Rigone, Umbria, Italy
- Occupations: Fashion entrepreneur, humanist
- Years active: 1978–present
- Known for: Humanistic capitalism, cashmere fashion

Brunello Cucinelli (Italian pronunciation: [bruˈnɛllo kutʃiˈnɛlli]; born 3 September 1953 in Castel Rigone) is an Italian luxury creative director and the executive chairman of his eponymous made in Italy brand, Brunello Cucinelli. He has been described as a "philosopher-designer".

== Early life and education ==
Cucinelli grew up on a farm outside of Perugia. His childhood home had no electricity or running water. Cucinelli dropped out of engineering school at age 24, choosing instead to read philosophical texts on his own.

== Career ==
Cucinelli's first product was cashmere wool sweaters in bright colors. In 1977 he started making dyed cashmere in a small workshop. He founded Brunello Cucinelli SpA in 1978 with the Italian lira equivalent of about $550. To drum up interest and demand for the nascent business, he paid some to pretend to be menswear buyers overwhelming his booth at menswear trade shows with orders for his products, creating an image of an already flourishing business. After the initial public offering of Brunello Cucinelli SpA his personal net worth exceeded $1 billion.

In June 2025, due to the ownership of 50.05% of the shares of his namesake company, Cucinelli had a personal net worth of approximately $4.4 billion.

== Philanthropy ==
In 2018, Cucinelli raised €100 million for charity by selling 6% of his shares. Through his foundation, he has funded the restoration of the village of Solomeo and several monuments across the surrounding valley.

=== Architecture ===
Cucinelli believes that architecture "needs to symbolize higher meanings besides serving a material purpose." He collaborated on the re-design and expansion of Solomeo with Italian architect Massimo de Vico. In 2021, Cucinelli announced that he would again be partnering with de Vico to transform one of Solomeo's 18th-century villas into a "Universal Library" that will carry books on philosophy, architecture, literature, poetry and craftsmanship.

== Awards and honors ==
- Leonardo Prize
- Honorary degree in philosophy and human relationships ethics from University of Perugia
- Cavaliere del lavoro – Italian Order of Merit for Labour in 2010
- Premio Guido Carli, 2011
- Pitti Immagine Uomo prize
- Fashion Group International, Fashion Star Honoree Award, October 2014
- Global Economy Prize for “Honorable Merchant” from the Government of Germany
- America Award of the Italy-USA Foundation in 2019
- International Leonardo The Immortal Light Prize, Philosophy and Beauty section in 2020.

== Personal life ==
Cucinelli is married to his hometown sweetheart Federica, and the couple have two daughters: Camilla and Carolina.
