= San Cristoforo, Montesperello =

Church in Monte Sperello, Italy

San Cristoforo Chiesa di San Cristoforo
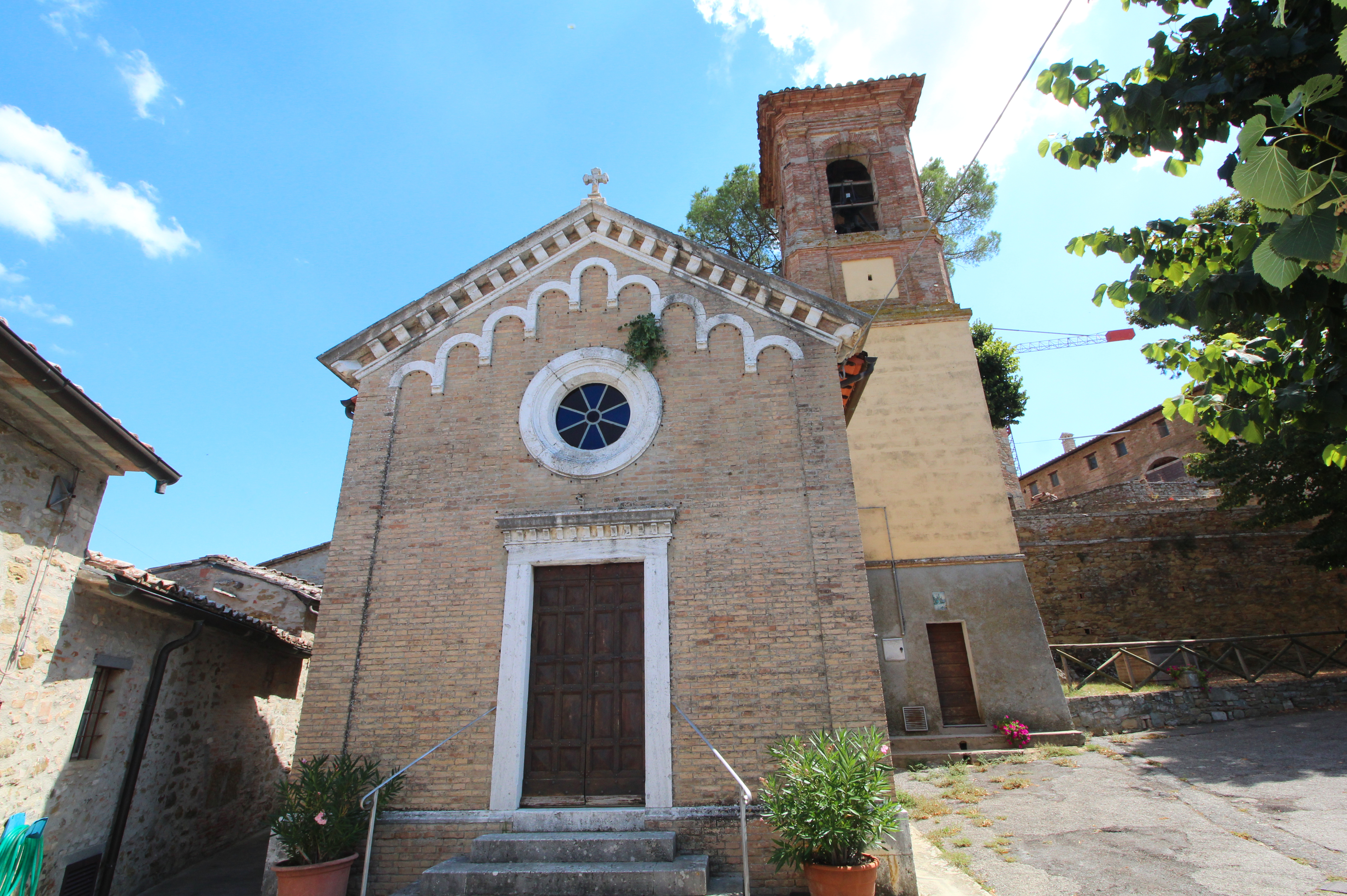

Religion
- Affiliation: Roman Catholic
- Province: province of Perugia

Location
- Location: Montesperello, Magione, Umbria, Italy
- Interactive map of San Cristoforo; Chiesa di San Cristoforo
- Coordinates: 43.125068°N 12.228390°E

San Cristoforo ("St. Christopher", Italian: Chiesa di San Cristoforo), is a Catholic church located in Montesperello, in the municipality of Magione, which is part of the province of Perugia, in Umbria, Italy.

The parish church adjoins Castle of Montesperello, outside the castle walls and having an external bell tower.

== History ==
It was registered in Liber beneficiorum in 1350, rebuilt in 1400 to 1450. The belfry in its present form refers to 1797.

At the beginning of the 1930s, in place of the sacristy a chapel was built, dedicated to St. Francis of Assisi. There are three paintings by artist Tedeschi Tito, which depict St. Francis, and buildings located in Assisi and Montesperello.

July 3, 1949, the painter Gerardo Dottori completed the decoration of the church's apse with 3 frescoes. It is a triptych dedicated to St. Christopher, which includes the conversion of the Saint, the carrying Jesus and the martyrdom of the Saint.
