= Badia di Sant'Arcangelo =

Coordinates: 43.079607°N 12.165074°E

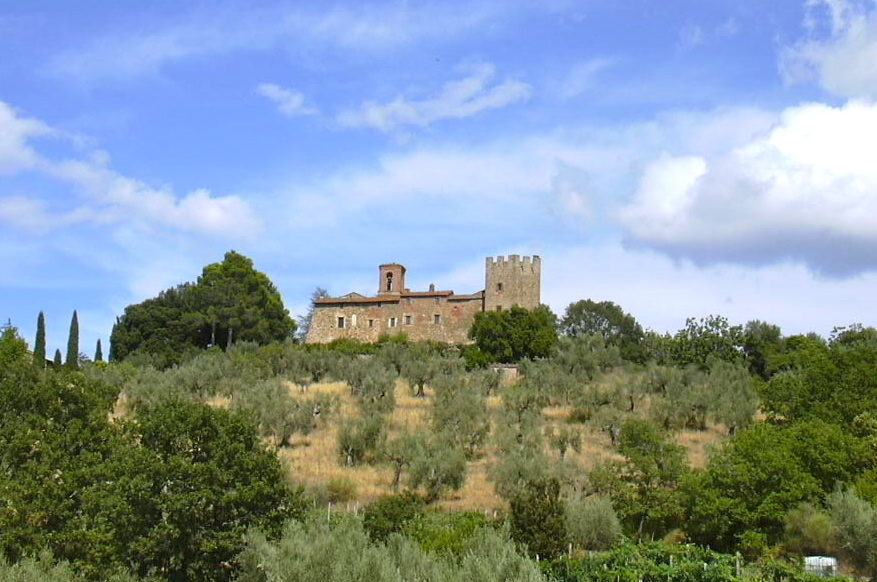
Badia di Sant’Arcangelo

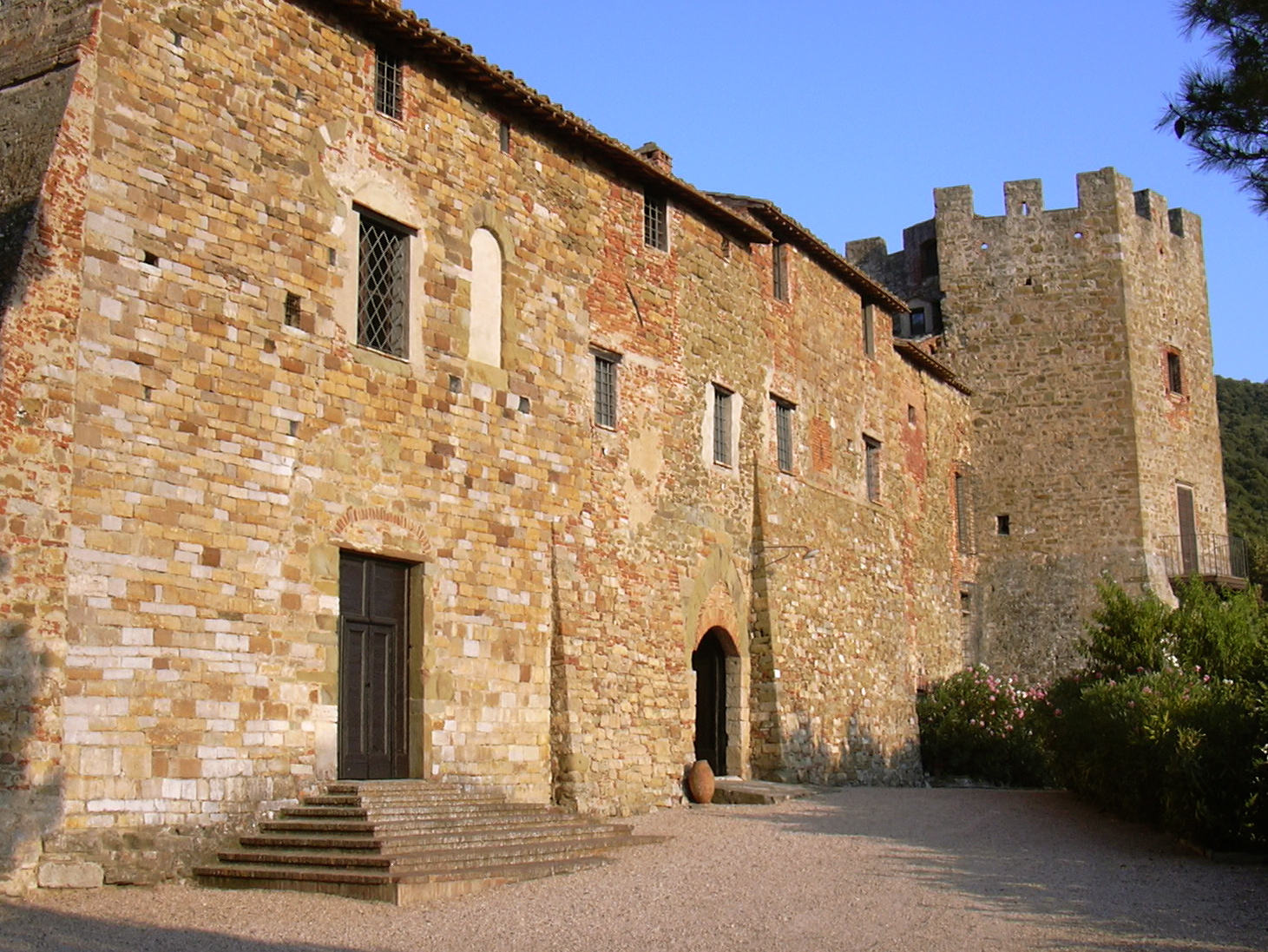
Western front overlooking the lake

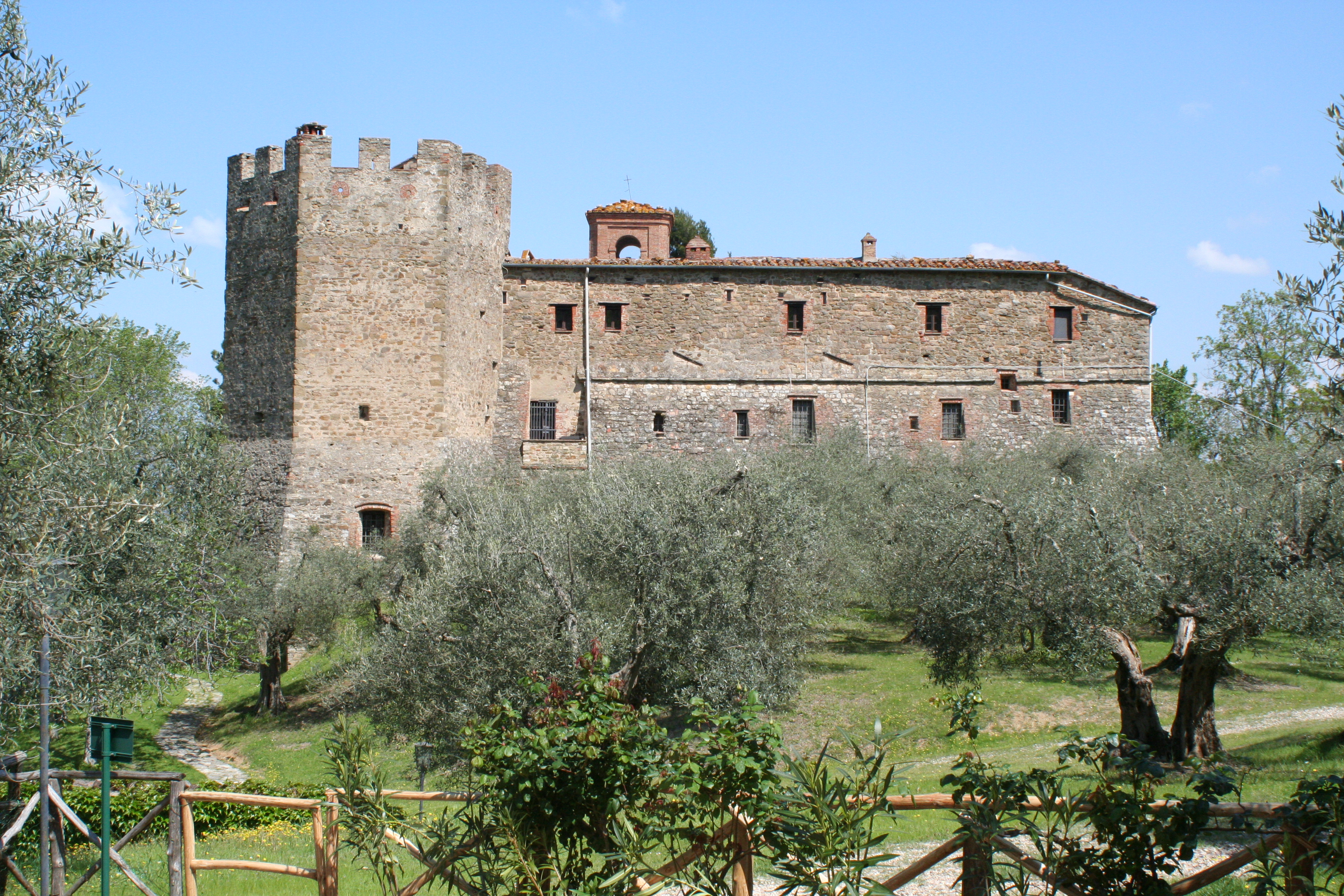
Southern front, from pool area

The Badia of Sant’Arcangelo (the ‘Abbey of Saint Archangel’) is a former Benedictine abbey founded around the year 1000. It is located above the village of Sant’Arcangelo, which is part of the commune of Magione, on the south-eastern shore of lake Trasimeno in the Italian region of Umbria.

== Building ==
The site on a hill on the slope of an oak wood-covered mountain, surrounded by olive groves, offers views over lake Trasimeno. The architecture shows traces of many changes and conversions undertaken by a succession of owners. Its original creation as a religious building remains obvious, in conjunction with elements of a strong fortress.

The façade of the Romanesque church as part of the abbey call attention, as do the massive foundations with narrow slits typical for fortresses. Over time, a tower, battlements and loopholes – still visible at the top of the tower – accentuated the character of the abbey as a stronghold, also recognizable through external walls that are now enclosed, and openings now facing inward.

The plant forms an irregular rectangle around a patio with a deep well. The church with its campanile, consecrated to Saint Michael, forms its north flank and a fortress tower with battlements the south-eastern angle.

== History ==
The monastery-cum-fortress was built as part of a defensive chain of ramparts on the Eastern shore of lake Trasimeno around the year 1000, formed by the fortified settlements of San Feliciano, Monte del Lago, Zocco and San Savino. At that time, the village beneath Sant’Arcangelo was called Aiola, whereas the mountain above was and still is called Marzolano.

In the year 1014 the monastery was one of the many properties the Emperor Henry II granted to the Abbey of Farneta in the Diocese of Arezzo; the crypt of the church dates from that period. A year after, however, in 1115, Pope Pascal II attributed it to the monastery of San Pietro in Perugia. Both attributions were confirmed by succession of Popes, which led to a conflict of interests between the two monasteries of Arezzo and Perugia. In 1206, for instance, Pope Innocent III counts Sant’Arcangelo "with all its properties" among the churches owing allegiance to the bishop of Perugia. In 1238, on the other hand, Pope Gregory IX confirmed the affiliation of the monastery to Santa Maria of Farneta. Every Ascension day, it had to pay a tribute of two measures of oil, ten measures of wheat and 20 measures of wine. This dependency of Farneta ended towards 1420; in 1332 an independent abbot presided over Sant’Arcangelo. Ties to Farneta – and San Pietro - remained close, however, for which frequent commissions by the abbots of these monasteries to the abbot of Sant’Arcangelo testify.

In 1361 the church of Sant’Arcangelo figured in the property register of Perugia with a modest value of two "heavy lira" and ten "pennies". This value rose with time, especially due to the addition of the properties of Santa Maria di Ancaelle, which were wholesale added to Sant’Arcangelo. Later, 1712 "heavy lira" were registered as its highest value.

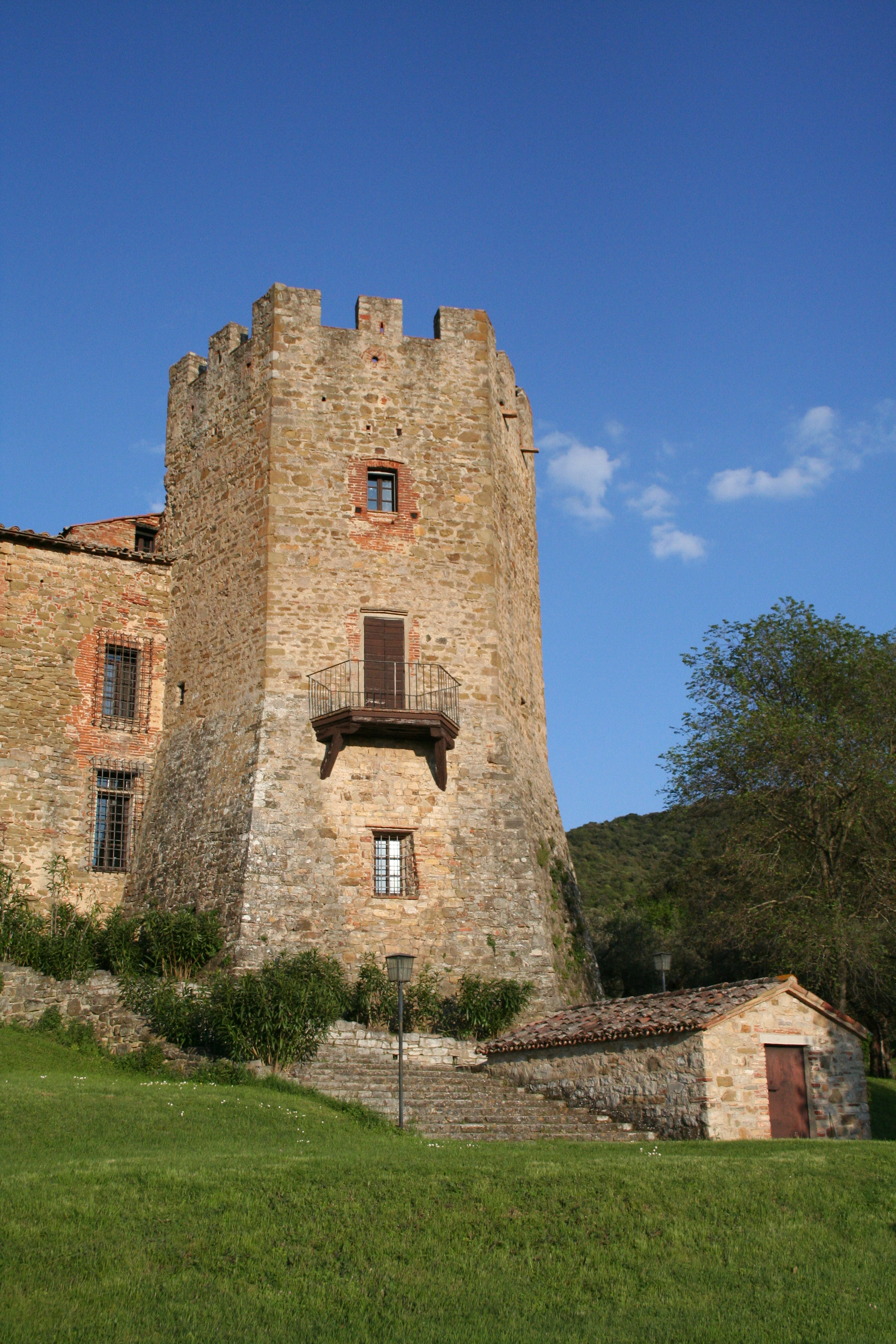
tower

In 1376, Perugia enlarged its chain of ramparts especially on the traditionally vulnerable points on lake Trasimeno and the lake of Chiusi. The abbey of Sant’Arcangelo was strengthened in the manner of a fortress and received a consignment of weapons and ammunition. Towards the end of the 14th century, the monastery was barely inhabited anymore. It is not known whether causes other than the prevalence of malaria – whose vectors, mosquitoes, bred in the swamps – may have contributed to this.

Around 1420 Monsignore Benedetto Guidalotti, bishop of Recenati and founder of the Faculty of New Sciences of Perugia, became interested in the now empty building. On 19 December 1426 he received from Pope Martin V the eternal property rights over the monastery and the surrounding land. A second papal bull of 20 April 1426 specified that the mentioned land were to remain eternally the Faculty’s property – a decision confirmed in 1429 and 1430. These papal decisions were again confirmed in 1488 in the property register of Perugia, which listed the monastery as part of the properties of the Faculty of New Sciences. The property registers of 1605 and 1786 confirm the ownership; the Faculty remained the owner of Sant’Arcangelo well into the 19th century.

No one, however, seemed to be eager to cultivate the land around Sant’Arcangelo, which therefore offered it for "eternal settlement". In the end, a community of settling gypsies reclaimed it through draining the swamps at the bottom of the hill. In 1763 still, bishop Amadei commented after a visit to the church: "it is situated above a slope with an unhealthy climate". Over time, the system of ‘eternal settlement’ led to litigations and drained the finances of the Faculty to the point that it decided to lease the whole property at first for a period of three, then for six and finally nine years.

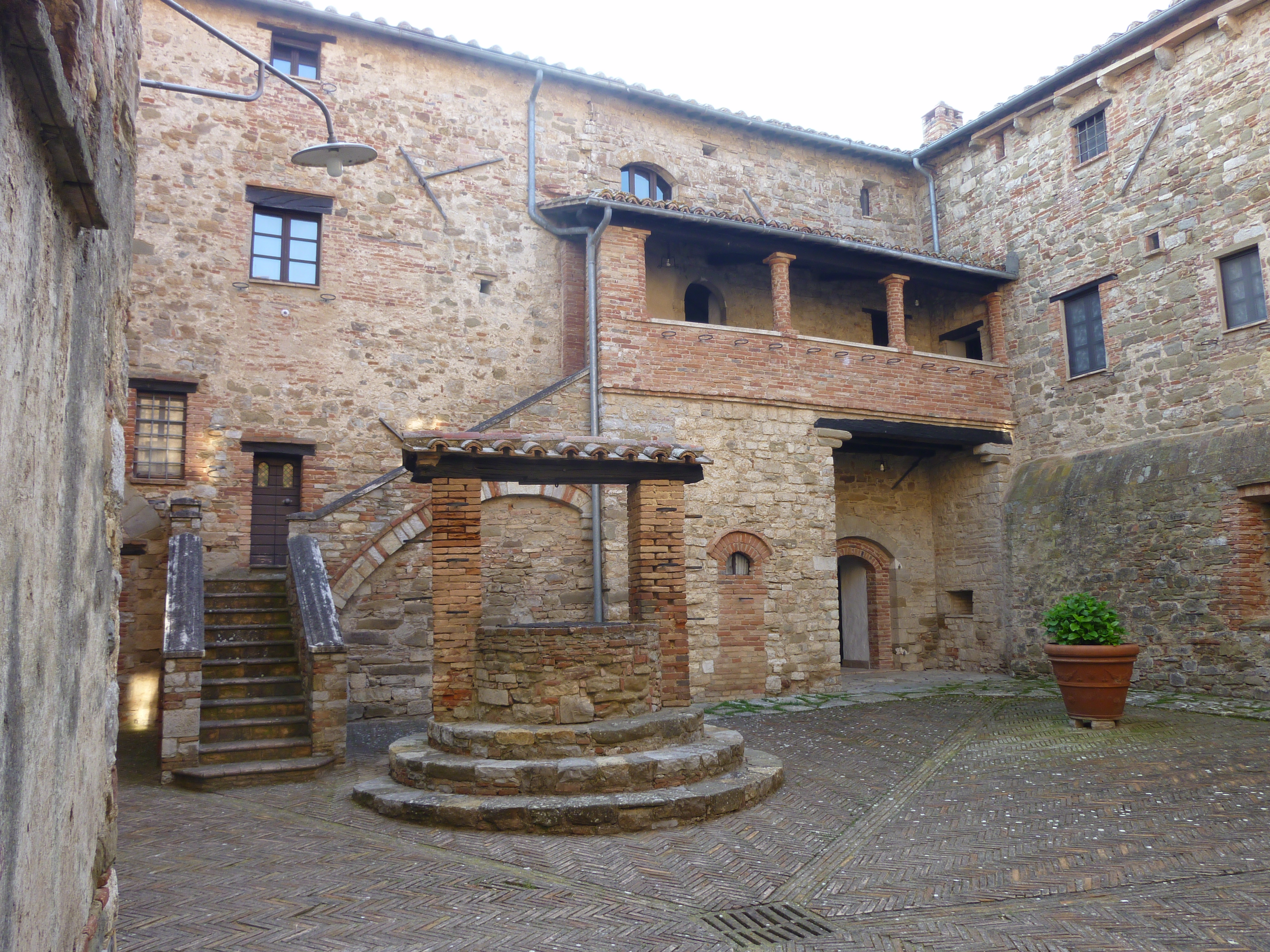
patio

The lease contract of 1779 lists a "cellar, oil mill, wheat and oil deposit, and household utensils for wine and oil in the mansions". The cultivation of mulberry trees in the middle of the 18th century produced significant profit. Throughout the 19th century, the Faculty’s accounts listed expenses for maintenance and repair for the buildings of Sant’Arcangelo. In 1858 it was deemed necessary to "build a kiln in order to produce the tiles necessary for restoration". At that time, the building was used for a diversity of purposes, which entailed a number of structural adaptations. The innermost of the monastery, probably once surrounded by arcades, was transformed into a patio with a deep well, whose inner shape has remained almost unchanged.

== Modern period ==
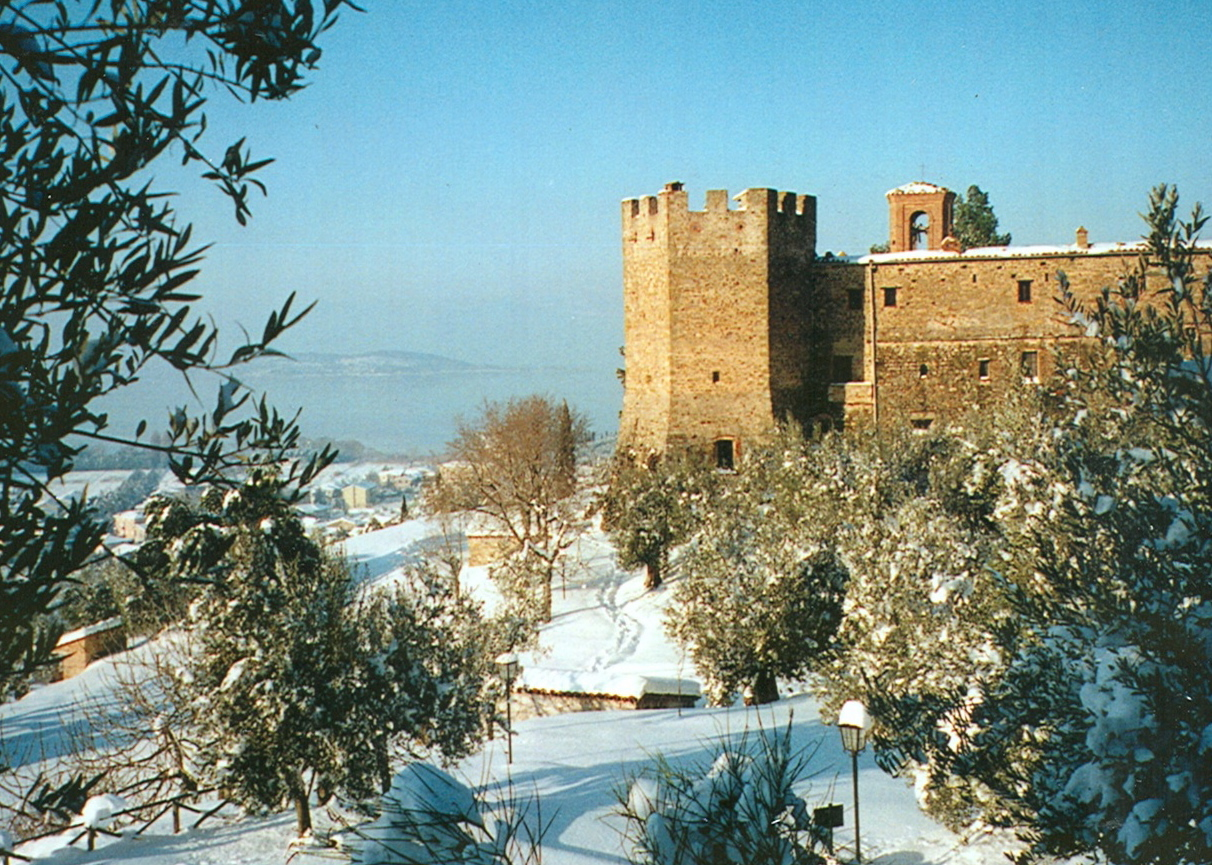
winter 1995

As from 1901 the Faculty of New Sciences abandoned its educational vocation, following years burdened with troubles. Its properties continued to be managed by an administrative council for a number of years, until the nomination of a royal commissioner in 1913. Just before this, the decision was taken to sell the property of Sant’Arcangelo. On 31 March 1913, the notary Gianbattista Brizi authenticated the sale by the Faculty of the abbey and its rural properties to Count Grafen Massimiliano Goutry, with exception of the church, the rectory and a small garden. The receipts tell that the Faculty continued to administrate these remnants. On 16 April 1921 a couple from Rome, Gastone Cerulli Irelli und Elena Vitali acquired the property – authenticated by a notary – and remained its owners until 1935.

On 9 January 1935 the notary Filippo Biarati certified the sale of the property to Carlo Bona und Valeria Delleani from Turin, who were its last private owners. From them it passed on first to the real estate company ‘Sant’Arcangelo’ of Lorenzo Bona, then successively to the companies ‘La Badia’ and ‘Targa Verde’. In the 1970s the architect Nicola De Menna bought the property, renovated it completely dividing it into a good dozen apartments, while respecting the stringent conditions applying to historic monuments. The building is surrounded by an olive grove with centenary-old trees; a swimming pool and a tennis court are part of today’s property.

== Church ==
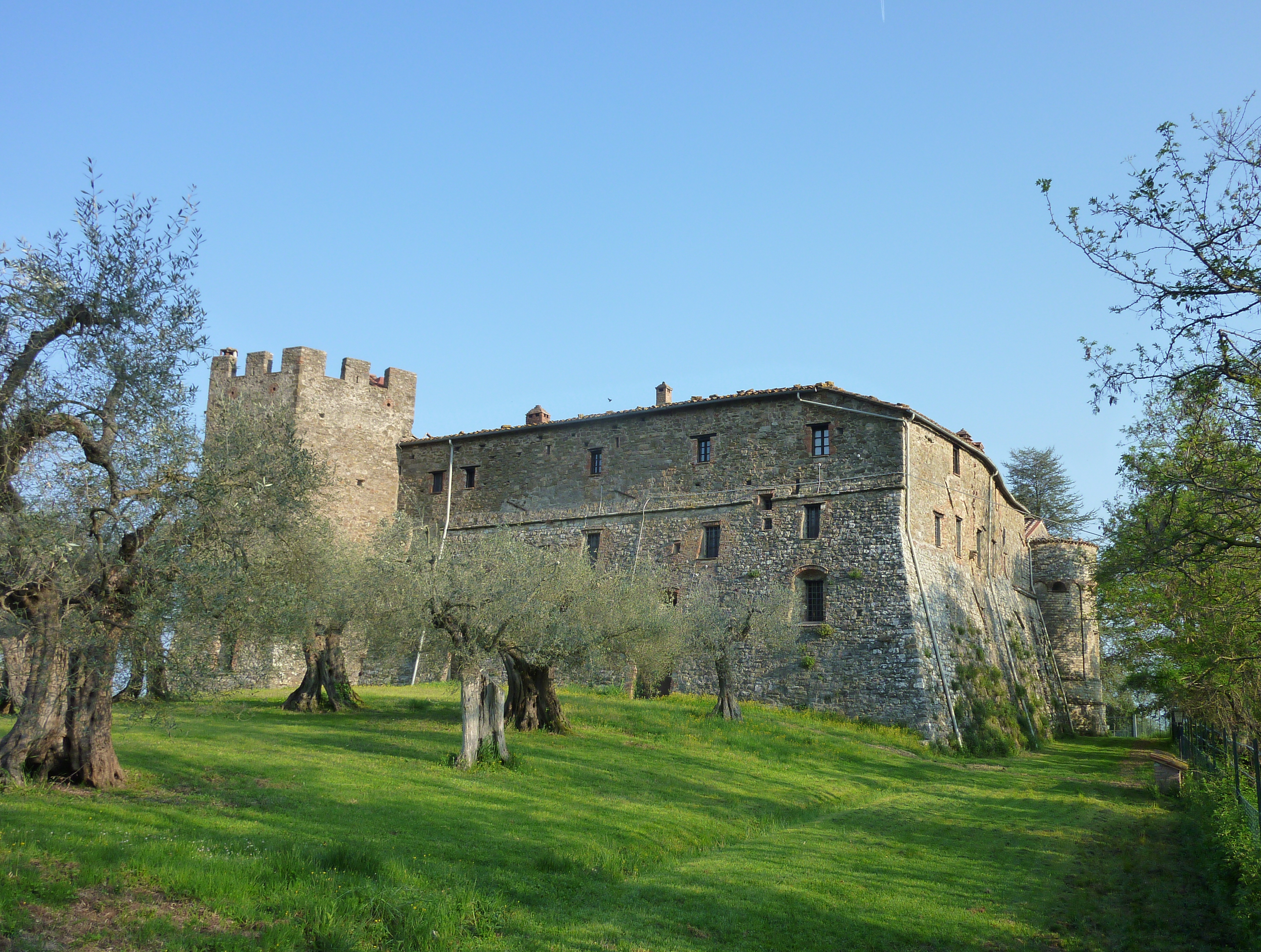
Olive grove, apsis on the right

The date of its construction is unknown; in 1565 it was mentioned that it featured a baptism font and a bell tower. In 1788 the decision was taken to rebuild the old bell tower of the 15th century. The frescoes of the church stem from the same period; a crucifixion with angels and seraphim is still visible today. Earlier, a Saint Girolamo and an Archangel Michael were depicted on the side of the main altar. On another wall of the church, remnants of older frescoes are visible. One of the two side altars – which were initially shaded by canopies – was completely rebuilt in 1817 after lightning damaged it. The apsis was walled in at an unknown date; it shape is recognizable in the outer wall from the outside and from the inside in the apartment above the church.

Nowadays, a wooden life-size statue of Saint Anthony the Great stands on the left wall, and a statue of Saint Rita of Cascia on the right wall. The church is still consecrated and at times used for weddings. Once a year, on St Michael’s day, the priest of Sant’Arcangelo holds mass for the local population.

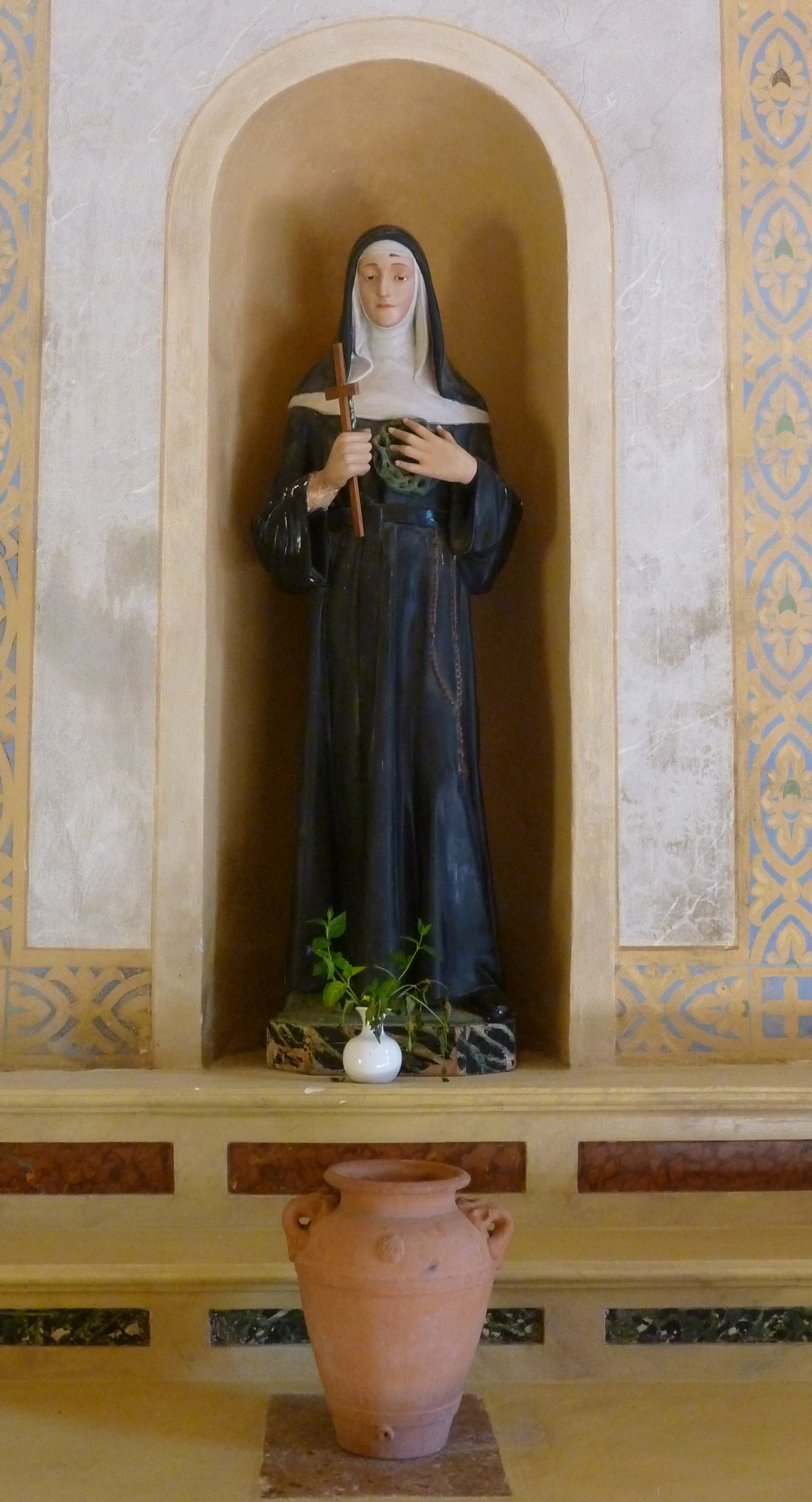
Santa Rita of Cascia

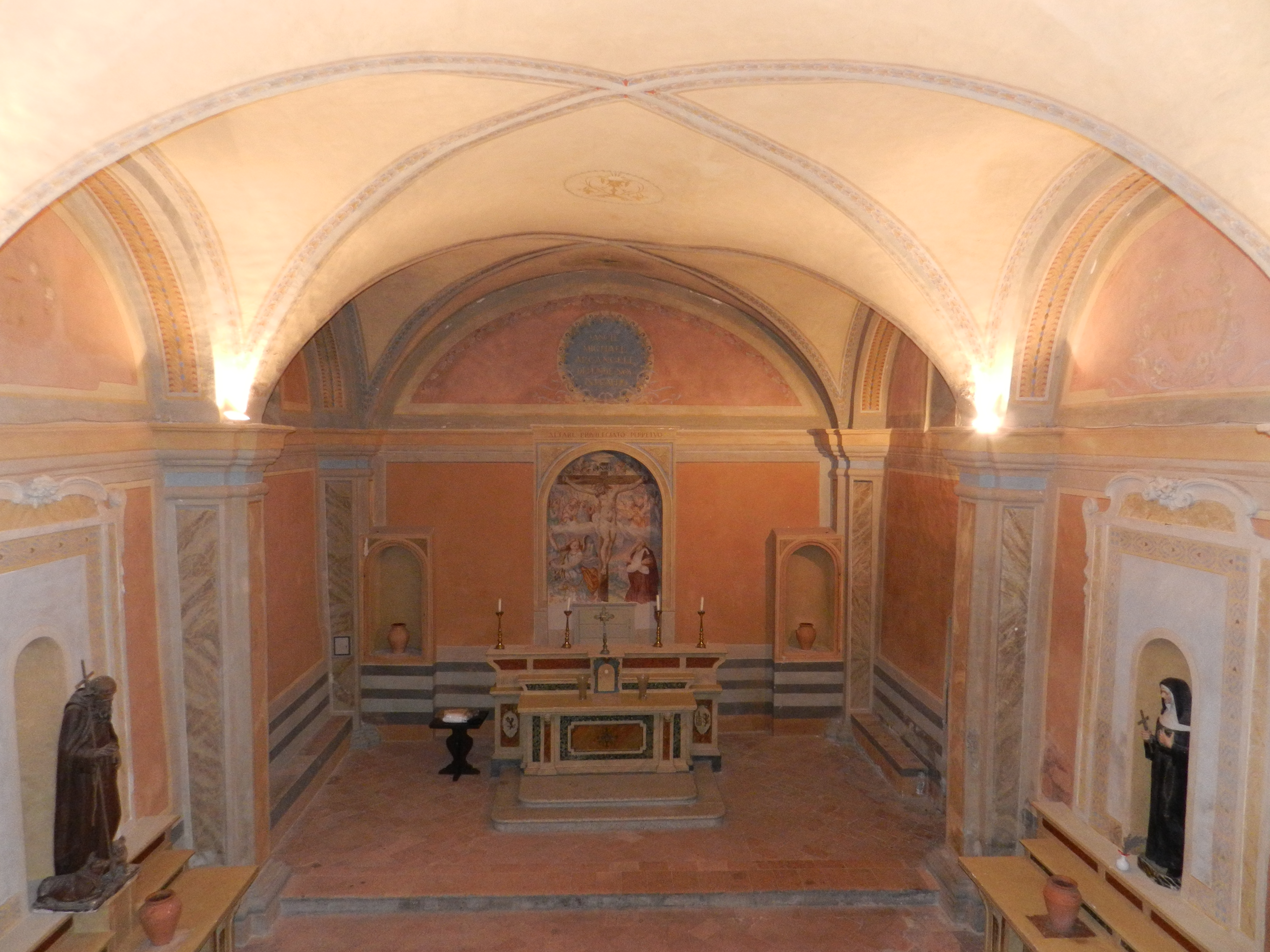
church

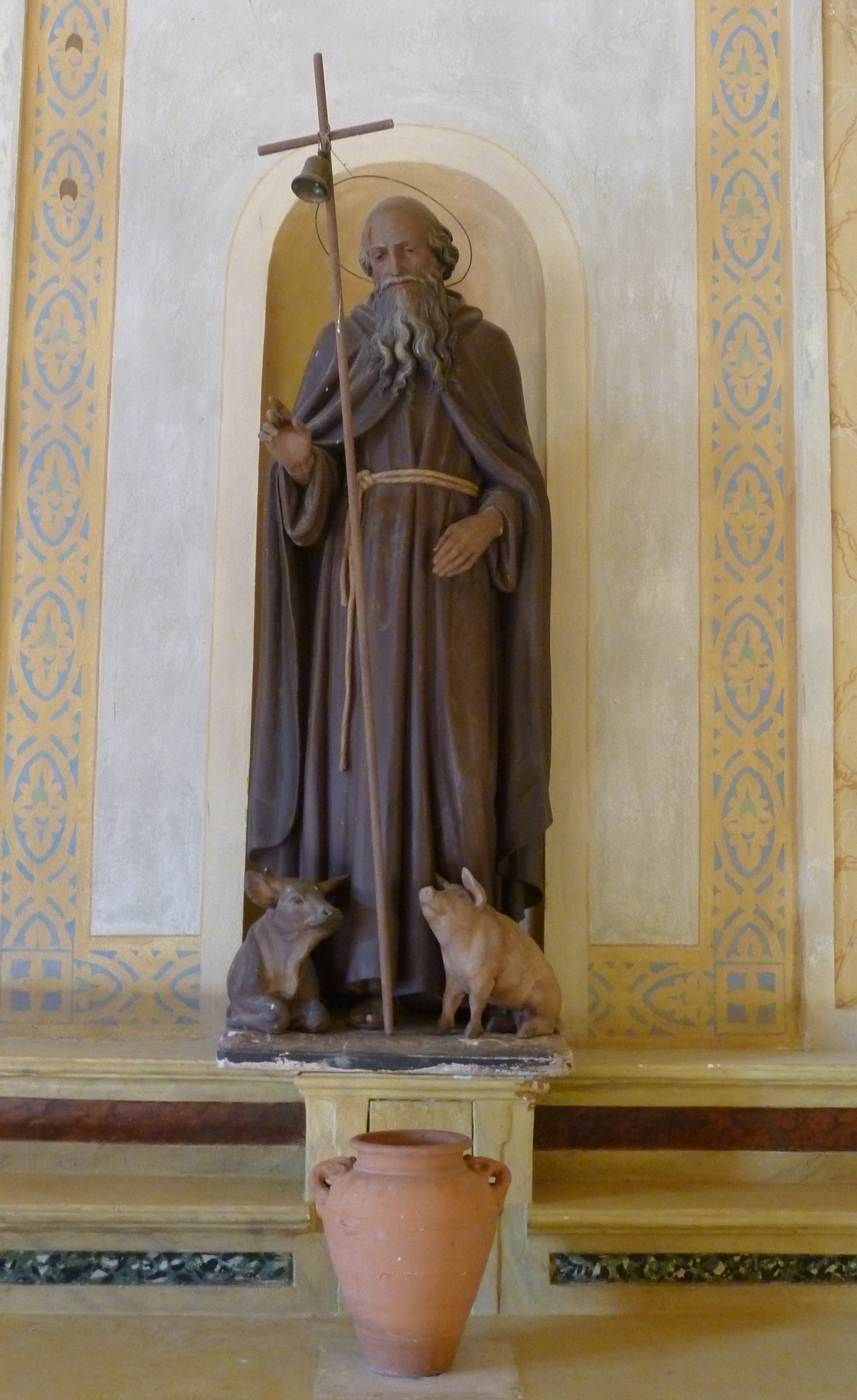
Sant'Antonio Abate

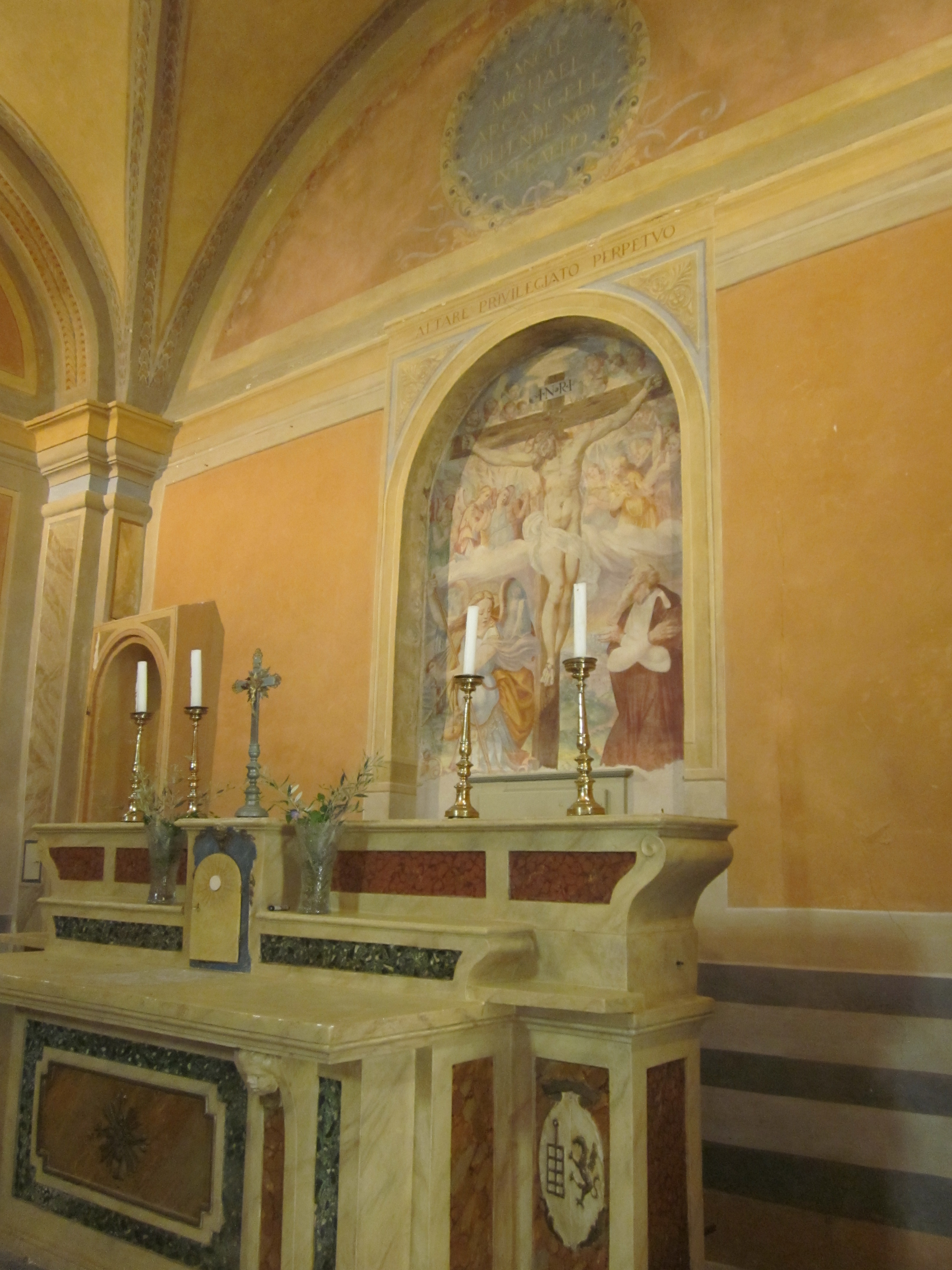
altar
