= Castle of Montesperello =

Coordinates: 43°07′28.8″N 12°13′43.6″E

Castello di Montesperello
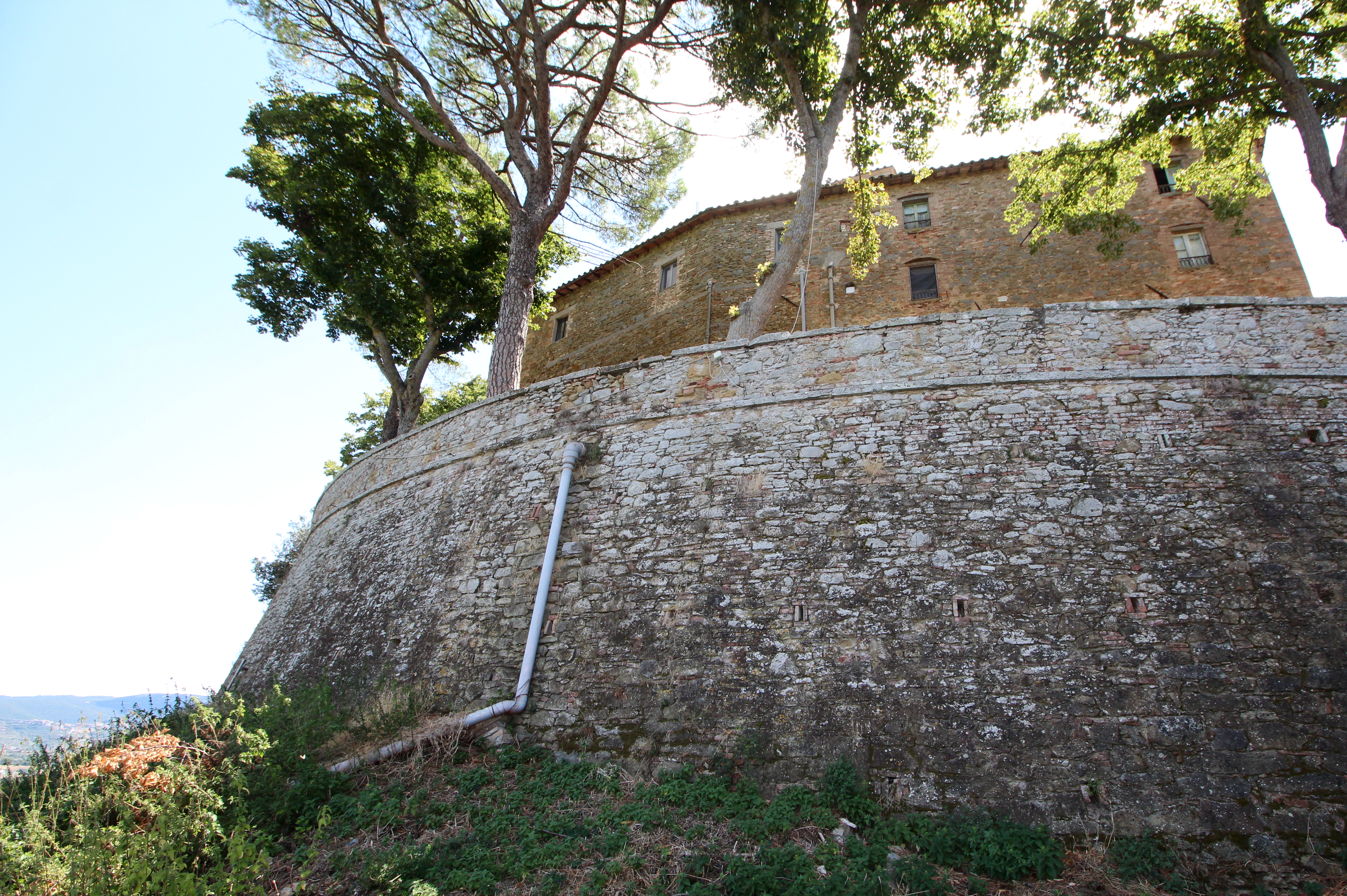

- Location in Perugia, Italy
- Location: Monte Sperello, Magione, Province of Perugia, Italy

History
- Built: 608

Site notes
- Architectural style: Italian
- Owner: EOS S.A.S. family

The Castle of Montesperello (Monte Sperello; Italian: Castello di Montesperello), is a castle located 1 km southeast of the Comune of Magione, which is part of the Province of Perugia, in Umbria, Italy. The Castle has been built during the Carolingian Empire on top of Mountain Penna. In the same area, traces of an Etrurian settlement are to be found.

== History ==
The dominant position of the Castle on top of the Mountain Penna provided good protection in the ancient times. The surrounding valley, with fertile grounds allowed a rich development of agricultural techniques. In more recent times, the Lake Trasimeno nearby, a major touristic site, has long provided attraction to this place. The Montesperello castle has always played a major role with numerous sieges, conquests and battles.

Traces of the Etrurian settlement on the site date back to 210-214 BC. The several Etruscan cinerary urns were found in the walls of two houses located within the area of the Castle and along the hill in the 19th century. Among these there is one of particular interest, with a Medusa head carved.

After the Roman conquest of the entire Italian peninsula, defensive needs declined. There was a rural settlement, with farms scattered near or in the middle of the fields.

After the imperial period, barbarian invasions followed, and, above all, the conquest of Longobard, greatly revived defensive needs. Monte Sperello was part of the Byzantine line of defense against the Longobard attack, developed by the military administration of Perugia.

In 608, Bernardo Montesperli founded here a villa, which at first did not have a boundary wall. It became the core of the castle in the future. The Montesperello family was one of the oldest in the city of Perugia, subjects of the family can be identified by documents of 12th century.

With the creation of the Carolingian Empire, the area Monte Sperello became an imperial property. So in 997 it was donated by emperor Ottone III to the Benedictine monastery of San Gennaro di Campoleone (today the Capolona in the province of Arezzo). He made it by the request of Hugh the Great, abbot and margrave of Tuscany. In the 10th century the creation of the city commune began. The nobility consortium, as a rule, included feudalism, and not from the point of view of a violent but peaceful conquest.

In 1282 the villa Montesperello had 30 inhabitants, and 24 in 1410.

In 1380 the castle was destroyed, returning to the state of a simple villa. In 1439 the castle was rebuilt at the expense of Perugia which considered Montesperello one of its defensive landmarks towards the Trasimeno and the Arezzo area. During this century the St. Christopher's church was built outside the wall.

After the war of 1479 between Florence and the Papal State the castle was almost destroyed.

In 1495, was the last reconstruction according to the appearance of firearms.

In the 19th century Castello di Montesperello was renovated. Now it is a residential villa, which owned by the Pesciarelli family.

== Architecture ==
The building has a hotel occupying 3 buildings, which has 130 rooms, which gives 30-40 apartments.

In the basements of the houses of the castle there is a secret passage that, crossing them, leads to the outside of the walls. This is an escape route in case of siege of the fortress for the owners of these houses. According to what was reported in the 15th century land registers, these were all members of the Montesperelli family.

A few meters north of the church of San Cristoforo, in a building of modern residential buildings, there is an entrance to the cave. Inhabitants jokingly call it "Cave of the Mysteries" (it. Grotta dei Misteri). The cave has a staircase and an area of several meters. In fact, its original function remains obscure. Among the various possible solutions, two are the most likely ones: an Etrurian tomb, a simple cellar, or a tomb later used as a cellar. On the wall there is the inscription engraved indicating the year 1628: this could correspond to the date of discovery of a tomb or to the date of excavation of an underground cellar.

== St. Christopher's Church ==
To the castle adjoins the parish church of St. Christopher of Montesperello (Italian: Chiesa di San Cristoforo), located outside the castle walls and having an external bell tower.

It was registered in Liber beneficiorum in 1350, rebuilt in 1400–1450 years. The belfry in its present form refers to 1797.

At the beginning of the 1930s, in place of the sacristy a chapel was built, dedicated to St. Francis of Assisi. There are three paintings by artist Tedeschi Tito, which depict St. Francis, and buildings located in Assisi and Montesperello.

July 3, 1949, the painter Gerardo Dottori completed the decoration of the church's apse with 3 frescoes. It is a triptych dedicated to St. Christopher, which includes the conversion of the Saint, the carrying Jesus and the martyrdom of the Saint.

== Surrounding neighborhood ==
A few kilometers to the west is the national resort of Lake Trasimeno. At 1 km to the north-east, at the foot of the hill, is the Autodromo dell'Umbria, an operating automobile and motorcycle circuit of the national level. The national airport Montemelino is 3 km to the east. At the bottom of the southern slope is the winery Cantina Berioli, surrounded by vineyards; there are meetings of winemakers in the region and wine-making events are held.
