= Anticurialism =

Anticurialism is a juridical and philosophical line of thought that conglomerates a group of theories and political positions which appeared in Naples after the Council of Trent and which lasted until the modern day and led to the suppression of the feudal, juridical, and fiscal privileges of the clergy.

== See also ==
- Kingdom of Naples
- Monarchism
- Jurisdictionalism
- Jansenism
