= Anti-French uprisings in Italy =

Anti-French uprisings in Italy were popular revolts between 1796 and 1814 against occupying French forces, local Jacobins, pro-French figures, and satellite states set up by France after invading Italy.

The uprisings were spontaneous and isolated from one another, arising in various places, without one single leader to coordinate them or to give them a unified military strategy. They also lacked adequate weapons. The most successful such revolt was by the Army of the Holy Faith in Our Lord Jesus Christ in the Kingdom of Naples, which managed to re-establish the old regime on a more lasting basis.

== Context ==
Italy in 1796.

1796-1799 is known in Italy as the "Jacobin thirty years", as it saw the peninsular invaded by Revolutionary France's Army of Italy under Napoleon Bonaparte. On 10 April 1796 French troops occupied the Duchies of Milan and Mantua, both Austrian territory, then the Duchy of Modena and Reggio and finally the northern parts of the Papal States (the papal legations of Ferrara, Bologna and Romagna). The following year they brought down the republics of Venice (12 May 1797) and Genoa (14 June 1797). They occupied Rome on 10 February 1798, deposing the Pope as temporal ruler and replacing him with the Roman Republic.

This left the Kingdom of Sardinia, the Principality of Benevento and the Kingdom of Sicily as the only formally independent states in the whole of Italy. Napoleon overturned the political structure of the peninsula: the old monarchies were mostly deposed and replaced by the so-called Sister Republics, entities modelled on the institutions of the Revolutionary France; some territories were annexed directly to France.

Since 1789 French propaganda and other factors had led to a pro-Revolutionary party arising in Italy, allowing Jacobinism to find more fertile soil in Italy than in any other area of Europe besides France. Between 1791 and 1793 various pro-Revolutionary revolts and demonstrations occurred, such as that at Dronero in Piedmont, at Orsogna in Abruzzo and at Rionero in Basilicata. The main central bodies organising Italian Jacobinism were the masonic lodges in Naples and Turin, linked to that in Marseille, which formed societies dedicated to subversive activity. Persecuted by the police, many Italian Jacobins moved to France, gathering around Filippo Buonarroti

Even so, French opinion of Italian Jacobinism varied between scepticism and mistrust. In July 1796 Charles-François Delacroix asked diplomats in Italy for their opinion on the matter - consul Pascal-Thomas Fourcade replied "Italians generally belong to the human species only in the form which distinguishes it and the vices which dishonour it". The French Directory also viewed the core of Jacobins linked to François-Noël Babeuf and the neo-Terrorists with suspicion and many like Lazare Carnot believed that a unified Italian republic could be a rival to France. Driven by events and by the enthusiasm sparked by the Army of Italy's arrival, Italian Jacobinism grew significantly and spread throughout the peninsula. Its supporters actively participated in the new republics' political and administrative life, leading them also to be known as "Jacobin Republics".

Following the stabilising policy decided upon on 15 December 1792 by the French Convention, the peoples "liberated" by revolutionary troops had to contribute to funding those troops' upkeep by raising taxes and duties, applying Cato the Censor's ancient Roman principle of bellum seipsum alet ("war feeds itself") from the Second Punic War. This provoked discontent in Italy at paying for the forces occupying them. The new republics also seized the goods of ecclesiastical mortmain and many church properties were converted to state property.

== 1796-1798 ==
=== Lombardy ===
==== 1796 ====
As of 1796 Lombardy proper was part of the Duchy of Milan and did not include the present-day provinces of Bergamo and Brescia and the city of Crema (all then belonging to the Republic of Venice), nor the Valtellina (dominated by the Protestant Swiss canton of Grisons) and the Lomellina and the Oltrepò (both then parts of the Kingdom of Sardinia). Bonaparte entered Milan on 15 May 1796. Once they had taken and garrisoned the Milan stronghold, the French told the city's population what kinds of supplies they needed - they required them to collect 80,000 food rations (though there were 10,000 troops on the ground). They then began to plunder the city's economic and financial resources, demanding a very large war contribution of 25 million Milanese lire (equivalent to six years of the tribute they had paid to Austria).

They also seized the state coffers, funds held by the city council, charities and religious institutions and even the pledges deposited in the Monte di Pietà. This elimination of assets ruined the Monte, which had to stay closed until 1804 They also looted art treasures, compiling a list of works they wanted - from the Pinacoteca Ambrosiana they took the cartoon for the School of Athens by Raphael, one drawing by Leonardo da Vinci, paintings by Bernardino Luini, Rubens, Giorgione and Mattia Preti and very precious manuscripts, whilst from the Santa Maria delle Grazie they seized Titian's The Crowning with Thorns and Gaudenzio Ferrari's Saint Paul.

While in Milan the citizens' anger was soon quelled, rebellion quickly spread to the neighbouring towns and the surrounding countryside - on 23 May revolt broke out in Pavia (the epicentre of rebellion in the region), Como, Varese and neighbouring towns rose up. All the provinces of Lombardy except Cremona rebelled against their French occupiers. On 24-25 May unrest continued in the countryside around Pavia and spread to that around Lodi.

In Binasco the peasants occupied the town and ejected the French garrison. Binasco was also the town most affected by repression. On 24-25 May general Jean Lannes, commander of a mounted dragoon squadron of around 160 men and three companies of grenadiers (totalling around 420 men), attacked and burned rural farms, seized all their animals, livestock and horse and mule fodder, set fire to about a third of the towns, sacked church goods, raped women and murdered around a hundred people, mainly men, who had opposed the French invasion with weapons. Lannes' only casualty was one of his dragoons killed. After the fall of the main rebel stronghold, the French demolished the walls of Pavia and on 25-26 May sacked and occupied the town.

In the late 18th century the Valtellina was ruled by Protestant Grisons, under which the Salis family rose to power Since 1794 protest movements had been raising community grievances against patrician families had been spreading, with cries of "Long live liberty and long live the French". Bonaparte's arrival in Italy led a Jacobin and Republican circle to form in Sondrio, with links with the one in Brescia. It spread to the point that Grisons sent 9,000 armed men into the valley, but the valley's inhabitants gave an unarmed response. The Council of the Valley decided to ask Bonaparte for protection and to arbitrate the dispute with Grisons. Bonaparte's first suggestion was that the Grisons gave the valley a grant with which it could redeem itself and become a full member as a "fourth league" added to the Three Leagues, but disagreements from some in Grisons scuppered this plan.

==== 1797 ====
In March that year the Republics of Bergamo and Brescia were set up. After pulling down the symbols of Venetian rule (which had lasted in Bergamo since 1428), the revolutionaries began a 'war' against any remains of that past, destroying symbols, columns and statues. Several villages openly rebelled, as did the towns of Lonato and Castenedolo to the south of Brescia, the whole Val Trompia to its north, and the 34 towns of the Riviera di Salò. Troops raised from among native Jacobins in Brescia and Bergamo attacked the Golfo but were repelled and captured, neccesitating French intervention. On 20 May Salò was forced to surrender and the French soon declared that the Riviera was dissolved.

In June revolts occurred in Brianza (Seregno, Busto Arsizio).

On 4 July 1797 local Jacobins attempted a coup by raising a tree of liberty in Chiavenna and organising a provisional government. The local inhabitants immediately rioted, dismissed the authorities imposed by Grisons, supported the local representatives (as did the local clergy), tore down the statue of the governor Pietro Salis, and chiselled off the coats of arms of patrician families' coats of arms and their Grisons rulers. Finally, on 10 October 1797, the Valtellina was removed from Grisons and added to the Cisalpine Republic by a decree from Bonaparte. There was opposition to that annexation in the val San Giacomo and Villa di Chiavenna, both located on the border with Grisons and with strong commercial ties to that region.

==== 1798 ====
In 1798 widespread anti-French revolt again swept the Valtellina. Riots and disorder broke out in Teglio and Grosio, whilst in Cepina rebels arrested and shot the Brescian nobleman and Jacobin Galeano Lechi. The following year the lower Valle rebelled, as did Teglio again. At Delebio the pro-Jacobin priest don Andrea Parravicini was shot by the rebels.

Between 1797 and 1798 revolts also broke out in the area around Mantua, along with a widespread one in the Ticino Canton, part of the Helvetic Republic, which had replaced the Swiss Confederation.

=== Veneto ===
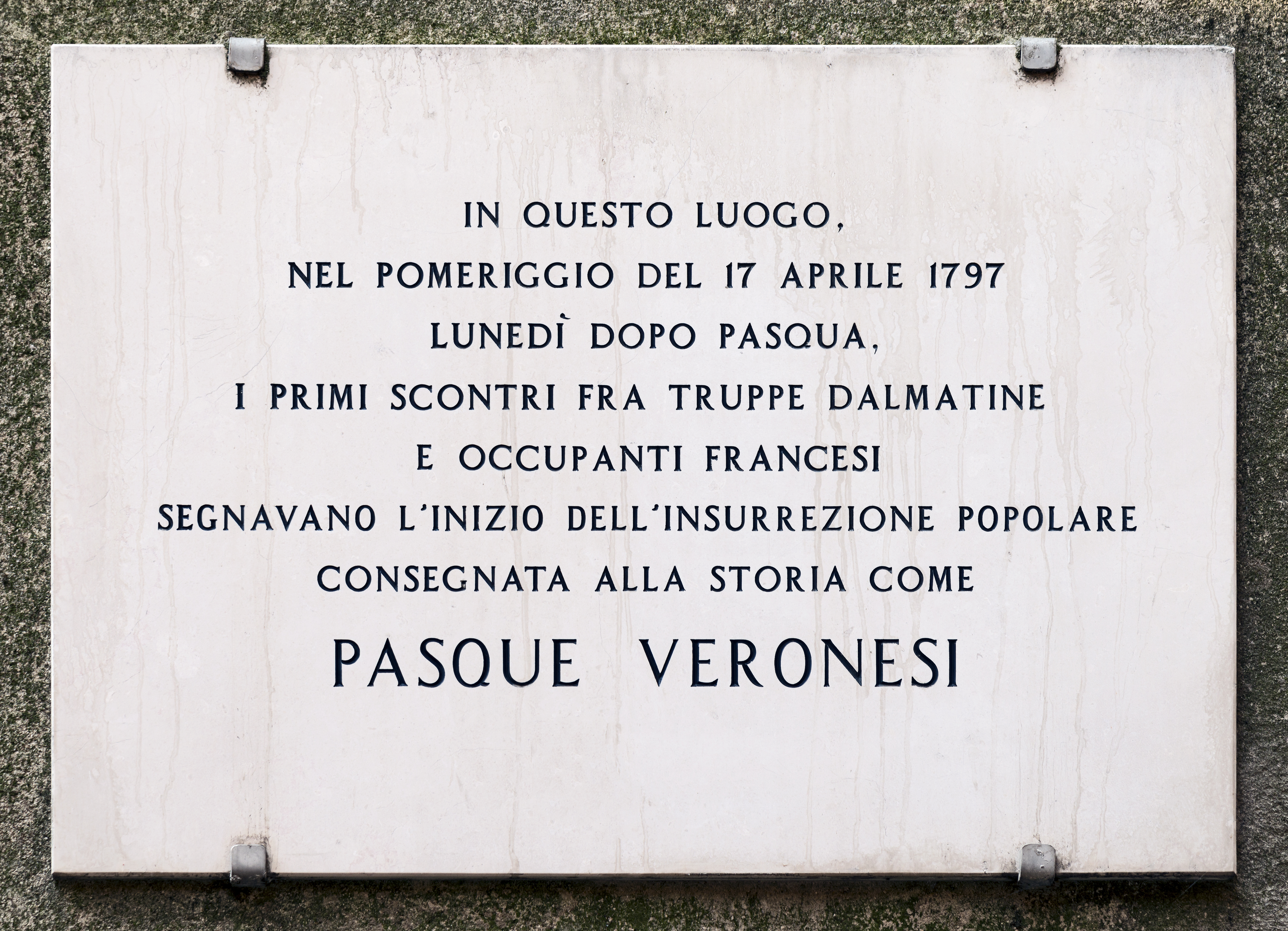
Site of the outbreak of Veronese Easter.

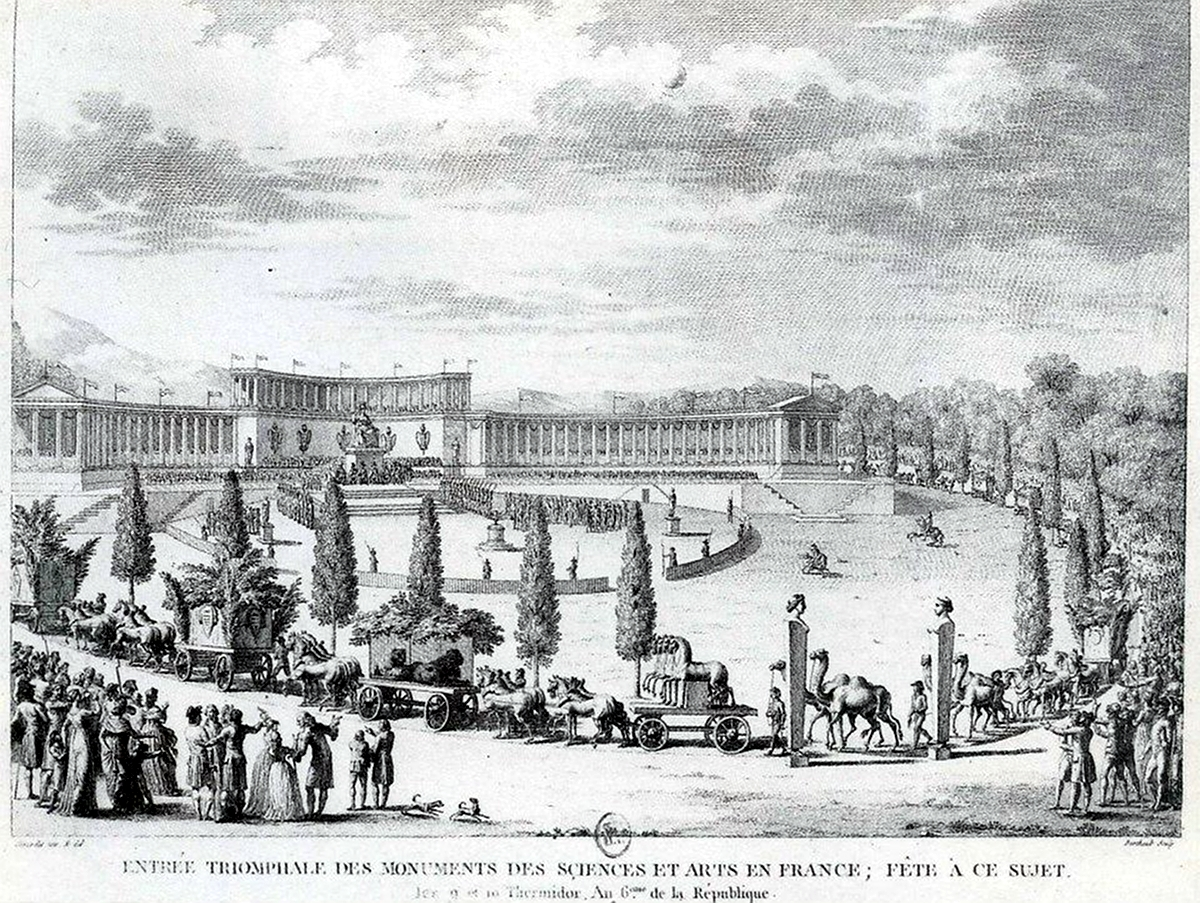
Caravan of looted artworks enters Paris, including the Horses of Saint Mark's.

After Lombardy had been conquered in spring 1796 the Republic of Venice was Bonaparte's next aim on his advance into Austria. The events took place between 1796 and 1797, culminating in the week of 17-25 April 1797. On 30 May 1796 the French defeated the Austrians at Borghetto and crossed the Mincio, entered Veronese territory. When they reached Verona the aggressors hunted down Venetian troops out of the forts before the city and laid siege to it (1 June). The Republic declared neutrality but this was ignored. Relations between the Veronese population and the French troops were difficult from the beginning, due to the French troops' behaviour, which was more like occupiers than guests.

The advance continued during July and August. On 8 September Bonaparte won the Battle of Bassano. By the end of 1796, the French occupied the whole western part of the Veneto. The Austrian defensive line began north of Vicenza and extended as far as Cadore and Friuli. Although the French Directory had declared itself in favour of formally respecting Venice's neutrality, Bonaparte had already decided to end it.

There were encounters between the French and Austrians in the early months of 1797. Alarmed by the Republic's submissive behaviour (it had allowed French forces to march across its lands), the local inhabitants armed themselves and organised a people's army. Of all the revolts in Italy, the one in Verona passed down into history for its size and its ill consequences for the Republic.

The revolt broke out in Verona on 17 April 1797. the second day of Easter, the same day as had been scheduled for the signing of the Peace of Leoben, in which Austria ceded Lombardy to the French in exchange for the territories of the neutral Republic of Venice. The insurgents took control of the city, with the city's population being the main character in the revolt - they launched attacks on their own initiative, both with and without regular Venetian troops in support. Prison doors were opened and Austrian soldiers held by the French freed - these soldiers also played a part in the revolt.

The French responded by training cannon directly on the city from high ground around it. On 19 April the people prepared to defend the city to the bitter end. The French had also barricaded themselves into Castel Vecchio, which the insurgents began besieging on 20 April. The bell in the torre dei Lamberti, located in the most intense area of the revolt, was hit by cannon balls several times.

The French summoned reinforcements - on 21 April Verona was surrounded by 15,000 soldiers. and the following day its ammunition and food began to run low. The city council met on 23 April and the following day the Veronese decided to start negotiating their surrender. The three fortresses overlooking Verona had bombarded the city for eight consecutive days, causing a high number of casualties - at least 2,056 deaths were recorded.

On the morning of 25 April (Saint Mark's feast day) the city surrendered and was given a government on the French Republican Revolutionary model, with regulatory codes, territorial organisation led by prefects, establishing a secular public power distinct from that of the church, and forcing the city council to take over healthcare from the church. The Venetian garrison inside the city was deported to prisoner of war camps in France - only a third of its soldiers returned to Italy alive.

The city was also forced to pay a war contribution of 1,800,000 tournai lire, to hand in silver from churches and other places of worship, to ban religious processions and funerals and to demolish. Many artworks were looted, such as paintings by Titian and Paolo Veronese, and taken to the Louvre. All the loot was brought into Paris in procession on 27-28 July 1798. All lions of St Mark were demolished, as was the monument to the Venetian Republic in piazza Bra, Verona's largest square.

=== Duchy of Modena ===
Between late 1796 and early 1797 several revolts broke out within the duchy of Modena, which had been converted to a republic in October 1796 by Bonaparte's proclamation deposing the fugitive duke Ercole III d'Este, then later the same month merged into the Cispadane Republic. Bonaparte sent an expedition under Jean Baptiste Rusca to put down the first revolts in Concordia and Carrara, but the longer and more serious revolt was that in the Garfagnana between late November 1796 and early January 1797, an area historically linked to the d'Este dynasty. That too was put down harshly with intervention from French troops, who were joined by Italian contingents such as the Cispadane Legion, with death sentences, firing squads, deported hostages and homes destroyed.

=== Papal States ===
==== Legations of Ferrara and Ravenna ====
On 23 June 1796 the French entered Ferrara, then ruled by a papal legate. Despite promising in their proclamation that they would respect religion - soon started to loot church treasuries, even pulling down the bust of Lugo's patron saint Hilary of Galeata, which sparked a popular uprising. Armed only with muskets, they drove the French out of the town and resisted the transalpine army for five days. At Ravenna, on 12 July 1796, the crowd triumphally welcomed papal legate Antonio Dugnani.

==== Legation of Bologna ====
Protests against the unprecedented ban on popular religious traditions also erupted in Bologna and the surrounding countryside, also ruled by a papal legate. In both 1797 and 1798, at in places such as Minerbio and Porretta the population defied the ban by marching through the streets on Corpus Christi. Some Jacobins took advantage of the new political climate to pull down and take away religious symbols - they were imprisoned but later freed. Reactions to trees of liberty were more varied - on 28 July 1798 don Pietro Maria Zanarini cut down two of them planted in the sacristy of his church and was punished by execution.

==== Rome and Lazio ====
The French army took Rome on 10 February 1798, using the murder of general Mathurin-Léonard Duphot in the city as a pretext. On 15 February it declared that pope Pius VI's temporal power was at an end and proclaimed the Roman Republic, modelled on the French one.

Revolts broke out in the areas of the city with the densest population, namely Trastevere and Monte Sacro. The revolt in Trastevere was as brief as it was bloody - it broke out on the evening of Sunday 25 February and ended on 1 March, with the captured insurgents shot in piazza del Popolo. During the same days there was also a revolt in the Castelli Romani (Albano Laziale, Castel Gandolfo and Velletri). In July Veroli and Alatri rose up. The whole of Lower Lazio also rose up against the occupiers.

On 20 March 1798 the constitution of the new Roman Republic was proclaimed, but received a poor reception from the city's population. After the French looting of the city they also had to pay heavy war contributions to the occupiers. The revolt in Lower Lazio also continued, so much so that on 31 July the French commander was forced to pronounce the whole area to be under siege. It also continued to spread, with Giuseppe Maria Tommetta leading a revolt in Terracina in August. On 9 August, after a fierce battle, the French took and sacked the city. After Ferentino was taken general Antoine Girardon sent a letter to the military commander asking urgently for reinforcements, concluding with a phrase that became famous, "C'est absolumment la Vandée!", comparing it to the Royalist revolt in France of that name. A gang led by Michele Arcangelo Pezza, better known as Fra Diavolo, continued to operate in the area against the French.

== General rising of 1799 ==
Austria and Russia formed the Second Coalition against France over the course of 1798. Alarmed, Paris recalled all troops stationed in Italy and the papal legations. As soon as the military presence eased, efforts to re-establish the old government intensified. The working classes continued to play a key part in the revolts.

=== Piedmont ===
On 9 December Charles Emmanuel IV of Savoy, under French pressure, renounced his sovereignty over the Piedmont. and the area was converted into the Subalpine Republic. Popular discontent broke out suddenly soon afterwards and around Christmas the countryside around Alessandria, Asti and Acqui had already revolted and this only spread. By the end of February the village of Strevi revolted - the French assaulted and burned it in response. At Asti (which the French recaptured on 9 May) general Falvigny rounded up 95 people chosen at random from among the population, condemned 86 inhabitants to death and brought them to the parade ground to give a clear message, shooting them and then having his cavalry finish them off with sabres and by trampling them with their horses. The troops set Borgo Salsasio in Carmagnola on fire after a fierce battle with the peasants - about one hundred were killed. The French soldiers also burned the borgo of Piscina. The inhabitants of Mondovì rose up, shouting "Let's send them back as naked as when they came to Italy", but the French assaulted the city and massacred the inhabitants.

While civil war raged in Piedmont, Austro-Russian troops and the 'massa cristiana' militia arrived from Lombardy, led by Branda de Lucioni (popularly known as "Brandaluccione"). Leaving Lombardia, Lucioni entered Piedmont early in May 1799 and then took Vercelli and Santhià. On 13 May he laid siege to Turin, enabling the Austro-Russian advance led by general Alexander Suvorov.

The violent French response threw fuel on the fire of the revolts rather than ending them, with western Piedmont also rising up. On 17 Lucioni's 'massa', which was still holding Turin, blocked an attempted French encirclement and defeated three columns. When Suvorov arrived on 25 May Lucioni had around 6,000 men and the following day Suvorov entered Turin, welcomed enthusiastically by the population, and dismissed the 'massa', declaring its mission accomplished.

=== Lucca ===
The Republic of Lucca's neutrality did not prevent it being invaded by French troops under general Jean Mathieu Philibert Sérurier in February 1799, who formed another Jacobin republic on the French model. The only revolts against it were the next spring in the countryside - peasants attacked French troops near Vinchiana (San Lorenzo di Brancoli) in val di Serchio, whilst at Viareggio and in the neighbouring towns there was an anti-French revolt.

=== Tuscany ===
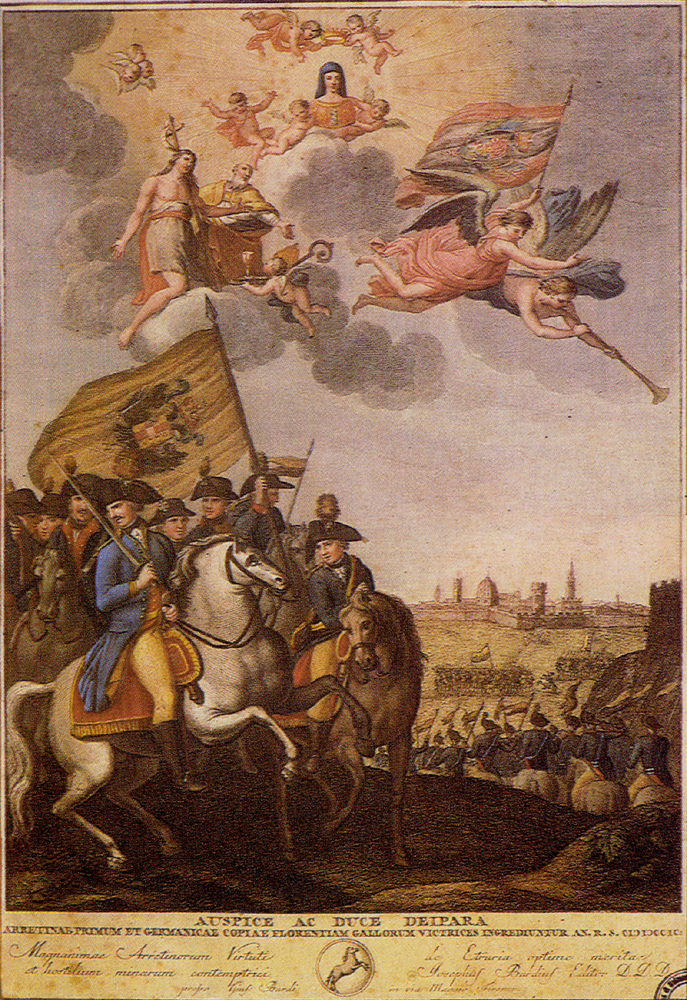
Sanfedista print showing 'Viva Maria' troops entering Florence in July 1799.

During the 1796-97 Italian campaign the Grand Duchy of Tuscany had declared itself neutral. On 24 March 1799 the French broke a treaty with the Grand Duchy and invaded Tuscany. The first anti-French uprisings were on 12 and 13 April in Florence and Pistoia, spreading across the whole Grand Duchy during the days following Suvorov's defeat of the French and the fall of the Cisalpine Republic (27 April 1799). General revolt spread from Valdarno to Casentino and Mugello.

In the following days the town of Arezzo became the centre of the revolt - its inhabitants rose up to the cry of "Viva Maria", reprising the battle cry used in 1798 in Trastevere in Rome. After forcing the French garrison to flee, the city efficiently organised itself, setting up self-government as a "Suprema deputazione" and a military command uniformed in the colours of Tuscany and marching behind the image of the Madonna of Comfort who, following a deep-rooted Catholic tradition, was made "generalissima" of the army. It reached 50,000 men and managed to push back the French at the Battle of Rigutino and free all the neighbouring towns and cities, though they also massacred thirteen Jewish people in the Siena ghetto. It then pushed towards the Marche, Umbria and Lazio, where it achieved numerous successes - on 13 July it took the Forte di San Leo and on 3 August the capital Perugia.

=== Cisalpine Republic ===
==== Bologna ====
Thousands of armed peasants joined the Austrian forces fighting the French. The French had captured Bologna on 18 June 1796 and set up a regime terrorising the population - Napoleon demanded a war contribution of 4,000,000 tournai lire, artworks were looted and peasants were forced to hand over livestock and grain to the French. This came to a head on 31 January 1798, when the Jacobin government imposed a new tax on all citizens over the age of sixteen and a revolt broke out.

Gangs of peasants, priests and former soldiers in the papal armies began roaming the territory and the nickname "insurżent" arose for such popular brigands. They freed Cento and San Giovanni in Persiceto from the Jacobin government and the revolt spread to the Reno valley (Pianoro, Loiano, Monghidoro, Castel d'Aiano, Porretta, Lizzano). In March rumours of the Austrians' arrival became stronger and in May the rebels (in effect a vanguard of the Austro-Russian army) attempted their first attack on Bologna, which fell at the end of June.

==== Romagna ====
1799 was the year of the "Grande Insorgenza" which ejected French troops from Romagna, with crucial help from Austria and Russia. On 7 April that year the first revolts broke out in Rimini, the day of the Madonna dell'Acqua procession to intercede for the rains to cease, as they were badly damaging the crops. The population defied the ban on leaving churchyards, shouting "The procession shall go out! Viva Maria!".

On 17 May count Matteo Manzoni, supreme commander of the anti-French forces in Lugo, encouraged by the Austro-Russian advance under Suvorov, pulled down the republican symbols with the cry of "Long live Francis II! Long live Pius VI!" and put the images of the Virgin Mary and papal authority back in place. On 27 May all the valley towns between Cesena and the Montefeltro revolted. Insurgents from Forlì, Lugo and Ravenna joined forces and on 30 May ejected the Jacobin regime from Faenza, forcing general Pierre-Augustin Hulin's troops to flee.

On the same day the "Grande Insorgenza" broke out in Rimini, where general Fabert's troops were on the alert for an Austrian landing. The revolt there was led by a fisherman, Giuseppe Federici - a plaque to him was put up in 1999 on the wall of the Borgo San Giuliano, the area where most of the city's fishermen lived. Sailors and fishermen forced the French troops to barricade themselves inside the city, the Austrians landed unopposed and joined the locals in marching on the city, and the French abandoned it. A large festival was held the following day, with sailors, fishermen and peasants retaking the city. Fabert tried to attack but was repelled and forced to flee into the Apennines, where he was captured by the insurgents at San Leo.

=== Roman Republic ===
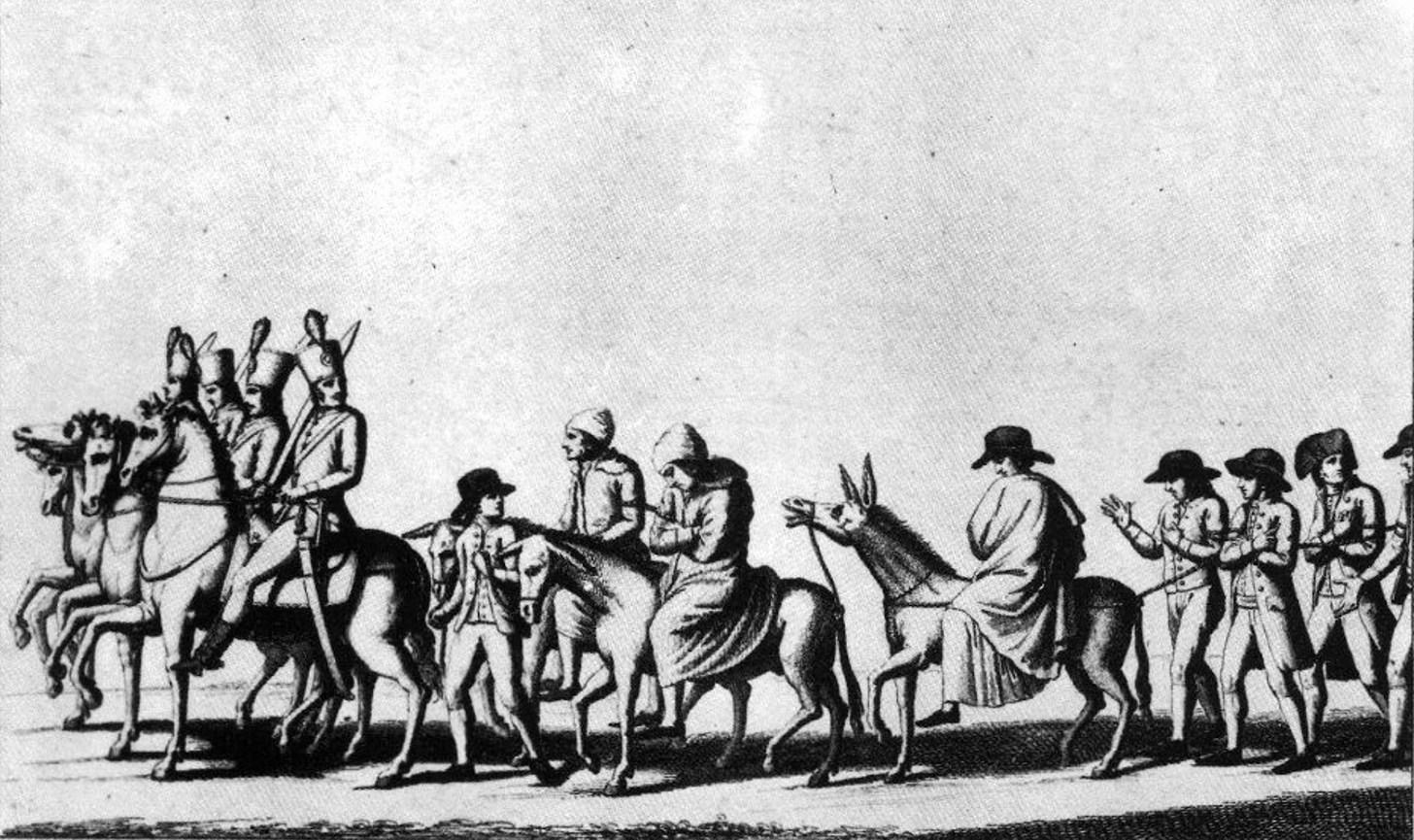
After the Neapolitan conquest the last two consuls of the Roman Republic were led through the city in procession as criminals.

The uprisings in Rome resumed after the Austro-Russian successes. On 15 June 1799 Viterbo ejected its Jacobins, who retreated to Rome. The insurgents assembled in the area around Orvieto and defeated the French at Bassano Romano. The revolt spread into the whole of Upper Lazio and also merged with that of the inhabitants of Arezzo. On 4 August the rebels prepared to attack Rome and negotiations began. On 19 September the French abandoned the city and at the end of that month the army of the Kingdom of Naples occupied the city and restored it to the pope.

=== Neapolitan Republic ===
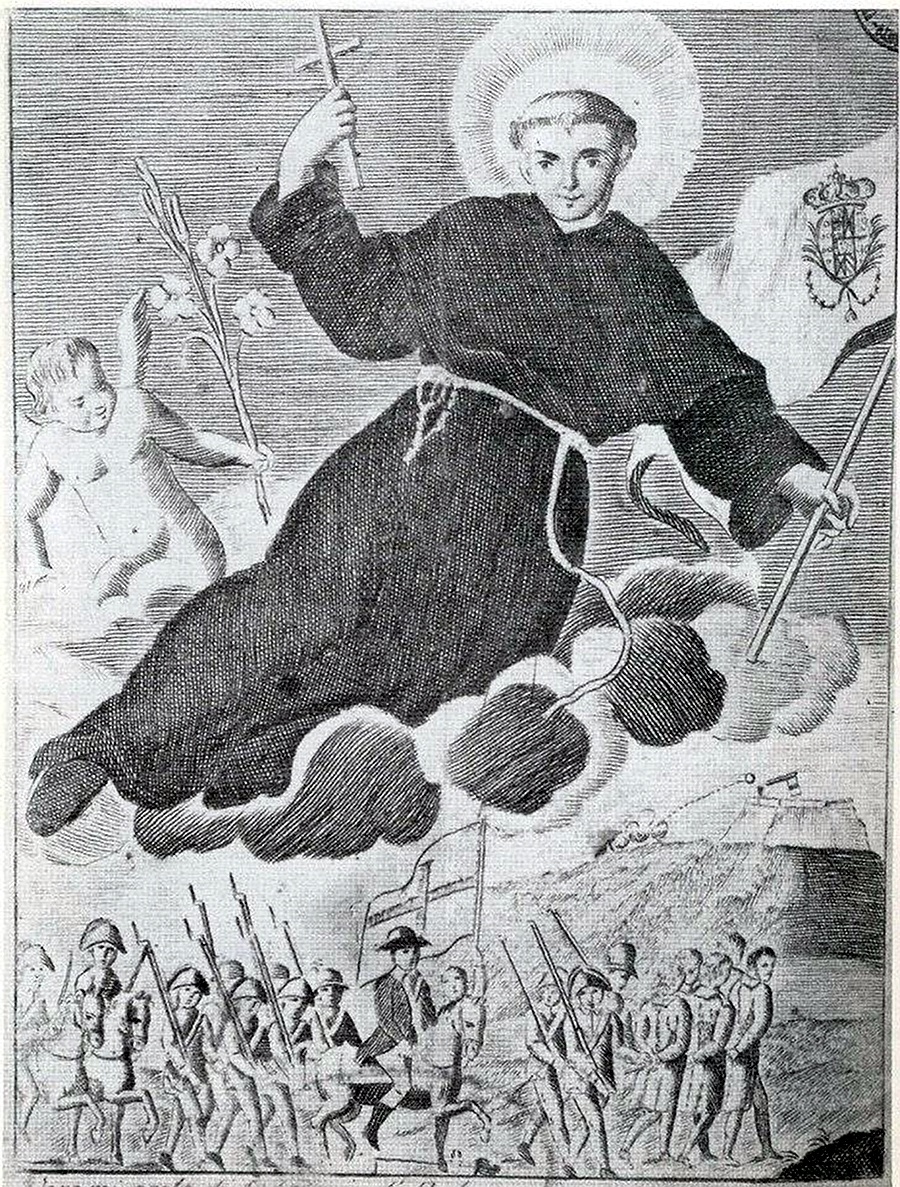
Popular contemporary print showing the miracle of the cannonade by Anthony of Padua who - according to popular belief - had protected cardinal Ruffo and the Sanfedista army and allowed a "miraculous shot" which brought down the flagpole of the republican flag on Castel Sant'Elmo during the final battle to enter the city.

The French invasion of the Kingdom of Naples had begun on 1 December 1798, and a popular revolt broke out, mainly in the towns, in the wake of the French advance. In Terra di Lavoro several towns revolted - Sessa Aurunca (demolished when the revolt was put down), Teano, Fondi, Castelforte and Itri - as did some in Abruzzi. When the victorious French force got close to Capua it signed the Sparanise Armistice of 13 January 1799 and the Bourbon regular army stopped fighting. In the following days, several fruitless negotiations took place. Several Campanian cities rose up against the French army, including Pomigliano d'Arco, captured and burned by the French, with many inhabitants executed. The Parthenopean Republic was then proclaimed.

In Naples itself, local "patriots" and French troops fought against Lazzaroni. In three days, between 8,000 and 10,000 Lazzaroni were killed. At the end of the battle, the French general Jean Étienne Championnet pressured Giuseppe Capece Zurlo, the Archbishop of Naples, to declare that the blood of St Januarius had liquefied at the moment of the French victory. From then on, the Republic was decidedly anti-clerical, with regalism and jurisdictionalism grafted onto it, intensifying the ideological conflict.

The counter-offensive against the French began in the south. Cardinal Fabrizio Ruffo, vicar-general of the exiled King Ferdinand, raised a volunteer army and at the start of June led it into the Principato Ultra. It was known as the Army of the Holy Faith in Our Lord Jesus Christ or the Sanfedisti for short. It ejected the Republic from all the towns of Calabria, Basilicata, and Apulia and en route executed many supporters of the Republic - for instance, at Potenza, bishop Giovanni Andrea Serrao was killed for publicly siding with the Jacobins (he had blessed a tree of liberty in 1793).

Between May and June most of the French forces in the area fled north, with only three corps left to defend Naples. Ruffo's army camped at Nola, where they were joined by British, Austrian and Russian contingents landed by Horatio Nelson on the coasts of Calabria and an Ottoman force (that Empire having joined the Second Coalition). Nelson also commanded an Anglo-Bourbon fleet blockading the coasts. Ruffo then moved from Nola to Somma Vesuviana and then Portici, capturing both and finally on 13 June Naples itself. Antonio Micheroux and Ruffo signed the peace agreement for the Kingdom, Captain Edward Foote RN for Britain, Admiral Henry Baillie for Russia and Acmet for the Ottomans. The last French soldiers then boarded a ship for Toulon.

Both moderate and Jacobin Neapolitan "patriots" had prepared a last stand at the castle in Naples, but reached an agreement with Ruffo to spare their lives and thus surrendered. A few days later several republicans were executed and in the following months a military junta appointed by Ferdinand (who had returned to Naples) tried the captured republicans, executing the ringleaders. Of around 8,000 prisoners, 124 were tried, 6 pardoned, 222 condemned to life imprisonment, 322 to lower sentences, 288 to deportation and 67 to exile. Republican symbols were destroyed and the remains of Masaniello in the Basilica del Carmine scattered (he had led a revolt in 1647 and had been seen by the Republicans as a forerunner of their state).

== 19th century ==
=== 1800-1808 ===
In spring 1800 Napoleon began his second Italian campaign, winning a decisive victory at the Battle of Marengo and reimposing military control over Italy which then lasted until his first fall in 1814. New revolts broke out in many Italian regions, culminating in a national uprising in 1809.

==== Piedmont, Valle d'Aosta and Liguria ====
Riots broke out when French troops left their garrisons to fight against Austria. Attacks on republicans resumed and peasant militias took control of whole areas. These riots were known as the "Lunga" in Tanaro, the "Diciotto" in the mid-Val Trompia, the "Becurio" between Giaveno and Turin, the "Data" and "Truppa" gangs in Canavese, and the "Cacciatori Violino" in the provinces of Mondovì and Cuneo.

In the April-June 1800 siege of Genoa the main anti-French unit was a 10,000 strong one recruited by the aristocrat Luigi Domenico Assereto - the revolt ended with many of the men of that unit being executed by firing squad.

In 1801 there were riots in Valle d'Aosta, breaking out when news reached that area of the French defeats on the Mincio. They began in Châtillon and spread as far as Aosta, where the French commander Merek was forced to surrender. Revolt also spread to Piedmont that year - in mid January rebels assaulted Ivrea, but were repelled, with 300 dead and wounded, and in March the Astigiano rose up, along with other revolts in the Ligurian vallies of the Bisagno and Polcevera.

==== Former duchies of Parma and Modena ====
With the French reconquest of northern Italy in 1801-02 the revolts against them resumed, initially in the Modenese (Modena, Sassuolo, San Felice) and later in the Reggiano. In the years that followed gangs of irregulars spread out across the territory and repeatedly caused trouble for French garrisons. In January 1806 a major revolt broke out in the land between Castellarano and Sassuolo.

In the former duchy of Parma and in Oltrepò Pavese, the first revolts broke out in 1805-1806, triggered by the mass levy of 6,000 men from the local population by the French The first city to rise up was Castel San Giovanni in December 1805, followed by the main towns (from Salsomaggiore to Pellegrino, from Pontremoli to Bobbio, from Castell'Arquato to Borgo Val di Taro). The insurgents' forces numbered in the thousands.

In the area around Parma the rebel leader was Giuseppe Brussardi, known as "Generale Mozzetta" and in the Piacentino Agostino Daturi (not De Torri as previously believed), known as "Foppiano". At the end of January 1806 France defeated the insurgents and set fire to the village of Mezzano Scotti di Bobbio, after which the revolt ended, followed by trials and death sentences.

==== Tuscany ====
On 15 October 1800 the French occupied Florence, Prato and Pistoia. From his exile in Vienna the Grand Duke set up a provisional government and the inhabitants of Arezzo took over its leadership. 7,000 men were raised under Giovan Battista Albergotti, a leader of the Viva Maria. The French got reinforcements from the fortress at Ancona and bombarded Arezzo, which surrendered on 19 October. The Monte di Pietà, churches and monasteries were all sacked and the French imposed a heavy war contribution, blew up the fortress and razed the city's two monumental gates. The revolt continued after Arezzo's fall, spreading as brigandage throughout the region. In 1801 a new revolt broke out in Valdarno and Val di Chiana, while Portoferraio's inhabitants resisted the French for 31 months, surrendering only at the express request of the Grand Duke.

==== Calabria ====
Napoleon conquered the Kingdom of Naples in 1806. The first attacks on French troops took place in March that year, in Calabria and Basilicata. In response, the occupiers began a manhunt and sacked six villages, including Soveria Mannelli. Further revolts occurred in April. In June, two ringleaders, Sciarpa and Panedigrano, attempted to foment another revolt in Calabria. They were joined by Fra Diavolo, who had set up his headquarters in Sora in the Terra di Lavoro, but also carried out raids in the South - with 600 men he landed at Amantea and took over the city. From their exile in Palermo the royal family decided to support the revolt by sending an army of 6,000 British soldiers led by General John Stuart. On 4 July Fra Diavolo and Stuart achieved their first victory. Subsequently, several villages were taken.

The French counter-offensive was entrusted to General André Masséna, Marshal of France, who had 14,000 soldiers. The repression began in August with the burning of Lauria, which resulted in the deaths of thousands of inhabitants. In October, a popular army of 3,000 men, led by Antonio Santoro, known as "King Coremme," occupied Acri. The French attacked and burned the city. Around the same time, Fra Diavolo was captured near Salerno; he was executed in Naples on November 11, 1806.

Amantea resisted from September 1806 until February 1807. The French lost 800 men, while Amantea lost 2,200 inhabitants. Subsequently, other villages capitulated: Longobardi (burned by the French), Belmonte, and Maratea (where a formal agreement was reached between the victors and the vanquished: the defeated were allowed to return to their homes upon swearing never to fight against the French again). In May 1807, Santoro and his men, and Nicola Gargiulo and his troops, occupied Crotone, which the French were only able to enter on 10 July. The last Calabrian cities to fall were Reggio and Scilla in February 1808.

==== Tirol ====
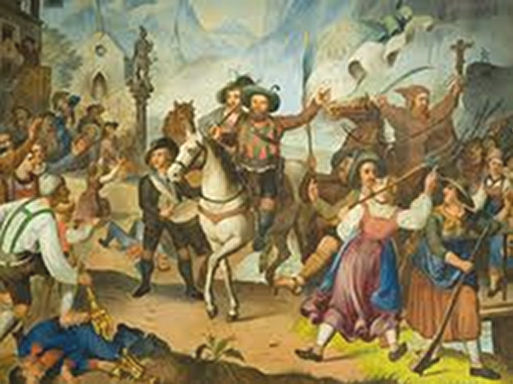
Popular painting of the time depicting Andreas Hofer on horseback in the centre, celebrated by the population armed with agricultural tools; at the bottom left, a commoner recovers golden religious furnishings from a killed French soldier; on the right, a monk brandishes a crucifix and a sabre; in the background, a church and a column with a statue of a saint.

In 1806, following Austria's defeat in the War of the Third Coalition, the Tyrol was annexed to the Kingdom of Bavaria. Three years later the king's minister Maximilian von Montgelas adopted anti-Christian measures, suppressing services, bell ringing, processions and religious weddings and funerals. This led to an underground church holding ceremonies in barns with the priests dressed as peasants to evade recognition. A revolt began on 9 April, led by Andreas Hofer, whose force rose from 400 to 18,000 over the course of the revolt. He won his first victories at Innsbruck and other cities in north Tyrol. The bitterest clashes were the Battles of Bergisel at the bottom of Mount Isel, the first at the end of May and the second in mid August, both rebel victories. In the second battle Hofer defeated marshal François Joseph Lefebvre, who was forced to flee. Encouraged by such success Trento rose up on 21 August, followed by Rovereto on 29 August. Towards the end of September the Italo-Franco-Bavarian counter offensive began and on 14 October the Austrian Empire renounced its claim on Tyrol in the Peace of Schönbrunn, leaving the Tyrol undefended.

The region was attacked from the north, east and south by Napoleon, who sent two armies, five battalions and two squadrons, determined to suppress the revolt. Faced with such a disproportionate force, Hofer considered surrendering to avoid unnecessary bloodshed, but the French rejected the request for an armistice. General Drouet attacked, with Trento and Lavis falling first, both with massacres of civilians. Hofer then counterattacked and won a victory in Val Passiria (November 14). The overwhelming Italian, Franco-Bavarian, and French forces prevailed. By early December, the situation had returned to normal. The French took revenge on the population: massacres were committed in Matrei, Sillian, in the Pustertal, and in Novacella (where all the houses were burned). Hofer, who had been hiding since early December, was captured on January 18, 1810, after being informed on. He was executed on February 20 in Mantua.

After the uprisings subsided, those responsible were brought to trial. Special military commissions worked until 1811. Dozens of death sentences were handed down, and hundreds of years of prison were imposed.

==== Other ====
The first revolts in Bolognese, Ferrarese and Romagna in this phase broke out in September 1800 and was put down by general Pino. In 1805 there was another people's movement in that area.

In October 1805, while French and Austrian forces faced off, the town of Crespino revolted, soon followed by Polesine, both in the Veneto. This revolt ended spontaneously when Austrian forces were recalled to the front, but France's reaction after victory was still merciless - early in 1806 Crespino's inhabitants were deprived of their citizenship and declared a "colonia" of stateless people, though on 11 January 1807 Napoleon issued a decree revoking that punishment.

In the Marche and Umbria the fortress of Civitella del Tronto resisted for months and when it fell on 21 May 1806 citizens and peasants accused of collaboration were massacred.

=== General rising of 1809 ===
Austria returned to the fight against Napoleon in April 1809 on joining the Fifth Coalition. Two army corps under Archduke John of Austria invaded northern Italy to face a Franco-Italian force under Eugène de Beauharnais. Just as in the 1790s, several areas of Italy rose up in revolt during the campaign.

In Lombardy the alpine departments and those of Lario rose up, followed by the territories of Brescia, Como and Sondrio. In the area around Mantua Ostiglia, Sermide, Castelvetro and Pavullo rose up, as did the areas bordering the Austrian Empire such as the Valtellina (where Corrado Juvalta, agent and imperial official in Teglio, was active) and the Val Camonica In the former duchy of Modena riots occurred in the Panaro department and at Spilamberto, Vignola, Sassuolo, Bobbio, Castelfranco Emilia, Samoggia, Maranello, Finale Emilia, Formigine and Pavullo.

The first uprisings in the Veneto were those in Lonigo, Zevio, Isola della Scala, Legnago, Vicenza, Badia Polesine, Rovigo. These spread until the whole Trentino nearby Asiago were also in revolt - that in Asiago broke out on 8 July 1809, considered the anniversary of the "Venetian revolt"". Next Feltre, Belluno, Bassano, Schio, and the departments of Adige, Piave, Bacchiglione, Adriatico and Tagliamento rebelled. It also spread through Verona and its nearby towns, the area around Padua and in Polesine.

In the Marche Loreto, Cingoli, Macerata, Osimo, Fabriano, Fermo and Ascoli rebelled. In Romagna and the areas around Ferrara and Bologna the existing discontent "due to excessive taxes, conscription, laws which - in their attempt to reform - had overthrown the whole former government" exploded after a decree of 10 April 1809 which significantly complicated the way of collecting tax on milled grain, to the point that all the millers along the Po stopped milling and there was a flour shortage. That shortage triggered the first uprisings.. In the Department of the Lower Po, the main towns (Bondeno, Comacchio, Copparo, Argenta, Portomaggiore) rose up, but the revolted ended early in November when news reached the rebels of the Treaty of Schönbrunn between France and Austria. In the Department of the Reno popular riots broke out in Cento, Minerbio, Budrio, Galliera, Castel San Pietro, Molinella, Imola, Bazzano, Porretta, Loiano, Pianoro, San Giovanni in Persiceto, Castiglione dei Pepoli and Vergato.

==== Eastern Adriatic ====
In Istria and Dalmatia, Venetian possessions in the eastern Adriatic which had been part of the Napoleonic Kingdom of Italy after the Peace of Pressburg (1805), the Dalmatian campaign of 1809 was in full swing in the spring, and fighting continued in the summer, where the Austrians, despite their losses in the north, proceeded to take most of the main towns from the French - on July 21 Sebenico, on August 2 Split, then Hvar, and Rovinj. Zadar was blockaded until an armistice was signed at the turn of August.

After the Austrians were defeated in the July Battle of Wagram, the Illyrian Provinces were created by the Treaty of Schönbrunn on 14 October 1809, and the Austrians retreated.

=== 1810-1814 ===
In 1814 the failure of the Russian campaign led to one last Italian uprising, this time in Upper Lazio.

== Casualties ==
There are no full calculations on those killed during the revolts, though the clashes which caused the highest casualties were:

- the defence of Naples (1799) - 10,000 dead lazzaroni (Note: Thiéboult calculates that in 1799 alone 60,000 rebels were killed in the Kingdom of Naples.)
- at San Severo (25 February 1799) - 3,000 rebels fell
- at Andria (23 March 1799) - 4,000 rebels, of which 550 were put to the sword
- at Amantea 2,200 rebels fell
- Mondovì (22 May 1799) and Isernia - 1,500 fell

== Bibliography (in Italian) ==
- Crollalanza, Giovanni Battista di (1867). Storia del contado di Chiavenna. Milano: Muggiani.
- Lemmi, Francesco (1906). Le origini del Risorgimento (1789-1815). Milano: Hoepli.
- Patrizio Antolini (1922). Il brigantaggio nel dipartimento del basso PO - 1809. Ferrara: Stab. Tip. G. Bresciani.
- Rodolico, Niccolò (1926). Il popolo agli inizi del Risorgimento nell'Italia meridionale (1798-1801). Firenze: Le Monnier.
- Lumbroso, Giacomo (1932). I moti popolari contro i francesi alla fine del secolo XVIII (1796-1800). Firenze: Le Monnier.
- J. Godechot, La controrivoluzione. Dottrina e azione (1789-1804), Mursia, Milano 1988 (ed. or. Paris 1961)
- Furet, François; Richet, Denis (2004) [1965]. La Rivoluzione francese (special edition for Corriere della Sera, "Storia Universale", vol. 15 ed.).
- P. Villani, «Dal 1748 al 1815» in La storiografia italiana negli ultimi vent'anni, Milano 1973
- V. E. Giuntella, «La Rivoluzione francese e l'Impero napoleonico», in AA. VV., Bibliografia dell'età del Risorgimento, Olschki Firenze 1974
- Leoni, Francesco (1975). Storia della Controrivoluzione in Italia (1789-1859). Napoli: Guida.
- Capra, Carlo (1978). L'età rivoluzionaria e napoleonica in Italia (1796-1815). Torino: Loescher.
- De Felice, Renzo (1990). Il triennio giacobino in Italia (1796-1799). Roma: Bonacci. ISBN 88-7573-212-4.
- AA.VV. (1992). Le insorgenze antifrancesi in Italia nel triennio giacobino (1796-1799). Roma: Apes. ISBN 88-7233-003-3.
- Viglione, Massimo (1995). La "Vandea italiana". Roma: Effedieffe.
- Petrucci, Sandro (1996). Insorgenti marchigiani. Il Trattato di Tolentino e i moti antifrancesi del 1797. Macerata: Sico.
- Sanguinetti, Oscar (1996). Le insorgenze contro-rivoluzionarie in Lombardia. Piacenza: Cristianità.
- Agnoli, Francesco Mario (1996). Insorgenze. Controrivoluzione in Italia. Pessano con Bornago: Mimep-Docete.
- Agnoli, Francesco Mario (1998). Le Pasque veronesi: quando Verona insorse contro Napoleone. Rimini: Il Cerchio.
- Agnoli, Francesco Mario (1999). 1799: La Grande Insorgenza. Napoli: Controcorrente.
- Viglione, Massimo (1999). Le insorgenze. Rivoluzione & controrivoluzione in Italia (1792-1815). Milano: Ares.
- Viglione, Massimo (1999). Rivolte dimenticate: le insorgenze degli italiani dalle origini al 1815. Roma: Città Nuova.
- AA.VV. (1999). Folle controrivoluzionarie. Le insorgenze popolari nell'Italia giacobina e napoleonica. Roma: Carocci. ISBN 88-430-1403-X.
- Agnoli, Francesco Mario (2003). Le insorgenze antigiacobine in Italia. 1796-1815. Rimini: Il Cerchio.
- Topi, Luca (2003). "C'est absolumment la Vandée". L'insorgenza del Dipartimento del Circeo (1798-1799). Milano: FrancoAngeli. ISBN 88-464-4666-6.
- Giorgio Enrico Cavallo, La tirannia della libertà: il Piemonte dai Savoia a Napoleone, Collegno, Chiaramonte, 2016.

== External links (in Italian) ==
- "Storia e identità. Annali italiani online".
- "Documenti sulle insorgenze antigiacobine in Romagna".
