= Jurisdictionalism =

Jurisdictionalism is a political maneuver intended to extend the state's jurisdiction and control over the life and organization of the Church, namely the parallel legal structure consisting of ecclesiastical rights and privileges. Specifically, it can be defined as a current of thought and a political attitude aiming to affirm the authority of the laical jurisdiction over the ecclesiastical one. Fundamental tools of jurisdictionalism (also called regalism) were the placet and the exequatur, by which the State allowed or denied the publishing and implementation of orders from the Pope or other national ecclesiastical authorities, and the nomina ai benefici ("nomination to benefits"), to control the appointment of ecclesiastical charges. Besides these instruments of control, jurisdictionalism also implied the State's direct intervention on ecclesiastical matters such as the age and motives of people wishing to become monks, the usefulness of convents and contemplative religious orders (which were largely abolished), the number of religious festivities, the clergy's privileges and immunities, and the formation of priests.

== History ==
This policy, developed around the 18th century, was followed by some of the so-called “enlightened monarchs”, such as Maria Theresa of Habsburg and Joseph II of Habsburg, and others, especially after the events in Northern Europe following the Protestant Reformation, of which they shared the motives but not the doctrine.

In particular, such a policy was aimed at opposing:

- the right of asylum, namely the acknowledgement of immunity to whoever took refuge in a convent or monastery;
- the power of ecclesiastical courts to pass judgement on crimes involving religious people;
- the clergy's fiscal privileges

Jurisdictionalism, partly predating Enlightenment and partly developing parallelly to it, questioned the Inquisition, the Church's traditional monopoly on education or book censorship, and drastically reduced the importance of canon law – theretofore the universal law of Catholic states – in the context of the State.

The State tried to put limits to the so-called mortmain, namely the possession of real estate by the Church and religious corporations; some religious orders were either reformed or abolished; attempts were made to reduce churchly interferences in temporal matters; subjects were allowed to appeal to the monarch in case of ecclesiastical sentences and judgements.

== See also ==
- Josephinism
- Separation of church and state
- Anticurialism
- Universal power
