= Magione =

- Comune
- Comune di Magione
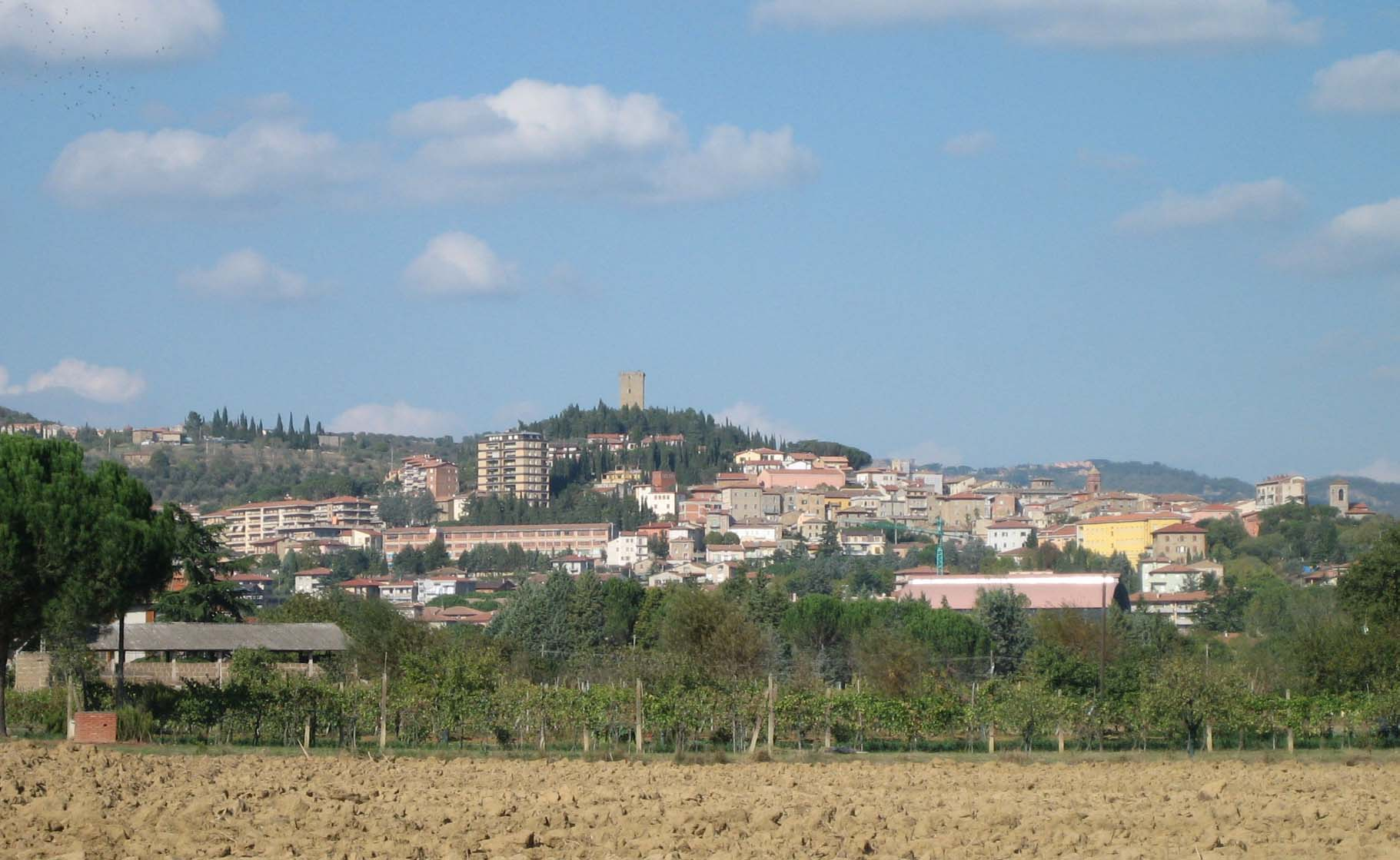
- View of Magione

- Coat of arms

- Location within Italy Location within Umbria
- Coordinates: 43.142764°N 12.205273°E
- Country: Italy
- Region: Umbria
- Province: Perugia (PG)

Government
  - Mayor: Massimo Alunni Proietti (Centre-Left)

Area
  - Total: 129.73 km^{2} (50.09 sq mi)
- Elevation: 299 m (981 ft)

Population (1 January 2025)
  - Total: 14,680
  - Density: 113.2/km^{2} (293.1/sq mi)
- Demonym: Magionesi
- Time zone: UTC+1 (CET)
  - Summer (DST): UTC+2 (CEST)
- Postal code: 06063
- Dialing code: 075
- Website: Official website

Magione (Italian pronunciation: [maˈdʒoːne]; formerly Villa Carpine until the 14th century) is a municipality in the Province of Perugia in the Italian region Umbria, located about 15 km west of Perugia.

== Etymology ==
The name Magione derives from the castle established by the Knights Hospitaller, who are said to have called their convent Maison in their own language.

Until the 14th century the settlement was known as Villa di Pian di Carpine, or Villa Carpine, a name derived from the hornbeam tree (Carpinus betulus), which grew abundantly in the surrounding area.

== History ==
Villa Carpine had a hospital attested as early as 1101, though located somewhat to the south of the present town.

The castle of Carpine was destroyed in 1280 by order of the magistrates of Perugia.

Between 1293 and 1297 the fortified center of Montecolognola was constructed by order of Perugia. Although the castle was built, the population remained largely in the original settlement of Pian di Carpine, and from 1297 until 1644 the two centers existed as distinct but interconnected communities under a shared system.

The present settlement arose on the site of a Templar establishment shortly after the suppression of the order in the early 14th century. The Templar complex was subsequently occupied by the Canons of the Holy Sepulchre, and later by a Basilian abbey.

In 1312 the complex passed to the Knights Hospitaller, and the name Magione came into use. During the Middle Ages the settlement was repeatedly involved in conflicts, suffering attacks from Perugia, Cortona, Arezzo and Florence.

In 1502, at a castle in Magione, there was a notable gathering of nobles and lords from nearby cities who formed a defensive and offensive league against Cesare Borgia, son of Pope Alexander VI. Among those present were Giampaolo Baglioni of Perugia, Oliverotto da Fermo, Giovanni II Bentivoglio, Antonio da Venafro, Paolo Orsini, Pandolfo Petrucci, and Vitellozzo Vitelli. The event became known as the Magione conspiracy.

An attempt to break away from Perugia in 1540 resulted instead in submission to Papal rule.

In the 17th century the community of Pian di Carpine was formally separated from Montecolognola.

In 1643 troops of the Grand Duchy of Tuscany were stationed there for two months, facing papal forces encamped at Corciano. In 1734 Charles III of Spain stayed in the abbey palace.

In 1701, Magione was a feudal domain of the Knights of Malta.

In 1798 the inhabitants rebelled against the French, and the town suffered killings and looting, followed by further sackings in the same year by forces from Arezzo.

In 1799 Magione became the centre of operations for the anti-French Catholic Army. During the Roman Republic period it was included in the Department of Passignano.

From 1820 Magione became the administrative centre of the surrounding territory, replacing Passignano.

In the mid-19th century Magione had a population of 4,398 inhabitants, of whom 1,228 lived in the town and its immediate surroundings, while the remainder resided in rural areas.

== Geography ==
Magione stands on a moderately elevated and somewhat steep hill to the east of Lake Trasimeno, which is not directly visible from the town due to higher intervening hills. It is crossed by the road connecting Perugia to Florence, and lies 11 miles (18 km) from Perugia, 15 miles (24 km) from Cortona, 35 miles (56 km) from Arezzo, and 75 miles (121 km) from Florence.

Magione borders the following municipalities: Castiglione del Lago, Corciano, Panicale, Passignano sul Trasimeno, Perugia, Tuoro sul Trasimeno, and Umbertide. It is located on the eastern shore of Lake Trasimeno.

To the east is the Autodromo dell'Umbria, an operating automobile and motorcycle circuit of the national level.

=== Subdivisions ===
The municipality includes the localities of Agello, Antria, Caligiana, Canale, Col di Selva, Collesanto, Il Colle, La Valle, Le Piagge, Le Rocce, Magione, Monte del Lago, Monte Melino, Montesperello, Montecolognola, Osteria San Martino, San Feliciano, San Savino, Sant'Arcangelo, Soccorso, Torricella, Valle Lupina, Vignaia, Villa.

In 2021, 1,654 people lived in rural dispersed dwellings not assigned to any named locality. At the time, the most populous locality was Magione proper (6,607).

== Economy ==
In the 19th century the local economy included the production of pottery, which was traded in significant quantities, as well as agriculture and livestock breeding.

== Religion and culture ==
The main parish church is dedicated to San Giovanni Battista and is known as the Chiesa Nuova. Another important church is dedicated to the Madonna delle Grazie, whose feast is celebrated on the first Sunday of May.

Religious buildings in the wider territory include churches in various parishes, and the abbey near Magione, a large crenellated complex historically associated with important political events.

=== Castle of the Knights of Malta ===
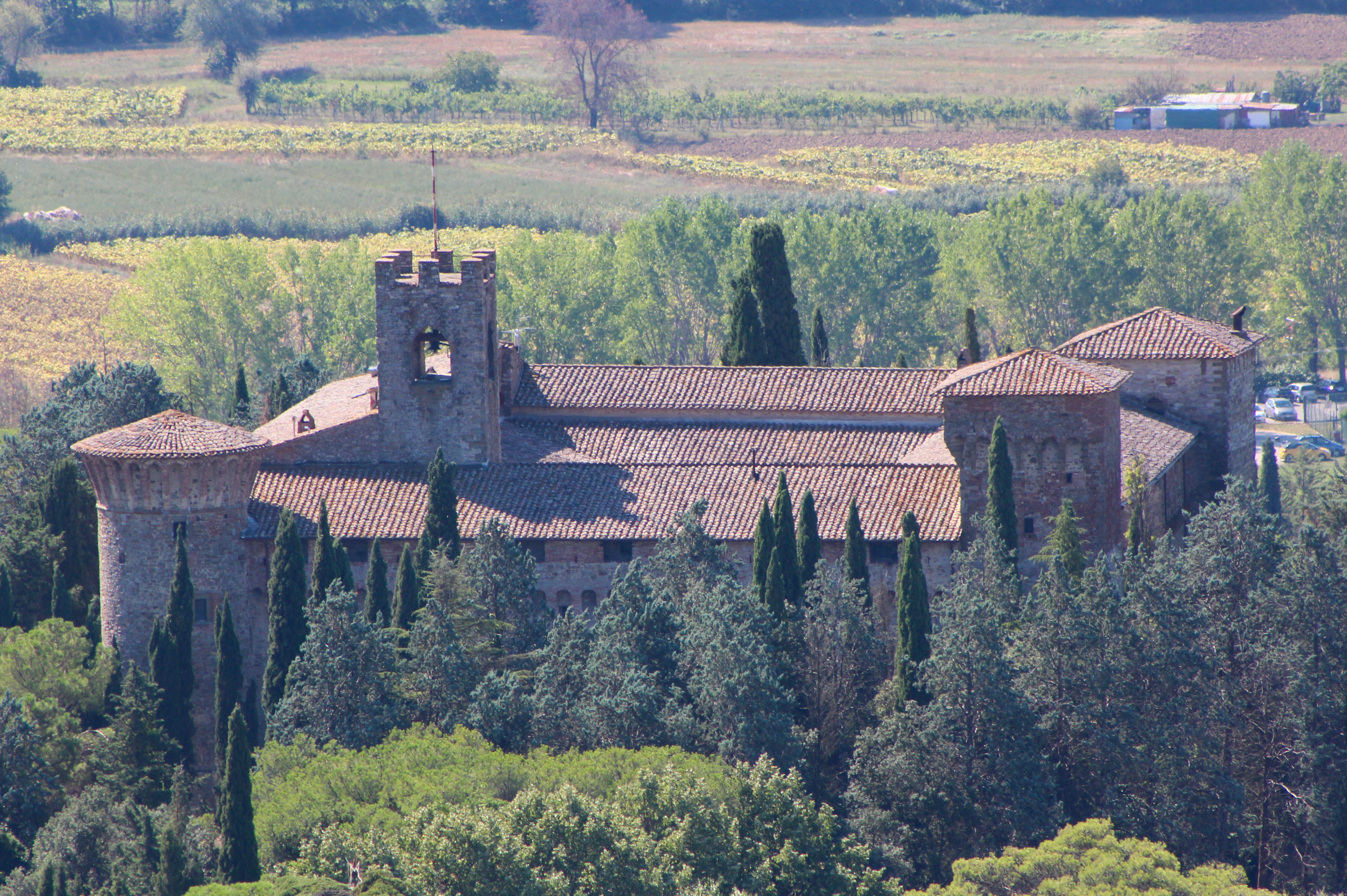
The fortified 12th-century complex of the Knights Hospitaller

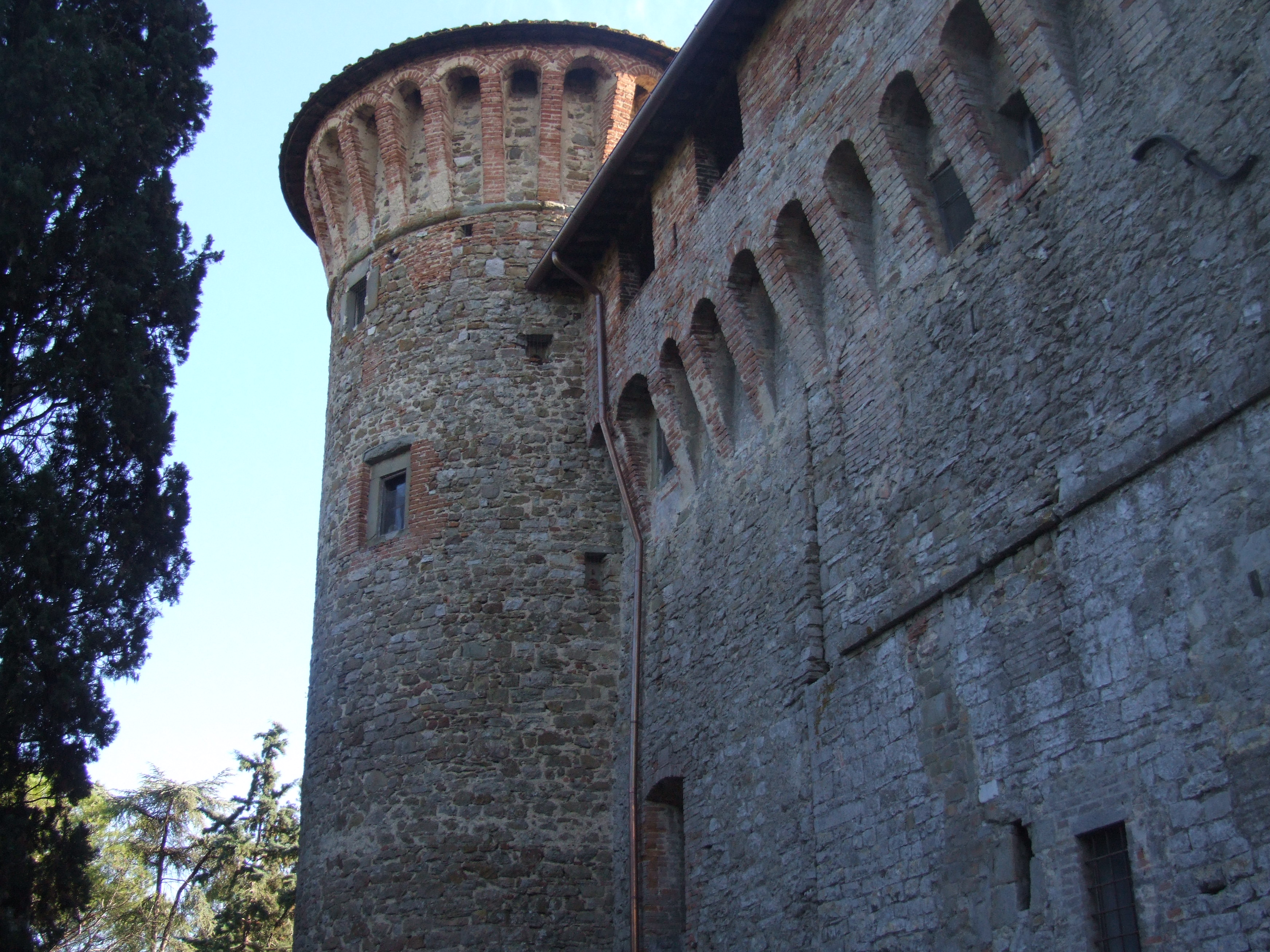
Circular tower and defensive walls of the castle, highlighting the brick corbelled crown

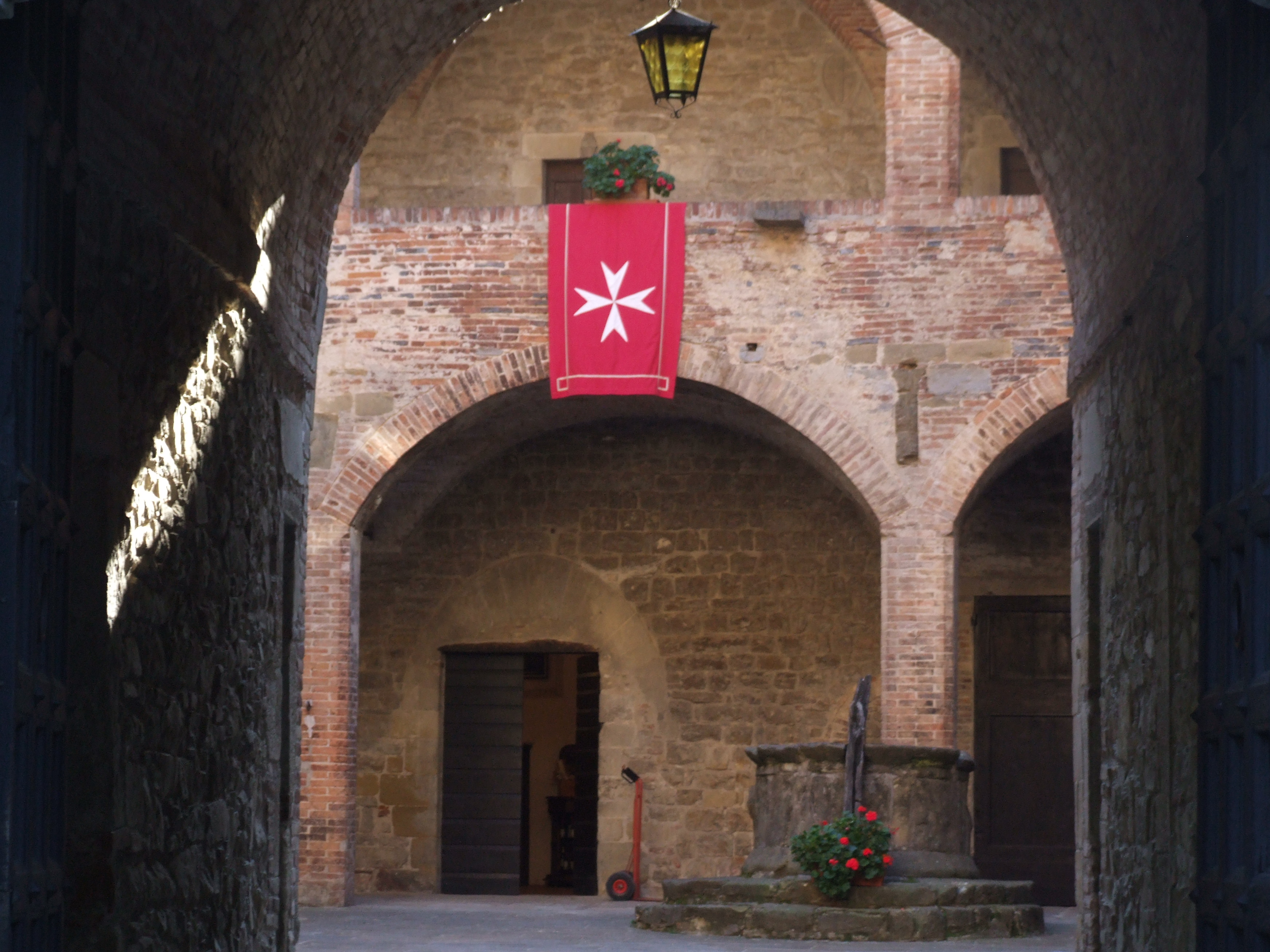
Inner courtyard of the castle, with arcaded loggias and central wellhead

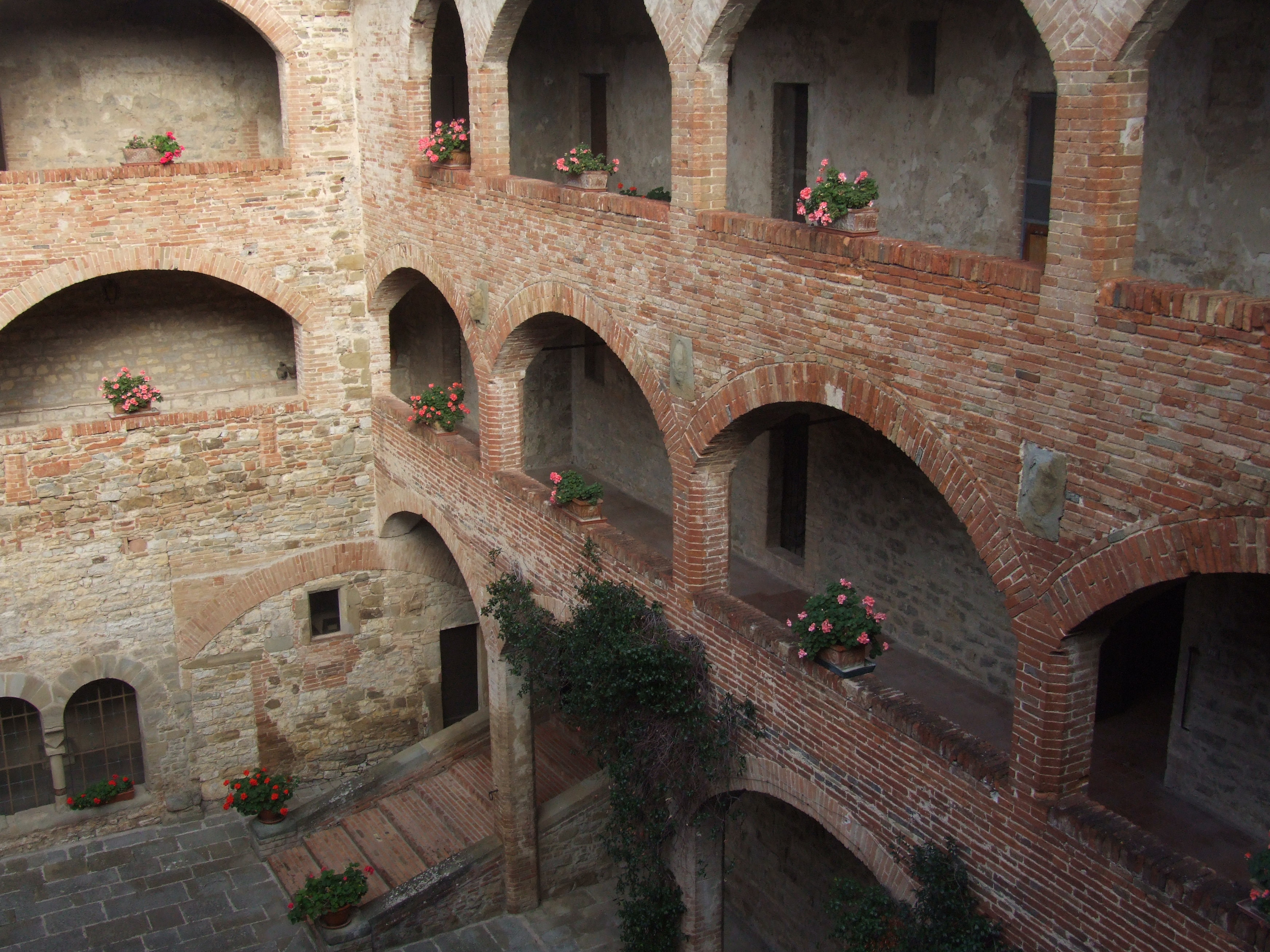
Arcaded inner courtyard of the castle

The Castle of the Knights of Malta originated as a hospital of the Knights Hospitaller, dedicated to Saint John the Baptist, and was built in the mid-12th century near an important route linking Perugia and Tuscany. Although it has sometimes been attributed to the Knights Templar, documentary evidence indicates continuous ownership by the Hospitallers.

In March 1261 the complex was largely destroyed by forces of the municipality of Perugia, leaving only parts of the church, the base of the bell tower, and sections of what is now the western wing. It was rebuilt in the later 13th century and expanded in 1367 with the addition of an eastern wing. Further works in 1471 included the construction of a loggia above the church and possibly a circular tower near the present entrance.

During the 16th century additional loggias were built, forming those still visible on three sides of the internal courtyard. Around this period, or shortly before, frescoes depicting the Nativity and a composition with the Virgin, Saint John the Baptist, and Saint James were painted within the church. Minor works continued in 1644, including the construction of a sandstone wellhead over an existing cistern.

The structure later came to be known locally as the Badia, a name that became established when the term Magione, once used for the complex, came to designate the nearby settlement instead.

=== Castle of Zocco ===
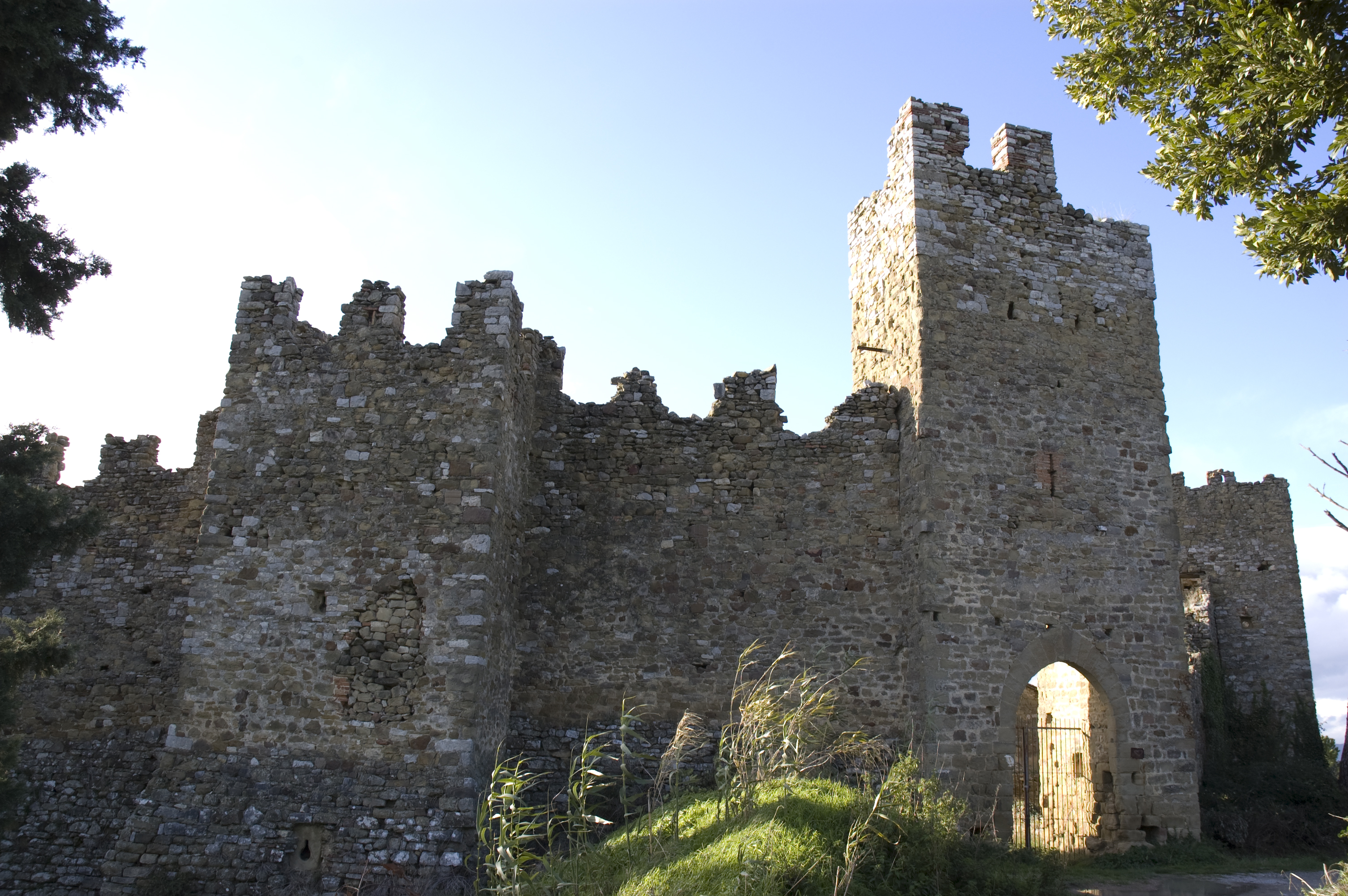
Castello di Zocco

The Castle of Zocco, built in 1274, was one of the principal military strongholds in the Lake Trasimeno area, originally featuring seven towers, of which five survive, along with three gates and a substantial circuit of walls. Initially described as a villa with around 150 inhabitants, it was strengthened in 1403, after which it took on the designation of castrum.

In 1456 it provided refuge to large numbers of inhabitants of Perugia fleeing a severe epidemic. In 1479 it was besieged by Florentine troops. In 1486 a well was constructed within the castle to supply the garrison. From the 16th century the castle entered a period of gradual decline, attributed in part to rising water levels that brought it closer to the lake shore. A small harbor developed nearby, supporting a fishing community.

In the early 20th century the castle was inhabited by a small community of farmers. It later became the property of the Palombaro family of Rome. The castle also includes the church of San Macario, where an ancient Latin inscription was once visible beside a painted image of a lady.

=== Rocca Monaldi ===
Rocca Monaldi was most likely built in the 14th century and later modified for residential use. The structure is enclosed by an imposing outer defensive wall, with additional stretches of fortification protecting the central keep. Between the defensive walls stands the seigneurial residence. The fortress is attributed to Marco di Ceccolo Piccinino and was originally known as Rocca del conte Angelo, from Angelo di Giacomo Piccinino, a relative who resided there. On 8 June 1479 it suffered significant damage during an attack by Florentine troops.

In the 16th century the property passed first to the Baglioni family and then to the Monaldi family. From this period onward the fortress took the name Rocca Monaldi, reflecting the family that held it until the early 20th century. In the early 20th century the marchioness Nathan Monaldi hosted social gatherings and small theatrical performances within the fortress. The property is now owned by the Veracchi family.

== Notable people ==
Magione is associated with several notable figures. Niccolò Piccinino, a prominent 15th-century military leader, was born in the nearby area of Villa Antria. Among later figures are Vincenzo Massini, a parish priest and preacher; Stanislao Nicolai, a doctor of law; Benedetto Rinaldi, noted for his medical knowledge; Ariodante Fabretti, an archaeologist; and Raffaele Marchesi, author of works recognized in Italy and abroad.

Among the principal families recorded in the 19th century are the Massini, Nicolai, Casini, and Rinaldi.

Giovanni da Pian del Carpine was a 13th-century Franciscan friar and explorer who was born in the area of present-day Magione.
