= Liber beneficiorum =

A Liber beneficiorum ("Book of Benefice") is a register concerning beneficials, benefactors, properties and privileges.

== Bibliography ==
- Liber beneficiorum (w:) Encyklopedia WIEM
- Liber beneficiorum (w:) W. Kopaliński, Słownik wyrazów obcych i zwrotów obcojęzycznych
- Z. Gloger, Księga rzeczy polskich, Lwów 1896, s. 215
