= Lake Trasimeno =

Lake in Italy

Lake Trasimene
- Lago Trasimeno (Italian)

- Location within Umbria
- Location: Umbria, Italy
- Coordinates: 43.14°N 12.10°E
- Type: cryptorheic, also drained by canal
- Basin countries: Italy
- Surface area: 128 km^{2} (49 sq mi)
- Average depth: 4–5 m (13–16 ft)
- Max. depth: 6 m (20 ft)
- Surface elevation: 258 m (846 ft)
- Islands: 3 (Isola Polvese, Isola Maggiore, Isola Minore)
- Website: www.lagotrasimeno.net

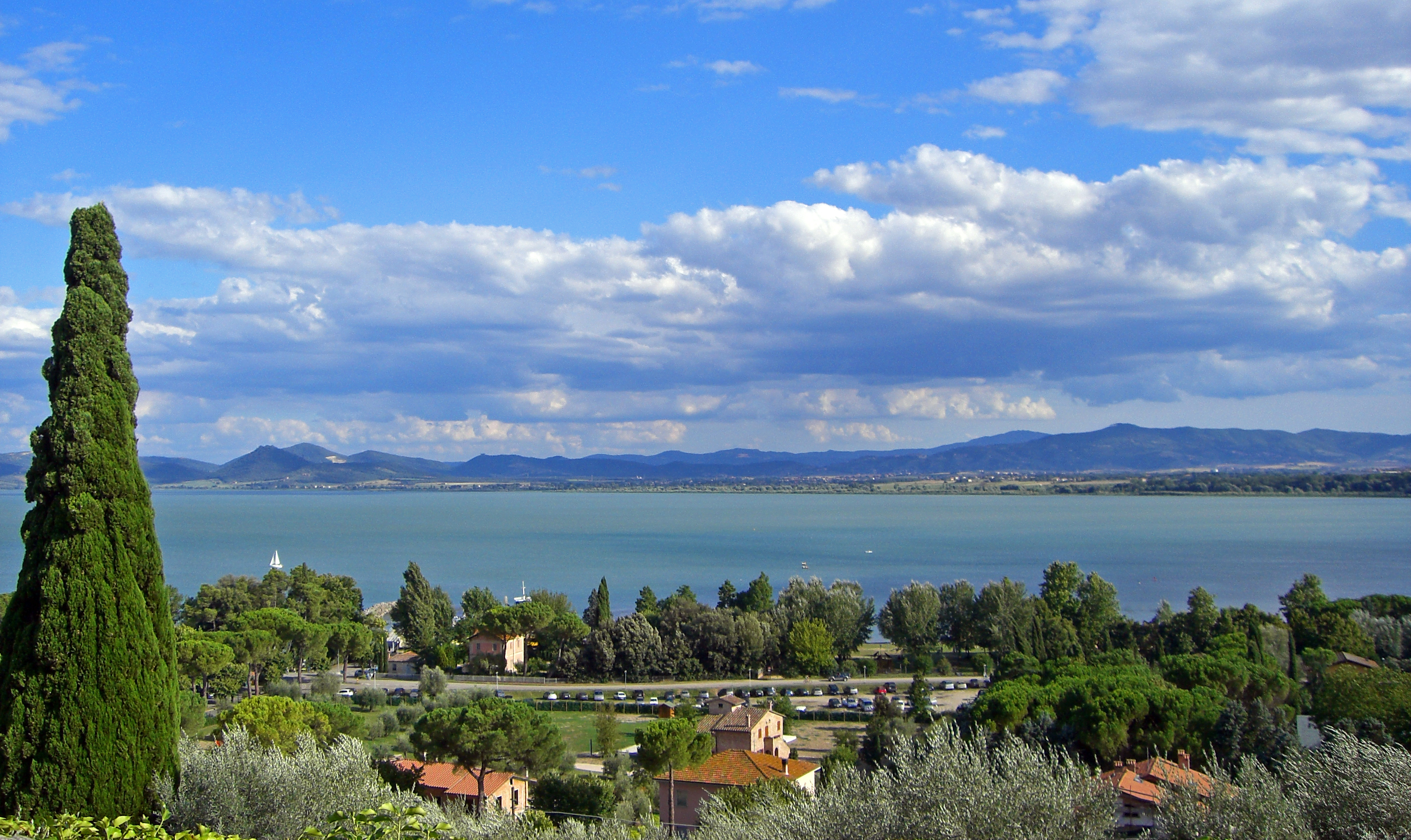
The lake seen from Castiglione del Lago

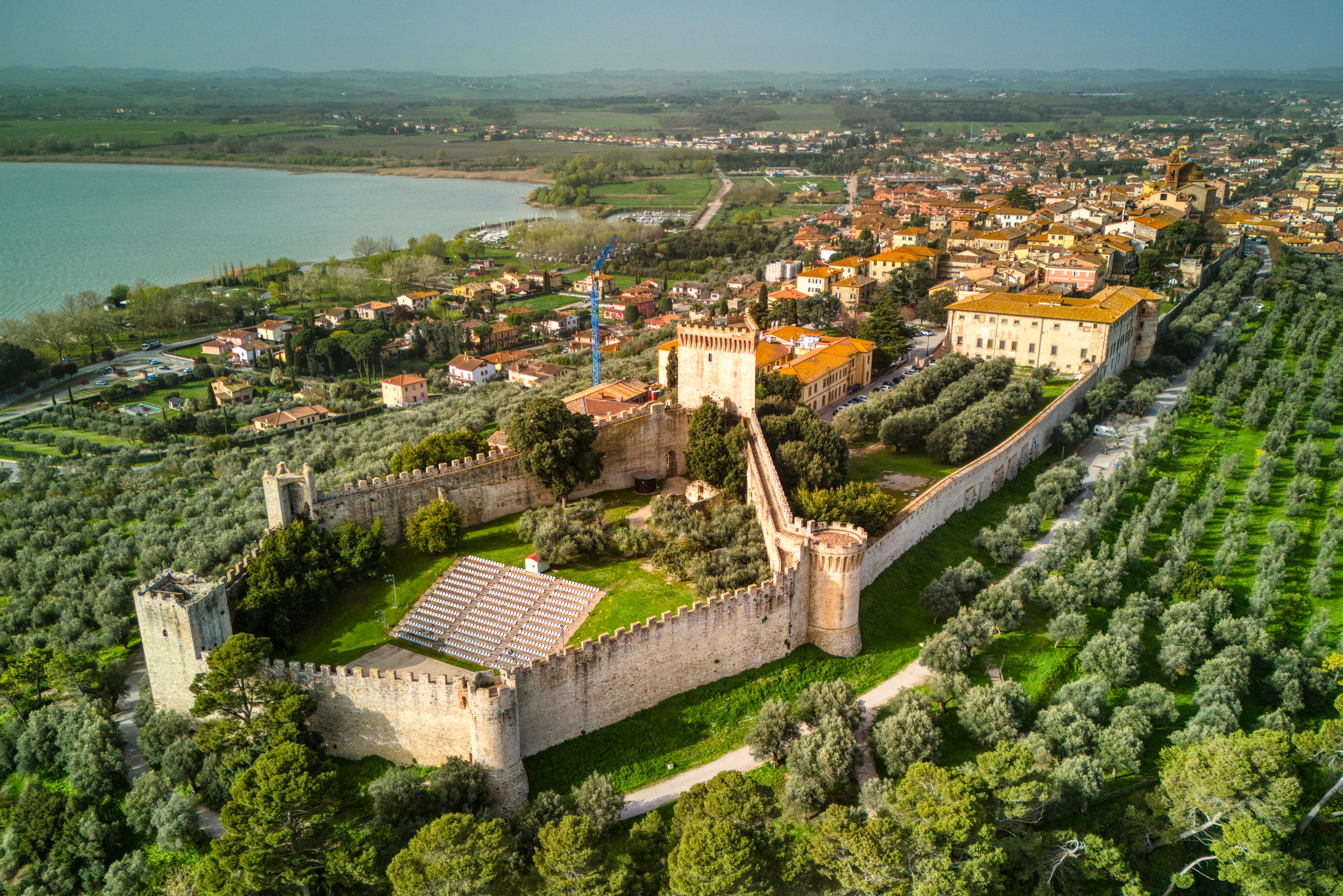
Fortress and lake, Castiglione

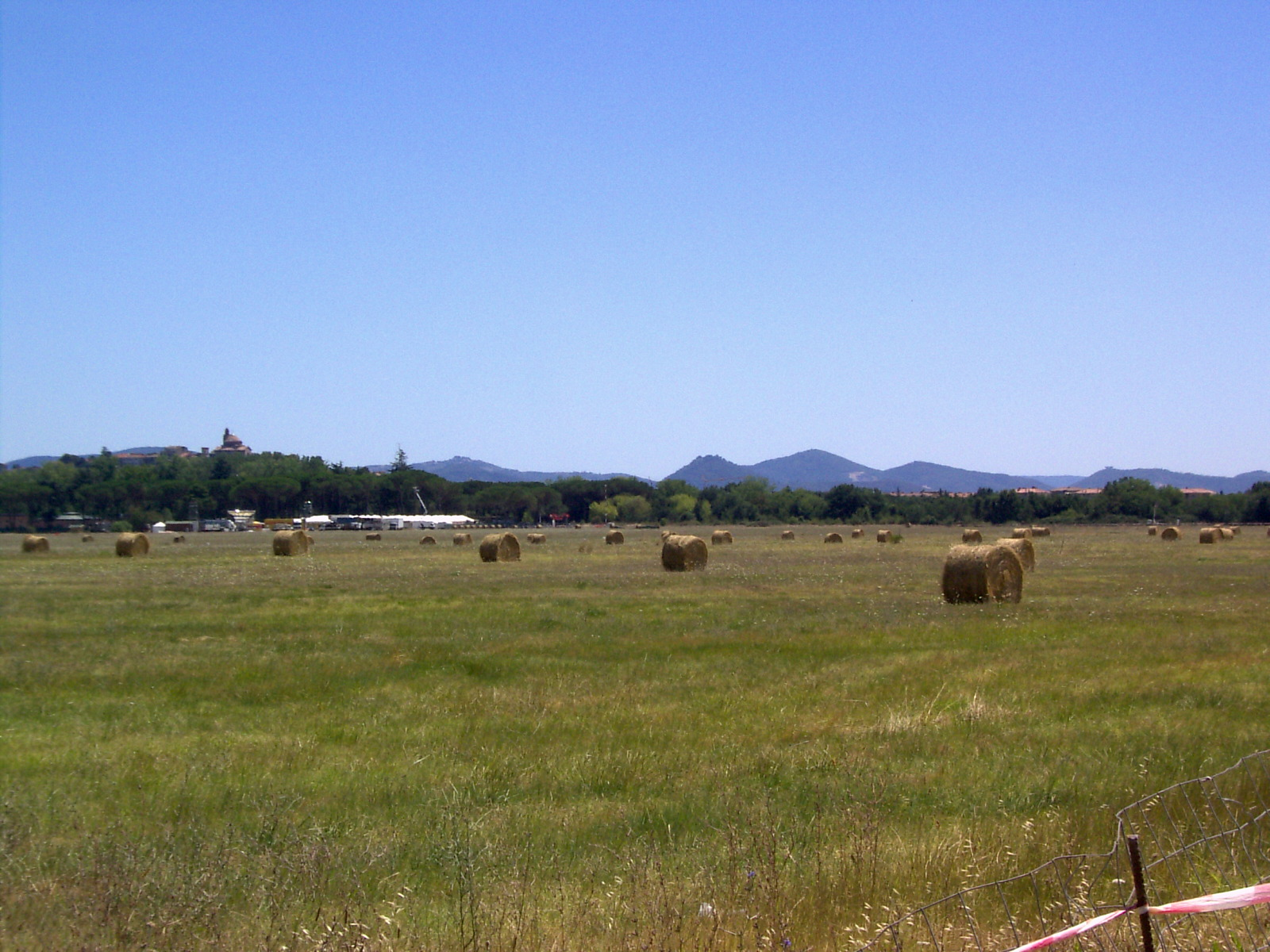
Eleuteri and behind, Castiglione del Lago

Lake Trasimene (Italian: Lago Trasimeno [ˈlaːɡo traziˈmɛːno]; Latin: Trasumennus; Etruscan: Tarśmina), is a lake in the province of Perugia, in the Umbria region of Italy on the border with Tuscany. The lake has a surface area of 128 km^{2} (49.4 sq mi), making it the fourth largest in Italy, slightly smaller than Lake Como. Only two minor streams flow directly into the Lake and none flows out. The water level of the lake fluctuates significantly according to rainfall levels and the seasonal demands from the towns, villages and farms near the shore.

== Description ==
Trasimene is shallow, muddy, and rich in fish, including pike, carp, and tench. During the last 10 years it has been 5 meters deep, on average. Lake Trasimene is an apparently endorheic body of water with no natural above-ground outlet. However, the Romans dug an artificial drainage tunnel in the San Savino area, which was restored in the Renaissance; a modern canal, the Emissario del Trasimeno, was built in 1898, flowing into the Caina, the Nestore, and eventually the Tiber.

The shallow waters meant that malarial mosquitoes prospered. To combat malaria, some mosquito larvae-eating fish were imported from the United States during the 1950s. These fish are widely scattered, and some live in the lakes near Trasimene. Although billions of larvae are eaten, there are still many mosquitoes and other insects.

The lake's water quality is still very good, as a study by conservation group Italia Nostra showed in 2005. This is believed to be largely due to the small population and a lack of large farms in the area.

A proposal to drain the lake to solve the problems of malaria and depth changes was rejected. At the end of the 19th century, the level changes were solved by building a channel near San Feliciano. This also lessened the malaria problem.

=== Origins and early history ===
The lake environment of Lake Trasimene dates back to the Middle Pleistocene (between 1.4 and 0.7 million years ago) but the geological history of the Trasimene area began a few million years earlier, in the Miocene (13 million years ago).

Historically, Trasimene was known as the Lake of Perugia, being important for northwestern Umbria. In prehistoric times, this lake extended almost to Perugia. Trasimene is a mythological figure, joined with Agilla, a nymph born in Agello, now a hill midway between Perugia and Trasimene, formerly an island in the lake.

The first civilization to inhabit this area was the Etruscans; three of the main Etruscan cities as Perugia in Umbria, Chiusi and Cortona in [Tuscany], are within 20 kilometres (12 mi) of the Trasimene Lake. Little physical evidence remains from the period of Etruscan or later Roman settlement. Castiglione del Lago has some Roman ruins and its main streets are structured like a chessboard in the Roman style.

The Battle of Lake Trasimene occurred on the northern shore of the lake in June 217 B.C. during the Second Punic War. The exact location of the battle is unknown because the lake then extended further north; the battle was fought in the territory of Tuoro sul Trasimeno near the hills overlooking the lake. Near Cortona is a place called 'Ossaia', in Italian meaning ossuary. Another place with reference to the battle is the place named Sanguineto, whose name is connected with the Italian term sangue meaning "blood" or, probably, "bloody place."

=== Local climate ===
The Trasimene climate is fairly warm, with moderate winters. Summers can be very warm and humid, but in general the lake moderates the climate both in cold and warm conditions because even shallow water gives a moderate thermic inertia. From May to September, the temperature is high enough to allow swimming. In 1929, a cold winter froze the whole of the lake's surface, and cars could be driven over the ice. Cold winters in 1957, 1985 and 2002 caused heavy damage to the olive trees nearby. A less severe freeze happened in 1991. Given the latitude of the lake, freezing remains a rare occurrence.

=== Water level ===
The water level of the lake is very dependent on the amount of seasonal rain and can change significantly from one year to the other. The water level is usually at its minimum level after summer (in September or October) and at its highest during spring (in April or May).

Trasimene has high hills to the east, which help to capture rain and partially protect the lake from cold eastern winds. Most of the water in the lake comes from the network of streams on the western side of the lake. The reference water level of the lake is set at 257.33 AMSL. This level corresponds to a maximum depth of around 6m. Actions are planned to reduce the water level when it climbs above 257.60 AMSL, but since the maximum level was set the lake has reached that height only occasionally.

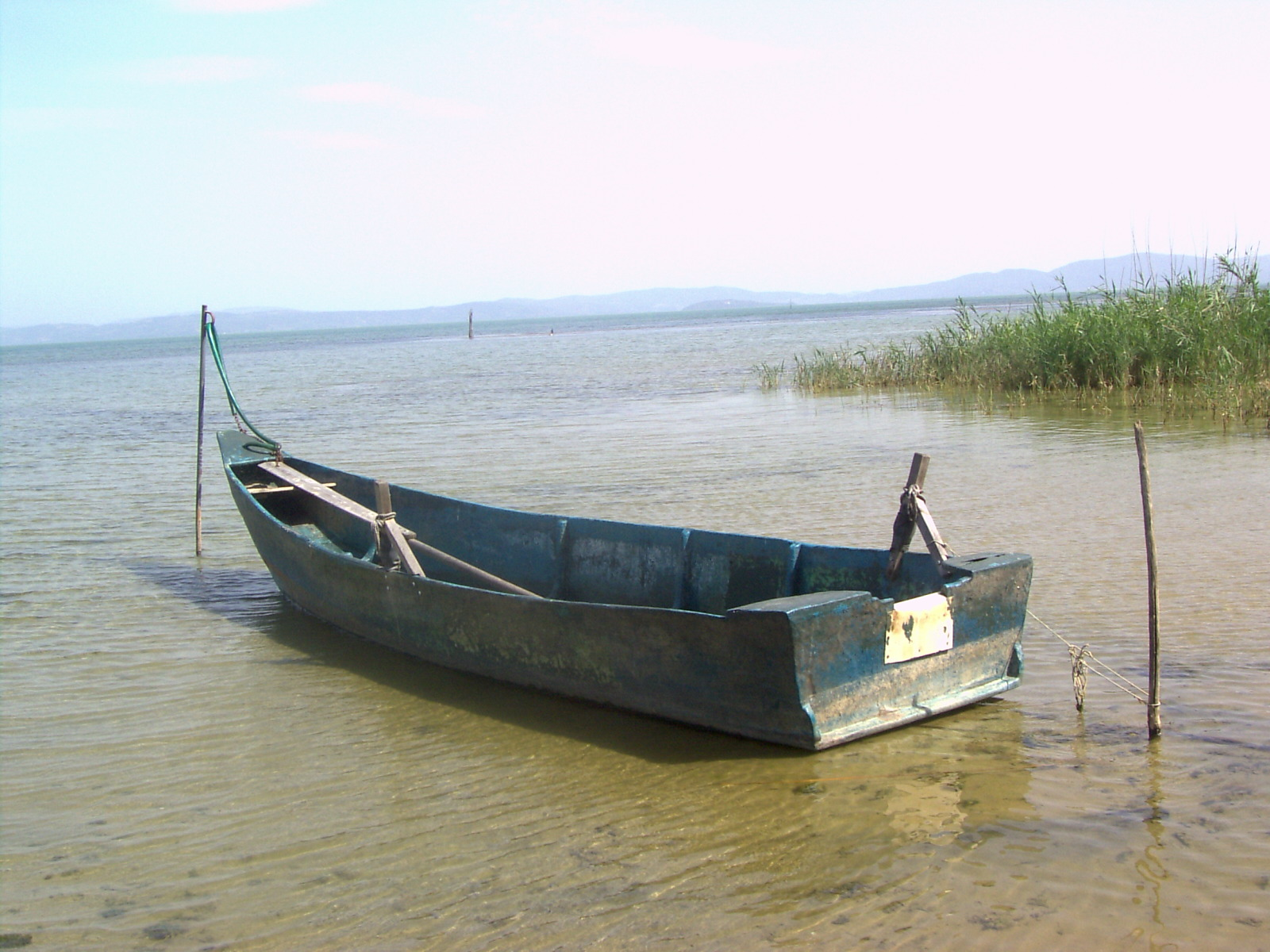
July 2007, a fishing boat on Lake Trasimene

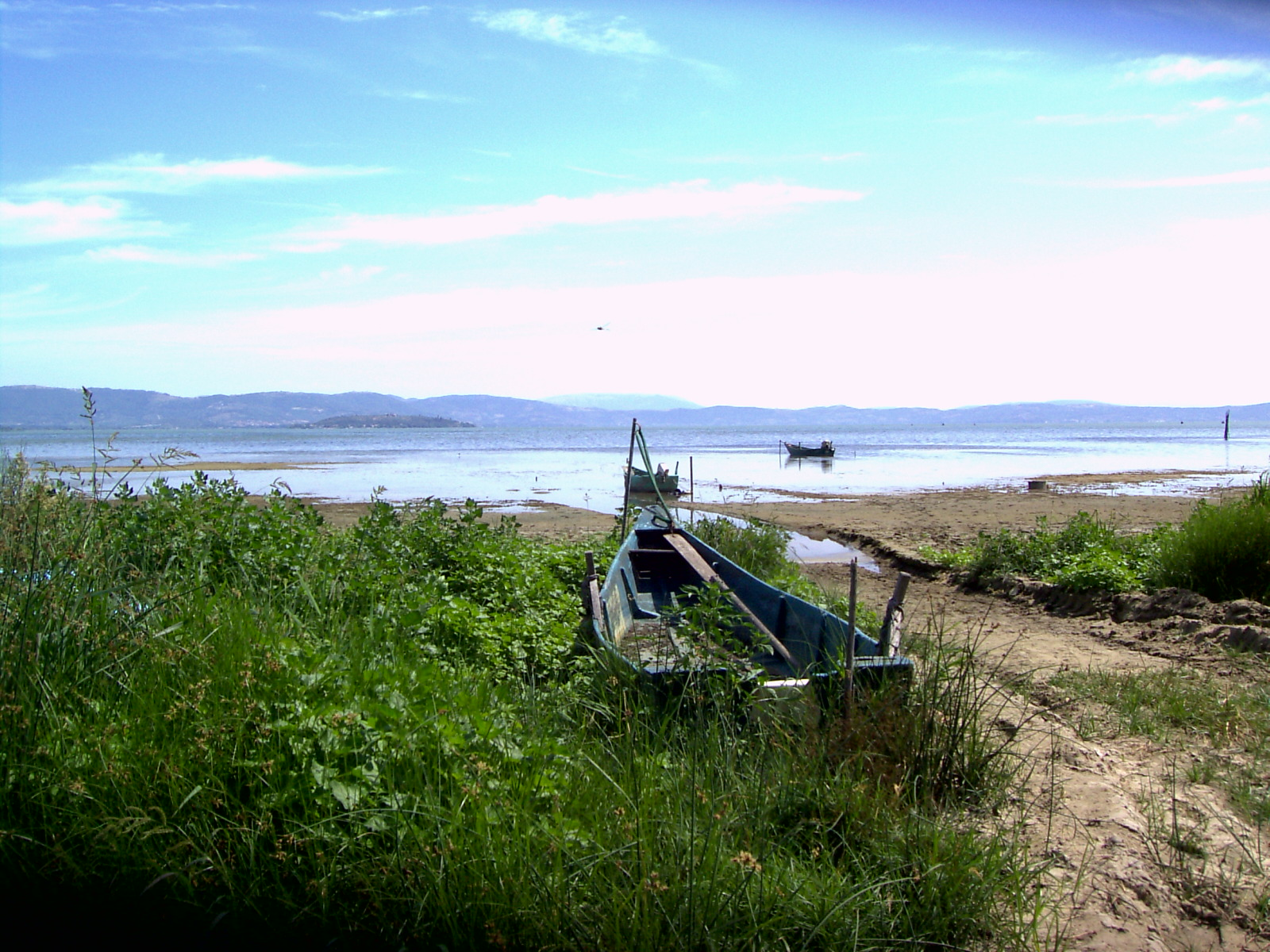
July 2008. The same boat in the same position shows how Trasimene was suffering by water's scarcity. Since 2011, the situation has improved.

After World War II, the lake's shores retreated a kilometre in the west (the eastern shore is deeper and more steeply sloped). In 1958 the water of the lake reached the lowest recorded level, at -2.63m vs reference level. Since 1958 the level increased again to reach reference level in June 1989. After the water level started again to fall, and in 2003 the shore retreated over 100 metres (328 ft) and the level fell in October 2003 to -1.85m vs reference. From 2004 to the summer of 2006, there was plenty of rain. 150 mm (6 in) of rain fell during the last 20 days of August 2005 and over 700 mm (28 in) during the remaining part of the year. During the following five years rain was insufficient (especially in 2006 and 2007 winters were very dry and summers hot) so by October 2012 the water level was -1.51 m vs the reference. Fortunately, since 2012 the winters have been very rainy so the level of the lake has progressively increased to reach in February 2014 the reference level. In April 2014 the water level increased further to reach 0.30 m above the reference.

A channel from the reservoir at Montedoglio in Tuscany to supply agriculture and lakeside towns (and thereby eliminate the need to draw water from the lake) was opened in 2012.

=== Conservation ===
The inhabitants of the communes around Trasimene and the Umbrian people have successfully protected their lake, whose waters are fit for swimming and whose valleys and islands are intact environments. In 1995 a natural park was established over the entire surface and the shores. A 50 km (31 mi) bicycle path was opened in 2003 around the lake that allows tourists to explore it. There are also cross-country paths, especially over the hills on the eastern side.

The lake is inhabited by 19 species of fish, of which 15 are introduced exotics. The impact of non-native species in the lake has been heightened by the effects of climate change, which consist primarily of decreasing water levels due to lowered precipitation and increased evaporation rates, alongside reduced transparency, less dissolved oxygen and higher salinization caused by the gradual warming and shrinking of the lake. As the exotic species mostly have wider habitat preferences than the native species, the changing environmental conditions have allowed them to further establish themselves as the native fishes decline. Decline of native species is also affected by the reduction in the lake's native vegetation, such as macrophytes and the reed Phragmites australis.

Commercially important native species include southern pike, tench, and European eel. The southern pike has been declining as a result of reduction in the lake's aquatic vegetation, as pikes use water plants for cover during hunting and as a substrate for laying their eggs. The increased water turbidity is also harmful to their hunting, as pikes are primarily visual predators. Efforts to counteract the southern pike's decline include a ban on its fishing, which has been in effect since 2011, and controlled restocking of juvenile specimens. Eels are also considered to be locally at risk due the presence of artificial dams and weirs impeding their ability to migrate between the lake and the Mediterranean Sea; restocking programs have been implemented in response to this.

The rovella and the spined loach have historically been native to the lake, but have not been recorded in modern samplings and are considered to be locally extinct. The extinction of the rovella is linked to the introduction of non-native pumpkinseed, which competed with it for food and habitat, and to decreasing rates in dissolve oxygen in the water.

Goldfish were introduced to the lake in 1988 and today make up the most common species in its fish community. Their presence has caused significant disruptions to the lake ecosystem, as their feeding on the lake bottom destroys hydrophyte coverage and stirs up sediment into the water column, increasing turbidity and causing phytoplankton blooms. They are also known to negatively impact tench populations due to competing with them for food and habitat. Other introduced species include the largemouth bass, European perch, big-scale sand smelt, topmouth gudgeon and common carp. The growing populations of goldfish, carp and gudgeon are linked to their greater tolerance for more turbid, higher-temperature water with less dissolved oxygen. Pumpkinseed has been introduced to the lake and was recorded in large numbers in 1966, but is considered to be a locally rare species in the present.

== Surroundings ==
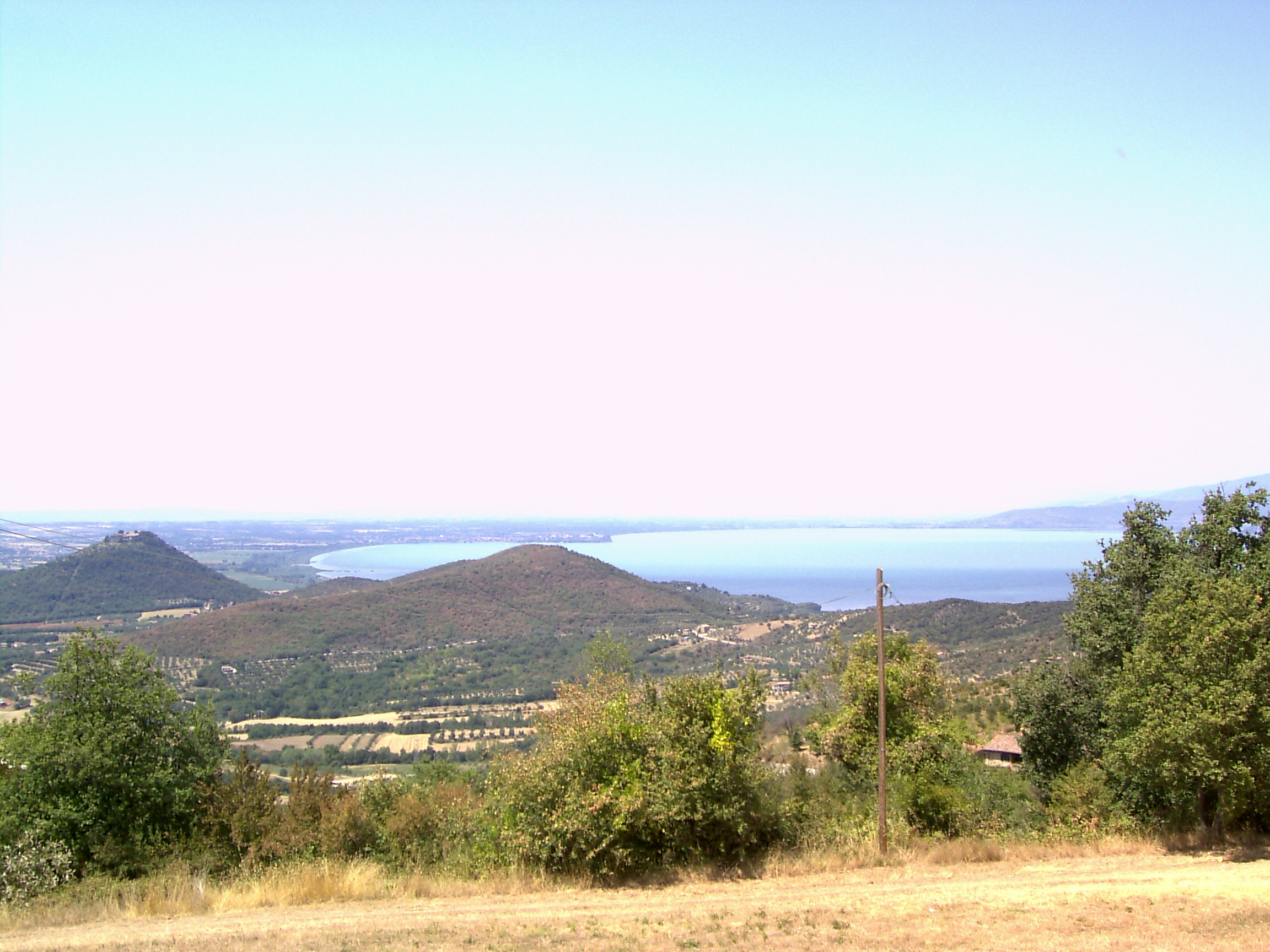
The lake seen by southern mountains, Cortona on the right

Half of Trasimene is surrounded by hills, rich in olives that are an important agricultural resource. On the western shore, near Tuscany, there are vineyards, and fruit and vegetables are grown. The hills are much lower and the climate is warmer. Monte Subasio near Assisi, about 70 km (43 mi) to the east, and Monte Amiata, about 70 km (43 mi) to the west, can be seen. The vegetation includes pines, willows and poplars around the shores, many over 30 m tall.

The main towns are Passignano sul Trasimeno, Tuoro, Monte del Lago, Torricella, San Feliciano, San Arcangelo, Castiglione del Lago, and Borghetto. Castiglione del Lago has the longest shore, being on the only significant peninsula of the lake. This may have been an island that was joined to the shore by the Romans.

Surrounding the lake are old small towns, and isolated castles, like Zocco castle and a tower near Passignano. Monte del Lago was originally built to control the road from Trasimene to Perugia.

=== Aviation ===
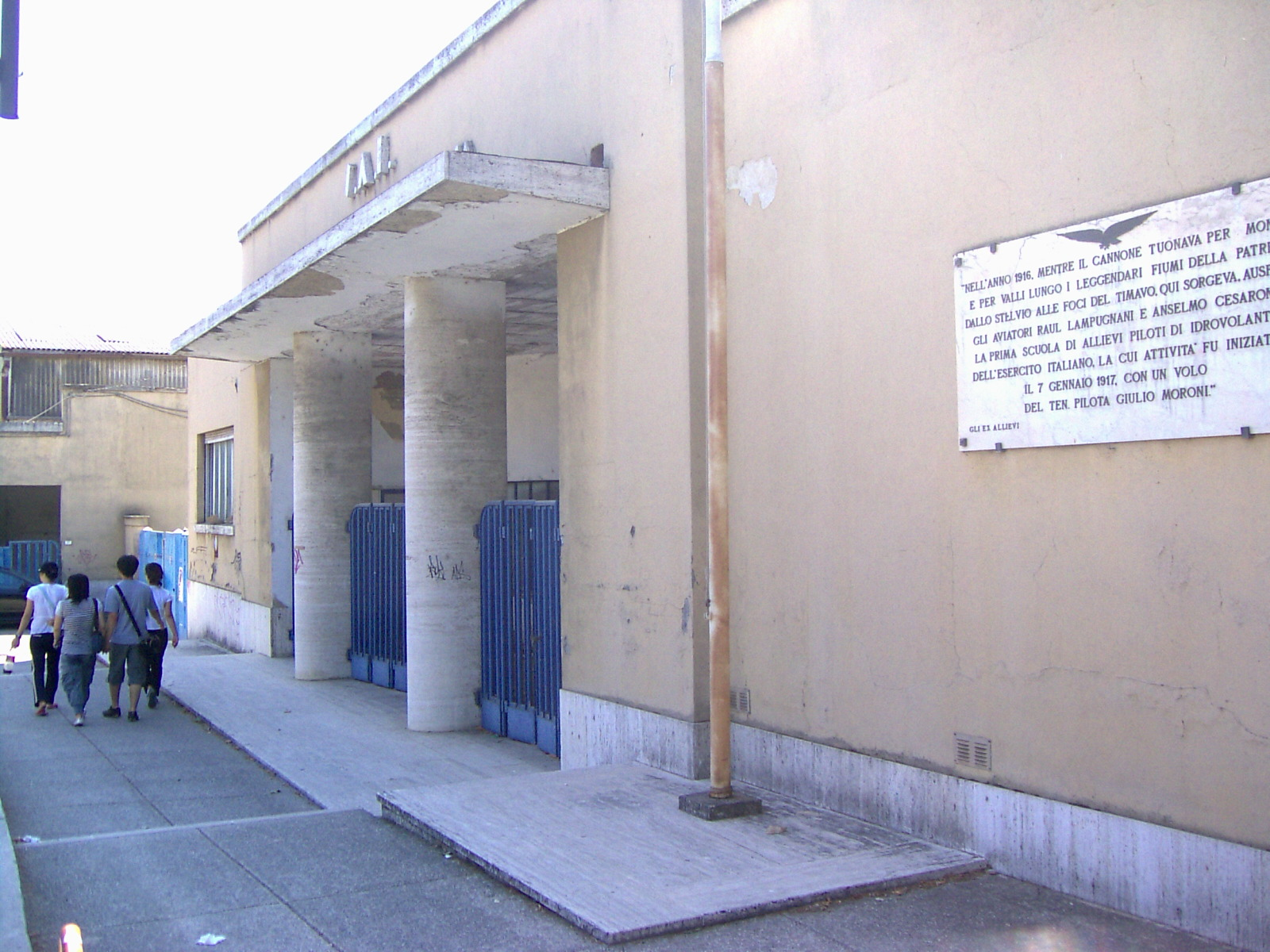
The buildings are now used as social centers.

The local airport, the Eleuteri, near Castiglione del Lago, was once one of the main aviation schools in Italy, with elegant buildings that were destroyed by retreating German troops in the summer of 1944. This airport was once almost as big as Castiglione. The mild climate and perfect visibility still allow the use of this airport for air meetings.

A social center exists in the former airport. A major watercourse, the Paganico torrent, separated the airport from the town.

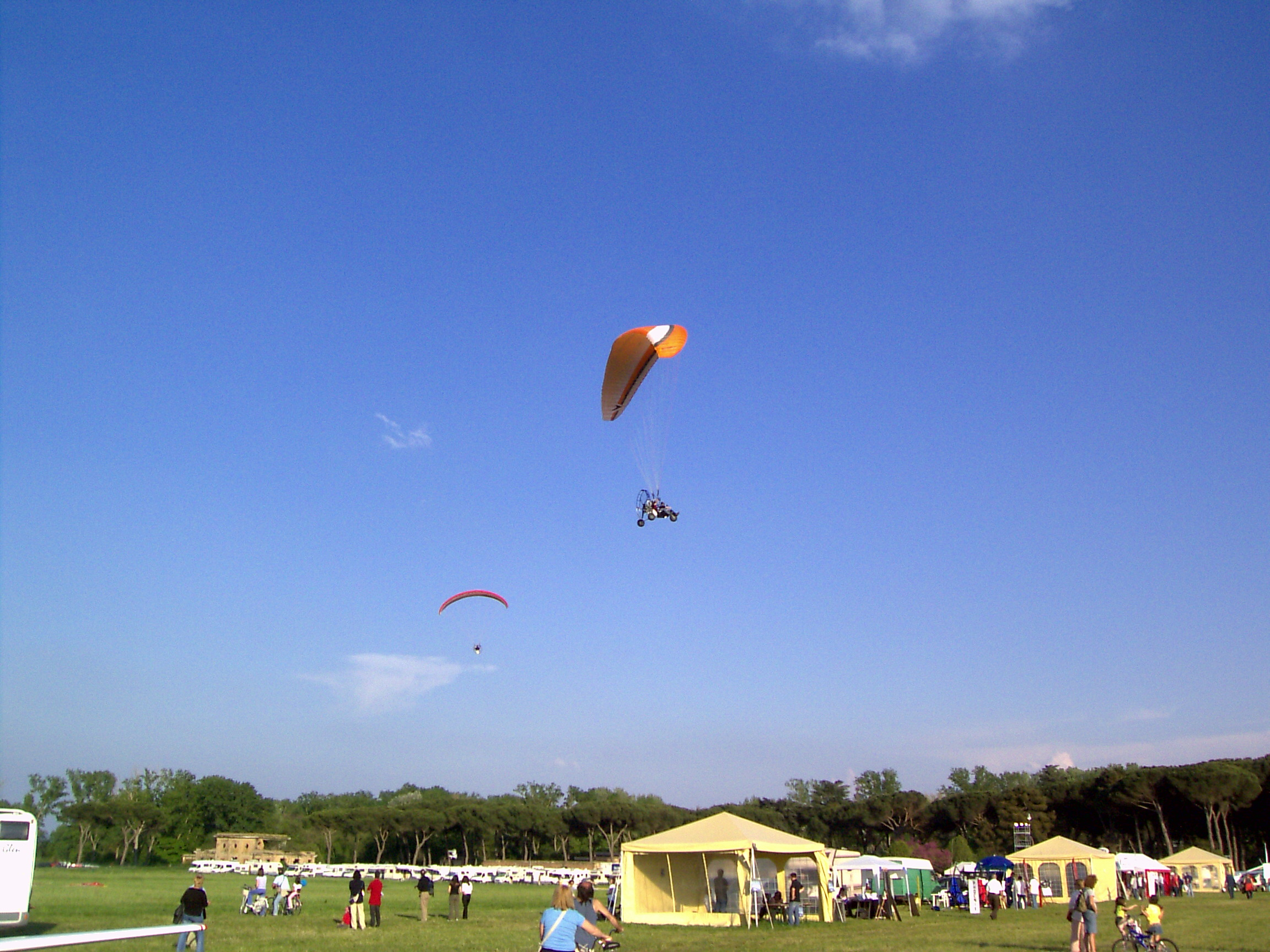
More than 200 aircraft come to the airshow, all light machines, because the strip is grass-covered

Before this airport was constructed, there was a hydroscale in Castiglione del Lago. On the opposite shore, in Passignano, around 10 km (6 mi) away, there was an aircraft factory, the SAI Ambrosini. This is now abandoned as an industrial center, but is still used as an association center. It was founded around 80 years ago and the buildings still exist near the Passignano sul Trasimeno railway station. This company made several types of aircraft, designed by eng. Sergio Stefanutti. Aircraft were tested at Eleuteri airport, only few kilometers away from this factory. SAI was involved mainly with Macchi during World War II. Eleuteri was also used as test center for the Ambrosini SS.4, advanced canard aircraft, which crashed in the second flight and the project was abandoned.

=== Communications ===
Trasimene is relatively far from every major Italian city, the nearest of which is Perugia. The Foligno–Terontola railway was completed in 1866, with the main rail station in Terontola, which has been at the junction with the Florence–Rome railway since 1875. Smaller railway stations are in Passignano and Castiglione del Lago.

Because of increased traffic, about 30 years ago a highway was built over the Passignano's road to Perugia. This highway passes near the north and the east shores of Trasimene and goes to Perugia and Assisi. Many smaller roads, such as state highway 75, are also present, especially on the western side of the lake. The Autostrada A1 passes five kilometers (3.1 mi) to the west of the Lake.

=== Navigation ===
Strict regulations apply for the navigation on the Lake. A protected strip is established for the entire perimeter of Lake Trasimene for a distance of 150 meters from the shore of the lake and the shore of the islands. In the protected strip navigation is only permitted for craft having a maximum length of 9 meters at the waterline, propelled by oars or by sail, at a maximum speed of two knots. Exceptions apply to authorised boats propelled by motor only in the water in front of port areas or authorized landing places. There are ferryboats, 3 small, 2 medium, and two big (two decks) called Perusia and Agilla II, based in Passignano Port, also two dredges. There are ports in Castiglione del Lago (recently totally rebuilt), S. Arcangelo, S. Feliciano, Tuoro, and several minor anchorages.

== Islands ==
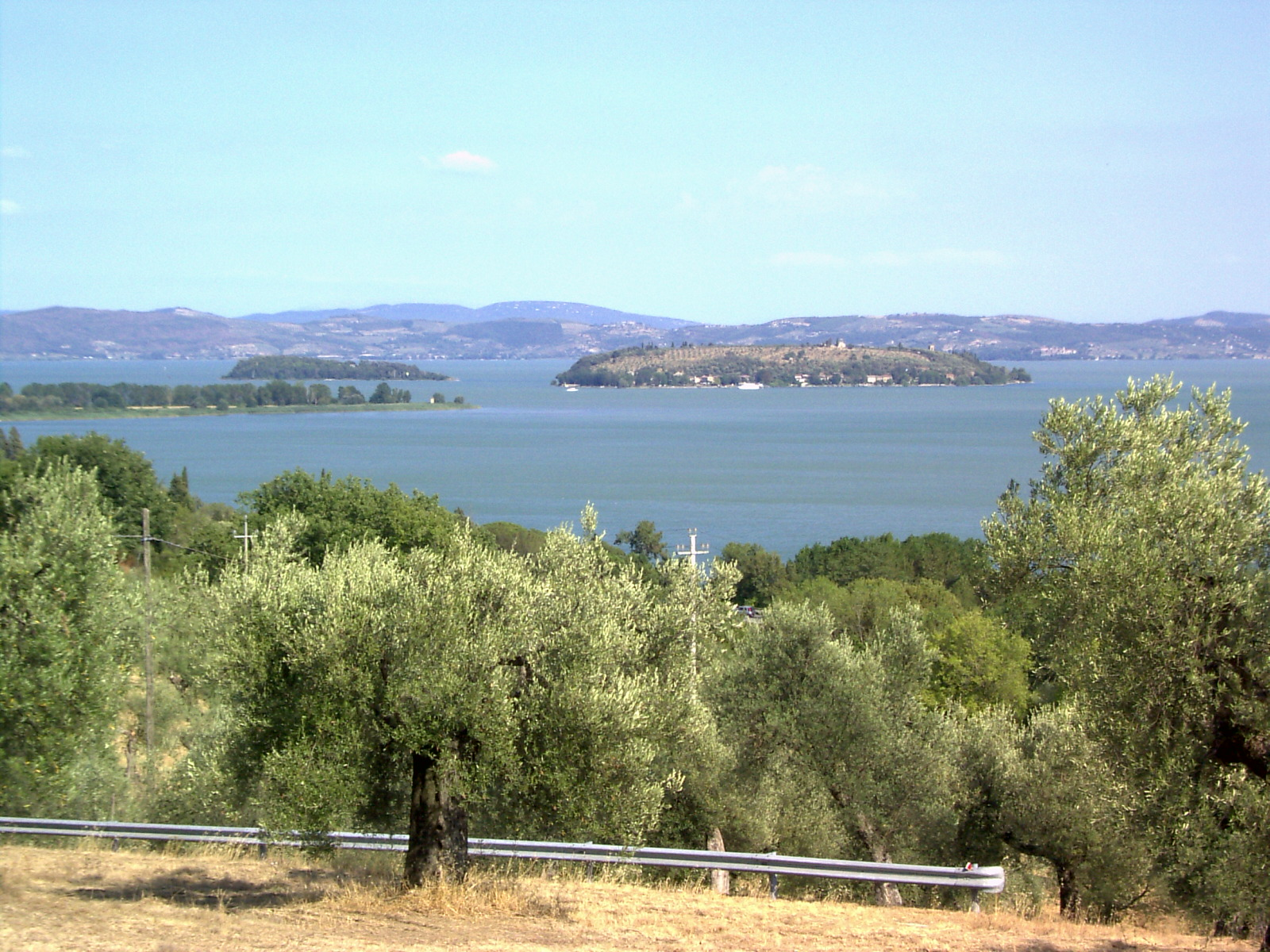
The Isola Maggiore, Isola Minore and the Perusia ferryboat, seen near a hill planted with olives

There are three islands in the lake. The largest of these is the Isola Polvese, almost 1 square kilometres in area. The second largest, the Isola Maggiore, is the only one to be inhabited. Its small fishing village, which reached its high point in the 14th century, today has only around thirty residents. Most of the buildings, including the ruins of a Franciscan friary, date from the 14th century.

The Isola Maggiore is basically a hill, whereas the Isola Polvese is geographically more complex with both hills and low-lying ground, and the Isola Minore resembles a sloped table. The latter is now uninhabited, but in the past it had a village with over 500 residents. Many centuries ago, a castle with a pentagonal structure was erected near the shore, near an Olivetan monastery. The castle is still there, and the ruins of the church and the monastery are largely preserved, despite being abandoned in the 17th century due to malaria, which was eradicated locally only in the 1950s. In earlier centuries there were other problems, since Trasimeno was fought over by Chiusi, Panicale, Perugia, and Florence.

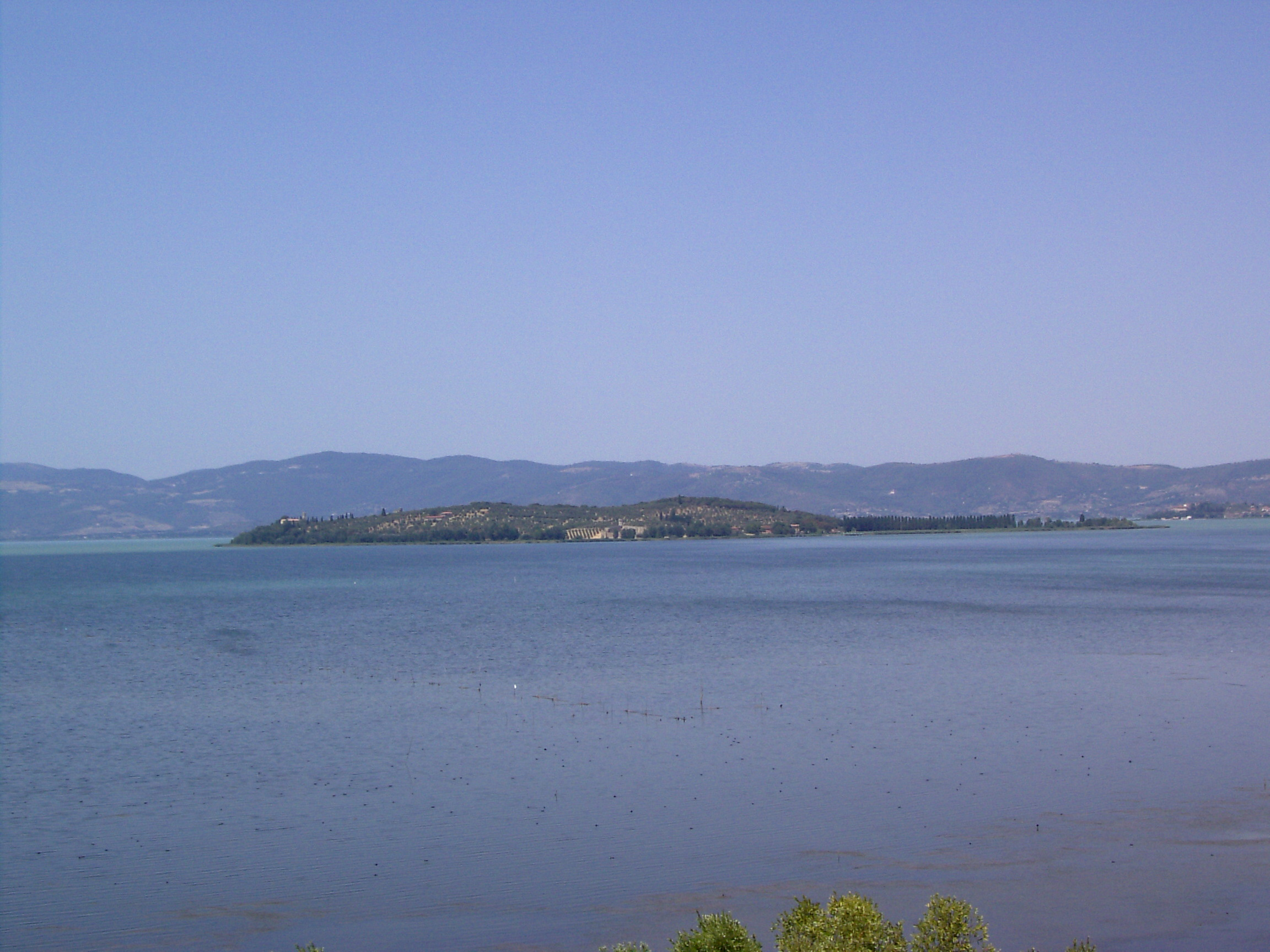
The Isola Polvese seen by C.Lago

Florentine troops demolished buildings on the Isola Polvese in the 17th century, starting its decline, until by the 19th century there was only a caretaker. Of the many houses that once existed, nothing remains.

The Isola Minore, lying near the Isola Maggiore, is now uninhabited, and completely covered by vegetation except for a small anchorage. In ancient times, there was a certain split between two local communities at the lake, since the Isola Polvese was distant from the other two islands. According to local stories, the two communities fought one another but the real problems were caused by the dominant regional states that fought over this lake for centuries.

A fishing technique, called 'tuoro' or 'pesca da tuori', was used locally. This complex system consisted of a wooden trap in the water and a circular structure to hold the net around it. The fish trapped in this way were then taken to the village to be dried. This system worked with a high water level, but was abandoned when the level dropped. A mock up of this system was built several years ago near the anchorage on the Isola Polvese.

== Castles ==
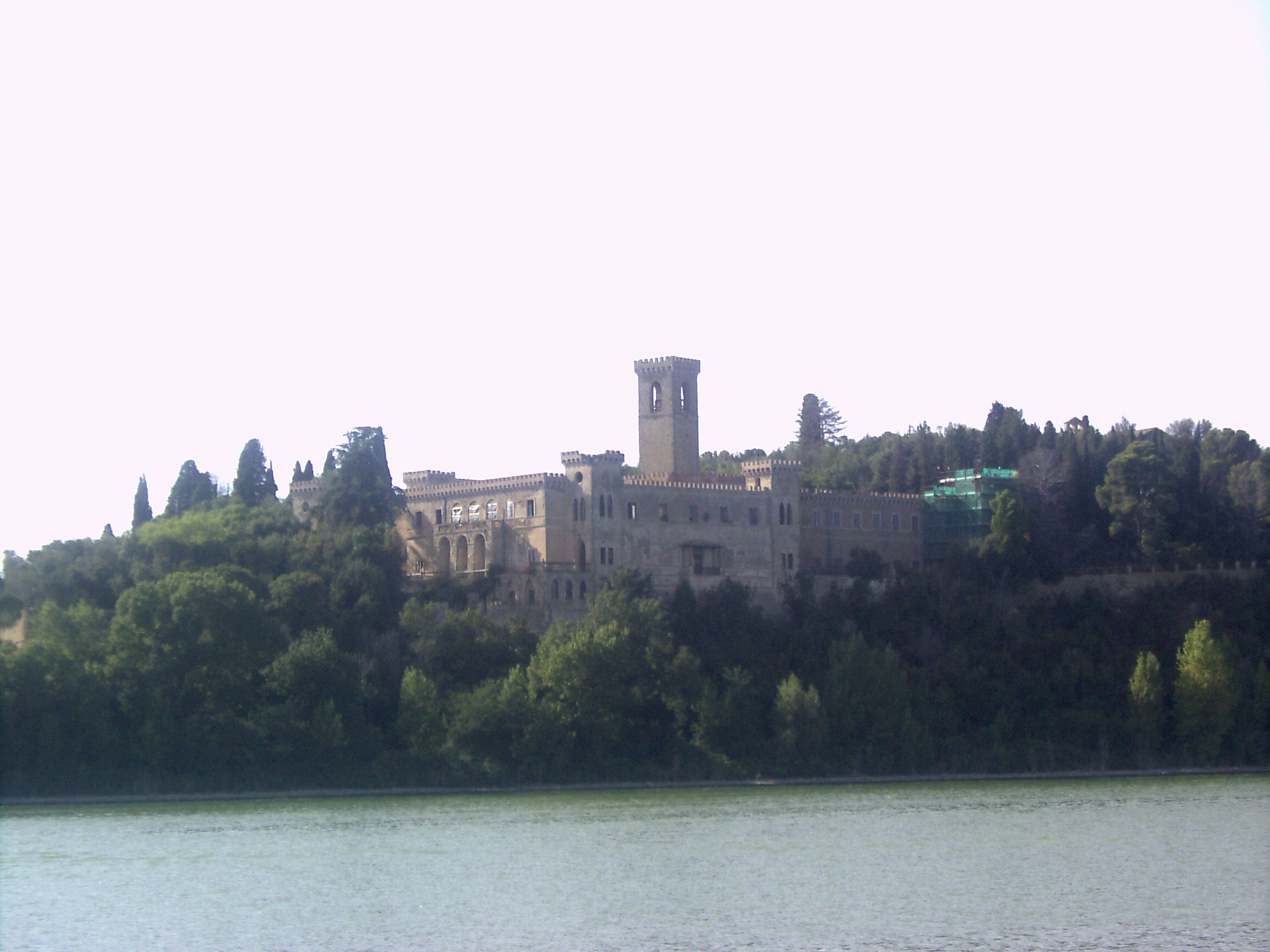
Maggiore Castle, partially in ruins

There are several castles all around the Trasimene Lake, located in the Umbria region (central Italy). Many castles are located in the center of small towns and in the hills overlooking the lake. Both of the beautiful main islands of the lake, as Isola Maggiore and Isola Polvese, are characterized by a castle. Castles are also present in Castiglione del Lago, Passignano sul Trasimeno, Magione where is the majestic castle of the knights of Malta. Other castles, such as Zocco castle, Montali castle, and others are on hilltops and sometimes in ruins.

The Guglielmi castle on the Isola Maggiore was built in the late 19th century on the foundation of an old Franciscan convent, including church and bell tower. Until 1998 it was still visitable, then it was closed because the structure became dangerously unstable. It is now being restored by a new owner, but the restoration work has not yet been completed.

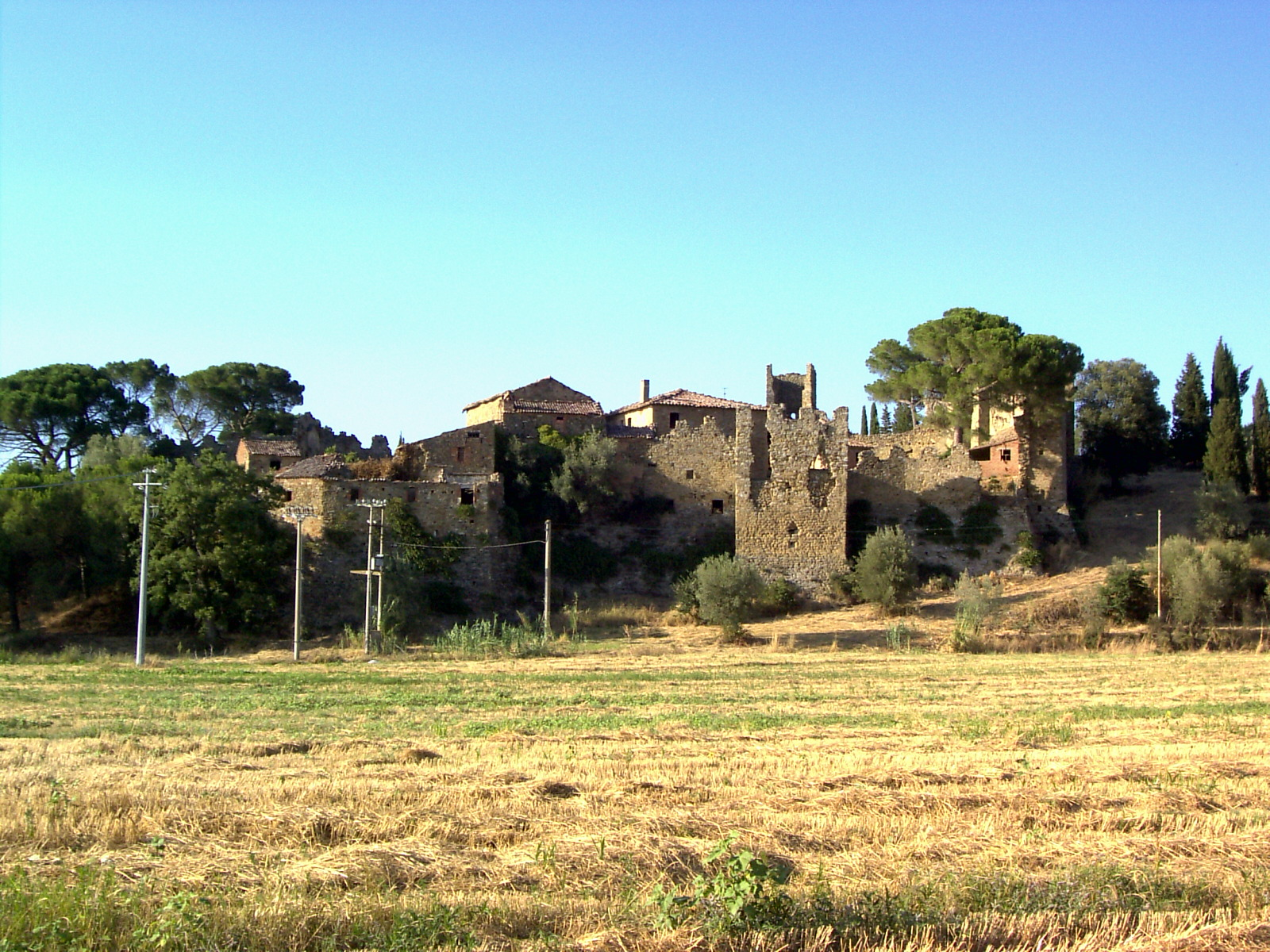
The ruins of Zocco castle

Between Monte del Lago and S.Feliciano is Zocco castle, ruined for decades. It is privately owned but unmaintained. It is one of the biggest castles of the area and the only one that, inside its sandstone walls, has a still untouched medieval keep. Some years ago it was probably inhabited, as there is a building fitted with a TV antenna, but now its only entry is closed. The best-preserved parts are the eastern and the southern walls, increasingly endangered because the wall's faults are enlarging. The rest of the walls are mostly demolished or have fallen down. One of the southern towers has two enormous cracks in the middle.

The Vernazzano leaning tower (N43 13.210 E12 06.084), around 20 metres (66 ft) in height, leans like the famous Leaning Tower of Pisa. This unique remnant of an ancient castle was built before 1089, when the Marchiones family donated the whole castle to the monastery of Città di Castello. In 1202, it fell under control of Perugia and this city gained control of Northern Trasimene. It was built on M.te Castiglione, near two rivers. The castle and the surrounding settlement at Vernazzano, were damaged by wars in 15th century and two centuries later, by a strong earthquake and after-shocks. Erosion of the foundations by water caused the tower to lean in the 18th century. Vernazzano was rebuilt in the valley, away from this site, which had been effective for territorial control but was less well-suited for living in. The Leaning Tower has therefore been abandoned for almost 300 years. To avoid its collapse, a steel reinforcement was recently added, with plates and wires as thick as 2 to 3 cm (0.8 to 1.2 in). The Tower is not well known, being located away from the main streets. It is visible from far away, but not easily accessible.

== In literature ==
Lydia Sigourney reflects on the lake, presently peaceable but with a history of violent warfare, in her poem Lake Thrasymene., published in 1827.

== Image gallery ==
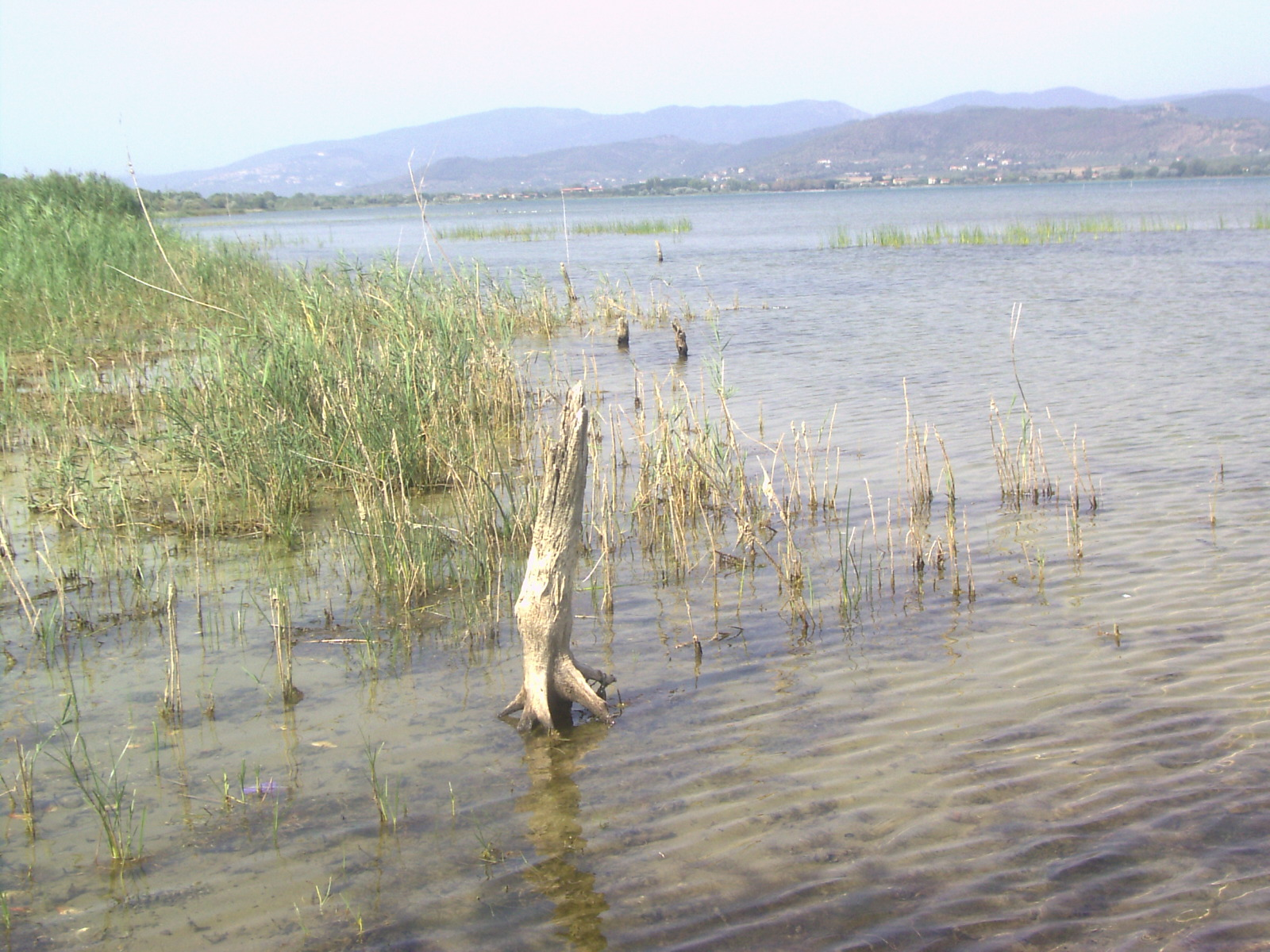
Tree remains on Trasimene's shores. They were planted when the lake's level was much lower and died when it rose.

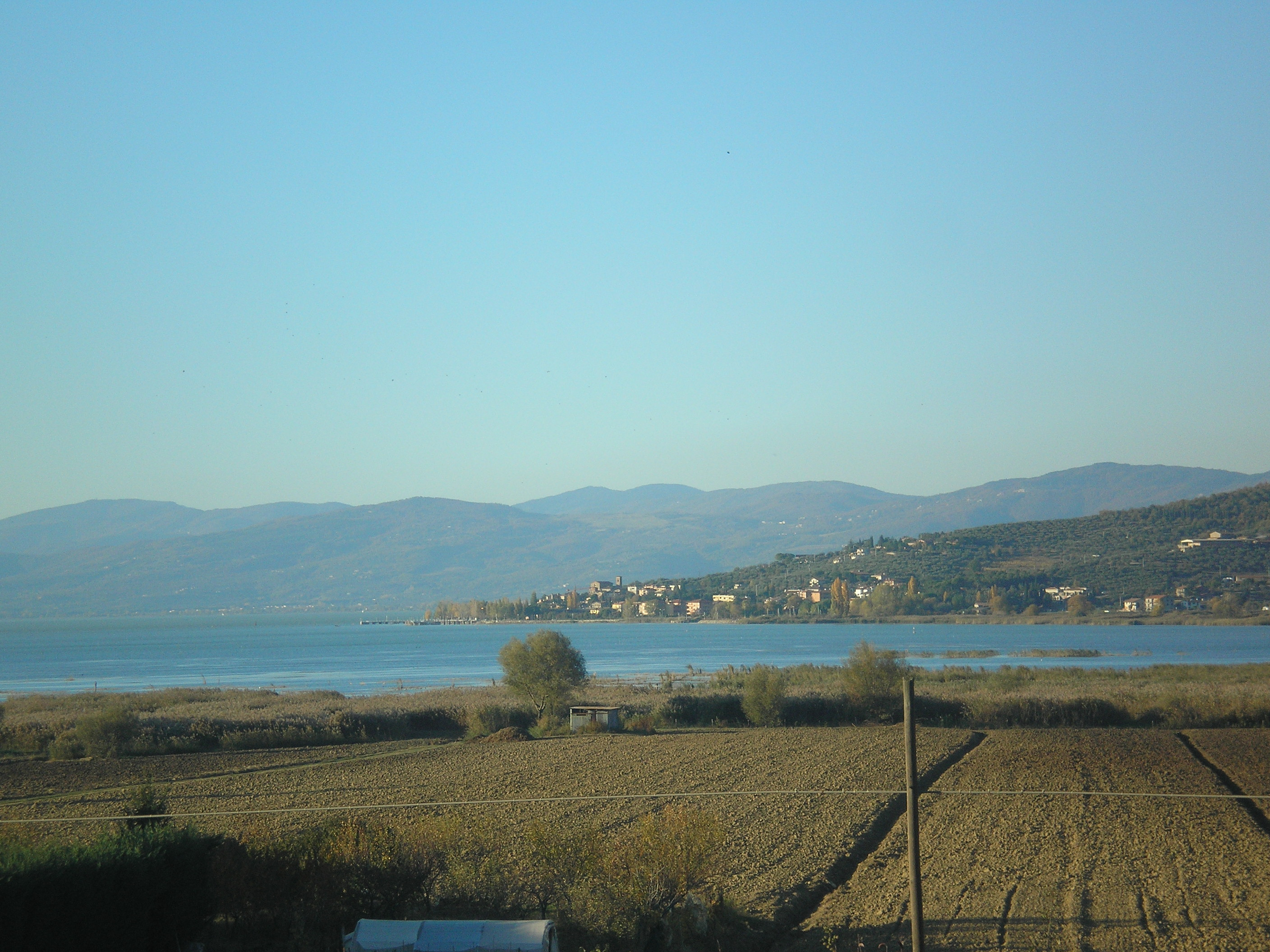
The lake seen from Montebuono di Magione

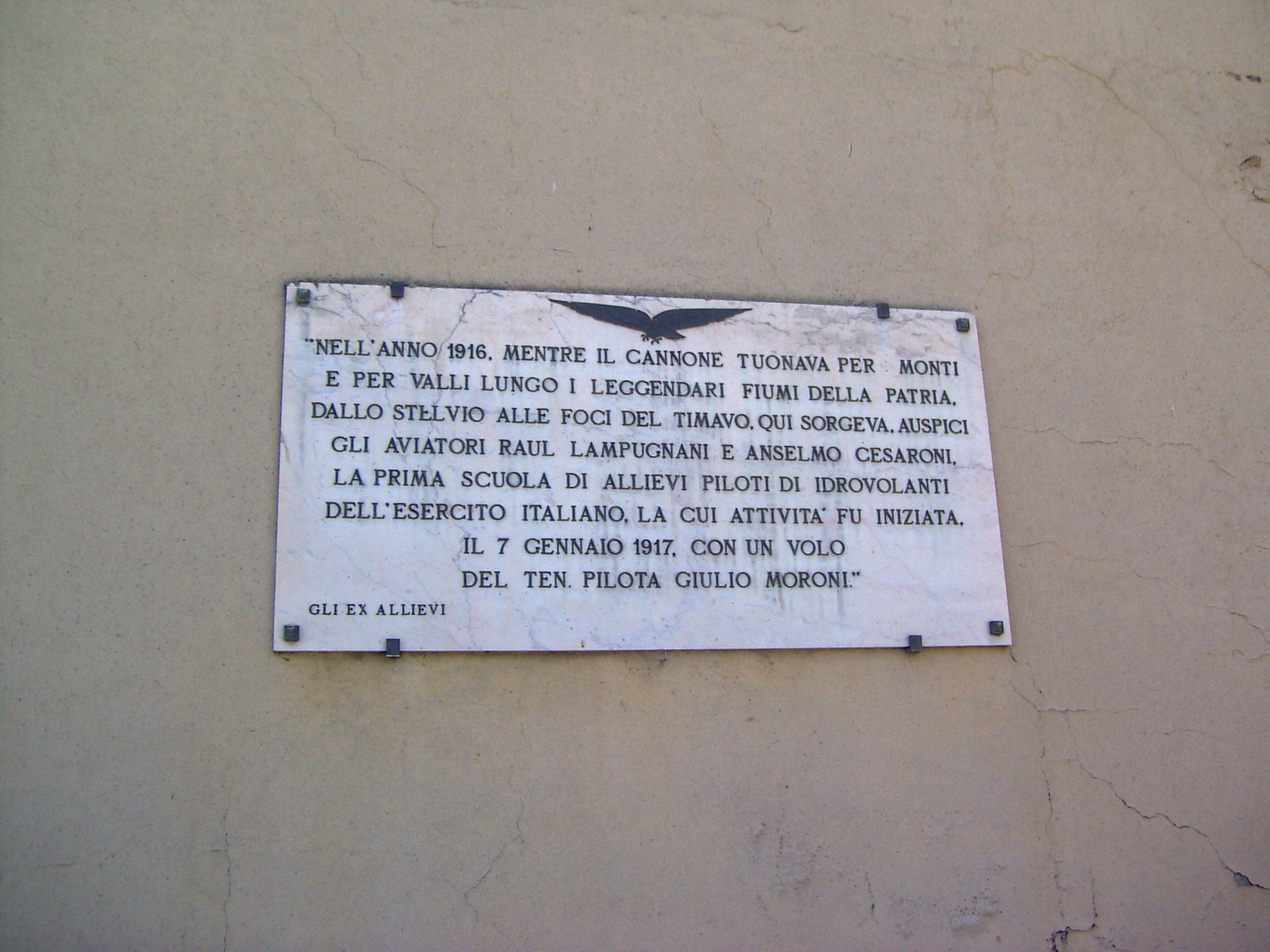
How SAI born in 1916 is explained there, in the front of the factory

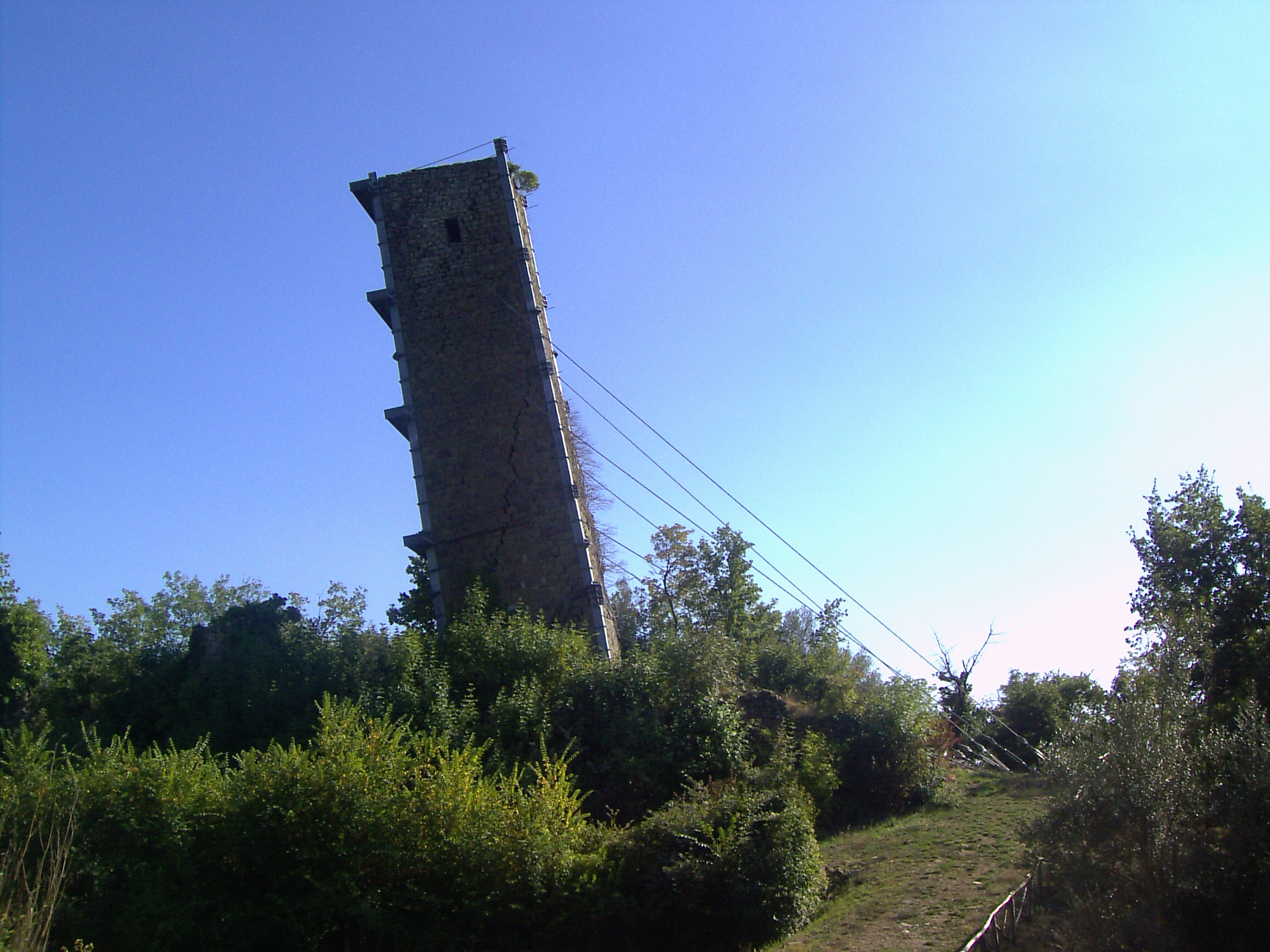
The Leaning Tower. Note the number of steel cables recently added to preserve it.

== See also ==
- Battle of Lake Trasimene (in the Second Punic War)
- Trasimene Line, battle in World War II
- Trasimène, département of the First French Empire
- Umbria
