= San Feliciano =

Coordinates: 43.117°N 12.168°E

San Feliciano is a village in the municipality of Magione in the Province of Perugia, Umbria in Italy. From San Feliciano a ferry leaves for the Isola Polvese.

It is a fishing village and centre for tourism in the Commune of Magione. Among its attractions is the Museo della Pesca, a joint venture between local authorities and fishermen's cooperatives.

The village lies 4 km south west of Magione and 18 km west of Perugia at the Lake Trasimeno. San Feliciano has around 580 inhabitants,

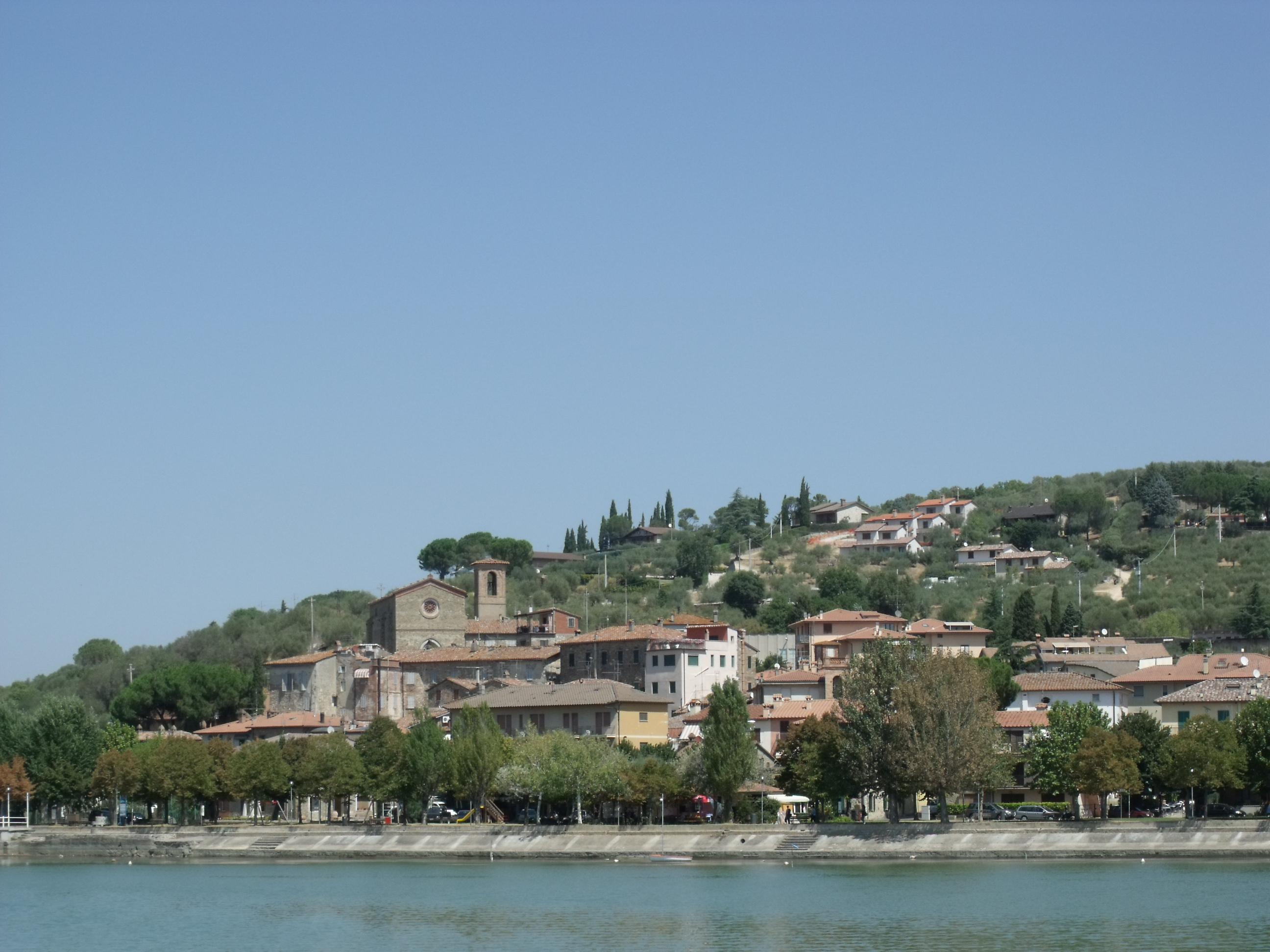
Panorama of San Feliciano
